= 8th Vermont Infantry Regiment =

- Active: February 18, 1862, to June 28, 1865
- Country: United States
- Allegiance: Union
- Branch: Infantry
- Engagements: Port Hudson; Opequon; Fisher's Hill; Cedar Creek

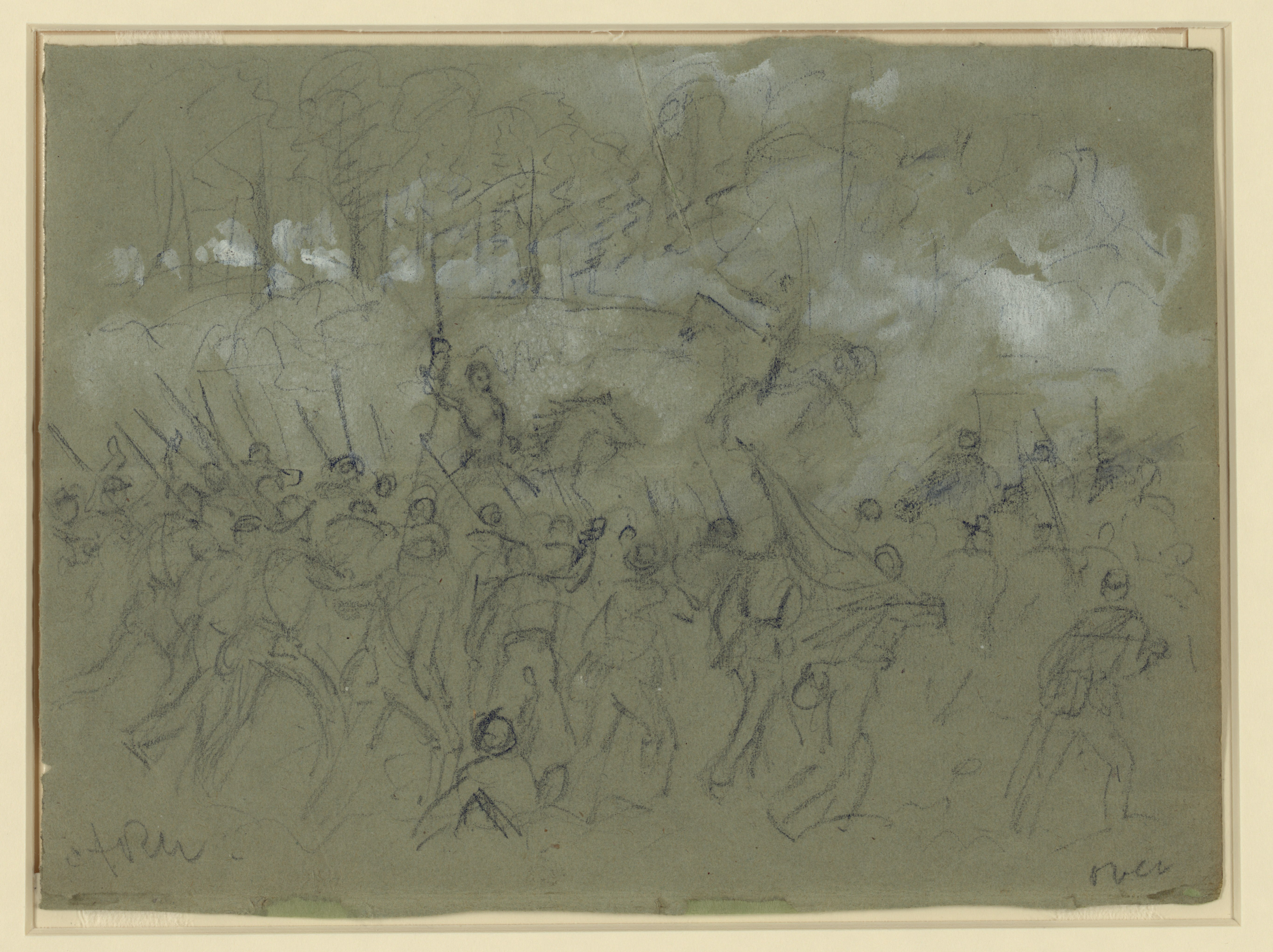
The charge of the 8th Vermont at the Third Battle of Winchester by Alfred Waud, September 19, 1864

The 8th Vermont Infantry Regiment was a three-year infantry regiment in the Union Army during the American Civil War. It served in both major theaters, first in Louisiana and then in Virginia, from February 1862 to June 1865. It was a member of the XIX Corps.

The regiment was mustered into Federal service on February 18, 1862, at Brattleboro, Vermont. It was engaged in, or present at, the Occupation of New Orleans, Raceland, Boutte Station, Bayou des Allemands, the Steamer "Cotton," Bisland, and Port Hudson, in the Department of the Gulf, and Opequon, Fisher's Hill, Cedar Creek, and Newtown in the Shenandoah Valley campaign.

== Service ==
=== Organization/training ===
The 8th Vermont was designed from the outset for Maj. Gen. Butler's southern expedition. Butler had visited Montpelier and solicited the General Assembly to raise troops for his expedition. Gaining approval from the state, Butler recruited another War Democrat from the legislature, Stephen Thomas, to be the Colonel of the 8th and recruit it. (Note: The 51-year-old Thomas was born in Bethel, and his father was killed in action during the War of 1812. His grandfather had served in a New Hampshire regiment in the Revolution. Thomas had been a wool mill owner before entering politics, becoming successively sheriff, judge of probate, a six time member of the Vermont House of Representatives, and two-time member of the Vermont Senate. He was also a veteran of the Vermont Militia, and commanded a company of the 19th Regiment as a captain in the 1830s and 1840s. Thomas had also twice been the Democratic nominee for Lieutenant Governor.)

Unlike the 7th Vermont (which also was sent to Butler), the regiment's officers and men knew that they were bound for the Gulf of Mexico. (Note: It was the only Vermont regiment which retained its first colonel throughout its initial three years' term despite Thomas' age.) The 8th was raised by the state legislature's authority, and were recruited, armed, and equipped by Col. Thomas, under direct instructions from federal government through Butler. Due to this genesis, the regiment had a different relationship to the state than the other volunteer units. Other volunteer regiments enlisted by the state received care and supplies from state officials, but the troops raised by Thomas could not look to Vermont for any aid, and the responsibility and labor of providing for them devolved wholly upon him and his staff. In a sense they belonged to the federal government, and not to the state where they enlisted. They were not entitled to share in the state aid provided other Vermont troops. (Note: In fact on leaving for the front, the only state property they took with them was a lot of sectional houses which the men never wanted, and did not use after leaving Camp Holbrook.) Being thus thrown on their own resources to obtain supplies as best they could, members of the 8th developed learned to become self-reliant and make do to meet and endure the hard life in store for them.

To encourage and promote rapid enlistments, Thomas and his growing staff were continually on the move among the recruiting stations from Brattleboro to Derby Line, working days, travelling nights, making addresses, contracting for supplies and transportation, paying bills, and seeing that the work was pushed forward. As his staff, Thomas chosen practical men, some of whom had previously served the state in organizing and furnishing other outgoing regiments.

The regiment bivouacked in the middle of a Vermont winter of unusual severity, amid deep snows, when the thermometer ranged from ten to fifteen degrees below zero. Their only shelter was a lot of cheap sectional wooden houses that the men found less convenient and comfortable than tents would have been. Under such conditions, the men set about learning to be soldiers and drilled daily. Through the experience, they adopted to field life.

The training camp was a field of high elevation just a short distance southwest of Brattleboro. Named after Governor Holbrook, it had ample room quarters and drill ground. (Note: Its location proved to be so well adapted as a place of temporary rendezvous for the state troops, that it was retained and used for that purpose until the close of the war.)

The winter of 1861-62 was one of unusual severity. The temperatures were extremely cold, and snow fell very early and accumulated as each new storm dumped more. Increasing discomfort, the portable wooden buildings used for quarters were not insulated for such a winter. Large wood stoves in the center heated them with bunk beds along the walls forcing the men to huddle together and burn a large supply of fuel to keep warm during the day, but at night, they found to keep those in the lower berths warm nearly suffocated their comrades in the upper bunks. Scores fell sick with severe colds, and the surgeons not only had a little foretaste of army practice, but soon had a hospital full of patients. Chills and fevers attacked many, and soon after measles and mumps broke out in the camp.

The regiment continued with its training, learning to obey with promptness and precision the necessary commands. When issued uniforms from federal stock, the men found contractors made them in only a small number of sizes and the seams of these uniforms failed so much that in the course of the first week, many of the men reinforced them with sewing gear provided by their families. While possibly not warm enough for midwinter Vermont, they would resist the milder air in the Gulf.

The ten companies of the 8th were sworn into the U. S. service for three years, Feb. 18, 1862. (Note: A further two companies were recruited that became the 1st and 2nd Batteries of the Vermont Light Artillery.) Again, due to its origin, the regiment's departure was delayed by a deficiency of medical stores, until Thomas and the medical staff succeeded in obtaining a limited supply. The regiment remained in camp at Brattleboro until March 4, when it left for New York.

=== Transit ===
On March 4, 1862, the 1,060 men of the 8th and the 160 of the 1st Battery boarded a train at Brattleboro station heading south along the " winding and willow-fringed" Connecticut River which still had ice on its banks. All along the railway, they were cheered by signals of encouragement and miniature flags. In Northampton, they saw a rebel flag captured by one of the Massachusetts regiments in North Carolina had captured and sent home. On reaching Springfield, the 8th received refreshments from the ladies of the city and were cheered by a crowd on departure. At twilight, the train reached the wharf at New Haven, where the regiment boarded the steamer Granite State which brought them to New York City the next morning.

The regiment landed and marched to City Hall barracks for rations and that afternoon the regiment embarked on the sailing ships James Hovey and Wallace. On Sunday afternoon, March 9, the Hovey (with the colonel, major, quartermaster, assistant surgeon and six companies) and Wallace (with the lieutenant-colonel, adjutant, surgeon, the other four companies, and the battery) set sail. After a heavy gale separated the vessels once out of sight of land, sealed orders were opened and, as had been expected, their destination was Ship Island. A long and stormy voyage ensued, and after a twenty-seven-day transit, the ships arrived a few hours apart at Ship Island on Sunday, April 6.

=== Department of the Gulf ===
Assigned to the command of Brig. General John W. Phelps, the men had hardly pitched their tents when a severe storm hit the island. With their camp overflowed by sea, the men moved with their baggage to higher ground. The gale eventually passed, and daily drills resumed.

On Friday, April 18, the regiment heard Porter's bombardment of the forts below New Orleans sixty miles to the southwest, and soon heard of the occupation of the city. Butler sent for the 8th which struck camp on Thursday, May 6. It embarked before Friday dawn on the Hovey, and sailed for the mouth of the Mississippi leaving a number of sick men and two comrades who died of disease.

Arriving Saturday night, Hovey rode anchor at Southwest Pass for two days until a steamer came to tow her up to New Orleans. The men noted the sights as the ship rode high above the rice plantations including the wrecks of the Confederate gunboats, Forts Jackson and St. Philip on either side now flying the stars and stripes, and the throngs of blacks along the banks welcoming the regiment. As the ship slowly passed under the walls of the forts, the men, while aware that a stubborn battle had been fought there, did not then realize the magnitude of Farragut's naval achievement. The regiment gave the new federal garrisons a rousing salute which was answered forts' men.

==== New Orleans ====
===== Initial duty =====
Arriving a little before sunset, Monday, May 12, the 8th first saw New Orleans, still covered with smoke from its burned warehouses and smoldering docks. The men noted the hostility of the multitudes of unemployed men and how the richer and influential citizens encouraged it, particularly the women. The regiment saw the Confederacy's largest city's strange streets crowded with people, going around in aimless confusion. Above the general tumult, as the troops entered the streets, could be heard the loud strains of "Bonny Blue Flag," and other secession songs.

The regiment debarked from the Hovey on Monday evening and after the regiment formed in the street, orders were given to load the muskets in readiness for any emergency that might arise. Marching to "Yankee Doodle", which drowned the secession songs of the taunting mobs, the men moved to temporary quarters at the Union Cotton Press, and a strong guard was detailed for the neighborhood, and both officers and men slept on their arms. To further insure their safety, Col. Thomas issued very strict orders against leaving the quarters for any purpose. That first night in the city was memorable for the men. The colonel was vigilant, the men quiet and determined, the sentinels alert, and every precaution taken against surprise attack by an armed force or a city mob. The enforcement of strict military discipline was deadly serious. No one could be trusted, and the Vermont soldiers were liable at any moment to have to fight for their lives. The men knew they were in a hostile city and little temptation to leave quarters. The men got little sleep the first night, and, though no disturbance was attempted, they were relieved to see daylight on Tuesday morning.

At the end of the week, Saturday, May 17, the 8th moved into permanent quarters in the Mechanics Institute (Note: In 1866, this building would be the scene of a notoriously deadly race riot.) and the adjoining Medical College of Louisiana. With airy, convenient quarter and ample rations, the men made themselves thoroughly comfortable. Beginning at once, their main duties became police and provost guard duty and the distribution of food to the starving citizens. As the men in the 8th began to appear in public, and travel about on their duties, the bitter hatred of the local white seccessionists manifested in numerous ways from disgust looks to vehement verbal attacks. Despite this defiance, the Rebel sympathizers did not attempt any acts of personal violence against the regiment's members.

The men found it took great discipline to adhere to Butler's strict orders for his soldiers as well as for the citizens. He ordered all officers to never appear on the streets alone or without their side arms, all troops must pass through the streets in silence taking no offence to insults and threats, and if any violence was attempted must simply arrest the offenders. It was an ordeal of temper and of discipline punctuated by rumors of an uprising by the locals and of Lovell's army returning to recapture the city. (Note: Lovell wrote to the Confederate War Department, that he made formal offer to the mayor and to prominent citizens, to return "and not leave as long as one brick remained upon another" if they desired. Despite their open hostility to U.S. federal authorities, they, however, "urged decidedly that it be not done,") These wise and humane restrictions were often very galling to the pride of the men and under repeated provocation, resentment sometimes got the better of prudence, and the loyal soldiers became exasperated. As a result, night after night the troops slept on their arms, in readiness for instant action. They went quietly about their appointed duty, and presently concluded that while they remained in the city, they were relatively safe.

Police and provost duty was the men's first service outside their quarters. In the organization of police districts, Major Dillingham was appointed commandant of a district, and each captain was assigned to a subdistrict, the soldiers taking the place of the city police, which Butler had disbanded.Large details were made each morning to protect public and private property, to seize concealed arms, and arrest suspicious and disorderly persons.

Butler was very active in rebuilding the city and soon realized he could use the telegraph lines in and about the city for the benefit of his military operations. These were in a disarray and the Confederates, before evacuation, had destroyed or secreted the apparatus of the telegraph offices, cut wires, and done all they could to make the lines inoperative.

Butler began to select men from the 8th for special service running the telegraph system. Needing a practical and capable telegrapher for the system superintendent, he asked his regimental commanders for such a man, and found the regiment's Quarter Master Sergeant J. Elliot Smith (Note: Smith, of Montpelier, was a brother regimental Quartermaster Fred Smith, and after the war had a career as the superintendent of the fire alarm telegraph in New York city.) fitting. On Saturday, May 17, Smith commissioned a lieutenant on Butler's staff and charged with of putting all the city's telegraph lines and of the fire alarm telegraph in order at the earliest possible moment. A young man of ability and energy, he began in earnest. Allowed a detail 40 men to assist him, Smith chose his operators and assistants largely from the 8th and taught them practical telegraphy. Soon, Smith had the lines working to all points occupied by Butler's troops.

Initially, local citizens showed their hostility by closing stores and other public places to the federal troops, but economic necessity overrode their attitude, and they soon reopened their businesses. At first, local merchants demanded coin or Confederate money. This behavior ceased when Rebel forces failed to return, and they realized that the U.S. government was not leaving. Local traders soon accepted U.S. currency. (Note: Carpenter noted an instance when the previously mentioned Quartermaster Smith ran into a boyhood friend who had moved to the city. This Vermont native's secessionist feeling was so strong that he refused to renew the friendship while Smith was wearing his uniform. .)

The men of the 8th gradually saw that the white male population's sentiments were not as spiteful as that of the women who never missed a chance to insult and abuse them. Wearing small Confederate flags conspicuously on their dresses, or waving them in their hands in public places, they would rise and leave a street car if a Union officer entered it. . To avoid meeting soldiers on the sidewalk, they would step into the street. All this hostility and evil treatment the 8th bore with patience winning Butler's approval. It finally cme to a head when a woman spat in the faces of two Federal officers who were quietly walking along the street. In response, Butler issued the famous General Order No. 28 which caused such actions to cease.

===== Across the river in Algiers =====
After a month in the city, the 8th relieved the 21st Indiana across the river in Algiers. The regiment was the only Union force on that side of the river, and Colonel Thomas had general charge of the district around Algiers, in a civil and military capacity, with his own provost judge and marshal. During the Rebels' retreat, they had destroyed the New Orleans, Opelousas and Great Western Railroad (NOO&GW) line there. The 8th, using the expertise of its members who had worked for railroads, began repairing the line. They soon got both the road and the rolling stock were put in running order. The regiment put a strong guard on board of all moving trains and served as conductors.

Soon, U.S. forces found large numbers of escaped slaves emancipating themselves by crossing into their lines. Standing War Department orders then in force, required troops to return fugitives. Many of his forces were seeing the results of slavery first-hand for the first time and felt strongly the policy was wrong. The men of the 8th were caught up in this conundrum. Many members saw slavery as evil, (Note: The majority of the 8th shared the anti-slavery feeling of Vermont people whose first Constitution, in its first article, forbade slavery.) and others were turning against it, after seeing enough of its horrors up close to make them "an Abolitionist forever," yet forced to comply by the orders. Natural sympathy won out, and the men, not finding it in their hearts to comply, ignored it. One incident changed many of the men to turn completely against the institution when a slave owner appeared and began to beat the escapee when he refused to return. Every time he hit the black man, men of the 8th kicked him; the slaveowner, finding himself likely to get badly beaten stopped and left without the man. Men of the 8th hid him and pledged never to return him.

Lieut. Col. Brown, seeing this incident as a grave breach of army discipline, took it upon himself to form the regiment and chastise them, but instead it strengthened their refusal to follow that order. Other regimental officers took umbrage at Brown's assumption of personal authority, but before matters came to a head, Washington D.C. reversed and ordered its forces not to return fugitives.

While knowing what was now forbidden, the troops did not know what was to be done with the crowds flocking into Butler's camps. 8th Vermont officers, due numbers of men sick, decided to hire three or four cooks from this group. A limited number were to be let into camp to interview. When word got out, a huge crowd appeared at the camp, all desiring the positions. The 8th found it hard to choose the cooks out of so many, and Col. Thomas had to figure out what should be done with the rest, so he sent them up the chain of command to Phelps, (Note: Phelps, born in Guilford, Vermont, a member of the West Point class of 1836, was an artilleryman who had served in the Seminole Wars in Florida, the Mexican–American War, and spent 1857–1859 with the Mormon Expedition. He resigned from the army in 1859 after 23 years. At the beginning of the Civil War, he lived in Brattleboro and he wrote forceful articles pointing out the danger of the constantly increasing political influence of the slave states. For more information, see his Wikipedia article, John W. Phelps) however the next morning, another crowd poured into camp. . This was happening top all regimental camps under Butler's purview, so he ordered his men to provide the fugitives with the quarters and rations. Soon, the approval of the 8th, Butler also encourage his troops to feed the black men, care for their sick, and employ them for any service in which they could be made available.

About this time, General Phelps began to organize and drill the contrabands, as they were then called, as soldiers. His requisition for muskets for three regiments men was disallowed, and Butler ordered him stop his to stop drilling black. In protest, Phelps resigned his commission. (Note: Again, for more information, see his Wikipedia article, John W. Phelps) Soon, Thomas also concluded that the blacks could and should be used as soldiers. Butler was won over by the Thomas' and his other commanders' arguments and began enlisting and arming the fugitives. As well as using them on infrastructure projects, Butler cited the precedents of Andrew Jackson and the local Confederate government to raise troops from the black population. He issued immediate orders to recruit two regiments from the fugitives who had come within the Union lines. These were officered with white men selected from the older regiments and proved to be excellent troops. Thomas soon had one of them in the field.

===== First combat =====
Throughout the 8th's first noths in Algiers, there were several false alarms of Rebel attack. A few patrols were sent out after reports of Rebel troops in the vicinity, but the men found the reports false or the Confederates had left. Early in June, reports of a small Confederate force at Thibodeaux (Note: A few days before this, the Confederate Governor Moore ordered to Brig. Gen. Martin, commanding the Louisiana militia, to attack the Union outposts and destroy the NOO&GW.) led to a three-company patrol under Maj. Dillingham were sent there. Crossing Bayou des Allemands in boats, they followed the NOO&GW to La Fourche Crossing, and leaving a strong guard, pushed on the remaining three miles to Thibodeaux. Few white people were seen on their arrival, stores were closed, and no Confederate soldiers were there. Dillingham found an iron foundry containing models and patterns for manufacturing arms, which he destroyed. On the return an old cannon, which the enemy had hidden away, was discovered, and brought back.

Patrols and large details for guard duty and special service frequently left the 8th with only three or four companies in camp. The regiment, however, had hardly seen an armed enemy. The men of the 8th were wondering when that first action would happen.

The proverbial first baptism of blood came to part a patrol on Sunday, June 22. On Friday, Company H, which had been at the extreme end of the operable line, had fallen back from La Fourche Crossing to Bayou des Allemands, when reports of Rebels tearing up track to the west caused Capt. Dutton to send a 30-man detachment under Lieutenants Franklin and Holton in a passenger car, pushed ahead of a locomotive, to investigate. No enemy was seen they saw a mounted man ride across the track as they approached at Raceland Station, seven miles out from their post. Franklin halted and sent forward an advance squad of six men on foot, following them slowly with the train. The advance guard was surprised by a volley from the lush vegetation beside the track. Franklin and Holton were severely wounded at the first fire, and the advance guard sprang back on the train. Despite his wounds, Franklin kept his wits, ordering his men in the car to kneel and fire from the windows, he jumped from the car and ran to the engine where the fireman lay dead and the engineer crouched in the iron-clad cab. Franklin told the engineer him to put on steam, and the man quickly reversed his engine running backwards with all possible speed.

The ambushing rebels then emerged from cover, and continued to fire upon the receding train. The train ran through a party of the Rebels, before they had time to wreck the track. While the patrol had cover in the car, the Rebels were in the open, and suffered from the patrol's fire from the windows of the car with fatal effect on three of them and wounding several. . Two of the advance guard were killed and left behind while three more were killed on the train, including the fireman in the locomotive cab. Franklin and Holton and seven others were wounded. the total was five killed and nine wounded. (Note: Federal authorities later found out the Confederate force engaged in this skirmish was a company of Louisiana militia under command of a Captain Dardon.)

Upon their return to Des Allemands, Dutton sent the wounded to the hospital at Algiers and reported the action. Thomas immediately sent Companies A, C, and I, to relieve Company H at Des Allemands, but the Rebels did attack nor return to destroy the rail line. The days turned into summer and the regiment continued its patrols and work details, but made no contact with the enemy. During July and August, the regiment picketed the right bank of the Mississippi for 13 miles from the "Cut-off road" below Algiers to the canal above, guarded the NOO&GW for 32 miles, to Bayou des Allemands, maintained order in the town, and arrested many citizens who attempted to pass out of the lines. Serious illness prevailed in the command, and three line officers died between July 22–24, causing the commissioning of NCOs from within the regiment to fill the vacancies. The 8th, as part of Phelps' brigade moved north to support Brig Gen. Thomas R. Williams attack at the Battle of Baton Rouge on Tuesday, August 5, but made no contact with the enemy and returned to Algiers.

A company of partisan rangers began firing on passing Union gunboats in the Mississippi River from Donaldsonville, Louisiana. This made Farragut furious and he threatened to bombard the town if the attacks did not stop. The attacks continued and on Saturday, August 9, several Union gunboats appeared before Donaldsonville. After allowing the inhabitants to evacuate, the gunboats opened fire on the town, then landing parties went ashore to burn down more buildings.

On August 20, Maj. Gen. Taylor (Note: Born in 1826, he was the youngest child of Zachary Taylor, the 12th president of the U.S. He started college studies at Harvard College in Cambridge, Massachusetts, and finished them at Yale, where he was a member of Skull and Bones, in 1845. for more information, see his Wikipedia article.) arrived from the east arrived at Opelousas, Louisiana, to assume command of Confederate forces opposing Butler. His task was to recruit soldiers, defend the district, and bring the partisan rangers under control or disband them. He owned Fashion, a large sugar cane plantation in St. Charles Parish, Louisiana, about 30 miles above Algiers, that enslaved labor force to nearly 200 people.He used his plantation as the gathering point for Texas cattle that was gathered to supply Rbel forces in his command.

On Sunday, August 31, Butler had learned of Taylor's activity at his plantation ordered the seizure of cattle there to benefit his own army and deprive Taylor of its use. Thomas, with Companies A and C, a section of artillery, and a company of cavalry, went out late Sunday afternoon. After an all-night march, they fell upon Rebels gathering the cattle early in the morning, when the cavalry began a sharp skirmish, and the artillery shelled a piece of woods and a sugar-cane field to drive out the enemy.

The expedition took about 2000 cattle, sheep, and mules, together with about 20 prisoners. Without making any halt, Thomas ordered his command about face and return, driving their booty before them. With large numbers of escaped slaves and their mules joining them, the force stretched from three to four miles. The U.S. troops moved as quickly as they could through the night for the bereft Confederates followed close behind. Thomas found it necessary to stop occasionally and fire a few shots at them, while the contrabands took control of the livestock. By 10:00 a.m., Monday, September 1, the troops, the fugitives, the prisoners, and the livestock were safe within the Union lines.

The Rebels, especially Taylor, who had lost the cattle, wanted revenge. He put together a force consisting of the Terrebonne and St. Charles militias and a Texas-Louisiana partisan ranger battalion led by Major James A. McWaters of the 2nd Louisiana Cavalry Regiment. This 1,500-man force overpowered a small detachment at Boutee station and easily captured them. They then set up an ambush on the daily trains running up and down the track that passed each other there. The Rebels turned the switches the wrong way on Thursday morning, September 4, and hid on either side of the track.

In areas where the track was vulnerable, a strong guard manned each train to resist any sudden attack. Captain Clark, of Company K, 60 man, and a 12-pound field gun escorted the Thursday Des Allemands train bound for Algiers riding in open flat cars. Unaware, they approached the station as usual, keeping a sharp lookout but seeing no danger. Suddenly the Rebels sprang to their feet and opened up a deadly fire upon the unprotected men, who were forced to run the gauntlet of leaden rain. The artillerymen were instantly cut clown, removing the piece from the action, but Clark ordered return fire. The unhurt engineer kept the train moving on a siding as the firing was rapid on both sides, and the guard owing to their exposed position were taking the worst of it.

The train would normally be out of range, but the enemy had turned the switch. Luckily for the outnumbered guard, a soldier saw it turned the wrong way and sprinted ahead through heavy fire, turned it back, let the train pass on, and boarded his car again unhurt. After they were out of range, only 25 of Clark's guar were unscathed; 13 were killed outright, 2 more mortally wounded, and 20 were more or less severely wounded, some of whom fell off the train and were captured by the enemy.

Shortly after getting beyond the Confederates touch, they met the train from Algiers, which saved the latter from the Rebels' plans, and both trains made for Algiers. Deprived of a second victim, the enemy set fire to the station buildings and houses in the vicinity, and then pushed rapidly up the track towards Des Allemands, held by a portion of Companies E, G, and K, under command of Capt. Hall, of Company E. Once in sight of pickets about half a mile from Des Allemands, the Rebel commander sent a flag of truce to Hall relating the action at Boutee and demanding immediate surrender to prevent needless bloodshed. Aware that he was outnumbered and low on ammunition, Hall surrendered.

As soon as the trains reached Algiers, Thomas reported the action to Butler, who immediately sent the 21st Indiana join Thomas at Boutee. A derailment enroute prevented Thomas from joing the Indianans. Thomas, unable to move further up the line, planned to go forward by water, and march across the country. But Butler countermanded the order, and on Friday, Thomas tightened his lines and pulled his pickets to within 12 miles of his camp. (Note: The men of the 8th felt Butler should have recognized Des Allemands' vulnerability.)

After this scrap, the Rebels sought to capitalize on their success. McWaters moved his rangers to St. Charles Court House where they were caught between two converging Union forces. On September 5 Colonel James W. McMillan had continued on landing downstream with the 21st Indiana and 4th Wisconsin Infantry Regiments while Colonel Halbert E. Paine landed upstream with the 9th Connecticut, 14th Maine, and 6th Michigan Infantry Regiments. Most of McWaters' rangers escaped into the swamps, but Federals killed two, wounded three, and captured 50 men, 300 horses, weapons, and equipment.

===== The Germans and captivity =====
The Rebel victory, the first in area since the loss of New Orleans, caused rejoicing among the Louisiana secessionists. Taylor had been told his local plantation class peers of the supposed excesses of Butler's troops and considered the prisoners of war (POWs) from the 8th as criminals, and felt they were responsible for theft from his plantation, (Note: Having learned that pictures, keepsakes, and clothing, taken from his own mansion with a disregard of the rights of personal property and that his property had been confiscated by a formal order found in the captured post, he was incensed.) later writing, "the den of that worthy never contained such multifarious 'loot' as did this Federal camp." On Tuesday, September 9, the former governor, Robert C. Wickliffe (Note: The Kentucky-born Wickliffe had been the 15th Governor of Louisiana from 1856 to 1860. He did not actively support secession and throughout the war, he tried to act as an intermediary between the Confederacy and the Union. For more in formation see his Wikipedia article.) came into Federal lines under truce relaying threats from Taylor to execute a number of these POWs. Butler's promised reciprocation's caused Taylor to change his mind.

As a result, no Vermonter was executed by Taylor for any alleged robbery. However, after the Union captured New Orleans, a number of German-Americans who become U.S. citizens enlisted in the 8th to make up for losses. Having opposed secession, they felt they were exercising rightful privilege as citizens of the U.S. by joining the regiment. Seven of them were the POWs from September 4. They were recognized by members of the Confederate guard who had formerly known them. As soon as this information reached Rebel headquarters, they decided that their names had been on the New Orleans conscription list and the Confederacy had a claim on them for military service despite them never having served. On this flimsy pretext the Germans were arrested as deserters, and denied POW status. Without allowing the Germans to communicate with their friends or prepare their defence, a quick court martial returned a guilty verdict condemning them to be publicly shot as deserters. The men of the 8th saw the act simply as a murder indicitave of the malignacy the "barbarism of slavery " that had infected Southern society. On Thusrday, October 23, a 70-man firing squad executed them along a shallow trench under some trees beside the railroad track and hastily buried.They were forced to dig their own graves, then were shot.

The men captured by the Confederates found the experience an ordeal. After the dust settled, the tally showed the regiment lost 142 men as (POWs). The remainder of the POWs were treated fairly, taken 100 miles by a detachment of Texas Rangers to Camp Pratt in near New Iberia, and sent to Vicksburg six weeks later. There their situation changed drastically as the POWs were robbed of all their clothing and blankets, except a few rags. They were kept in a jailyard remaining several weeks in a wretched condition exposed to the weatherstorm and cold with no fires to keep warm. Rations were scant and meager. Two native New Orleans unionists who had joined the regiment were recognized at Vicksburg and shot as Confederate deserters. Four Vermonters died while there.

After a further six weeks they learned that they would be paroled back to the federals. On Monday, November 10, while awaiting their exchange, their captors told them to cast lots. Two men would be shot in retaliation for Brig. Gen. McNeil's execution of two guerillas in Missouri. The next day, 126 men daid godbye to the unlucky two farewell and were taken to New Orleans and thence Ship Island to sit out their parole. These two were held for several months before being spared and paroled, but one died of illness before he reached Union lines.

The experience was so hard on the men that 25 of the 126 at Ship Island died shortly after arriving. Capt. Smith of Company K later wrote that only hald of the remainder returned to duty with the regiment. The parolees remained at Ship Island until February 1863 when the 50 healthy men returned to the regiment Camp Stevens, near Thibodeaux.

===== Federal operations in the fall of 1862 =====
For weeks the 8th Vermont remained at Algiers, and thought they would remain there, but when Brig. Gen. Weitzel (Note: A 6' 4" tall 26-year-old, was born as Gottfried in Winzeln, near Pirmasens in the Palatinate, which was then part of the Kingdom of Bavaria. His Bavarian military veteran father had emigrated to Cincinnati, Ohio in 1837, where his father changed his name to Godfrey in the Tenth Ward, which included the German "Over the Rhine" neighborhood. His father's activity in local politics got an appointment to West Point at just 14 (the minimum entrance age was 16) and the tall 15-year-old arrived months after his birthday. Nicknamed "Dutch," he did well and graduated 2nd out of 34 cadets in the Class of 1855 (his roommate Comstock was first). Fortuitously for Butler, his first assignment was improve the defenses of New Orleans under Major P.G.T. Beauregard. His work on Fort Jackson, Fort St. Philip and the Customs house gained a promotion to first lieutenant of engineers in 1860. In 1861, his company served as the bodyguard during the inauguration of U.S. President Abraham Lincoln. Initially assigned to construct defenses in Cincinnati and Washington, as well as the Army of the Potomac. For more information, see his Wikipedia article.) assumed command of the regiment's brigade, they broke up their camp and moved to a new field of operation. Weitzel, who had been Butler's chief of engineers and exhibited remarkable capacity for responsible command, was appointed brigadier general and given the command of the Reserve Brigade, then at Carrollton. The 8th was assigned to this command. Weitzel would prove to be a capable and popular commander. Weitzel selected his staff and detailed the 8th's Quartermaster Smith for his acting commissary.

====== Operations in LaFourche District ======
Butler, decided to launch a three-pronged expedition into the Bayou Lafourche region. Commander McKean Buchanan took four light-draft gunboats from New Orleans to Berwick Bay via the Gulf of Mexico. Thomas would take the 8th, the 1st, and 2nd Native Guards, which Butler had recently organized, and up the railroad dislodging Confederates from Des Allemands, and meet Weitzel at La Fourche Crossing. Butler tasked Weitzel's mhe main column of 5,000 soldiers to attack Taylor at Donaldsonville and Thibodeaux, occupy the La Fourche district, cut off the Rebels' cattle supplies from Texas permanently, and open the NOO&GW so loyal planters could send their sugar and cotton to the New Orleans market. Once done, he was to move into Bayou Teche, and, if practicable, make an incursion into Texas. The Navy would take Weitzel's main body upriver aboard 7 river transports to Donaldsonville. There he would drive out the Rebels, and then move by the country roads down the Bayou La Fourche to meet Thomas at La Fourche Crossing.. The two columns, uniting there, were to proceed to Brashear City, the western terminus of the NOO&GW, on Berwick Bay. A fleet of four gunboats was meanwhile to pass up the bay to Brashear and cut off the retreat of the enemy.

This operation began on Friday, October 24. On that day, the 1st Louisiana Native Guards, 1,500 strong reported Thomas. This was the first regiment of black troops actually armed in Louisiana. On Saturday, the two regiments, the 8th and the 1st, left Algiers and pushed up the railway. On the same day, Witzel's column of 5,000 soldiers aboard 7 river transports landed at a deserted, (Note: Of note, planters who tried to move their slaves away from the oncoming federals were beguiled by the apparent cheerfulness of their slaves to go with them. A ruse, large numbers of black males soon began freeing themselves each night stealing away in the darkness for U.S. Army lines.) ruined, burned Donaldsonville (Note: Despite later Lost Cause writers claiming that Weitzel's troops sacked a deserted town, Winters writes that two-thirds of Donaldsonville was already burned down by the retreating Rebels. Federal troops did finish the job and stripped it of its poultry, the only remaining livestock.) without opposition at 10:00 a.m. and drove out Col. William G. Vincent of the 2nd Louisiana Cavalry who withdrew his 850 men (Note: Winter writes that many of the Rebels were conscripts (on September 27, due to disappointing results of the first draft, the Confederacy expanded the draftable men to be all white men between 18 and 45) who were poorly equipped and actually looked forward to battle with the federal forces whom they held in low regard and saw as a source for winter clothing, food, and equipment.) south to Napoleonville on Bayou Lafourche.

Meanwhile, Thomas' movement was slow as he was under orders to put the line in running condition as he progressed. Despite the two regiments covering seven miles before bivouacking for the night, the opening of the remaining 20 miles would take great effort. A heavy growth of the long grass of the region had covered the rails with a matted troublesome mass of grass which blocked the wheels of the construction train. There was one way of effectually doing this, to pull it up with immense toil by their hands, as the men in the 8th had often weeded their gardens in Vermont. Initially reluctant considering it rather undignified work for soldiers, the 8th soon fell to work with a will, and the 1st joined them. The two regiments also discovered they needed to rebuild culverts that had been destroyed, and replace rails that had been torn up. Bent rails were straightened and re-laid, missing rails and sleepers replaced. The 8th's experience with the telegraph system helped as the two regiments also had to rebuild fifteen miles of telegraph line and poles. Thomas' column took two days to reach Boutee station, where they halted for the night on Monday, October 27.

Weitzel had marched out at dawn on Sunday, October 26, down the left (east) bank Bayou Lafourche until 1 mi (1.6 km) from Napoleonville, where the Union troops camped in battle order. He brought two large river flatboats dragged along the bayou by mules and liberated Black slaves, so that the troops could switch from one side of the bayou to the other. At 6:00 am on Monday, his force moved south. Weitzel moved the 8th New Hampshire and some cavalry led by to the right (west) bank with the flatboats. (Note: From the Wikipedia article on the battle, battle reports refer to right and left bank, which are from the perspective of an observer looking downstream. Since the Union force was moving downstream (south), their right flank was on the right bank (west) and their left flank was on the left bank (east).)

Weitzel's troops on the right bank, the 8th New Hampshire Infantry Regiment and two sections of the 1st Maine Light Artillery Battery moved faster than those on the left. On Monday, October 27, at 9:00 am near a settlement named Texas, these men met a battery and were briefly held up. The 1st Maine's counterbattery fire was very effective, and after losing their commander and running out of ammunition, the Rebel battery made a hasty retreat. Accordingly, the Rebel commander, Brig. Gen. Alfred Mouton (Note: B in Opelousas, Louisiana, the son of former Governor of Louisiana Alexandre Mouton, Mouton was an 1850 graduate of West Point who had been hesitant to go at first because he primarily spoke French and knew little English. Resigning his commission shortly after graduation, Mouton briefly worked as a civil engineer on the NOO&GW before farming sugar cane in Lafayette Parish, Louisiana where he served in the militia and slave patrols. For more information see his Wikipedia article.) withdrew his forces farther to the south. At 11:00 am, the Union force reached a position about 2 mi (3.2 km) north of Labadieville. Getting a report that Confederates were in considerable force ahead with six artillery pieces, Weitzel formed 75th New York, 13th Connecticut, and the 4th Massachusetts Battery, in battle order on the left (east) bank, and sent them forward through a sugarcane field. He also ordered the remaining two sections of the 1st Maine to the front for additional support.

Weitzel soon received a reports that there was fighting on the right bank facing infantry and artillery and that Rebel cavalry had in his rear. He sent his pioneers to form a bridge with the flatboats and cut a road through the levee. He sent eight companies of the 12th Connecticut across the span to the right bank keeping back a rearguard of the remaining 12th Connecticut, 1st Louisiana Cavalry, and a section of the 4th Massachusetts Battery. The Confederate artillery fired at the flatboats, but most of the shots went high. Discovering that his opposition on the left bank had vanished, he sent 13th Connecticut and two artillery over the bridge, keeping the 75th New York and the a section of the 4th Massachusett on the left bank.

On the right bank, the 8th New Hampshire met stiff resistance so Weitzel put the 12th Connecticut on the 8th New Hampshire's right flank and ordered both to attack. Their lines of advance diverged, and Weitzel had the 13th Connecticut plug the gap opening in the center. While the 8th New Hampshire stood firing, the other two regiments slowly advanced through ditches and briars almost unmolested since the Confederate gunners mostly fired too high. The Federals, some in battle for the first time, reached an open field where the opposing fire became more heavy. The Federals fired at will as they advanced, cursing at the top of their lungs, while Weitzel sat on his horse smoking a cigar. The Terrebonne militia appeared on the western flank, fired a volley at the Union troops, then fled. Finally, the Federals reached a point about 100 yd (91 m) from the 18th and 24th Louisiana Infantry, who defended a drainage ditch behind a fence near a plantation road at Georgia Landing. Suddenly, the Confederates panicked and fled, swarming out of the ditch and into the woods behind them. The Union soldiers rushed forward, cheering.

The Rebels' 2nd Louisiana Cavalry had started attacking the Union wagon train, but they pulled back after bumping into the 8th New Hampshire. They withdrew to Thibodaux by a roundabout path. Meanwhile, the Federal's 1st Louisiana Cavalry, the 13th Connecticut, and two guns pursued Mouton's retreating force for 30 minutes before halting.

====== Thomas' reopens the NOO&GW ======
On Tuesday, October 28, as he approached Des Allemands, Thomas expected a fight for its possession because reports from local blacks told of over 1,000 Rebel militia holding that position. Intent on continuing his task of repairing the track as he went, he mounted two field pieces on a platform car at the front of the train as a precaution and moved on. In the middle of Tuesday afternoon, they approached a curve in the road which, when rounded, would bring them in sight of Des Allemands. Thomas halted the repairs, formed his regiments for action, made a speech to the 1st Native Guards which elicited a cheer, and then sent the two regiments forward side by side. Making no contact with the enemy, they found the Confederates had spiked their artillery and departed the night before, after torching the railway station and burning behind them the long bridge over the bayou. The day ended with the 8th Vermont and 1st Louisiana in possession of des Allemands.

Once more, the 8th Vermont and 1st Native Guards set to the business of repairing the railroad. The regiments spent two clays rebuilding the burned bridge, with timber brought by train from Algiers. After making it safe and passable, Thomas resumed his advance up the line to La Fourche Crossing without any serious delay. Arriving there on Saturday, November 1, Weitzel ordered Thomas to continue opening the line up to Brashear City. Thomas rested his men for a day, and then on Sunday, continued his march along the railroad track to Brashear, repairing the road as he went. The 8th and the 1st Native were now becoming skilled at their engineering so that when they found the enemy had burned another bridge which was 675 feet in length, they knew what to do. The two regiments set about the work at once, actually cutting the timber in the adjacent woods and preparing it for use. In five days the job was finished, and the train passed across the new structure in safety. (Note: It was during this five-day period that the men of the 8th learned the full details of the execution of their German brethren at Des Allemands. Thomas and his staff gleaned this information from Rebel POWs that were on their way south to parole in New Orleans.)

During this period Thomas, aware that squads of the enemy were prowling about the country, threw out his pickets up and down the bayou, with strict orders to use every means to prevent surprises and sudden attacks. This resulted when shot an officer for refusing to obey a challenge to "halt, dismount, and give the countersign." Thomas, upon investigation, found that the blame lay with the officer who had refused to obey the order of the sentinel, and the soldier was following orders. Instead of punishing the man, Private Hutchins, he promoted him to sergeant of Company E for sticking to his orders.

During this work on the railway, the U.S. Army had learned of the executions of the regiment's German members in October when Weitzel's troops captured documents left by retreating Rebels at La Fourche Crossing. About the same time, Confederate POW taken by the Navy at Brashear City were sent to Thomas for safekeeping. The men of the 8th soon learned these men had belonged to some of the units that captured Capt. Hall's outpost at Des Allemands. Once Thomas heard the rumors, he and his the adjutant, the future Vermont governor John L. Barstow (Note: Born in Shelburne, Vermont, taught school from ages 15 until 25, in Vermont and Detroit. He returned to Shelburne in 1857 to help his aging parents with their farm, and in 1861, he was appointed as assistant clerk of the Vermont House of Representatives. Highly thought of by the men of the 8th, he was active in politics and eventually served as Vermont's 39th governor. For more information, see his Wikipedia article.) gathered these POWs in a hut by the railway. After a skillful interrogation, some of these POWs·confessed to participating and gave him the full details. Thomas and Barstow wrote up a detailed report of their findings on the murders and sent it to Butler.

In this period, President Lincoln gave Maj. Gen. Nathaniel Banks command of the Army of the Gulf, and asked him to organize a force of 30,000 new recruits, drawn from New York and New England. (Note: As a former governor of Massachusetts, he was politically connected to the governors of these states, and the recruitment effort was successful.) In December he sailed from New York with a large force of raw recruits to relieve Butler. (Note: Another major political player in the Commonwealth, Butler disliked Banks, but welcomed him to New Orleans and briefed him on civil and military affairs of importance. Gideon Welles, Secretary of the Navy, thought Banks was not a good choice as he thought him a less capable leader and administrator than Butler. Banks had to contend not just with Southern opposition to the occupation of New Orleans, but also to politically hostile Radical Republicans both in the city and in Washington, who criticized his moderate approach to administration For more information, see his Wikipedia article.) When Butler received Thomas's report of the murder of the men of the 8th, Butler promised to prosecute those Rebels responsible and launched a further investigation. However, when Banks relieved Butler on December 15, 1862, to the bitterness of the men of the 8th, he dropped any further investigations into the incident.

By Monday, December 8, they had reached Brashear City and met the U.S. Navy gunboats in Berwick Bay. The two regiments had opened up rail and telegraph communications for the 80-mile length of railway between Algiers and Berwick Bay. (Note: In his report, Butler commended the 8th, "I cannot too much commend the energy of Colonel Thomas, with his regiment, the Eighth Vermont, who have in six days opened 52 miles of road, built nine culverts, rebuilt a bridge (burned by the enemy) 435 feet long, besides pulling up the rank grass from the track, which entirely impeded the locomotives all the way. In this work they were assisted by Colonel Stafford's regiment, Native Guards (colored)." Thomas wrote of the movement from Algiers to LaFourche, "The command pulled the luxuriant grass from over twenty miles of track, built eighteen culverts from ten to twenty feet in length; rebuilt what was estimated as four miles of track; rebuilt a bridge four hundred and seventy-five feet long; drove the enemy from the road, and captured seven cannon, all in one week.") The regiment would garrison Brashear through December and into the new year.

==== Port Hudson ====
It moved with the XIX Corps to take Port Hudson, Louisiana, in April 1863. In the battle which followed on May 27, it lost 12 men, including the brigade commander, and had 76 wounded.

=== Eastern theater ===
==== Battle of Cedar Creek ====
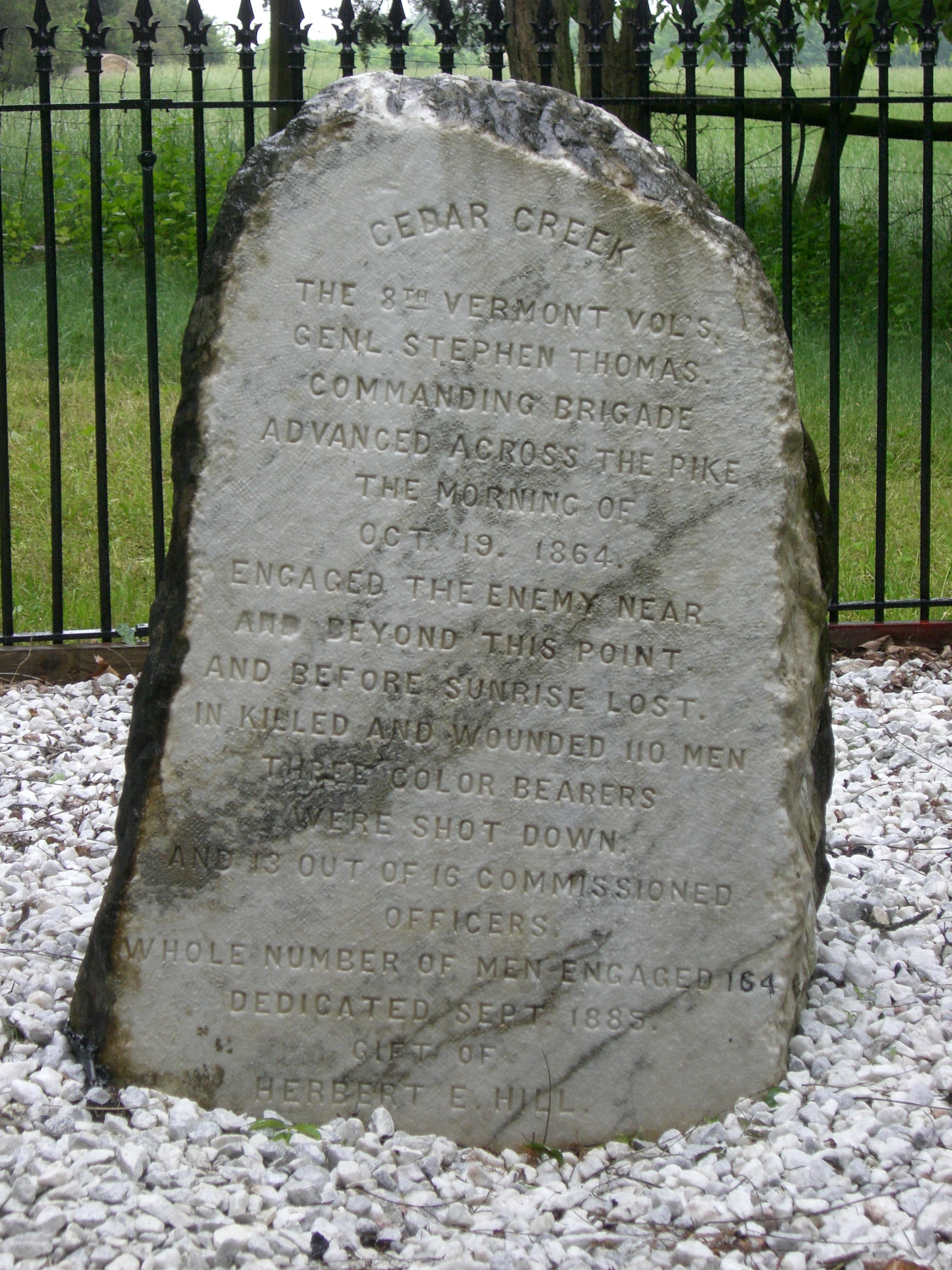
8th Vermont monument at Cedar Creek Battlefield

During the Battle of Cedar Creek, the 8th Vermont Infantry played a critical role in the fighting. In the early morning fog of 19 October 1864, confederates crossed Cedar Creek near Strasburg, Virginia, and attacked Union forces in their camps. After routing the Union's VIII Corps, the Confederate attack struck at the XIX Corps. While the XIX Corps fought back from entrenched position, a second Confederate Corps joined the battle flanking their trenches. In order to escape the trap Brigadier General William H. Emory, commander of the XIX Corps, ordered the 2nd Brigade of his First Division to move forward, engage, and delay the two Confederate Corps.

At the time of the battle, the 2nd Brigade was composed of four under-strength units, the 47th Pennsylvania Infantry Regiment, the 12th Connecticut Infantry, the 160th New York Infantry, and the 8th Vermont Infantry. The brigade was commanded by Colonel Stephen Thomas, who had previously commanded the 8th Vermont. As ordered, the brigade advanced several hundred yards beyond the Federal lines and engaged the vastly superior Confederate forces in brutal hand-to-hand combat. Their stubborn fight held up the Confederate attack for thirty minutes, allowing the rest of the XIX Corps to withdraw and join forces with the VI Corps about a mile to their rear near Belle Grove Plantation. The 47th Pennsylvania Infantry, on the Brigade's extreme right flank, was almost immediately overrun, hindered by a dense fog and Union 8th Corps men fleeing through its line. They were pinned down in a ravine and systematically decimated as their black knapsacks stood out in the swirling fog. As mounting casualties reduced the 2nd Brigade's combat effectiveness, Col. Thomas successfully withdrew his brigade, the 8th Vermont Infantry being the last unit to withdraw.

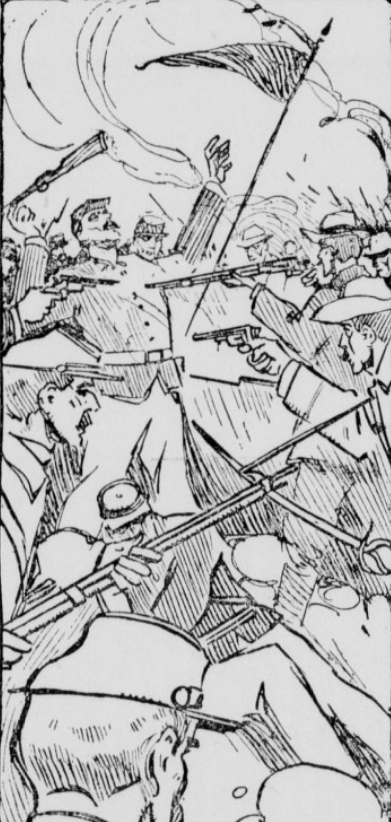
1904 illustration of the 8th Vermont fighting for their flag at Cedar Creek

In this short engagement, the casualty rates were extremely high in all of the 2nd Brigade units, especially the 8th Vermont. Of 164 Vermont men, 110 were killed or wounded along with 13 of their 16 officers. The fight was described by one Vermont veteran:

Suddenly a mass of rebels confronted the flags, and with hoarse shouts demanded their surrender. Defiant shouts went back. "Never!" "Never!" A rebel soldier then leveled his musket and shot Corporal Petre, who held the colors. He cried out: "Boys, leave me; take care of yourselves and the flag!" But in that vortex of hell men did not forget the colors; and as Petrie fell and crawled away to die, they were instantly seized and borne aloft by Corporal Perham, and were as quickly demanded again by a rebel who eagerly attempted to grasp them; but Sergeant Shores of the guard placed his musket at the man's breast and fired, instantly killing him. ] But now another flash, and a cruel bullet from the dead rebel's companion killed Corporal Perham, and the colors fell to the earth. Once more, amide terrific yells, the colors went up, this time held by Corporal Blanchard—and the carnage went on. (George N. Carpenter, 8th Vermont)

Despite the heavy fighting and the loss of three color bearers, the 8th Vermont Infantry did not give up their flag and withdrew in good order. Falling back slowly, they rejoin the rest of the XIX Corps around Belle Grove plantation. The 8th Vermont continued to fight all day, ultimately helping to turn the dawn route at Cedar Creek into a major Union victory.

In 1883, a monument of Vermont marble was placed at the site where the 8th Vermont made their stand. The monument was paid for by Herbert E. Hill, a Vermont businessman who wanted to honor his state's Civil War heroes. The monument is located in its original place on the battlefield about 150 yards east of the Valley Pike, now U.S. Route 11 between Middletown and Strasburg, Virginia. The monument was well maintained under recent private ownership. In 2012, the property was acquired by Cedar Creek and Belle Grove National Historical Park, which provides visitor access, though currently only through ranger-led programs.

On October 19, 2014 a Vermont Roadside Historic Site Marker commemorating the Vermont soldiers who took part in the battle, including the 8th Vermont Regiment, was unveiled on US Route 11 in Middletown. The marker was put up on the edge of the Cedar Creek Battlefield and is the only Vermont Roadside Historic Site Marker outside the State of Vermont.

Cedar Creek was the last active engagement in which the 8th Vermont Infantry Regiment participated.

The regiment mustered out of service on June 28, 1865.

== Regimental organization ==
The 8th Vermont's organization was as follows:

=== Regimental staff ===
Through its service, the commanders were:

- Colonels — Stephen Thomas, John B. Mead

The staff officers were:

- Lieutenant Colonels — Edward W. Brown, Charles Dillingham, Henry F. Dutton, John B. Mead, Alvin B. Franklin
- Majors — Charles Dillingham, Luman M. Grout, Henry F. Dutton, John L. Barstow, John B. Mead, Alvin B. Franklin, Henry M. Pollard
- Adjutant — John L. Barstow
- Quartermaster — Fred E. Smith
- Surgeon — George F. Gale
- Assistant Surgeon — Herman H. Gillett
- Chaplain — Francis C. Williams

The non-commissioned staff were:

- Sergeant Major — George N. Carpenter,
- Quartermaster Sergeant — J. Elliott Smith
- Commissary Sergeant — Lewis Child
- Drum Major — Gershom H. Flagg
- Hospital Steward — Samuel H. Currier

=== Companies ===
The companies at the onset were commanded as follows:

- Company A — Captain Luman M. Grout (Note: Recruited in Lamoille and Washington countiesA was originally intended for the Sixth Regiment, but before the ranks were entirely full, it was sent to Montpelier, where the adjutant general of the state planned to separate them and assign them to different companies to fill out the Sixth. Due to the men's objections, it was returned to Hyde Park, to remain until it reached its full complement. This occurred on November 13, and the men immediately elected Grout as captain.)
- Company B — Captain Charles B. Child (Note: Recruited by Charles B. Child, assisted by Stephen F. Spalding, Fred D. Butterfield, and John Bisbee, during the months of November and December. The company benefited from Spalding's serviced with the ninety-days' volunteers who answered to the first call. He began drilling them at Derby Line and preparing them for active service. The recruiting was finished December 14, and the men elected Child as the commander and Spalding as his First Lieutenant. When they joined the regiment at Brattleboro, they were assigned to the left of the line.)
- Company C — Captain Henry E. Foster (Note: Recruited in Caledonia county, and principally in the town of St. Johnsbury. Foster recruited and organized it about ten days after B. It became the color company of the regiment. On Christmas 1862, the men elected Foster as Captain.)
- Company D — Captain Cyrus B. Leach (Note: Recruited mainly from Bradford with small groups from Fairlee, West Fairlee, Corinth, Topsham, Newbury, and Thetford in Orange county. It was recruited by the men who were elected as its commissioned officers. It finished organizing December 28, 1862 and joined the regiment Leach as its Captain.)
- Company E — Captain Edward Hall (Note: Recruited at Worcester, in Washington county by Hall, Kilbourn Day, and T. P. Kellogg, it organized January 1, 1862, and elected the men who recruited them as its officers.)
- Company F — Captain Hiram E. Perkins (Note: F was the sixth company to report at Brattleboro. The members were recruited mostly in Franklin county, and completed the organization by electing Perkins as Captain on January 3. It reported in Brattleboro on January 8 under command of Perkins.)
- Company G — Captain Samuel G. P. Craig (Note: This was Orange County's second company. Craig and John B. Mead enlisted the men over six weeks. Ny January 7, it was full, and elected Craig to command.)
- Company H — Captain Henry F. Dutton (Note: H was raised in Windham county by Dutton assisted by Alvin B. Franklin, W. H. H. Holton, S. E. Howard, and W. H. Smith. It was organized January 17th, and chose Dutton as Captain, Franklin as First Lieutenant, and Holton as Second Lieutenant.)
- Company I — Captain William W. Lynde (Note: I was recruited by Lynde with the help of George N, Holland and George E. Selleck. The men enlisted during the months of December and January, and rendezvoused at Williamsville, where they were drilled by Selleck. On January 17, the company organized, and elected as officers Captain Lynde, First Lieutenant Holland, and Second Lieutenant, Joshua C. Morse.)
- Company K — Captain John S. Clark (Note: Company K was the last to report and completed the 8th Regiment. It was recruited by Clark and elected its three commissioned officers January 22, 1862 with Captain Clark, First Lieutenant A, J. Howard, and Second Lientenatit, George F. French.)

== Affiliations, battle honors, detailed service, and casualties ==
=== Organizational affiliation ===
Its assignments are as follows:

- Attached to Phelps' 1st Brigade, Department of the Gulf, to October 1862
- Attached to Weitzel's Reserve Brigade, Department of the Gulf, to January 1863.
- 2nd Brigade, 1st Division, XIX Corps, Department of the Gulf, to July 1863
- 3rd Brigade, 1st Division, XIX Corps, Department of the Gulf, to February 1864
- 1st Brigade, 1st Division, XIX Corps, Department of the Gulf, to July 1864
- 2nd Brigade, 1st Division, XIX Corps, Army of the Shenandoah, Middle Military Division to March 1865
- 2nd Brigade, 1st Division, XIX Corps, Army of the Shenandoah, to March 1865
- 2nd Brigade, 1st Provisionial Division, Army of the Shenandoah, to April 1865
- 2nd Brigade, 1st Division, Defences of Washington, 22nd Corps, to June 1865.

=== List of battles ===
The official list of battles in which the regiment bore a part:

- Occupation of New Orleans - May, 1862.
- Boutte Station and Bayou Des Allemands - Sept. 4, 1862.
- Steamer Cotton - Jan. 14, 1863.
- Bisland - - - April 12, 1863.
- Port Hudson
- Port Hudson
  - Port Hudson, assault, - - May 27, 1863.
  - Port Hudson, night engagement, ----- June 10, 1863.
  - Port Hudson, assault, - - - June 14, 1863.
- Opequon - Sept. 19, 1864.
- Fisher's Hill - Sept. 21 and 22, 1864.
- Cedar Creek - Oct. 19, 1864.
- Newtown, Nov. 12, 1864,

=== Detailed Service ===
The 8th Vermont's detailed service is as follows

==== 1862 ====
- Left State for New York March 14.
- Sailed for Ship Island, Miss., March 19
- Arrived April 6.
- Moved from Ship Island to New Orleans May 7–8,
- Duty there and at Algiers and guarding Opelousas Railroad till September
- Bayou des Allemands June 20 and 22
- Raceland Station June 22
- St. Charles Station August 29 (Companies A and C)
- Bote Station September 4 (Company K)
- Operations in La Fourche District October 24-November 6
- Georgia Landing, near Labadieville, October 27
- Repair railroad to Brashear City November 1-December 8
- At Brashear City till January 13, 1863

==== 1863 ====
- Action with Steamer Cotten on Bayou Teche January 14
- At Camp Stevens, Bayou Boeuf, and at Brashear City till March
- Operations on Bayou Plaquemine, Black and Atchafalaya Rivers February 12–28
- Operations against Port Hudson March 7–27
- Operations in Western Louisiana April 9-May 14
- Teche Campaign April 11–20
- Fort Bisland, near Centreville, April 12–13
- Jeanerette April 14
- Expedition to Alexandria on Red River May 5–17
- Moved from Alexandria to Port Hudson May 17–25
- Siege of Port Hudson May 25-July 9
  - Assaults on Port Hudson May 27 and June 14
  - Surrender of Port Hudson July 9
- Duty at Thibodeaux July 31-September 1
- Sabine Pass Expedition September 3–11
- Western Louisiana ("Teche") Campaign October 3-November 30
- At New Iberia till January 6, 1864

==== 1864 ====
- March to Franklin and duty there till March 8
- Moved to Algiers March 8
- Veteranized January 28
- Veterans on furlough in Vermont April 7 to June 3
- Non-Veterans at Algiers till May 6, and at Thibodeaux till June 5
- Non-Veterans left for home June 5, and mustered out June 22
- Veterans moved from home to Department of the Gulf May 25-June 3
- Moved to Alexandria June 8–11
- Expedition to Tunica Bend June 19–21
- Moved to Algiers July 2
- Sailed to Fortress Monroe, Va., July 5–12
- Moved to Washington, D. C., July 12–13
- Pursuit of Early to Snicker's Gap July 14–21
- Sheridan's Shenandoah Valley Campaign August 7-November 28
  - Battle of Opequan, Winchester, September 19
  - Fisher's Hill September 22
  - Battle of Cedar Creek October 19
- At Newtown till December 20
- At Summit Point till April 4, 1865

==== 1865 ====
- Hancock's operations in the Valley April 4–15
- Moved to Washington April 21
- Duty there till June. Grand Review May 23–24
- Mustered out June 28

=== Casualties ===
During the course of the war, a total of 1,772 men served in the 8th Vermont Infantry. Of that number, the unit lost during its term of service: 104 men were killed and mortally wounded, 8 died from accident, 20 died in Confederate prisons, and 213 died from disease; for a total loss of 345 men.

== Notable members ==
- John L. Barstow, later governor, served in the 8th Vermont
- Henry W. Downs, Medal of Honor recipient
- William H. Gilmore, regimental quartermaster sergeant, served as Adjutant General of the Vermont National Guard.
- Squire E. Howard, recipient of the Medal of Honor.
- Henry Moses Pollard, Congressman from Missouri, was a veteran of the 8th Vermont.
- Captain Samuel Walker Shattuck, mathematician
- Stephen Thomas, Medal of Honor recipient and later lieutenant governor, commanded the regiment as a colonel.
