= 24th Louisiana Infantry Regiment =

Infantry regiment of the Confederate States Army

24th Louisiana Infantry Regiment Consolidated Crescent Regiment
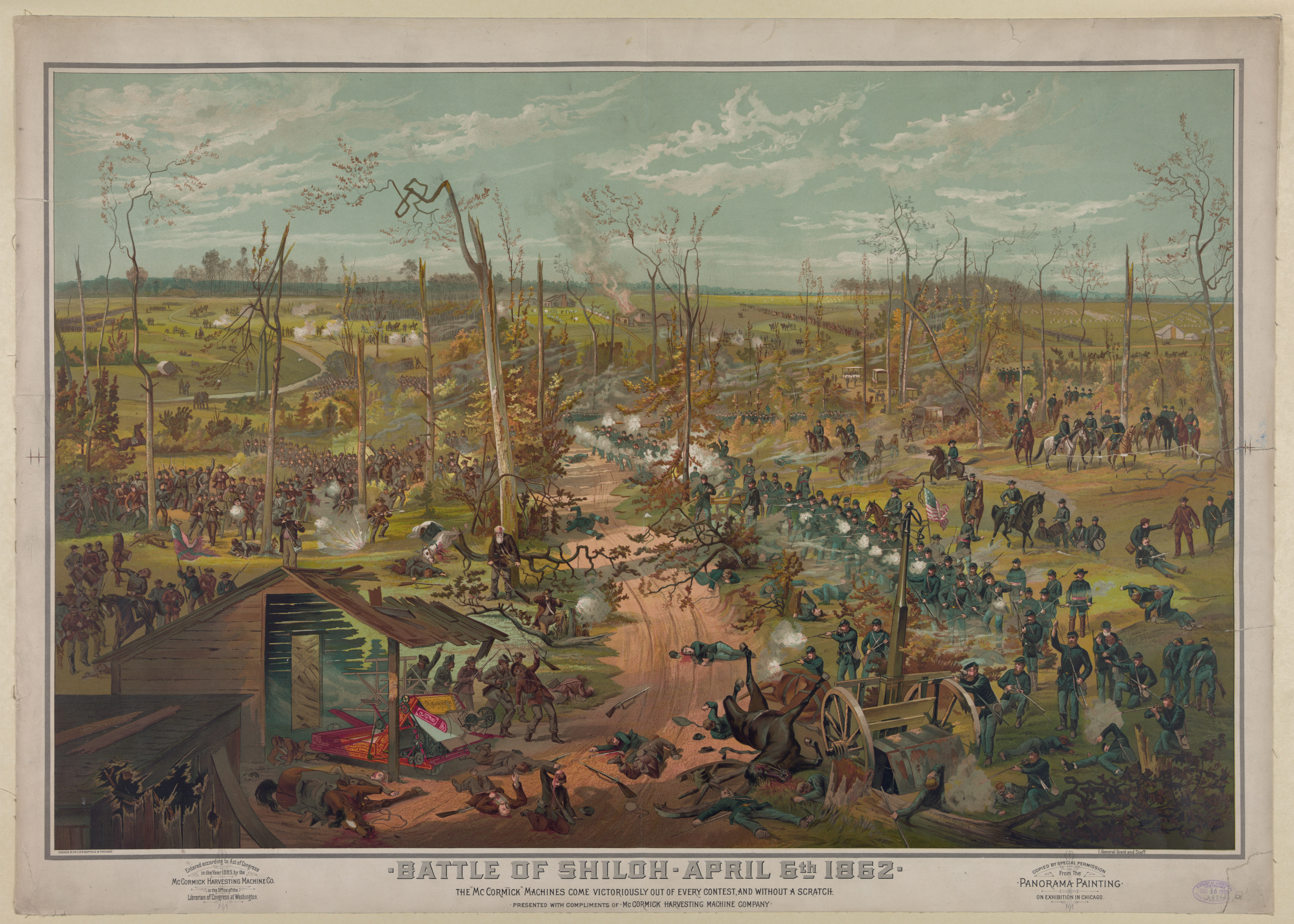
- The regiment would see its first fighting at the Battle of Shiloh on 6–7 April 1862.
- Active: 6 March 1862 – 19 May 1865
- Country: Confederate States of America
- Allegiance: Louisiana
- Branch: Confederate States Army
- Type: Infantry
- Size: Regiment (945 men, Mar. 1862)
- Part of: Pond's, Mouton's, and Gray's Brigades
- Nickname: Crescent Regiment
- Engagements: American Civil War; Battle of Shiloh (1862); Siege of Corinth (1862); Battle of Georgia Landing (1862); Battle of Fort Bisland (1863); Battle of Mansfield (1864); Battle of Pleasant Hill (1864); Battle of Yellow Bayou (1864)

Commanders
- Notable commanders: George P. McPheeters

The 24th Louisiana Infantry Regiment was a unit of volunteers recruited in Louisiana that fought in the Confederate States Army during the American Civil War. The Crescent Regiment, a state militia unit, transferred to Confederate service at New Orleans in March 1862 for a 90-day enlistment. The regiment immediately traveled to join the Confederate army at Corinth, Mississippi, and fought at Shiloh and First Corinth. The regiment disbanded in June at the end of its term of service, most of the men joining the 18th Louisiana Infantry Regiment. The regiment was revived at New Iberia, Louisiana, in September 1862, where it was rejoined by the men in the 18th Louisiana. It fought at Georgia Landing (Labadieville) in October 1862 and at Fort Bisland in April 1863. In November 1863 at Simmesport, the regiment merged with the 11th and 12th Louisiana Infantry Battalions, becoming the Consolidated Crescent Regiment. The new regiment fought at Mansfield, Pleasant Hill, and Yellow Bayou in April and May 1864. At Mansfield, all three field officers were fatalities and 175 soldiers became casualties. The regiment spent the rest of the war in Arkansas and Louisiana before disbanding in May 1865.

== See also ==
- List of Louisiana Confederate Civil War units
- Louisiana in the Civil War
