= Louis Bush =

Louis or Lewis Bush may refer to:

- Louis Jean Bush, 19th-century Louisiana politician
- Lewis Bush (1969–2011), American football player
- Lewis Bush (photographer) (born 1988), British photographer
- Lewis Bush (soldier) (died 1777), American Revolutionary War officer

== See also ==
- Lou Busch (1910–1979), American musician
