= Battle of Georgia Landing =

Battle of the American Civil War

Coordinates: 29.8604°N 90.9811°W

- Part of the American Civil War
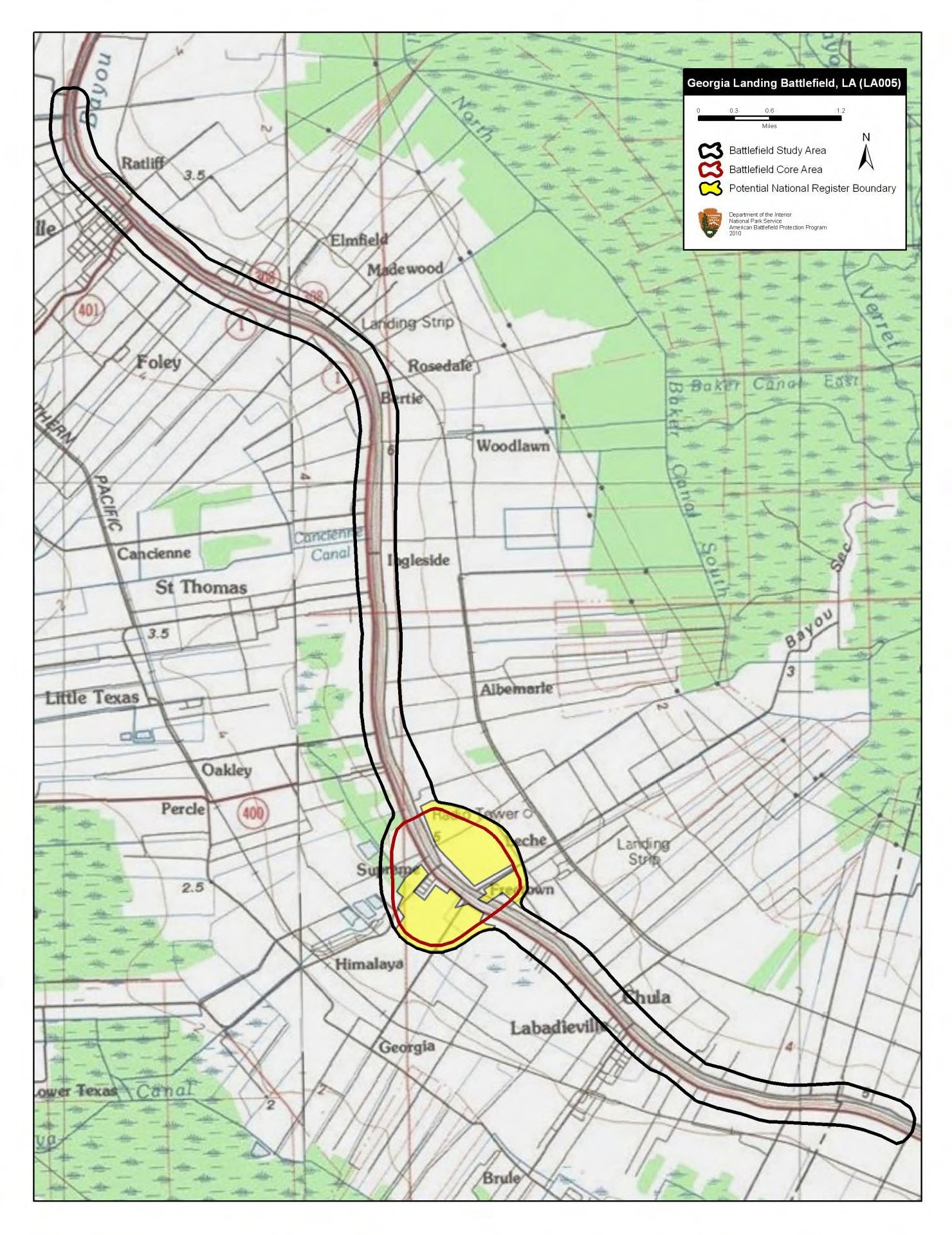
- Map of Georgia Landing Battlefield core and study areas by the American Battlefield Protection Program.
Date	October 27, 1862
Location	Assumption Parish, Louisiana
Result	Union victory

Belligerents
United States (Union)	(Confederate States of America) CSA (Confederacy)

Commanders and leaders
Godfrey Weitzel	Alfred Mouton

Units involved
Department of the Gulf	Department of West Louisiana

Strength
4,000, 2 batteries	1,392, 2 batteries

Casualties and losses
86–97	199–229, 1 gun

The Battle of Georgia Landing or Battle of Labadieville (October 27, 1862) was fought between a Union Army force led by Brigadier General Godfrey Weitzel and a Confederate States Army force commanded by Brigadier General Alfred Mouton near Labadieville, Assumption Parish, Louisiana, during the American Civil War. After a sharp clash, the Union troops compelled Mouton's outnumbered force to retreat.

Major General Benjamin F. Butler ordered a three-pronged invasion of the Bayou Lafourche district. Weitzel's force disembarked at Donaldsonville on the Mississippi River and moved south down Bayou Lafourche. After being defeated, Mouton's command withdrew up Bayou Teche. Weitzel and the other Union forces occupied Brashear City (now Morgan City), Thibodaux, and the railroad connecting those towns with New Orleans. The military operation caused many African-American slaves to escape into Union-held areas.

== Background ==
=== Capture of New Orleans ===
The Capture of New Orleans was accomplished by a joint Army-Navy expedition led by Flag Officer David G. Farragut and Major General Butler. In the Battle of Forts Jackson and St. Philip, Farragut's fleet successfully steamed past the forts and appeared before the defenseless city on April 25, 1862. The garrisons of the two forts surrendered on April 28, the city formally surrendered on April 29, and Butler's troops occupied New Orleans on May 1. Butler immediately began his "efficient and controversial" administration of the captured city.

In June 1862, Brigadier General John W. Phelps, one of Butler's subordinates and an ardent abolitionist, began recruiting and training free and formerly enslaved African Americans as soldiers. Phelps' initiative was premature, and Butler did not approve; Phelps was sent home in September. However, by then Butler had warmed to the idea and formed two regiments of so-called Native Guards with white officers and Black enlisted men.

=== Operations ===
A company of partisan rangers began firing on passing Union gunboats in the Mississippi River from Donaldsonville, Louisiana. This made Farragut furious and he threatened to bombard the town if the attacks did not stop. The attacks continued and on August 9, several Union gunboats appeared before Donaldsonville. After allowing the inhabitants to evacuate, the gunboats opened fire on the town, then landing parties went ashore to burn down more buildings. On August 20, Major General Richard Taylor arrived at Opelousas, Louisiana, to assume command over the Confederate Department of West Louisiana. His task was to recruit soldiers, defend the district, and bring the partisan rangers under control or disband them.

Soon after seizing New Orleans, Butler established small Union garrisons at Boutte Station and Des Allemands on the railroad between Brashear City and Algiers, opposite New Orleans. In early September, a Confederate force led by Brigadier General John G. Pratt set out to capture both garrisons. The force consisted of the Terrebonne and St. Charles militias and a Texas-Louisiana partisan ranger battalion led by Major James A. McWaters of the 2nd Louisiana Cavalry Regiment. On September 4, the Confederates overpowered the garrisons, killing 9, wounding 27, and capturing 155 men and 3 guns.

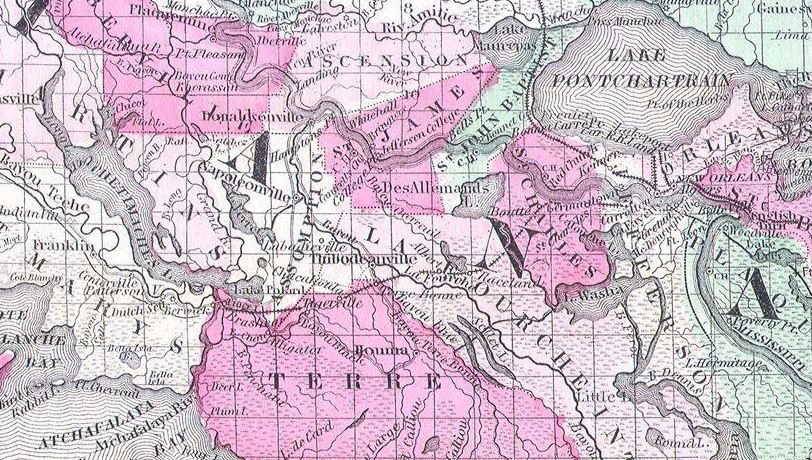
Lafourche campaign, October 1862: Weitzel's main column moved south from Donaldsonville down Bayou Lafourche. Thomas' column moved west from New Orleans along the railroad. Buchanan's gunboats entered the Atchafalaya River at lower left.

Attempting to exploit his success, McWaters moved his rangers to St. Charles Court House where they were caught between two converging Union forces. Colonel James W. McMillan landed downstream with the 21st Indiana and 4th Wisconsin Infantry Regiments while Colonel Halbert E. Paine landed upstream with the 9th Connecticut, 14th Maine, and 6th Michigan Infantry Regiments. Most of McWaters' rangers escaped into the swamps, but the Federals killed 2, wounded 3, and captured 50 men, 300 horses, weapons, and equipment.

Butler, commanding the Department of the Gulf, launched a three-pronged expedition into the Bayou Lafourche region. Commander McKean Buchanan took four light-draft gunboats from New Orleans to Berwick Bay via the Gulf of Mexico. Colonel Stephen Thomas with the 8th Vermont Infantry Regiment and the 1st Native Guards marched from Algiers to Thibodaux along the railroad. This column was later reinforced by the 2nd Native Guards. The main column consisted of Weitzel and 5,000 soldiers aboard 7 river transports. These troops landed at Donaldsonville on October 25 and sacked what was left of the town. Colonel William G. Vincent of the 2nd Louisiana Cavalry withdrew his 850 Confederate defenders south to Napoleonville on Bayou Lafourche.

== Battle ==
=== Order of Battle ===
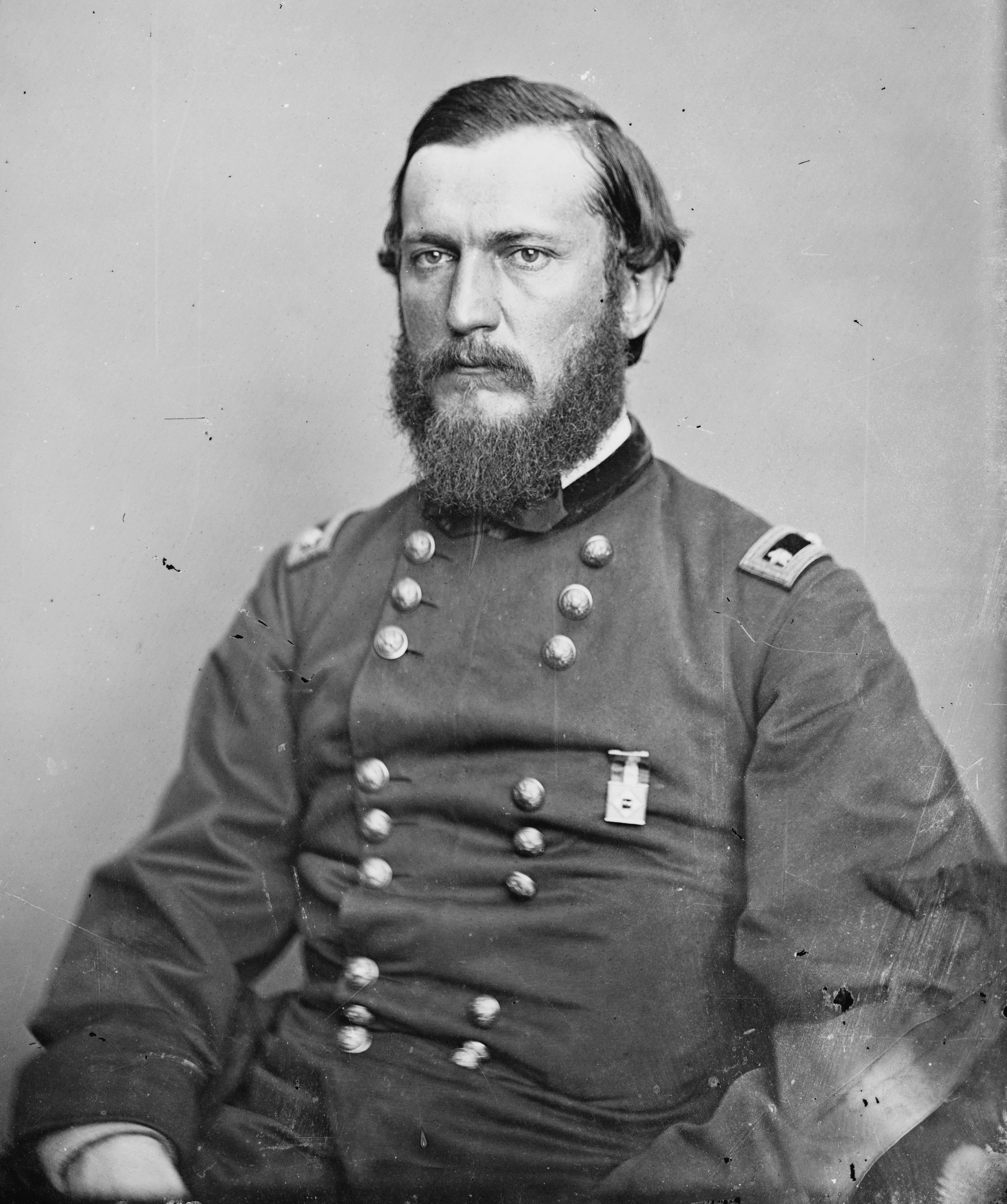
Godfrey Weitzel

Weitzel's Reserve Brigade included the 8th Vermont (detached), 12th Connecticut, 13th Connecticut, 1st Louisiana, and 75th New York Infantry Regiments, the 1st Maine Battery and 4th Massachusetts Battery, Companies A and B, 1st Louisiana Cavalry, and Company B, Massachusetts Cavalry Battalion. The 8th New Hampshire Infantry Regiment was also attached to Weitzel's command. Weitzel left Colonel Richard Holcomb's 1st Louisiana to hold Donaldsonville and marched south on Bayou Lafourche with the rest of his troops in unseasonably cold weather. Holcomb's men began constructing Fort Butler at Donaldsonville. (Note: According to Weitzel's casualty report, Company C, 1st Louisiana Cavalry was also attached. (Official Records, p. 172))

Mouton commanded the Confederate forces in the area. To prevent his force from being outflanked, Mouton deployed his troops on both banks of Bayou Lafourche. See the Confederate order of battle table below. At this time, Taylor was supervising the layout of defenses on the lower Red River and he did not become aware of the fighting until October 31. The 33rd Louisiana was formed on October 10 at Donaldsonville by consolidating the 10th and 12th Louisiana Infantry Battalions. The merger was unpopular with the soldiers and the new regiment did not fight well at Georgia Landing. Taylor discontinued the regiment on November 22 and restored the two original battalions.

Confederate order of battle for the Battle of Georgia Landing
Brigade	Position	Unit	Strength
Brigadier General; Alfred Mouton (1,392 men)	Right Bank Forces (539 men)	18th Louisiana Infantry Regiment	240
Brigadier General; Alfred Mouton (1,392 men)	Right Bank Forces (539 men)	24th Louisiana Infantry Regiment (Crescent)	135
Brigadier General; Alfred Mouton (1,392 men)	Right Bank Forces (539 men)	George Ralston's Mississippi Battery	64
Brigadier General; Alfred Mouton (1,392 men)	Right Bank Forces (539 men)	Cavalry detachment	100
Brigadier General; Alfred Mouton (1,392 men)	Left Bank Forces (853 men)	33rd Louisiana Infantry Regiment	594
Brigadier General; Alfred Mouton (1,392 men)	Left Bank Forces (853 men)	Terre Bonne Militia	34
Brigadier General; Alfred Mouton (1,392 men)	Left Bank Forces (853 men)	Oliver J. Semmes' 1st Louisiana Regular Battery	75
Brigadier General; Alfred Mouton (1,392 men)	Left Bank Forces (853 men)	2nd Louisiana Cavalry Regiment	150

=== Action ===
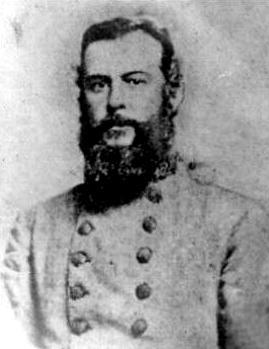
Alfred Mouton

On October 26, Weitzel's force started early and marched down the left (east) bank Bayou Lafourche until 1 mi (1.6 km) from Napoleonville, where the Union troops camped in battle order. Weitzel had two large river flatboats dragged along the bayou by mules and liberated Black slaves, so that he could switch his troops from one side of the bayou to the other. At 6:00 am on October 27, the Union soldiers took up the march south. Using the flatboats, Weitzel moved the 8th New Hampshire and some cavalry led by Lieutenant Solon A. Perkins to the right (west) bank. (Note: Reports of the battle refer to right and left bank, which are from the perspective of an observer looking downstream. Since the Union force was moving downstream (south), their right flank was on the right bank (west) and their left flank was on the left bank (east). The Confederate right flank was confusingly on the left bank.)

The Union troops on the right bank moved more swiftly than those on the left bank. At 9:00 am near a settlement named Texas, they encountered Ralston's battery and were briefly held up. However, the Union artillery inflicted some damage on Ralston's battery. After losing their commander and running out of ammunition, Ralston's battery made a hasty retreat. Accordingly, Mouton withdrew his forces farther to the south. At 11:00 am, the Union force reached a position about 2 mi (3.2 km) north of Labadieville. Getting a report that Confederates were in considerable force ahead and that they had 6 artillery pieces, Weitzel formed the 75th New York, 13th Connecticut, and Thompson's battery in battle order on the left (east) bank. These troops moved forward through a sugarcane field. He also ordered 4 of the 6 guns from Carruth's battery to move to the front. (Note: Weitzel's report only identified his batteries by the names of their commanders. It did not say which officer led the 1st Maine and which led the 4th Massachusetts.)

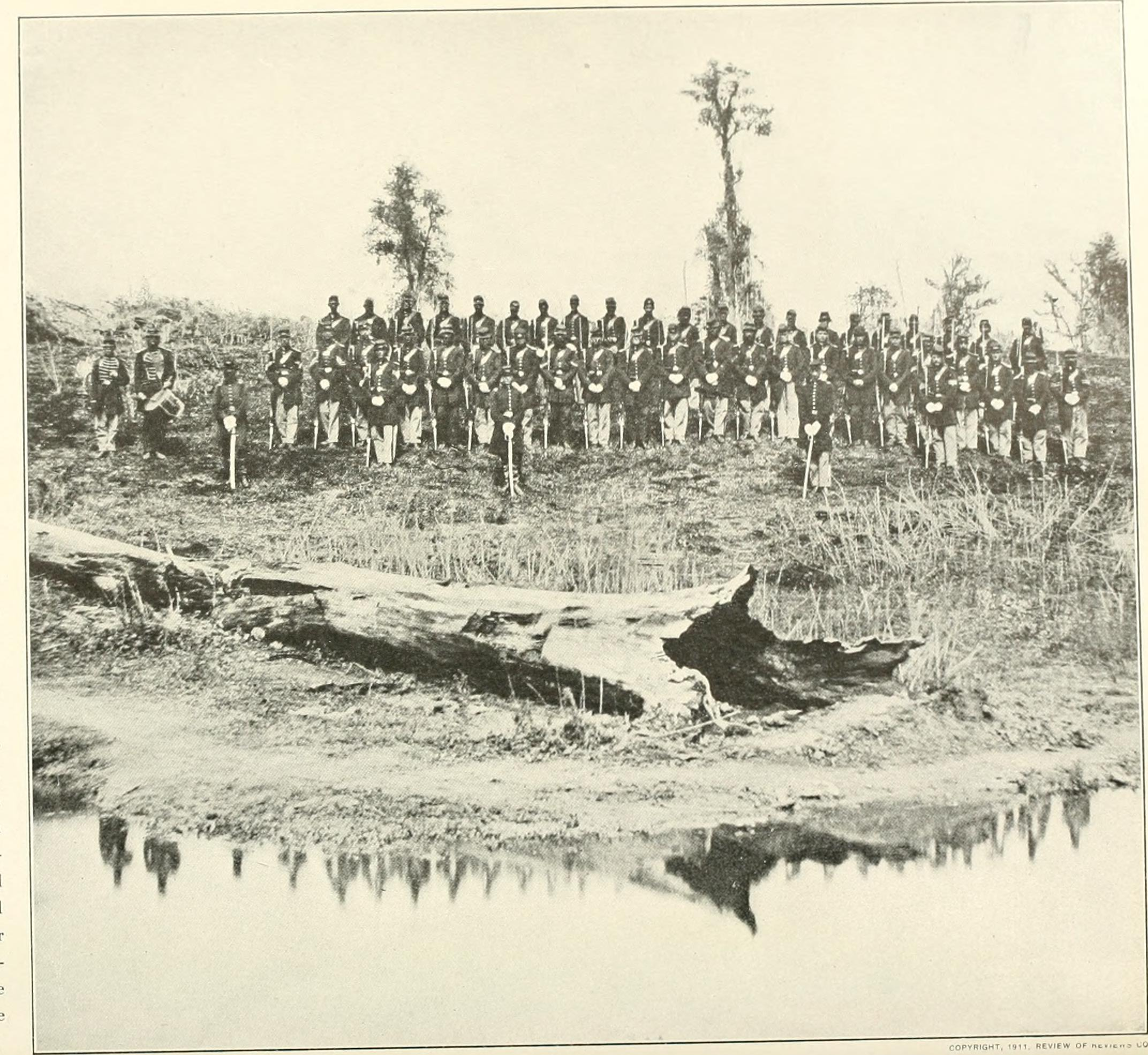
Part of the 13th Connecticut Infantry

At this time, Weitzel received a report that there was fighting on the right bank and that there were 4 Confederate guns there. Another messenger reported Confederate cavalry had gotten behind the rearguard. Weitzel ordered his pioneers to form a bridge with the flatboats and to cut a road through the levee. He sent 8 companies of the 12th Connecticut across the improvised span to the right bank. Weitzel held back a rearguard of 2 companies of the 12th Connecticut, Williamson's cavalry, and 2 of Carruth's guns (these were 12-pounder howitzers). The Confederate artillery fired at the flatboats, but most of the shots went high. Discovering that the Confederates on the left bank had vanished, Weitzel sent the 13th Connecticut and 4 of Carruth's guns to the right bank, keeping the 75th New York and Thompson's battery on the left bank.

On the right bank, the 8th New Hampshire encountered stiff resistance and it began falling back in some disorder. Placing the 12th Connecticut on the 8th New Hampshire's right, Weitzel ordered both to attack. Since their lines of advance diverged, Weitzel ordered the 13th Connecticut to fill the gap opening in the center. While the 8th New Hampshire blazed away, the other two regiments slowly advanced through ditches and briars. Fortunately for the Federals, the Confederate gunners mostly fired too high. The Union troops, in battle for the first time, reached an open field where the opposing fire became more heavy. The Federals fired at will as they advanced, cursing at the top of their lungs, while Weitzel sat on his horse smoking a cigar. The Terrebonne militia appeared on the western flank, fired a volley at the Union troops, then fled. Finally, the Federals reached a point about 100 yd (91 m) from the 18th and 24th Louisiana Infantry, who defended a drainage ditch behind a fence. They were posted on the left of Ralston's battery near a plantation road at Georgia Landing. Suddenly, the Confederates panicked and fled, swarming out of the ditch and into the woods behind them. The Union soldiers rushed forward, cheering.

The 2nd Louisiana Cavalry started attacking the Union wagon train, but they pulled back after bumping into the 8th New Hampshire. The Confederate cavalry withdrew to Thibodaux by a roundabout path. Meanwhile, Perkins' cavalry, the 13th Connecticut, and two guns pursued Mouton's retreating force for 30 minutes before halting.

=== Losses ===
Weitzel reported 2 officers and 16 men killed, 1 officer and 73 men wounded, and 1 officer and 4 men captured. Mouton reported losing 5 killed, 8 wounded, and 186 missing. Colonel George P. McPheeters of the 24th Louisiana was among the dead. The National Park Service listed 86 casualties out of 4,000 Union soldiers and 229 casualties out of 1,329 Confederates. Weitzel claimed that his soldiers buried 5 Confederates and that 17 wounded were among the captured. He claimed 166 Confederates captured on the day of battle and 42 afterward. The Union troops captured the wounded Ralston and one artillery piece.

Union losses for the Battle of Georgia Landing
Unit	Killed	Wounded	Missing	Total
12th Connecticut Infantry Regiment	3	16	1	20
13th Connecticut Infantry Regiment	1	5	1	7
1st Louisiana Cavalry, Companies A, B, C	1	18	1	20
8th New Hampshire Infantry Regiment	12	35	1	48
75th New York Infantry Regiment	1	0	1	2
Cumulative totals	18	74	5	97

== Aftermath ==
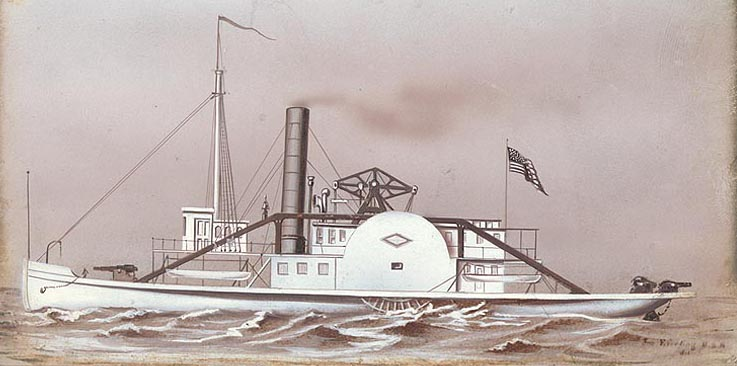
USS Calhoun

On October 28, Mouton's force withdrew to Thibodaux where they burned the railroad depot, bridges, sugar, and other supplies before abandoning the place. Weitzel's troops arrived at Thibodaux later that day. Mouton received news about Thomas' column and the naval expedition. Mouton loaded his soldiers aboard a train that took them to Brashear City (now Morgan City). During the battle on October 27, Mouton ordered Colonel T. E. Vick at Des Allemands to abandon the place and join him with 500 men from the Lafourche Militia and 300 men detached from the 33rd Louisiana. Through a miscommunication, a railroad train that was supposed to transport the soldiers, failed to do so, and the men were forced to march. Vick's men, many of whom were conscripts, straggled badly and numbers were captured by Union troops. Vick only brought in 82 men, who boarded a train at Terrebonne Station.

At dusk on November 1, the gunboats USS Calhoun, USS Diana, USS Estrella, and USS Kinsman appeared in Berwick Bay. The Confederate gunboat CSS J. A. Cotton and the steamers Hart and Launch No. 1 successfully withdrew up Bayou Teche. A third steamer, the Seger was deliberately grounded by its master, allowing it to be seized by the Federal gunboats. Mouton abandoned Brashear City and took a defensive position on the Teche near its junction with the Atchafalaya River. Some plantation owners took a pro-Union oath and were allowed to remain in the Lafourche district as long as they paid their former slaves a wage. Other terrified residents fled the district, trying to take their Black slaves with them, though large numbers of slaves ran away to Union-held areas.

== Former slaves ==
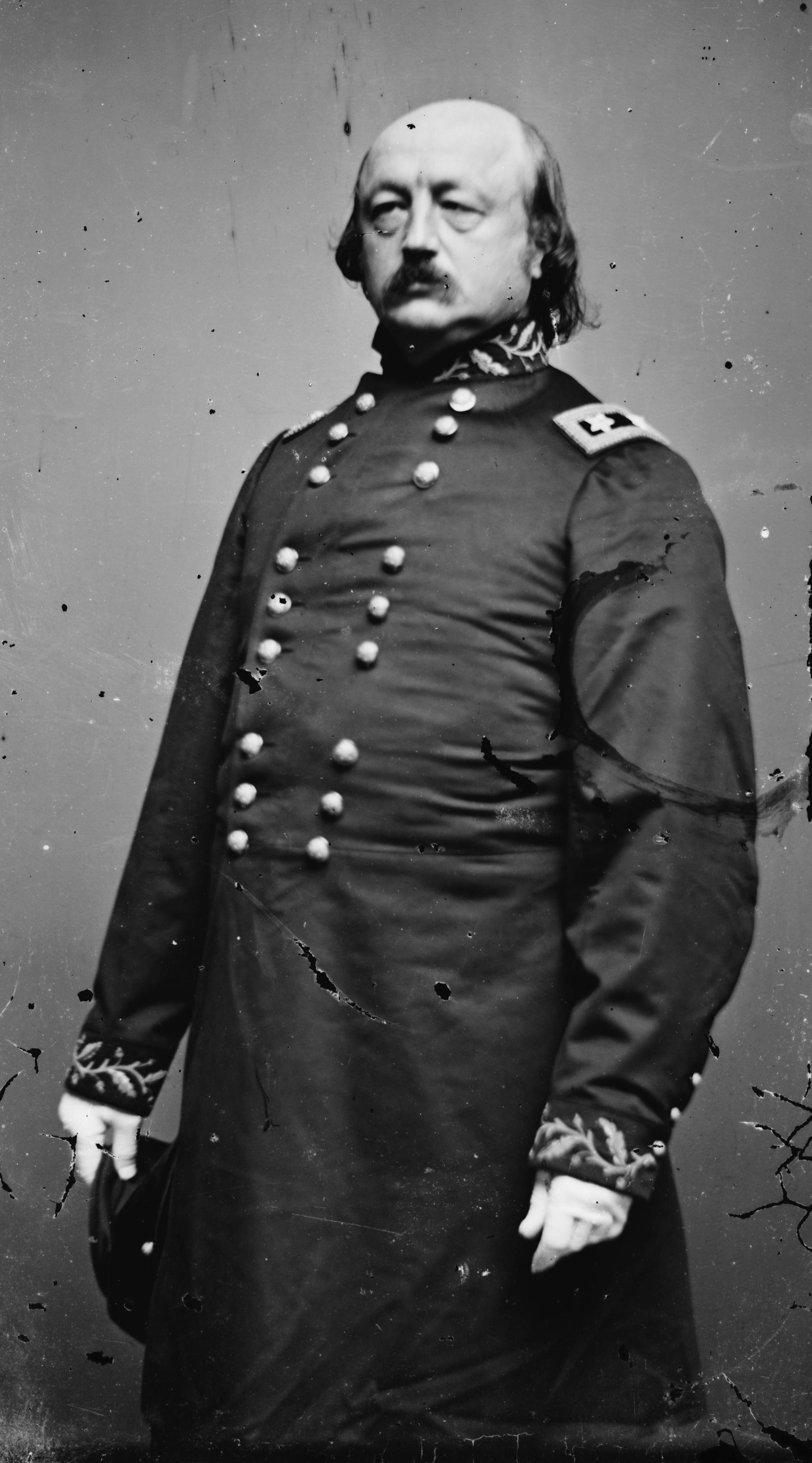
Benjamin Butler

Weitzel's Union columns were swollen by large numbers of runaway Black slaves and their families. On November 1, Weitzel complained to Butler that he had twice as many African Americans as he had soldiers in his camps. There were not enough rations to feed the multitude so that the former slaves stole food from the farms and plantations that they passed through. However, Union soldiers also stole livestock and personal possessions from the inhabitants. Butler urged Weitzel to put the former slaves to work for $10 per month on the plantations owned by those who had taken the oath.

On November 5, 1862, Weitzel wrote a letter to Butler refusing to assume command over the Native Guard regiments, in which he stated he had no confidence. He feared that the appearance of Black soldiers might cause a slave insurrection and that the white inhabitants were in terror. Butler praised Weitzel for his successful operation, then chided him for his refusal to accept command of the African-American regiments. He wrote Weitzel that it was not the appearance of the two Native Guard regiments that caused the commotion. Instead, it was the appearance of Federal soldiers in an area where, "negroes outnumber whites ten to one", that caused the local white population to be terrified. Butler went on to argue that responsibility for the state of affairs was not Weitzel's but those who began the war against the United States government. Two years later, on December 3, 1864, 33 African-American regiments belonging to the Union Army of the James were reorganized into the XXV Corps. Ironically, Weitzel – the same officer who had no confidence in Black soldiers in November 1862 – was named its first commander. Weitzel led XXV Corps from its inception to January 1, 1865, and again from February 2, 1865 to January 8, 1866.

== Notes ==
Footnotes

Citations
