= Samuel Walker Shattuck =

American mathematician

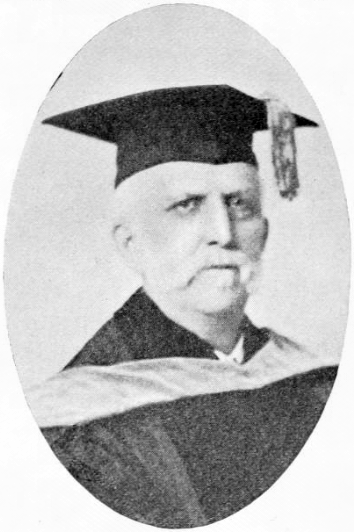
- Born: February 18, 1841; Groton, Massachusetts, US
- Died: February 13, 1913 (aged 71); Champaign, Illinois, US
- Education: Norwich University
- Occupation: Academic
- Spouse: Adelaide L. White (m. 1866–1914)
- Children: 4

Samuel Walker Shattuck (February 18, 1841 – February 13, 1913) was an American academic from Massachusetts. He graduated from Norwich University in Vermont and taught at the school until 1867, with a break to serve in the Civil War. He then accepted a position at Illinois Industrial University (today the University of Illinois at Urbana–Champaign), where he taught for the next forty-four years (1868–1912).

== Biography ==
Samuel Walker Shattuck was born in Groton, Massachusetts, on February 18, 1841. He attended preparatory school at Lawrence Academy at Groton, then studied at Norwich University in Vermont, where he joined the Alpha Chapter of Theta Chi fraternity. Following his graduation in 1860, he was appointed an instructor of mathematics at Norwich. Shattuck resigned his position upon the outbreak of the Civil War, becoming an adjutant of the 8th Vermont Infantry. He was wounded during the Battle of Cedar Creek on October 19, 1864, and was named a captain the next month. He was mustered out with his unit in June 1865. Shattuck then returned to Norwich University as an adjunct professor of mathematics and military tactics. From 1866 to 1867, he was acting president of the school.

Shattuck resigned from his position in the summer of 1868 to join the new Illinois Industrial University in Urbana, Illinois. He was named a professor of civil engineering two years later and was appointed a professor of mathematics in 1871. He was acting regent of the school for six months in 1873, then assumed the role of business agent and manager until 1905. He was then named comptroller of the university, serving until his retirement on September 1, 1912. The university presented him with an honorary Doctor of Laws. The Carnegie Foundation for the Advancement of Teaching presented him with a retiring allowance for his service.

Shattuck married Adelaide L. White on August 14, 1866; she died in August 1914. They had four children: Charles W., Anna, Edith A., and Walter F. Anna married fellow Illinois professor Arthur Wilson Palmer in 1893. Samuel Walker Shattuck died on February 13, 1913, at the home of his daughter in Champaign, Illinois. He had been in ill health for two years. A brief account of Shattuck's university service was read to students on the day of his funeral. He was buried in Mount Home Cemetery and Mausoleum in Urbana.
