= Louis Jean Bush =

Politician in Louisiana

Speaker of the Louisiana House of Representatives
- In office 1877–1878
- Preceded by: Michael Hahn
- Succeeded by: John Conway Moncure

Personal details
- Born: December 20, 1820 Iberville Parish, Louisiana
- Died: August 10, 1892 (aged 71) Palmyra, Wisconsin
- Party: Democratic

Louis Jean Bush (December 20, 1820 – August 10, 1892) was a lawyer, democratic politician, Confederate officer and businessman in Louisiana. Despite opposing secession, he was sent as a delegate to the Louisiana State Secession Convention and served as an officer in the Confederate Army. He was a critic of Reconstruction policies, owned a sugar and molasses business, and was elected as the 37th Speaker of the Louisiana House of Representatives from 1877 to 1878. He represented Orleans Parish from 1876 to 1878 as part of the Democratic Party in the LA House of Representatives. After his political service, he served in a law firm called Louis Bush & Son and served as the Vice-President of the American Protective League for Louisiana. Only a few months before his death, he served as the President of the New Orleans Board of Trade, which was an enterprise composed of NOLA Chamber of Commerce and the NOLA Produce Exchange.

He was also involved in establishing Thibodaux College.

== Early Life ==
Louis Jean Bush was born on December 20, 1820 in the Iberville Parish, Louisiana. He was the son of Reuben Bush and Mary Ludivine Brasset. Before his service in the American Civil War, he served as an attorney, court clerk and sheriff in Thibodeaux, Louisiana. He first married Josephine Gueno, then Celeste Grisham. He had five children between 1844 and 1866.

== Civil War ==
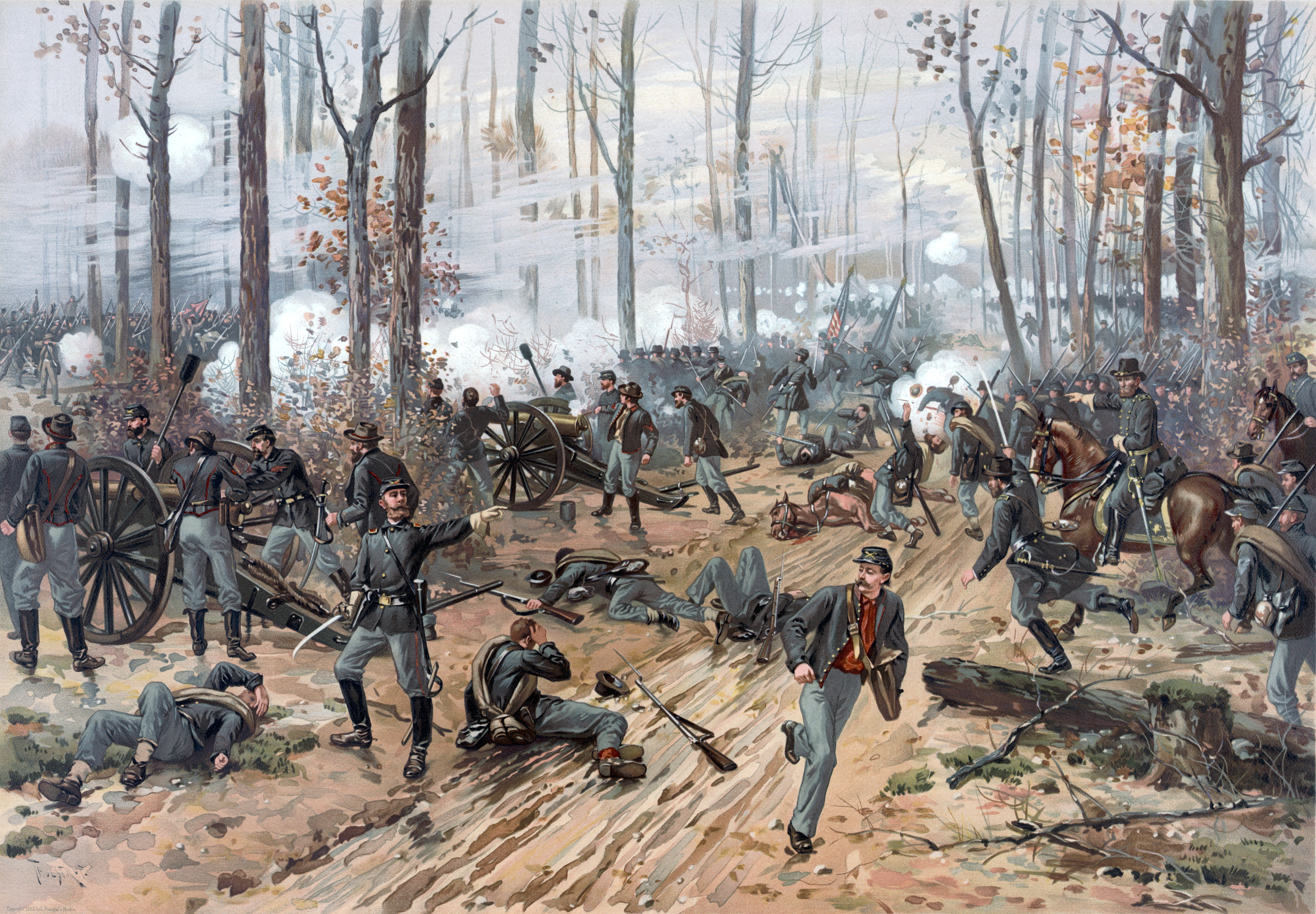
The Battle of Shiloh (April 6-8, 1862)

The Red River Campaign (1864)

Louis J. Bush enlisted for the Confederacy on October 5, 1861 and raised a company becoming their captain until early 1862. Bush served Confederates in reconnaissance missions towards Pittsburg Landing and stationed near Monterey in March until participating in the Battle of Shiloh. Bush then served in the Siege of Corinth and later took on the role of Major F and S of the 18th Louisiana Infantry Regiment in their organization. By June and July 1862, Bush was elected as a lieutenant-colonel for the 18th Louisiana Infantry regiment, but was declined commission. Following his decline, he served on the staff of Gen. Alfred Mouton until he raised a calvary regiment in June of 1863. Bush was commissioned as Colonel of the 802 men of the 7th Louisiana Cavalry Regiment in June, 1863. Bush continued to serve as Colonel when the 7th Louisiana was reorganized into the 4th Louisiana Cavalry Regiment, which operated out of the Colonel William Vincent's Brigade of General James P. Major's First Division. Bush was assigned with organizing the regiment at Moundville on March 13, 1864. It would be here that Colonel Bush would participate in the Red River Campaign, specifically at Crump's Hill and Wilson's Farm. After these engagements, Bush reverted to the commanding the regiment from the reserves of Gen. Richard Taylor during the Battles of Mansfield and Pleasant Hill. Bush's regiment continued to serve until the end of the War.

== See also ==
- List of speakers of the Louisiana House of Representatives
