= Squire E. Howard =

Massachusetts politician (1840–1912)

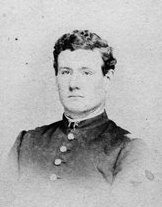
- Born: May 15, 1840; Jamaica, Vermont
- Died: November 26, 1912 (aged 72); West Newton, Massachusetts
- Burial place: Newton Cemetery, Newton, Massachusetts
- Military career
- Allegiance: United States of America; Union
- Branch: United States Army; Union Army
- Rank: Captain
- Units: Company H, 8th Vermont Infantry
- Awards: Medal of Honor

Squire Edward Howard (May 15, 1840 – November 26, 1912) was a Medal of Honor recipient who served for the United States Army during the American Civil War.

== Civil War ==
Howard enlisted into in Company H of the 8th Vermont Volunteer Infantry Regiment. (Note: The 8th Vermont was raised for service in the Department of the Gulf. It served in there in Louisiana and then in Virginia, from February 1862 to June 1865. It was a member of the XIX Corps before transferring to Virginia. See its Wikipedia article for more information.) a three-year infantry regiment in the Union Army during the American Civil War. Union Army at Townshend, Vermont, as a sergeant. Shortly after arrival in New Orleans, he was promoted to first sergeant of his company. First Sergeant Howard was wounded in his regiment's baptism of fire in the ambush at Bayou Des Allemands train station on September 22, 1862 where despite his wounds he helped conduct the defensive fire in response to the attack. After this combat he contracted malaria causing him to spend six weeks recovering at the home of a local Unionist. He recovered to continue service in Louisiana and later in Virginia. He was commissioned as a second lieutenant in January 1863. He saw action at the Third Battle of Winchester and the Battle of Cedar Creek and was discharged as a captain in December 1864.

== Medal of Honor citation ==
"The President of the United States of America, in the name of Congress, takes pleasure in presenting the Medal of Honor to First Sergeant Squire Edward Howard, United States Army, for extraordinary heroism on 14 January 1863, while serving with Company H, 8th Vermont Infantry, in action at Bayou Teche, Louisiana. First Sergeant Howard voluntarily carried an important message through the heavy fire of the enemy to bring aid and save the gunboat Calhoun."

== Postwar ==
Howard was active in veterans affairs after the war and served on the committee that commissioned George Carpenter's regimental history in 1886. (Note: As a member of that committee, he was responsible for helping Carpenter with the preparation of the statistical tables, and relating his account of the Battle of Cedar Creek.) He also wrote the introductory narrative for Adjutant General Theodore S. Peck's Revised Roster of Vermont Volunteers and lists of Vermonters Who Served in the Army and Navy of the United States During the War of the Rebellion, 1861-66 which was published in 1892.

Howard was awarded the Medal of Honor on January 29, 1894 for his actions on January 14, 1863, during the Bayou Teche Campaign.

== See also ==
- List of Medal of Honor recipients
