= 33rd Louisiana Infantry Regiment =

Infantry regiment of the Confederate States Army

- Flag of Louisiana (February 1861)
- Active: 10 Oct. 1862 – 22 Nov. 1862
- Country: Confederate States of America
- Allegiance: Louisiana
- Branch: Confederate States Army
- Type: Infantry
- Size: Regiment (594 men, Oct. 1862)
- Engagements: American Civil War; Battle of Georgia Landing (1862)

Commanders
- Notable commanders: Franklin H. Clack

The 33rd Louisiana Infantry Regiment was a short-lived unit of volunteers recruited in Louisiana that fought in the Confederate States Army during the American Civil War. The unit was created by consolidating the 10th and 12th Louisiana Infantry Battalions near Donaldsonville, Louisiana, on 10 October 1862. Part of the regiment fought poorly in the Battle of Georgia Landing (Labadieville) on 27 October. Because the consolidation was deeply unpopular, Major General Richard Taylor broke up the regiment on 22 November 1862 and restored the two original battalion organizations.

== See also ==
- List of Louisiana Confederate Civil War units
- Louisiana in the Civil War
