= 18th Louisiana Infantry Regiment =

Infantry regiment of the Confederate States Army

18th Louisiana Infantry Regiment 18th Consolidated Louisiana Regiment
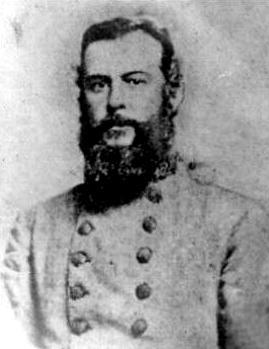
- Alfred Mouton was the regiment's first commander. He was later promoted to brigadier general.
- Active: 5 October 1861 – 19 May 1865
- Country: Confederate States of America
- Allegiance: Louisiana
- Branch: Confederate States Army
- Type: Infantry
- Size: Regiment
- Part of: Pond's, Mouton's, and Gray's Brigades
- Engagements: American Civil War; Battle of Shiloh (1862); Siege of Corinth (1862); Battle of Georgia Landing (1862); Battle of Fort Bisland (1863); Battle of Mansfield (1864); Battle of Pleasant Hill (1864); Battle of Yellow Bayou (1864)

Commanders
- Notable commanders: Alfred Mouton

The 18th Louisiana Infantry Regiment was a unit of volunteers recruited in Louisiana that fought in the Confederate States Army during the American Civil War. The regiment began forming in October 1861, but did not reach its full complement of 10 companies until January 1862. It served throughout the war in the Western Theater of the American Civil War. In 1862, the regiment served at Shiloh, First Corinth and Georgia Landing (Labadieville). Captain, later Colonel, Louis Jean Bush was noted to have served under General Alfred Mouton during these engagements. In 1863, it fought at Fort Bisland and campaigned in south Louisiana. In November 1863, the unit merged with the 10th Louisiana Infantry Battalion, creating the 18th Consolidated Louisiana Infantry Regiment. The new regiment served during the Red River campaign in 1864, fighting at Mansfield, Pleasant Hill, and Yellow Bayou. The regiment remained in Louisiana and Arkansas for the rest of the war, before disbanding in May 1865.

== See also ==
- List of Louisiana Confederate Civil War units
- Louisiana in the Civil War
