= 75th New York Infantry Regiment =

- Active: November 26, 1861 to August 23, 1865
- Country: United States
- Allegiance: Union
- Branch: Infantry, Mounted Infantry
- Nickname(s): 2nd Auburn Regiment
- Engagements: Battle of Georgia Landing; Bayou Teche Campaign; Battle of Fort Bisland; Siege of Port Hudson; Second Battle of Sabine Pass; Red River Campaign (non-veterans); First Battle of Deep Bottom; Third Battle of Winchester; Battle of Fisher's Hill; Battle of Cedar Creek

The 75th New York Infantry Regiment ("2nd Auburn Regiment") was an infantry and mounted infantry regiment in the Union Army during the American Civil War.

== Service ==
The 75th New York Infantry was organized at Auburn, New York and nine companies mustered in for three years service on November 26, 1861 under the command of Colonel John A. Dodge. Company K joined the regiment June 24, 1862.

The regiment was attached to District of Santa Rosa Island, Department of Florida, to February 1862. District of Santa Rosa Island, Department of the Gulf, to March 1862. Western District of Florida, Department of the South, to August 1862. Pensacola, Florida, Division of West Florida, Department of the Gulf, to September 1862. Weitzel's Reserve Brigade, Department of the Gulf, to January 1863. 2nd Brigade, 1st Division, XIX Corps, Department of the Gulf, to July 1863. 3rd Brigade, 1st Division, XIX Corps, to October 1863. Unassigned, Cavalry Division, Department of the Gulf, to December 1863. 1st Brigade, Cavalry Division, Department of the Gulf, to June 1864. 1st Brigade, 2nd Division, XIX Corps, to July 1864. 1st Brigade, 2nd Division, XIX Corps, Army of the Shenandoah, Middle Military Division, to January 1865. 1st Brigade, Grover's Division, District of Savannah, Georgia, Department of the South, to March 1865. 1st Brigade, 1st Division, X Corps, to May 1865. District of Savannah, Georgia, Department of the South, to August 1865.

The 75th New York Infantry mustered out of service on August 23, 1865.

== Detailed service ==
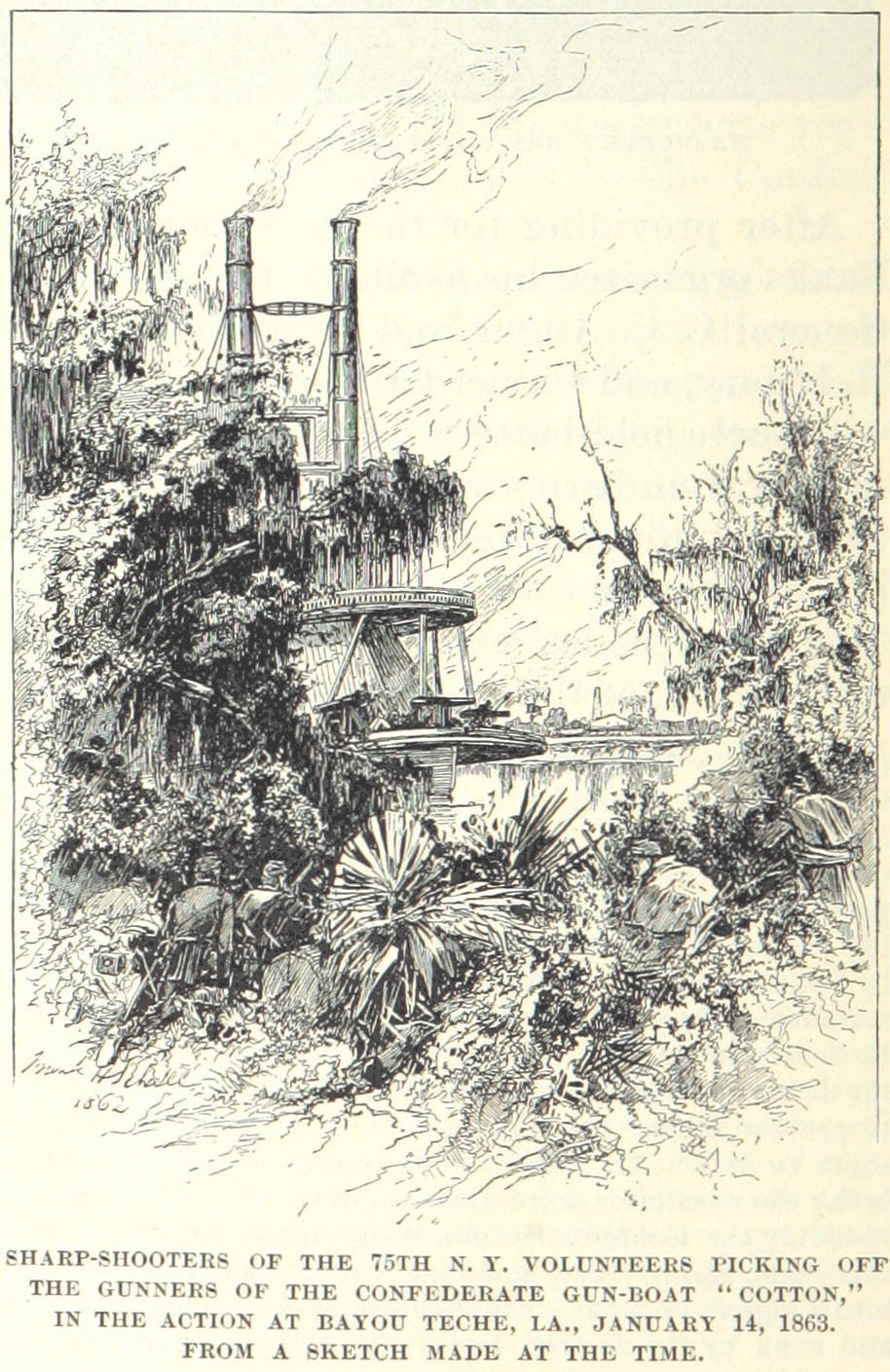
Members of the 75th fire at the Confederate gunboat CSS J. A. Cotton at Bayou Teche

Left New York for Florida December 6, 1861, arriving at Santa Rosa Island, Florida on December 15. Duty there and at Fort Pickens, Fla., until May 1862. Bombardment of Forts McRae and Barrancas, Pensacola Harbor, Fla., January 1, 1862. Occupation of Pensacola, Florida, May 10, and duty there until August. Fair Oaks, Fla., May 28. Moved to New Orleans, La., August, arriving there August 9. Duty at Carrollton until October. Operations in District of LaFourche October 24-November 6. Occupation of Donaldsonville October 25. Action at Georgia Landing, near Labadieville, and at Thibodeauxville October 28. Duty in the District of LaFourche until February 1863. Expedition to Bayou Teche January 12–15. Bayou Teche January 13. Aboard the steamer Cotton January 14. Operations against Port Hudson March 7–27. Duty at Brashear City until April. Operations in western Louisiana April 9-May 14. Expedition from Brashear City to Opelousas April 11–20. Fort Bisland April 12–13. Jeanerette, Irish Bend, April 14. Bayou Vermilion April 17. Opelousas April 20. Expedition to Alexandria and Simsport May 5–18. Boyce's Bridge, Cotile Bayou, May 14 (detachment). Siege of Port Hudson May 25-July 9. Assaults on Port Hudson May 27 and June 14. Surrender of Port Hudson July 9. Donaldsonville, Bayou LaFourche, July 12–13. At Baton Rouge August 1-September 3. Sabine Pass Expedition September 4–11. Sabine Pass September 8. Moved from Algiers to Brashear City September 17. Regiment changed to mounted infantry October. Western Louisiana Campaign October 3-November 30. Vermilion Bayou October 9–10. Near New Iberia November 19. Camp Pratt November 20. Camp Lewis December 3. Regiment veteranized January 1, 1864. Veterans on furlough January to April, then at Washington, D.C., XXII Corps, as infantry, April 2 to May 20; then moved to Department of the Gulf and rejoined the regiment June 28. Non-veterans attached to 14th New York Cavalry until June 28, 1864, participating in the Red River Campaign March 10-May 22. Advance from Franklin to Alexandria March 14–26. Bayou Rapides March 20. Henderson's Hill March 21. Monett's Ferry and Cloutiersville March 29–30. Natchitoches March 31. Crump's Hill April 2. Wilson's Farm April 7. Bayou de Paul, Carroll's Mill, April 8. Pleasant Hill April 9. Natchitoches April 20. About Cloutiersville April 21–22. Monett's Ferry, Cane River Crossing, April 23. Above Alexandria April 28. Hudnot's Plantation May 1. Alexandria May 4–8. Retreat to Morganza May 13–20. Choctaw Bayou May 13–14. Avoyelle's Prairie May 15. Mansura May 16. Yellow Bayou May 17–18. Sailed for Fort Monroe, Va., July 13. Before Richmond July 21–30. Deep Bottom July 27–29. Moved to Washington, D.C., July 31. Sheridan's Shenandoah Valley Campaign August 7-November 28. Halltown August 23–24. Berryville September 3–4. Battle of Winchester September 19. Fisher's Hill September 22. Battle of Cedar Creek October 19. Duty in the Shenandoah Valley until January 1865. Ordered to Savannah, Ga., January 11, 1865, and provost duty there until August.

"It may well be imagined that the privilege of passing the lines and traveling all over the country, enjoyed by the 75th, was calculated to arouse more or less envy. Such was the case, and many soldiers of other organizations pass them selves off as 75ers, and under this pretense got beyond the pickets, committing shameful thefts and outrages in the surrounding country. Thus in time complaints of ill-treatment reached headquarters, and the regiment, undeservedly, received a reprimand... On these occasions, as when capturing horses and saddles, the soldiers pitied those whom they were robbing, satisfying their consciences with the thought that those who had brought on this distressing war were the ones who were to blame for its fruits." -James Jabez Hall

== Casualties ==
The regiment lost a total of 198 men during service; 4 officers and 91 enlisted men killed or mortally wounded, 103 enlisted men died of disease.

== Commanders ==
- Colonel John A. Dodge
- Colonel Robert B. Merritt
- Colonel Robert P. York
- Major Benjamin F. Thurber - commanded at the Battle of Cedar Creek

== See also ==
- List of New York Civil War regiments
- New York in the Civil War

== Sources ==
- Babcock, Willoughby. Selections from the Letters and Diaries of Brevet-Brigadier General Willoughby Babcock of the Seventy-Fifth New York Volunteers: A Study of Camp Life in the Union Armies During the Civil War (Albany, NY: University of the State of New York), 1922.
- Dyer, Frederick H. A Compendium of the War of the Rebellion (Des Moines, IA: Dyer Pub. Co.), 1908.
- Hall, Henry & James Hall. Cayuga in the Field: A Record of the 19th N.Y. Volunteers, All the Batteries of the 3d New York Artillery, and 75th New York Volunteers (Auburn, NY: Truair, Smith & Co., Printers), 1873.
- Raus, Edmund J. Where Duty Called Them: The Story of the Samuel Babcock Family of Homer, New York, in the Civil War (Daleville, VA: Schroeder Publications), 2001. ISBN 1-8892-4649-2

Attribution
