= 4th Massachusetts Battery =

- Active: November 17, 1861 – November 10, 1865
- Country: United States
- Branch: Union Army
- Type: Field artillery
- Size: Battery
- Part of: In 1863: Third Division (Paine), XIX Corps
- Engagements: American Civil War

Commanders
- Current commander: Captain Charles H. Manning

The 4th Massachusetts Battery (or 4th Battery, Massachusetts Light Artillery) was an artillery battery that served in the Union Army during the American Civil War. The unit was sometimes known as "Manning's Battery" after its commanding officer, Capt. Charles H. Manning. It was one of the Massachusetts regiments organized in response to President Abraham Lincoln's call on May 2, 1861 for volunteer troops to serve a term of three-years. The core of the unit was a peace-time militia company known as the Salem Light Artillery. The battery trained at Camp Chase in Lowell, Massachusetts. It was assigned to the Department of the Gulf under Major General Benjamin F. Butler and departed Boston by steamship on November 20.

For the first several months of their service, the battery performed garrison duty at Ship Island off the Mississippi coast, which served as the staging point for Butler's expedition. After proceeding on to Baton Rouge in May 1862, the battery took part in operations in the vicinity of that city, being heavily engaged in the Battle of Baton Rouge on August 5, 1862. In 1863, the battery participated in the Siege of Port Hudson, Louisiana and the Second Bayou Teche Campaign.

In December 1863, nearly all the men of the 4th Massachusetts Light Artillery opted to reenlist (although the close of their term was still roughly a year off) in exchange for a month's furlough. This furlough was taken in March 1864 during which the unit returned to Massachusetts. When the 4th Battery returned to New Orleans in April, they were drilled for several months as infantry, then re-supplied again as light artillery. During September and October 1864, the battery was based in Morganza, Louisiana and took part in several expeditions in that region. For two months at the end of 1864, the unit was based in Memphis, Tennessee. They returned to New Orleans in January 1865 and at the close of the war were involved in the Mobile Campaign in Alabama, taking part in the Battle of Spanish Fort and the Battle of Fort Blakeley.

After the Confederate surrender, the battery was deployed to Buffalo Bayou outside of Houston, Texas where they performed various details over the summer of 1865. On October 1, the unit started the return journey to Massachusetts. After reaching Boston harbor on November 4, the unit was mustered out at Gallop's Island on November 11, 1865.

== See also ==
- Massachusetts in the Civil War
- List of Massachusetts Civil War units
