= Alfred Mouton =

Confederate general of the American Civil War (1829–1864)

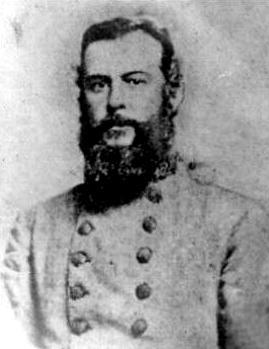
- Born: February 18, 1829; Opelousas, Louisiana
- Died: April 8, 1864 (aged 35); Mansfield, Louisiana
- Education: United States Military Academy
- Spouse: Philomene Mouton
- Military career
- Allegiance: United States (Confederate States of America) Confederate States
- Branch: United States Army; Louisiana State Militia; Confederate States Army
- Service years: 1850 (USA); 1850 - 1861 (Militia); 1861 - 1864 (CSA)
- Rank: Second Lieutenant (USA); Brigadier General (CSA)
- Conflicts: American Civil War; Battle of Shiloh; Battle of Georgia Landing; Red River Campaign; Battle of Mansfield †

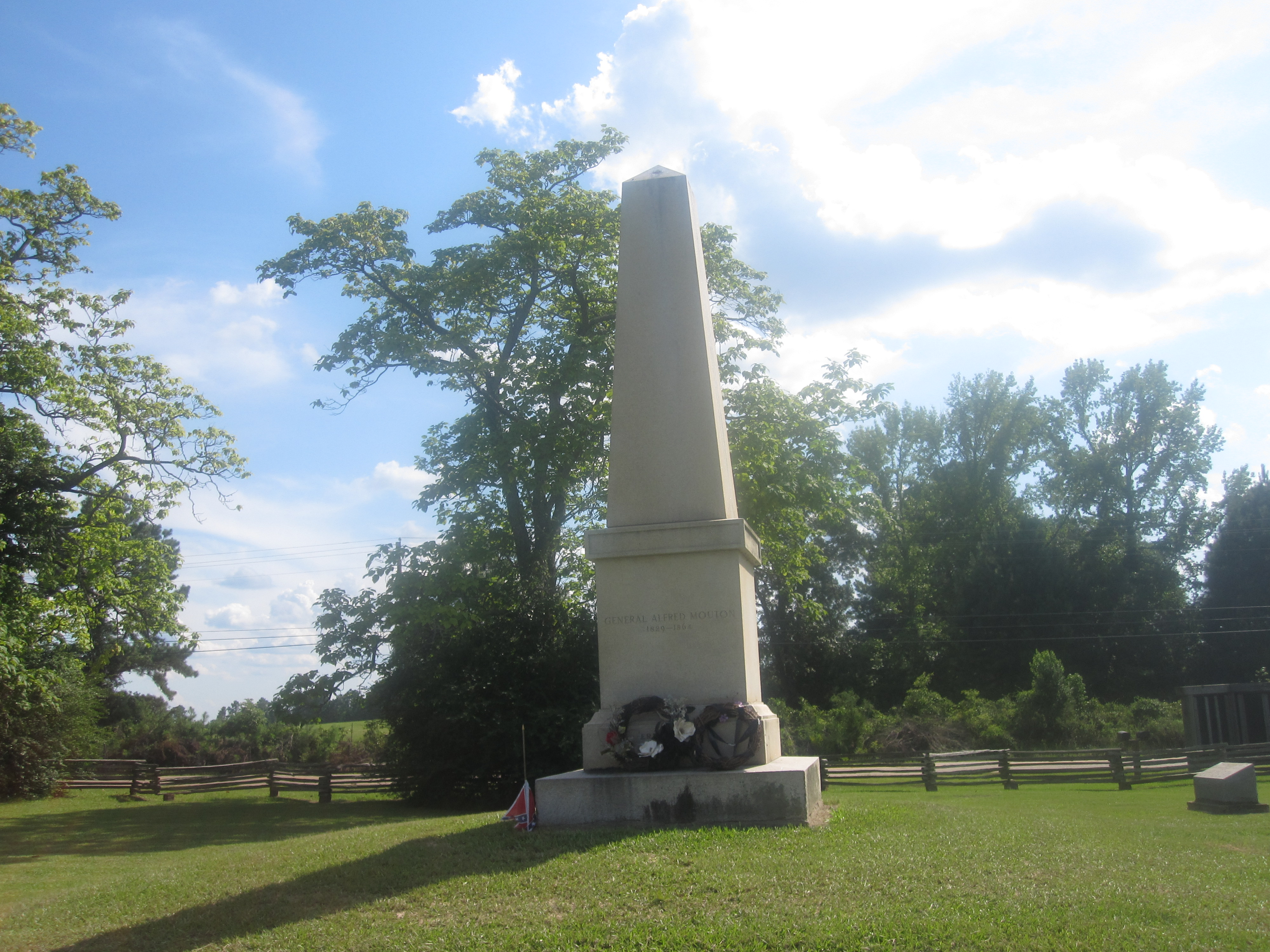
General Alfred Mouton Monument at the Mansfield State Historic Site in Mansfield, Louisiana; the inscription reads: "Here Gen. Mouton fell; here Prince de Polignac sprang to the head of the troops to take the fallen leader's place and bear them to victory." Mouton's grave was later moved to Lafayette, Louisiana.

Jean-Jacques-Alfred-Alexandre "Alfred" Mouton (February 18, 1829 – April 8, 1864) was a Confederate general in the American Civil War. Although trained at West Point, he soon resigned his commission to become a civil engineer and then a sugarcane grower, while also serving as a brigadier general in the Louisiana State Militia.

On the outbreak of the Civil War, he commanded the 18th Louisiana Infantry Regiment, where he proved a strict disciplinarian who was also notably friendly and sociable with the rank and file. Wounded at Shiloh, he was made a brigade commander under General Richard Taylor, with whom he successfully obstructed Union efforts to secure the Bayou Teche region of southern Louisiana. In the Red River Campaign, Mouton was killed at the Battle of Mansfield, while leading his men in a cavalry charge.

== Early life ==
Mouton was born in Opelousas, Louisiana, the son of former Governor of Louisiana Alexandre Mouton. Alfred enrolled in St. Charles College in Grand Coteau, Louisiana. Upon his graduation from St. Charles College, Alexandre Mouton secured for Alfred an appointment to the United States Military Academy in West Point, New York. Alfred was hesitant to go at first because up until that point in his life he had been only around French-speaking people and customs; he knew little English and was not accustomed to speaking it. However, his father was adamant, and he was enrolled in 1846.

At West Point, Mouton was an average student scoring good marks in certain areas, including French, but it was evident that he struggled with the new language he was around. Alfred graduated from West Point on July 1, 1850, 38th out of 44 . He stayed with the United States Army just briefly before resigning his commission that September. As soon as he resigned his commission, Mouton took up a civil engineering position as an assistant engineer for the New Orleans, Opelousas and Great Western Railroad. He held that position from 1852 to 1853. After resigning from the railroad business, Mouton took up farming sugar cane in Lafayette Parish, Louisiana.

While living in Lafayette Parish, Mouton became a prominent member of the community due to his family connections. He served as leader of the Lafayette Vigilante Committee, a local militia company. Among the actions taken by the militia were running free blacks out of the parish for being involved in interracial relationships and whipping free blacks for giving alcohol to slaves. The vigilantes claimed that the victims were promoting a slave revolt.

Alfred also served as brigadier general in the Louisiana State Militia from 1850 to 1861.

At the age of 25, Alfred married his cousin Philomene in Lafayette. Philomene was the daughter of Alfred's uncle Jean Baptiste Mouton.

== Civil War ==
At the outbreak of the Civil War, Mouton organized a company of men from the local population in Lafayette Parish. The company consisted of mostly farmers from around the area. Mouton was elected captain of the company upon its organization. When the company was organized into the 18th Louisiana Infantry Regiment, he was elected colonel. Mouton quickly made a reputation for himself as a strict disciplinarian and an efficient drillmaster. However, after drill he mingled freely with his soldiers in camp, stopping to talk to anyone of the regiment. One of his soldiers had this to say about him: "As a drillmaster, he had few, if any, equals. I have seen him drill the regiment for an hour in a square, the sides of which ware equal to the length of his line of battle, without once throwing a company outside or recalling a command when given. He was a strict disciplinarian and allowed no deviation from orders either by officers or soldiers."

During the weeks before the Battle of Shiloh, the 18th Louisiana was one of the regiments called to the tiny crossroads town of Corinth, Mississippi, for Confederate General Albert Sidney Johnston's planned attack on Union forces encamped near Pittsburg Landing, Tennessee. At Shiloh, the 18th Louisiana was organized into Col. Preston Pond's brigade. It was while serving in this brigade that the regiment and their commander received their baptism by fire. Pond's brigade attacked the Federal right, against the divisions of Union generals William Tecumseh Sherman and John A. McClernand. During one of these attacks, Colonel Mouton was wounded. After this Confederate defeat in April 1862, General P.G.T. Beauregard ordered a withdrawal back to Corinth. After arriving there, the 18th Louisiana was sent back to Louisiana to replenish its depleted ranks.

While back in Louisiana, Mouton was made interim commander of the District of West Louisiana, part of the Trans-Mississippi Department, and did what he could with the limited men and supplies that he had to fight off Federal attempts to move into the state. His army, attempting to protect the sugar cane farms along Bayou Lafourche, was brushed aside by the U.S. Volunteers under Brigadier General Godfrey Weitzel in the Battle of Georgia Landing at Labadieville, Louisiana, in October 1862, which led to Weitzel destroying much of the crops in that area. With the arrival of Confederate Major General Richard Taylor, Mouton was made a brigade commander and given the rank of brigadier general. The duo of Mouton and Taylor would prove to be one of the most efficient during the war and they, along with cavalry commander Thomas Green, would harass, confuse, frustrate, and delay Union attempts to secure the Bayou Teche region of southern Louisiana. Mouton's leadership in his Louisiana brigade helped the Confederates undermine Union attempts to access the rich Bayou Teche region. He was a key participant in the battles of Irish Bend, Fort Bisland, Franklin, and Bayou Borbeau, along with numerous other smaller skirmishes.

Mouton's brigade was used as the lead unit in the Confederate attack at the Battle of Mansfield. While leading his brigade in a charge against the Union position, Mouton was shot and killed. Historian John D. Winters reports on the battle: "On his horse, Mouton made a perfect target, and a Federal marksman dropped him from his saddle. The gallant Polignac now rode forward and took over the command. With tears of grief and rage in their eyes, the yelling men followed Polignac. They ran on through the deadly hail, determined to avenge the death of their leader. ... Mouton's division lost about one third of its total strength." Mouton's death was lamented by General Taylor, who said, "Above all the death of the gallant Mouton affected me ... modest, unselfish, and patriotic. He showed best in action always leading his men." He was first buried on the battlefield but was moved in 1874 to St. John's Cemetery in Lafayette, Louisiana.

Mouton's stepmother was the sister of Confederate General Franklin Gardner.

=== Honors ===
A street in the Lakeview area of New Orleans was named for Mouton. In 2021, the city's Street Renaming Commission identified it as one that should be renamed, saying Mouton was "integral in supporting and promoting the institution of slavery and owned enslaved people."

In 1922, a statue of General Mouton was erected in downtown Lafayette by the United Daughters of the Confederacy as part of its larger efforts to promote the Lost Cause mythology. The city's mayor at the time was future congressman Robert L. Mouton, one of the many Mouton cousins to hold powerful positions in the area over generations. After years of activism led by the organization Move the Mindset, the statue was removed from its prominent downtown street corner on July 17, 2021. The statue has since been relocated to the Confederate museum at Camp Moore.

A street in downtown Lafayette remains named in Mouton's honor, as is a street in Bossier City, near Barksdale Air Force Base. The Brigadier General J. J. Alfred A. Mouton Camp #778 of the Sons of Confederate Veterans, in Opelousas, Louisiana, is also named for him.

== See also ==
- List of American Civil War generals (Confederate)
