= Preston Pond Jr. =

American politician

- Born: September 9, 1823; Hinsdale, New Hampshire
- Died: June 15, 1864 (aged 40)
- Burial place: Old Jackson Cemetery; Jackson, Louisiana
- Military career
- Allegiance: Confederate States
- Branch: Confederate Army
- Service years: 1861–62 (CSA)
- Rank: Colonel (Louisiana Militia); Colonel (CSA)
- Commands: 21st Louisiana Militia Regiment; 16th Louisiana Infantry Regiment; Pond's Brigade
- Conflicts: American Civil War: Battle of Shiloh

Preston Pond Jr. (September 9, 1823 – June 15, 1864) was a lawyer and politician from Louisiana, who served as a colonel in the Confederate States Army during the American Civil War.

== Early life and family ==
Preston Pond was born in Hinsdale, New Hampshire, on September 9, 1823. His parents were Dr. Preston Pond Sr., M.D. and Adeline Stebbins Wright. When he was a child his family moved to Jackson, Louisiana, where his father continued his medical profession. He grew up in a household with his parents, his four siblings and one slave. His three brothers ultimately all served in the Confederate States Army; Henry L. as 1st lieutenant in the 16th Louisiana Infantry and Charles L. as corporal in the 1st Louisiana Cavalry (later joined the 16th Louisiana Infantry and 10th Arkansas Infantry). The youngest, Dana B. Pond, served as private in the 27th Louisiana Infantry till he was captured and paroled at Vicksburg and joined the Ogden Cavalry Battalion.

Pond married Emelie Cooper (b. 1829) in 1846. In 1852 he married again, this time Adelaide Alice Woodward (1835 – December 12, 1878). With Adelaide he had a single child, daughter Adelaide Jane Pond, born on October 22, 1856. Their household was completed by a young Irish immigrant girl, C. O'Shaughnessy.

Leaning to a legal profession by 1850, Pond was admitted to the East Feliciana bar and practiced law in Jackson. By 1860 he had moved to Clinton, Louisiana, and in addition to his practice he took up farming. Entering politics as a Know Nothing he was elected to the Louisiana House of Representatives for East Feliciana in 1851. In 1855 he ran for the U.S. Congress as candidate for Louisiana's 3rd congressional district, but he was defeated by Thomas G. Davidson.

Pond also served in the Louisiana Militia as an officer in the 21st or "Parish East Feliciana" Regiment. By 1849 he attained the rank of major, by 1860 he was the regiment's colonel.

== Early Civil War ==
When the American Civil War erupted and Louisiana seceded, the Militia was organized into five divisions. Pond's 21st Regiment was part of the 3rd Division, and the colonel was, in addition to his regimental duties, named divisional inspector general on April 3, 1861. He traveled with his men to Camp Moore for training and reorganisation. On September 26, 1861, the 16th Louisiana Infantry Regiment was organized and mustered into Confederate service with a strength of 851 officers and men. When the regiment selected its own officers the men elected Pond to become their colonel. He spent the next months training his men, drilled them 5 hours a day and gained a high reputation for his regiment. In November 1861 the 16th Infantry was ordered by General Mansfield Lovell to relocate to Camp Chalmette at Chalmette, Louisiana, to be in proximity to New Orleans. Bad housing, inadequate supply, diseases and rigid camp discipline constantly thinned the ranks.

When Confederate President Jefferson Davis asked Louisiana to provide additional forces for service in Tennessee in February 1862 the 16th Infantry was brigaded with the 17th, 18th and 19th Regiments; under the overall command of Brigadier General Daniel Ruggles. Sent to Corinth, Mississippi, the brigade had to bear equally bad camp conditions as before. When Ruggles was elevated to division command in the Army of Mississippi the brigade was broken up and a new brigade formed as part of Ruggles' division in March. By virtue of seniority Pond now commanded a brigade composed of the 16th (under Maj. Daniel C. Gober), 18th and Crescent Louisiana Regiments as well as the Orleans Guard Battalion, the 38th Tennessee Infantry and an Alabamian artillery battery under Captain William H. Ketchum. By March 6, 1862, the regiment had an effective strength of 330 men.

== Battle of Shiloh ==
In the morning on April 6, 1862, Pond's Brigade formed the extreme left flank of the Confederate line. General Albert Sidney Johnston, commanding the Confederate forces on the field, ordered Pond to seize and hold the bridge over Owl Creek. Around 8:00 A.M., Pond sent the 38th Tennessee Infantry and the Crescent Regiment, supported by a gun section, to secure the bridge while the remaining portion of his brigade joined Ruggles's advance toward McDowell Field. Pond's Brigade successfully repulsed Colonel John McDowell's brigade and occupied the federal camps on the Purdy Road, northwest of Shiloh Church. Sensing the enemy was in full retreat, Ruggles ordered the division to advance through Crescent Field to cut off their retreat. While Pond's Brigade advanced it received several volleys of friendly fire from their right, which caused great confusion and led Pond to retreat several hundred yards and hold until the confederate line reformed. When the attack resumed Pond advanced through Sowell Field, stopping on a ridge in front of Tilghman's Branch of Owl Creek. On the opposite bank Federal forces hastily organized a new defensive line and pounded Pond's position with artillery fire. Around 4:00 p.m., Pond's Brigade was ordered to advance and charge up the opposite ridge to break the Federal line. Pond protested, but finally had to order the brigade to attack. Casualties from enemy rifle and artillery fire as well as repeated friendly fire from the brigade's right-rear disorganized the charge and forced the brigade to fall back from the Branch. Pond reformed his bloodied brigade and remained in position until nightfall; then he ordered his men to send out advanced pickets and sleep on arms. He positioned his brigade less than a mile from the river with his left flank holding Owl Creek. However, during the night the brigades to his right retreated several hundred yards to the rear without notifying Pond of their new position.

Early on April 7, Pond's Brigade was taken under sporadic rifle and artillery fire from enemy skirmishers close to 400 yards away. Realizing that the Confederate main battle line no longer protected his right flank, Pond quickly ordered his brigade to retreat and reform in accordance to the main line at the south end of Jones Field. General Ruggles ordered Pond's Brigade to take its on the left like the day before. However, General Hardee ordered Pond to move his brigade in support of the extreme right of his battle line. After moving the brigade from the extreme left flank to its right flank, General P.G.T. Beauregard rode up and ordered Pond to advance against the Federal troops in a different location. However, before Pond could completely reposition the brigade, General Leonidas Polk ordered Pond to move the brigade to support his battle line. While moving the brigade, Beauregard again redirected Pond's Brigade and ordered them to return immediately to Army headquarters near Shiloh Church. Upon reaching the church Pond's Brigade and other hastily assembled units formed a rear guard to allow the army to retreat toward Corinth. In his report Pond reported that his brigade had total casualties of 597 men; 90 of them from his own 16th Louisiana.

== Later life ==
Under the new Conscription Act of April 1862, the 16th Infantry had to reorganize and reelect its officers. In the end Pond was not re-elected as colonel, and he resigned his commission on May 8, 1862. Returning to his home in Clinton restarted farming and reopened his legal business. Simultaneously he also reentered politics, becoming a Louisiana State Senator for East Feliciana. In August 1863 Pond, as voice of Clinton's citizens, wrote a letter to the federal department commander condemning a speculated raid by irregular Union forces in the vicinity of Port Hudson. While the federal commander, General Nathaniel P. Banks, acknowledged the receipt of the letter and stated that no such raid was planned, he also made clear that the opinion of the citizenship of the rebellious state would be of no matter in this question. When on January 25, 1864, one of Pond's fellow officers, Brigadier General Henry Watkins Allen, became Governor of Louisiana Pond was appointed to his aides. On May 8 Pond wrote a letter to the Governor, condemning the actions of several regular and irregular confederate officers, who were accused of violent and criminal behaviour.

Pond died on June 15, 1864, and is buried in Old Jackson Cemetery in Jackson, Louisiana.
