= Jones S. Hamilton =

American politician (1833–1907)

Jones Stewart Hamilton
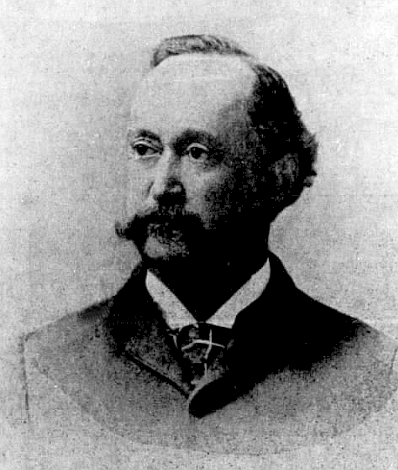

Mississippi State Senator
- In office 1884–1888

Personal details
- Born: April 19, 1833 Wilkinson County, Mississippi, U.S.
- Died: January 21, 1907 (aged 73) Jackson, Mississippi, U.S.
- Spouse(s): Caroline Augusta Stewart; Fannie Buck
- Relations: Duncan Stewart (maternal grandfather)
- Children: 5 sons, 2 daughters
- Parent(s): William Hamilton; Eliza Stewart
- Education: Centenary College of Louisiana at Jackson
- Occupation: Businessman
- Military career
- Allegiance: Confederate States of America (1861–1865)
- Branch: Confederate States Army
- Service years: 1861–1865
- Rank: Lieutenant Colonel
- Units: 16th Mississippi Infantry; Powers' Cavalry Regiment

Jones Stewart Hamilton (April 19, 1833 – January 21, 1907) was an American sheriff, state senator, businessman and Confederate veteran who became a millionaire through investments in railroads run by convicts he leased after the war. His mansion is the namesake of Belhaven University.

== Early life ==
Jones S. Hamilton was born on April 19, 1833, in Wilkinson County, Mississippi. His parents were William Hamilton and Eliza Stewart (the daughter of Lieutenant Governor Duncan Stewart), and he was of Scottish descent. He graduated from Centenary College in Jackson, Louisiana.

== Career ==
Hamilton began his career as the sheriff of Wilkinson County from 1854 to 1858. During the American Civil War he served in Virginia in the 16th Mississippi Infantry as a lieutenant. In 1862 he was appointed Adjutant general of the Mississippi State Troops, and later rejoined active service as a soldier in Powers' Cavalry Regiment.

Hamilton made money through convict leasing after the war. According to the Arkansas Gazette, "As lessee of state penitentiary for years he was identified with many public works." He "owned the Jackson gas works, a race track, and a number of hotels." He was also a publisher of The Clarion Ledger in 1865–1867, and a co-founder of the Gulf and Ship Island Railroad in the early 1880s. He became a millionaire through his investments in railroads, which were run by the convicts he leased. As a result, he has been described as a "southern-style robber baron."

Hamilton was criticized for his use of convict leasing by Roderick Gambrell, a newspaper editor. On May 5, 1887, the two men fought it out in a duel by gunfire, leading to Gambrell's death. Even though duels were illegal in Mississippi, Hamilton was declared "not guilty" on April 9, 1888. Hamilton published a 19-page personal pamphlet ("Jackson, Miss., April 27, 1888.") listing telegrams and letters he received from his multiple supporters, as well as, reprints of newspaper articles about his acquittal.[10][11]

Hamilton served as a member of the Mississippi State Senate, representing Hinds County from 1884 to 1888.

== Personal life, death and legacy ==
Hamilton married Caroline Augusta Stewart in 1856 and they had a son and a daughter. His wife died in 1861. He married his second wife, Fannie Buck, in 1877; they had four sons and a daughter.

Hamilton died on January 21, 1907, in Jackson, Mississippi. He donated his Jackson mansion, Belhaven, to Belhaven College (now known as Belhaven University); the mansion burnt down in 1895 but the university retains its name. By extension, it is also the namesake of the Belhaven Neighborhood where it was located.
