= 57th Massachusetts Infantry Regiment =

57th Regiment Massachusetts Volunteer Infantry
- Active: April 6, 1864 – July 30, 1865
- Country: United States
- Allegiance: Union
- Branch: Union Army
- Type: Infantry
- Size: 1,052
- Part of: In 1864: 1st Brigade, 1st Division, IX Corps

Commanders
- 1st: Colonel William F. Bartlett
- 2nd: Lieutenant Colonel Charles L. Chandler
- 3rd: Captain Julius M. Tucker

Insignia
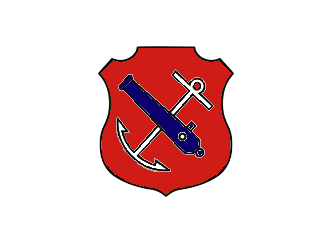
- IX Corps (1st Division) badge

The 57th Regiment Massachusetts Volunteer Infantry was a regiment of infantry that served in the Union Army during the American Civil War. It was one of the four "Veteran Regiments" raised in Massachusetts during the winter of 1863–64. Recruits of these regiments were required to have served at least nine months in a prior unit. Colonel William F. Bartlett, at age 24 already a veteran of three regiments, organized the recruiting and formation of the 57th Massachusetts and served as its first commanding officer.

The regiment was attached to the IX Corps of the Army of the Potomac and took part in Lieutenant General Ulysses S. Grant's Overland Campaign in the spring of 1864. They were in extremely heavy combat during the campaign, suffering great casualties during battles which included the Battle of the Wilderness, Spotsylvania Courthouse, and the Battle of the Crater. They were involved in several assaults during the Siege of Petersburg in 1864 and participated in the spring 1865 battles which finally drove General Robert E. Lee's Confederate Army from their entrenchments in Petersburg, leading to the end of the war at Appomattox Courthouse. At the war's close, they participated in the Grand Review of the Armies

== Formation and early duty ==
Colonel Bartlett began recruiting 57th Massachusetts in the summer of 1863. The recruits came from the western part of the state. The rendezvous and camp of instruction was Camp Wool in Worcester, Massachusetts. Bartlett, a veteran of the 4th Battalion Massachusetts Infantry, the 20th Massachusetts Infantry, and the 49th Massachusetts Infantry was already considered a war hero. At age 20, he set aside his studies at Harvard College to enlist as a private. After serving his 90-day term, Bartlett became a captain in the 20th Massachusetts. He was shot in the knee during the Siege of Yorktown—a wound which required the amputation of his leg. In the summer of 1862, he returned to Massachusetts to recuperate, finish his studies at Harvard, and then organized and commanded the 49th Massachusetts. Leading that regiment in the field during the Siege of Port Hudson, Louisiana, Bartlett was again wounded. The wound badly shattered his arm and wrist and effectively removed him from command. After a very short period of recovery, he began recruiting the 57th Massachusetts. He was commissioned as its colonel on August 17, 1863.

Recruiting of veterans progressed slowly but through Col. Bartlett's efforts, the regiment numbered a full ten companies by the spring of 1864 and was mustered into federal service on April 6. The regiment departed Massachusetts on April 18 for Annapolis, Maryland where Major General Ambrose Burnside was reorganizing his IX Corps for the spring campaign. The 57th Massachusetts became part of the 1st Brigade (commanded by Col. Sumner Carruth) of the 1st Division (commanded by Brigadier General Thomas G. Stevenson) of Burnside's IX Corps. The Corps remained at Annapolis until April 23 when they were ordered to march for Washington, D.C. From there they passed on to Arlington and eventually joined the Army of Potomac in its winter quarters surrounding Bealton Station, Virginia along the Orange and Alexandria Railroad. The regiment arrived on May 3 just as the army was leaving camp, commencing the Overland Campaign. The 57th Massachusetts bivouacked one night and then joined the forward movement with the rest of the IX Corps. The Army of the Potomac crossed the Rapidan River and the Overland Campaign commenced.

== See also ==
- Massachusetts in the Civil War
- List of Massachusetts Civil War units
