= Felecia =

Felecia is a feminine given name. Notable people with the given name Felecia include:

- Felecia Angelle (born 1986), American voice actress
- Felecia M. Bell (born 1960), American actress
- Felecia Lindsey-Howse, member of the American hip-hop collective Mo Thugs
- Felecia M. Nave, American chemical engineer and academic administrator
- Felecia Rotellini, chairwoman of the Arizona Democratic Party
- Felecia Williams, American child murder victim

== See also ==
- Felicia
