= William Francis Bartlett =

Union Army general (1840–1876)

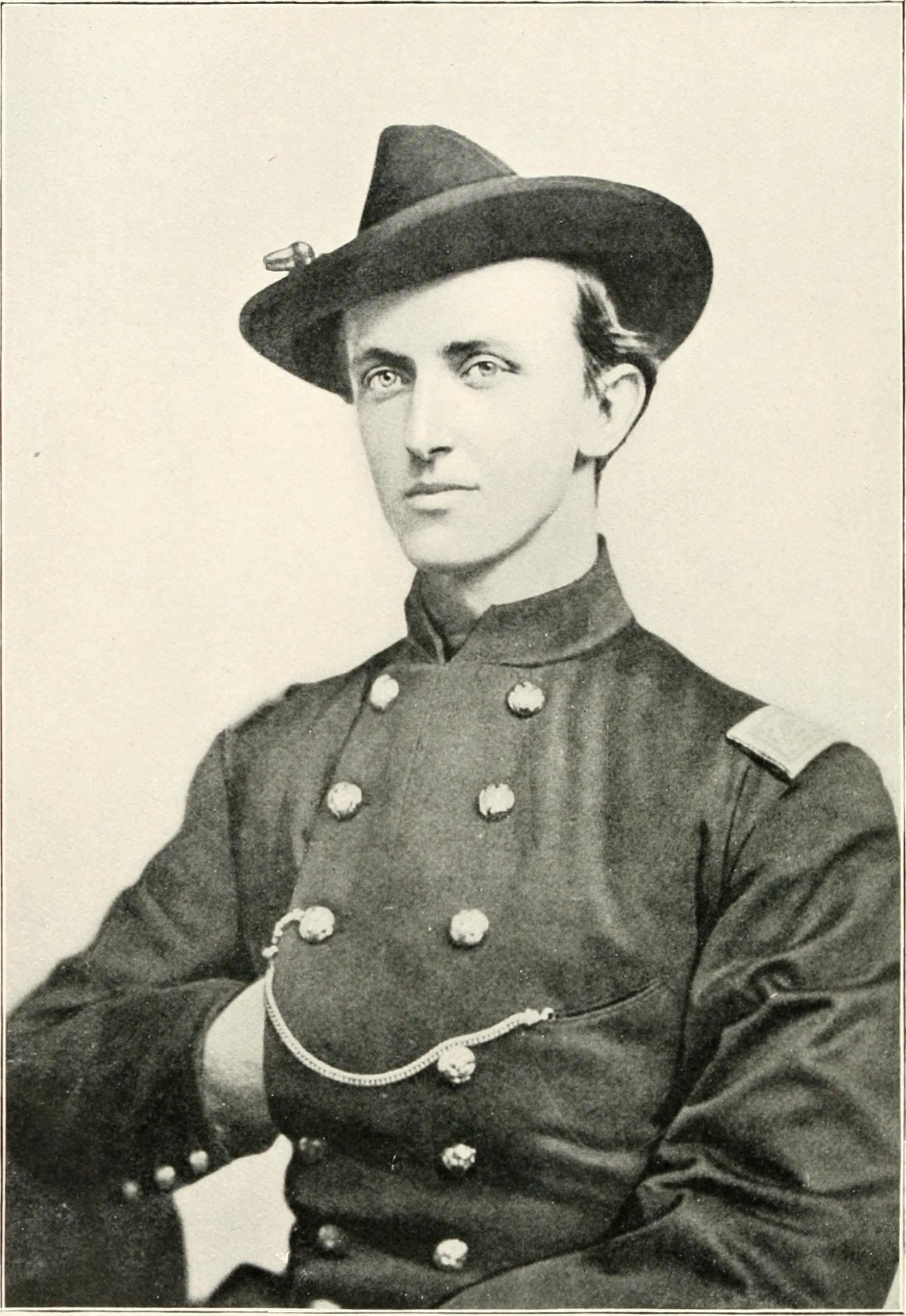
- Born: June 6, 1840; Haverhill, Massachusetts
- Died: December 17, 1876 (aged 36); Pittsfield, Massachusetts
- Burial place: Pittsfield Cemetery, Pittsfield, Massachusetts
- Military career
- Allegiance: United States of America; Union
- Branch: United States Army; Union Army
- Service years: 1861–1866
- Rank: Brigadier General; Brevet Major General
- Units: 4th Massachusetts Infantry Battalion; 20th Massachusetts Infantry
- Commands: 49th Massachusetts Infantry; 57th Massachusetts Infantry; 1st Brigade, 1st Division (Ledlie's), IX Corps; 1st Division, IX Corps
- Conflicts: American Civil War; Battle of Ball's Bluff; Battle of Yorktown (WIA); Battle of Plains Store; Siege of Port Hudson (WIA); Battle of the Wilderness (WIA); Battle of the Crater (POW)
- Other work: Manager, Tredegar Iron Works

Signature
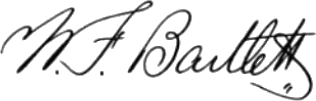

William Francis Bartlett (June 6, 1840 – December 17, 1876) was a general in the Union Army during the American Civil War and, later, an executive in the iron industry.

Bartlett enlisted as a private to serve in the Civil War, leaving in the midst of his studies at Harvard College. By the end of the war, he had risen to the grade of brigadier general, U.S. Volunteers and was awarded the honorary grade of brevet major general, U.S. Volunteers. He successively commanded two regiments, a brigade and a division. Over the course of the war, he was wounded four times.

At the close of the war, Bartlett became the manager of several iron works, most notably the Tredegar Iron Works in Richmond, Virginia.

== Early life ==
Bartlett, the son of Charles Leonard Bartlett and his wife Harriett Dorothy Plummer, was born in Haverhill, Massachusetts, attended Phillips Academy in Andover, Massachusetts and entered Harvard College in 1858. The Civil War began during his junior year and, almost immediately after hearing of the surrender of Fort Sumter, Bartlett enlisted as a private with the Massachusetts Volunteer Militia.

== Civil War service ==
Bartlett initially enlisted in the 4th Battalion Massachusetts Infantry, also known as the New England Guards, which was garrisoned to defend Fort Independence in Boston Harbor. At the time, the three forts in Boston were entirely unmanned and Boston harbor almost defenseless. Fort Independence was the only of the three forts equipped with cannon, however most of them were facing the city and not the water. The 4th Battalion, including Pvt. Bartlett, had much work to do to put Fort Independence in order. Bartlett served with the battalion for the unit's full 90-day term, from April to June 1861.

=== 20th Massachusetts ===
On August 8, 1861, Bartlett was commissioned captain in a new regiment then forming—the 20th Massachusetts Infantry—and given command of Company I. It was known as the "Harvard Regiment" because many of its young officers, including Bartlett, were Harvard students or recent graduates. Shortly after arriving in Virginia in September 1861, Capt. Bartlett led his company into battle for the first time when the 20th Massachusetts took part in the Battle of Ball's Bluff on October 21, 1861. The engagement was a great defeat for the Union Army.

Hoping to avoid any further such defeats, Major General George B. McClellan, the commander of the Army of the Potomac, to which the 20th Massachusetts was attached, developed a plan to by-pass the difficult overland route to the Confederate capital of Richmond. The Peninsular Campaign was intended to be a rapid movement of the Army of the Potomac by water, then by land, up the relatively short Virginia Peninsula. The 20th Massachusetts and Capt. Bartlett were part of this massive movement in the spring of 1862. The campaign stalled, however, when McClellan chose to lay siege to Yorktown, Virginia rather than assaulting the far smaller Confederate force there. During the siege, on April 24, 1862, Capt. Bartlett was shot in the left knee by Confederate pickets. The wound required the amputation of his leg. Bartlett returned to Boston to recuperate and, during the summer of 1862, finished his degree at Harvard.

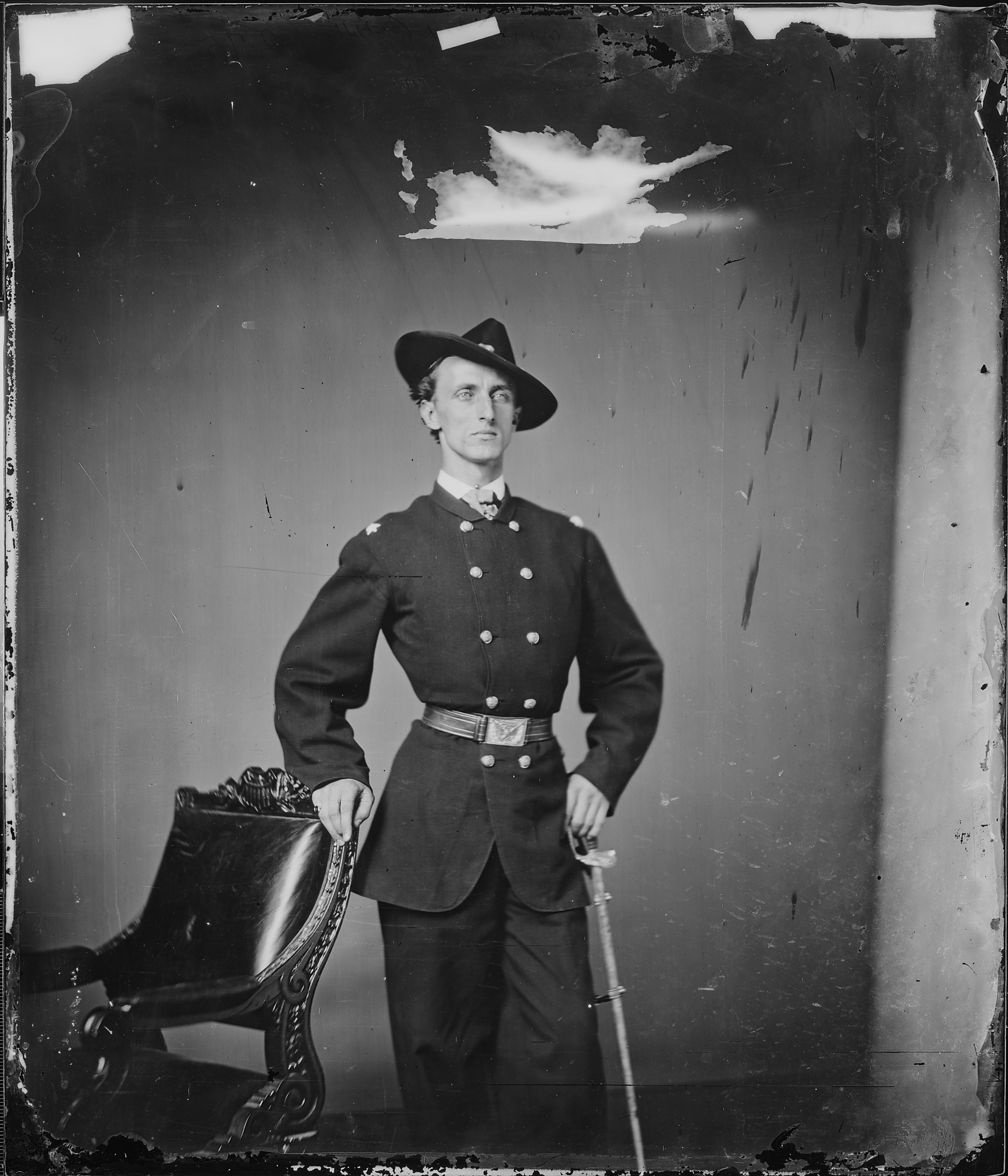
William Francis Bartlett

=== 49th Massachusetts ===
After completing his degree, Bartlett chose not to re-join the 20th Massachusetts and resigned his commission on November 12, 1862. Instead, Bartlett accepted a colonel's commission and was placed in charge of forming a new regiment in Berkshire County, Massachusetts—the 49th Massachusetts Infantry. The regiment was to serve a term of nine months.

The 49th Massachusetts was assigned in late November 1862 to the Louisiana expedition of Maj. Gen. Nathaniel P. Banks. The aim of the expedition was to increase the number of Union soldiers in the Army Department of the Gulf and to conquer the few remaining Confederate strongholds on the Mississippi River, thus opening that waterway to the Union. Bartlett led his regiment during the Siege of Port Hudson in Louisiana in the spring of 1863. Due to the amputation of his leg, he was required to remain on horseback during battle, making him an easy target for Confederates. During one of several assaults on Port Hudson on May 27, 1863, Bartlett was shot twice— a bullet shattered his left wrist, while buckshot struck his right leg. The regimental surgeon, Dr. Frederick Winsor, was able to remove the bullet and save his hand, but the wounds effectively removed him from command until the end of the 49th's term of service in September 1863. Bartlett resigned his commission on September 1, 1863.

=== 57th Massachusetts ===
While still recuperating from his wounds received in Louisiana, Bartlett began to organize, in the fall of 1863, another regiment. This unit, the 57th Massachusetts Infantry was one of four "Veteran Regiments," organized in Massachusetts to consist almost exclusively of men who had already served out an enlistment with a previous regiment. Bartlett was placed in command of the 57th which was formed in Worcester, Massachusetts. The unit was sent to Virginia before it was fully organized, and Bartlett would not receive his new commission as colonel of the 57th until April 9, 1864, although the commission was made retroactive to August 1863.

The 57th Massachusetts became part of the IX Corps of the Army of the Potomac and arrived at the front in time for Ulysses S. Grant's Overland Campaign; a relentless series of attacks by Union forces during the spring of 1864 aimed at grinding down Robert E. Lee's Army of Northern Virginia. Early in the campaign, Bartlett was again wounded, this time in the head, during the Battle of the Wilderness on May 6, 1864. He returned to Massachusetts and, while recovering, received a promotion to brigadier general, U.S. Volunteers, on June 22, 1864, to rank from June 20, 1864. Bartlett returned to the Army of the Potomac in July 1864.

=== Brigade command ===
Upon his return, Bartlett was placed in command of a brigade (1st brigade, 1st division of the IX Corps) consisting almost entirely of Massachusetts regiments. During July, he played a small role in the planning of the Battle of the Crater. This was a bold attempt to break the Siege of Petersburg by digging a mine beneath Confederate entrenchments and detonating a massive amount of gunpowder to create a gap through which Union forces could assault the city. The detonation on July 30, 1864, was successful, but the Union assault was disorganized and failed. Brig. Gen. James H. Ledlie's division, of which Bartlett's brigade was a large part, led the attack. In the battle, Bartlett's prosthetic leg was shot away. Unable to retreat with the rest of his men, Bartlett was captured by Confederates.

Bartlett spent two months in Libby Prison where he grew severely ill. He was eventually released through a prisoner exchange at the end of September 1864, however it was several months before he recovered from his illness.

=== Division command ===
In June 1865, Bartlett returned to the army two months after the Confederate surrender. Although hostilities had ended, a large portion of the Union Army still remained on active duty and Bartlett was promoted to the command of the 1st Division of the IX Corps on June 17, 1865. On January 13, 1866, President Andrew Johnson nominated Bartlett for the award of the honorary grade of brevet major general, U.S. Volunteers, to rank from March 13, 1865, and on March 12, 1866, the U.S. Senate confirmed the award. In July 1865, the IX Corps was disbanded, however Bartlett remained in the army another year until his resignation on July 18, 1866.

== Post-war career ==
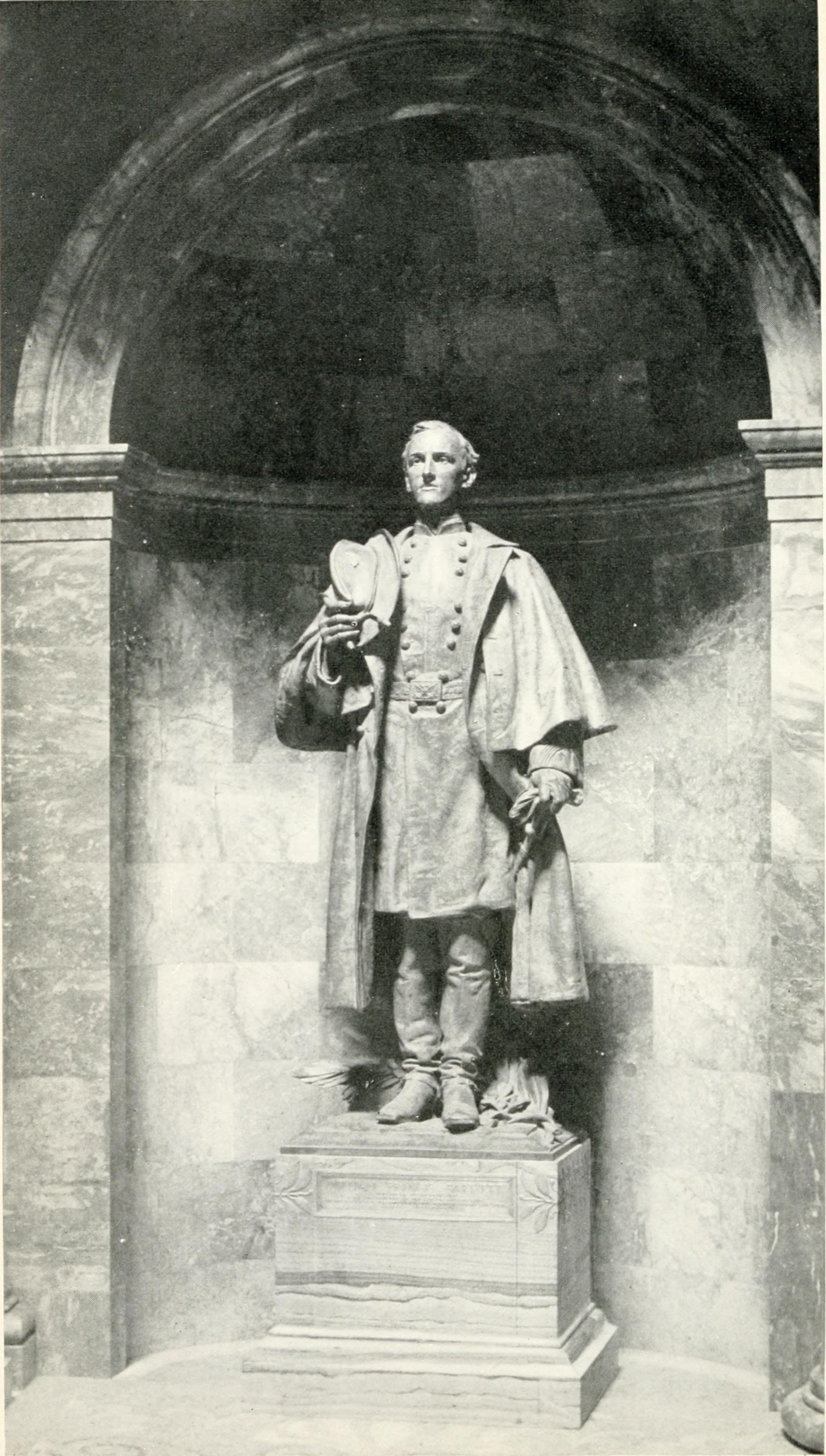
Statue of William Francis Bartlett at the Massachusetts State House

After the war, Bartlett sought employment as a manager of industrial manufacturing. He became the manager of Tredegar Iron Works in Richmond, Virginia, the Pomeroy Iron Works and the Powhatan Iron Company. He eventually settled in Pittsfield, Massachusetts where he died from tuberculosis in December 1876.

In 1904, a statue of William Francis Bartlett was dedicated in the Massachusetts State House.

== See also ==
- List of American Civil War generals (Union)
- List of Massachusetts generals in the American Civil War
- Massachusetts in the American Civil War
