= Thelma Farr Baxter =

American politician, schoolteacher, and business owner (1912–1996)

Member of the Mississippi House of Representatives
- In office 1950 – January 3, 1956

Personal details
- Born: Thelma Williams; October 27, 1912 Prentiss, Mississippi, U.S.
- Died: August 12, 1996 (aged 83) Prentiss, Mississippi, U.S.
- Party: Democratic
- Spouses: Paul Farr (m. 1934; died 1950) James E. Baxter (m. 1952; died 1996)
- Children: 2
- Education: Belhaven College (BS)

Thelma Williams Farr Baxter (née Williams; October 27, 1912 – August 12, 1996) was an American politician, schoolteacher, and business owner who served in the Mississippi House of Representatives from 1950 to 1956. A member of the Democratic Party, she was first elected after running unopposed to fill the seat vacated by her late husband, Paul Farr, who had died in a car accident. She ran for re-election the following year against four primary opponents; after no candidate received a majority of the vote, a runoff election was held, which Farr won. After leaving office in 1956, she continued to teach English and managed a family business.

== Early life and education ==
Thelma Williams was born on October 27, 1912, in Prentiss, Mississippi. She was the daughter of Hiram G. Williams, a physician, and Dora Calhoun. She graduated summa cum laude from Belhaven College in 1934, obtaining the Bachelor of Science degree in dramatics and a certificate in expression. Williams married Paul Farr, an incoming student at the University of Mississippi School of Law, on September 12, 1934, and they had two children, Betty and Paul Jr. In addition to her occupation as an English teacher, she was active in local and statewide organizations, including as secretary of religious education in the Woman's Auxiliary of the Meridian Presbytery and disaster chairman of the Jefferson Davis County Red Cross. On May 3, 1950, Paul, who was in the middle of his second term in the Mississippi House of Representatives, died from injuries he sustained when his car hit a cow on the highway.

== State representative (1950–1956) ==
A special election was held to fill the House seat vacated by Paul. Thelma announced her candidacy in October 1950. She ran unopposed and was elected the following month. Farr ran for re-election in 1951, and faced four primary opponents: R. D. Dyess, a Mississippi justice of the peace; C. E. Manton, a farmer who unsuccessfully ran against Paul Farr in 1947; Z. P. Polk, a farmer; and Joseph Dale, an attorney. Dale led the first primary with 1,206 votes, with 1,146 for Farr, 595 for Manton, 400 for Polk, and 257 for Dyess. Because no candidate received a majority of the vote, a runoff election was held between Farr and Dale, the top two candidates. Farr won the runoff with 55.6 percent of the vote, receiving 373 more votes than Dale.

Farr introduced a bill in February 1952 to keep animals off the roads by requiring livestock to be contained in an enclosure and enacting penalties for owners of animals on the loose. The bill was co-sponsored by 48 other representatives, but drew backlash from southern Mississippi lobbyists and was not brought for a full vote after referral to two House committees. The bill was eventually passed in 1956, shortly after Farr left office. During her time in the House, Farr also introduced a bill to reform the State Oil and Gas Board. She was chosen as the secretary of the state Democratic convention in June 1952.

Farr married fellow state representative James E. Baxter in October 1952 in Laurel, Mississippi. Farr and Baxter had been deskmates in the Mississippi legislature and had begun dating around the end of the legislative session that year. They became the second married couple in the Mississippi House, along with Orene and John Farese.

Thelma Baxter was succeeded as state representative by Z. P. Polk on January 3, 1956.

== Later life and death ==
After leaving the Mississippi legislature, Baxter taught 11th- and 12th-grade English at the new Prentiss Consolidated School. She later managed a family business for 20 years.

Baxter died of heart failure at Jefferson Davis County Hospital in Prentiss on August 12, 1996. She was 83 years old.

== See also ==
- Widow's succession
