= David P. Casey =

Medal of Honor recipient

- Born: 1842; Ireland
- Died: January 4, 1893 (aged 50–51); Whitinsville, Massachusetts
- Burial place: Saint Patrick's Cemetery, Northbridge, Massachusetts
- Military career
- Allegiance: United States of America
- Branch: United States Army; Union Army
- Service years: 1861–1865
- Rank: Corporal
- Unit: 25th Regiment Massachusetts Volunteer Infantry - Company C
- Conflicts: Battle of Cold Harbor
- Awards: Medal of Honor

David P. Casey (1842 – January 4, 1893) was an Irish soldier who fought in the American Civil War. Casey received the United States' highest award for bravery during combat, the Medal of Honor, for his action during the Battle of Cold Harbor in Virginia on 3 June 1864. He was honored with the award on 14 September 1888.

== Biography ==
Casey was born in Ireland in 1842. He joined the Army from Northbridge, Massachusetts in October 1861, and mustered out with his regiment in July 1865. Casey died on 4 January 1893, and his remains are interred at Saint Patrick's Cemetery in Northbridge.

== Medal of Honor citation ==
Two color bearers having been shot dead one after the other, the last one far in advance of his regiment and close to the enemy's line, this soldier rushed forward, and, under a galling fire, after removing the dead body of the bearer therefrom, secured the flag and returned with it to the Union lines.

== See also ==
- List of American Civil War Medal of Honor recipients: A–F
