= Belhaven University =

Christian university in Jackson, Mississippi, US

Coordinates: 32.319829°N 90.169392°W

- Former names: Mississippi Synodical College (1883–1939); Belhaven College for Young Ladies (1894–1911); Belhaven Collegiate and Industrial Institute (1911–1915); Belhaven College (1915–2010)
- Motto: Non Ministari Sed Ministare (Latin)
- Motto in English: Not To Be Served But To Serve
- Type: Private university
- Established: 1883; 143 years ago
- Religious affiliation: Presbyterian
- Academic affiliations: CCCU; NAICU; APCU
- President: Roger Parrott
- Students: 3,600 (campus and online)
- Location: Jackson, Mississippi, United States
- Campus: 42 acres (17 ha)
- Colors: Green and Gold
- Nickname: Blazers
- Sporting affiliations: NCAA Division III
- Website: belhaven.edu

Belhaven University (Belhaven or BU) is a private evangelical Christian university in Jackson, Mississippi, United States. Founded in 1883, the university offers traditional majors, programs of general studies, and pre-professional programs in Christian ministry, medicine, dentistry, law, and nursing.

== History ==
In 1894, the college opened under the name "Belhaven College for Young Ladies" at its current location in Jackson, Mississippi on Peachtree Street in the historic Belhaven Neighborhood.

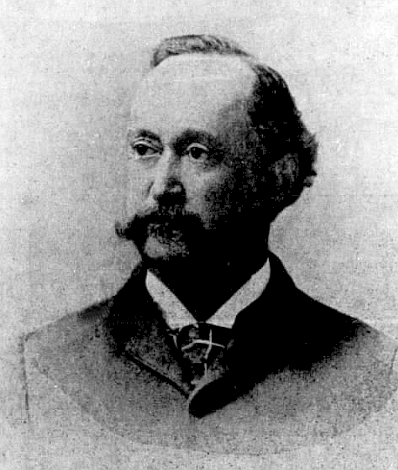
Confederate veteran, businessman, and state senator Jones S. Hamilton, whose mansion housed the school and gave it its Belhaven University name

The school opened in the residence of Colonel Jones S. Hamilton, a Confederate veteran who became a millionaire after the war through investments in railroads run by convicts he leased. The school took the name Belhaven in honor of Hamilton's mansion, which was named after his ancestral home in Scotland.

It was established in 1883 from the merger of Mississippi Synodical College and McComb Female Institute. Dr. Lewis Fitzhugh was president.

J. R. Preston acquired the school and served as its president until it was destroyed by a fire in 1910. He went on to serve as superintendent of schools in Mississippi.

In 1921, Guy T. Gillespie of Lexington, Mississippi, began a 33-year presidency during which Belhaven was first accredited, an endowment fund begun, and scholarships made available. In 1939, Belhaven was merged with the Mississippi Synodical College, a college in Holly Springs, Mississippi that opened in 1883. This date was adopted by the board of trustees as the official founding date of Belhaven as it represented the oldest founding date of all of the institutions which were eventually absorbed into the college.

A major fire devastated the college on August 9, 1927, when lightning struck the school's only building. The columns that stand in the middle of campus are the approximate site of the fire. Today, Fitzhugh and Preston Halls are the remnants of the main building destroyed in the fire.

In 1954, the board of trustees voted to allow the enrollment of male students, making Belhaven a fully co-educational institution. The school added men's basketball and men's tennis as intercollegiate sports in 1956. McFerran Crowe succeeded Gillespie as president and over the next six years he expanded and upgraded the faculty, while also reorganizing and modernizing business operations. The first singing Christmas tree in the world debuted at Belhaven in 1933.

From 1960 to 1961, Robert F. Cooper served as acting president until the board selected Howard J. Cleland, then principal of nearby Murrah High School, to replace him. Under Cleland's 17-year tenure, an ambitious expansion program resulted in six major new buildings, while enrollment and the college budget tripled. In 1965, a faculty member was dismissed for being gay. In 1972, the Synod of Mississippi officially transferred ownership of the college to the board of trustees, making Belhaven a fully independent college. In March, 1978, Doctor Verne R. Kennedy became the first Belhaven alumnus to serve as the chief executive of Belhaven College. In his eight years as president he reaffirmed the commitment to Christian service and the covenant relationship with the Presbyterian Church, and installed a more efficient administrative structure. In June 1986, another alumnus of Belhaven, Newton Wilson, became president. His nine-year term saw the greatest growth in the history of the college, from just over 600 students to more than 1,100.

Verne R. Kennedy followed as president, and was the first Belhaven alumnus to serve as the school's chief officer. Kennedy reaffirmed the college's commitment to Christian service and its relationship with various Presbyterian denominations. Under Kennedy, Belhaven joined the Council for Christian Colleges and Universities.

By 1995, over 80 percent of Belhaven's faculty held doctoral or equivalent degrees. Daniel C. Fredericks served as acting president in 1995. In January 1996, Doctor Roger Parrott became the tenth president of the college, with about 1,300 enrolled students. Under his leadership, Belhaven has added seven major buildings, a variety of new undergraduate academic majors and graduate programs, intercollegiate football, campuses in Memphis, Orlando, Houston, Chattanooga, and Atlanta, online programs, the "Christian Worldview Curriculum", and earned national accreditation in all four of the major arts (Music, Theater, Visual Arts, and Dance). The size of the student body has nearly quadrupled during his tenure.

The school maintains a close church connection. Many faculty and staff members are drawn from various Presbyterian denominations, primarily the Presbyterian Church (U.S.A.), the Presbyterian Church in America, and the Evangelical Presbyterian Church. The college receives both financial support and students from these three denominations as well.

=== Name changes ===
Four major name changes have taken place, although the name "Belhaven" has been common to them all. The school was founded as "Belhaven College for Young Ladies" in 1894. After the original location burned in a fire in 1910, Belhaven was reopened as the "Belhaven Collegiate and Industrial Institute" in 1911 at its current location on Peachtree Street in the historic Belhaven Neighborhood in Jackson. In 1915, the board of trustees further changed the school's name to "Belhaven College".

In December 2009, President Roger Parrott announced that the board of trustees had voted unanimously to change the name from Belhaven College to the current name of Belhaven University, effective January 1, 2010. Among the reasons cited for the name change were the addition of several new graduate programs of study and a total enrollment of more than 3,000 students across four locations, including over 500 graduate students.

== Academics ==
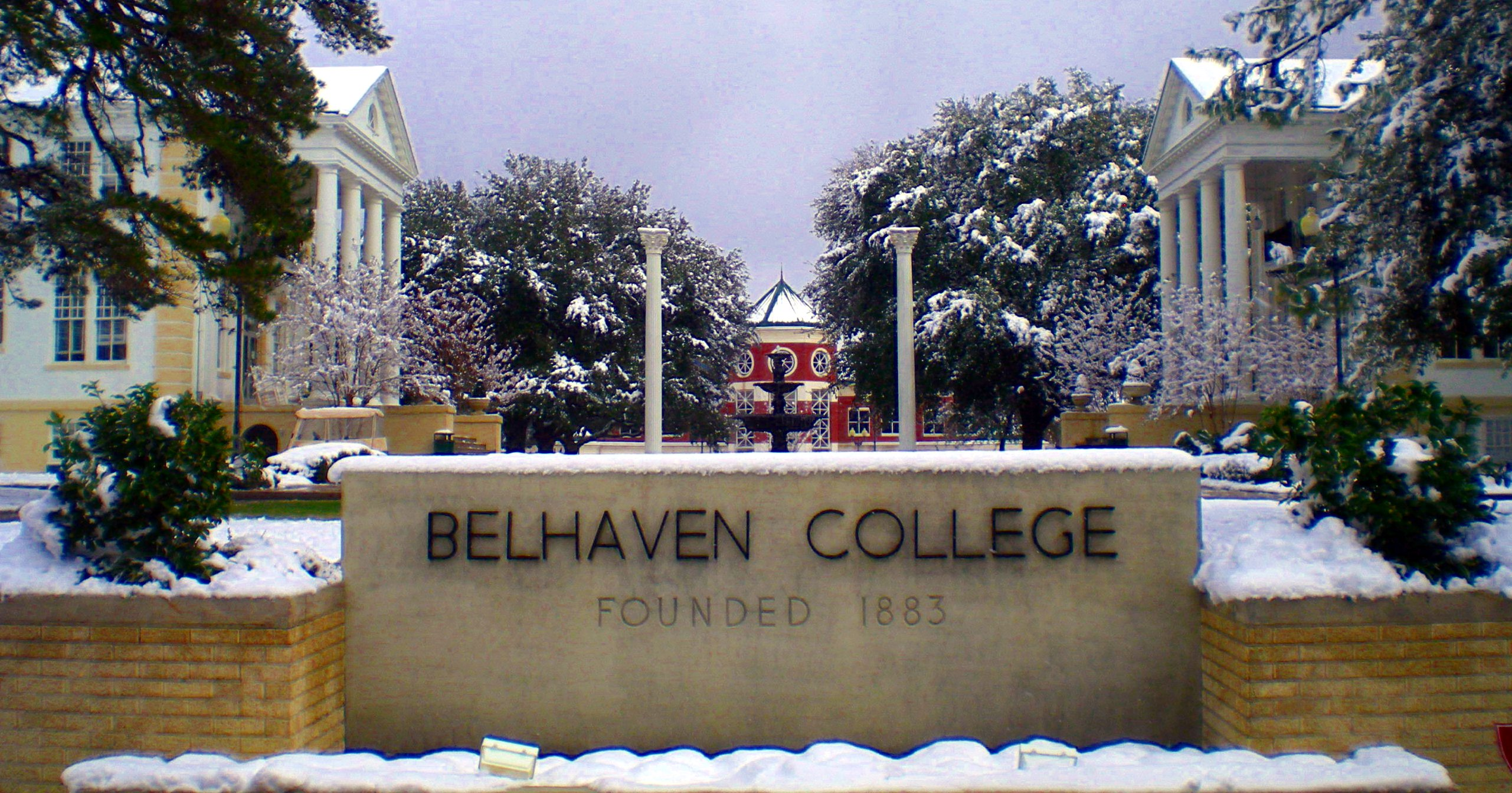
Stone sign

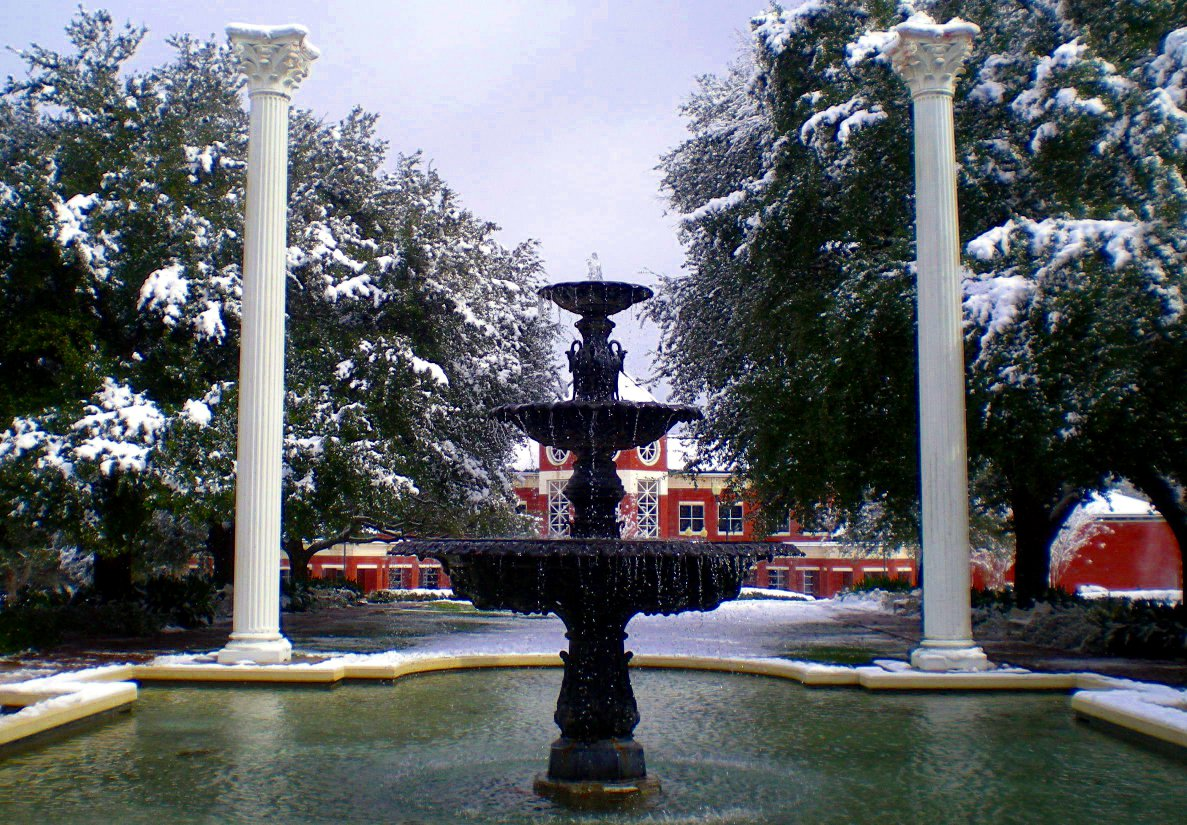
Fountain

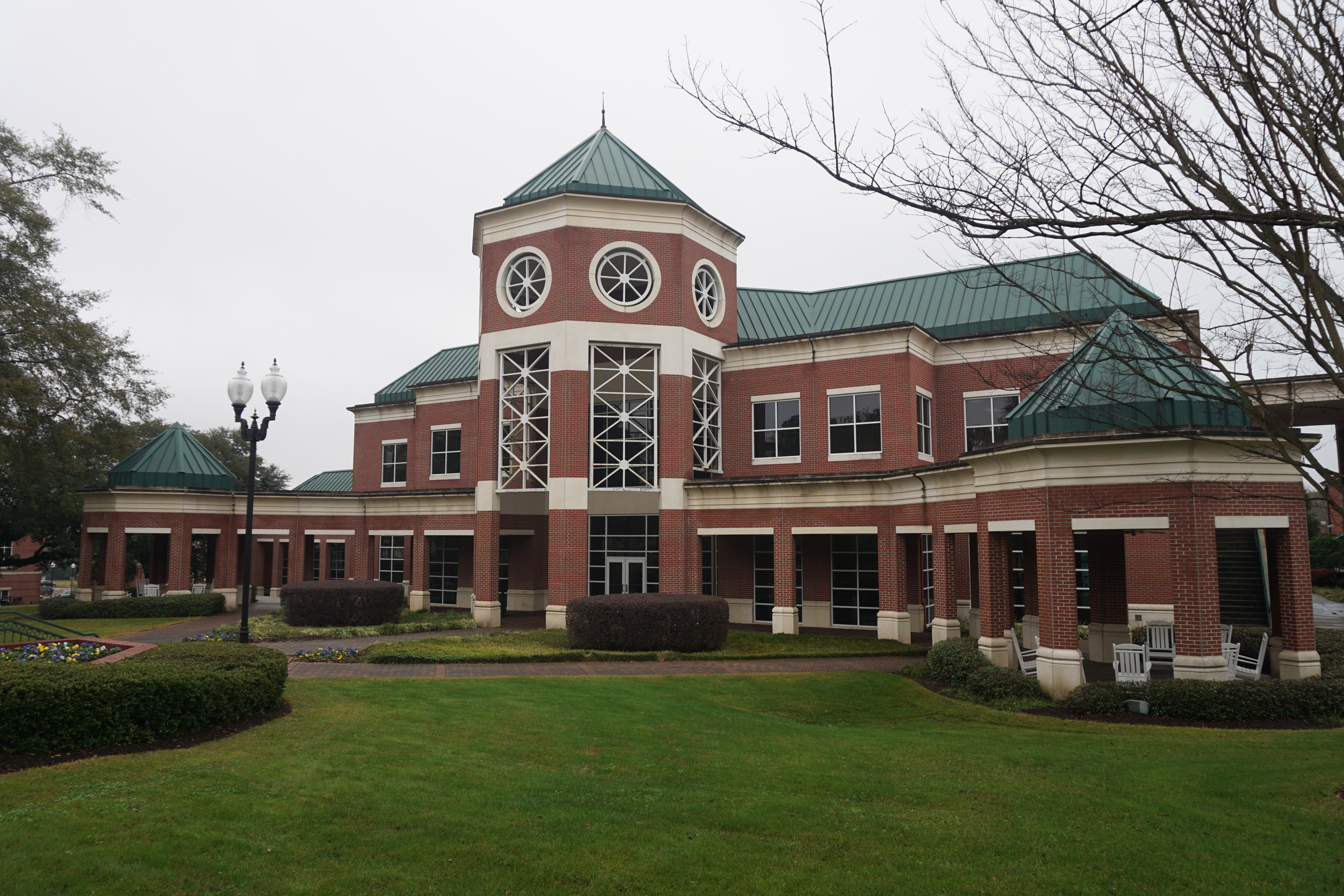
McCravey-Triplett Student Center

Belhaven University offers bachelor's degrees in 27 major areas of study. Master's degrees are offered in business administration, leadership, public administration, teaching, and education, among others, and Doctorate degrees are offered in business administration and education.

=== Fine arts ===
Belhaven University is accredited by the National Association of Schools of Art and Design, the National Association of Schools of Music, the National Association of Schools of Dance and the National Association of Schools of Theater, making Belhaven one of only 36 colleges and universities accredited in the all four of the major arts (visual arts, music, dance and theater).

=== Accreditation ===
Belhaven is accredited by the Southern Association of Colleges and Schools to award associate, baccalaureate, and master's degrees. Twenty-seven bachelor's degree and eight Master's degree programs are offered. Departments offering specific majors are further accredited as follows: The Department of Music is an accredited institutional member of the National Association of Schools of Music, the Department of Art is an accredited institutional member of the National Association of Schools of Art and Design, the Department of Dance is an accredited institutional member of the National Association of Schools of Dance (NASD), and the Department of Theater is accredited institutional member of the National Association of Schools of Theater.

Belhaven University, through its School of Business Administration, has the following degree programs accredited by the International Assembly for Collegiate Business Education: Master of Business Administration (M.B.A.), Master of Science in leadership, Master of Science in Management, Bachelor of Science in accounting, Bachelor of Science in Business Administration, Bachelor of Business Administration, and Bachelor of Science in management.

== Athletics ==
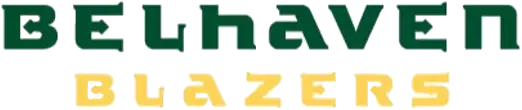
Belhaven Blazers wordmark

The Belhaven athletic teams are called the Blazers. The university is a member of the NCAA Division III ranks, primarily competing in the Collegiate Conference of the South (CCS) for most of its sports as a founding member since the 2022–23 academic year; while its football team competes in the USA South Athletic Conference (USA South). They were also a member of the National Christian College Athletic Association (NCCAA), primarily competing as an independent in the Mid-East Region of the Division I level. The Blazers previously competed in the D-III American Southwest Conference (ASC) from 2015–16 to 2021–22; in the Southern States Athletic Conference (SSAC; formerly known as Georgia–Alabama–Carolina Conference (GACC) until after the 2003–04 school year) of the National Association of Intercollegiate Athletics (NAIA) from 2010–11 to 2014–15; and in the HBCU Athletic Conference (HBCUAC; formerly known as Gulf Coast Athletic Conference (GCAC) until after the 2023–24 school year) from 2002–03 to 2009–10 (which they were a member on a previous stint from 1981–82 to 1999–2000).

Belhaven competes in 15 intercollegiate varsity sports. Men's sports include baseball, basketball, cross country, football, golf, soccer, tennis and track & field; women's sports include basketball, cross country, soccer, softball, tennis, track & field and volleyball. The Belhaven Blazers are the mascots for all teams and Belhaven's colors are green and gold.

In 2010, the Belhaven Softball team finished 3rd nationally in the NAIA National Tournament. In 2011, Belhaven Softball finished as the #3 ranked team in the nation. The Blazers have been in the World Series 7 of the past 10 years with NCCAA #2 finishes at the national tournament in 2016 and 2018. The Blazers have been coached by Kevin Griffin for the past 10 years. Griffin has amassed the most wins in Belhaven softball history.

The men's soccer team won the 2012 NAIA National Championship, compiling a record of 19–4–1. Men's soccer had also won the national title in 1992.

Charlie Rugg led the men's tennis team to the 1983 NAIA National Championship.

== Notable alumni ==
- Cameron Achord, National Football League (NFL) coach and current Special Teams Coordinator of the New England Patriots
- Thelma Farr Baxter, Democratic member of the Mississippi House of Representatives
- Joel Bomgar, founder of Bomgar, Republican member of the Mississippi House of Representatives.
- John Brady, former head basketball coach, Louisiana State University, and current head coach of Arkansas State University.
- Tramaine Brock, former NFL cornerback for the San Francisco 49ers.
- Mary Hawkins Butler, mayor of Madison, Mississippi, since 1981; one of the longest-serving mayors in the United States
- Craig Demmin, former professional footballer, notably for Rochester Rhinos, Trinidad and Tobago, and the Tampa Bay Mutiny of Major League Soccer
- Rachel Dolezal, former president of the Spokane NAACP, who resigned following allegations that she had lied about her racial identity and other aspects of her biography.
- Marie Hull, artist.
- Mary Katherine Loyacano McCravey, artist
- Janet McDonald (mathematician), Vassar College professor emerita
- Elizabeth Spencer, author of The Light in the Piazza.
- Angie Thomas, author of the young adult novel The Hate U Give
