= Longleaf Trace =

Paved trail between Hattiesburg and Prentiss, Mississippi, USA

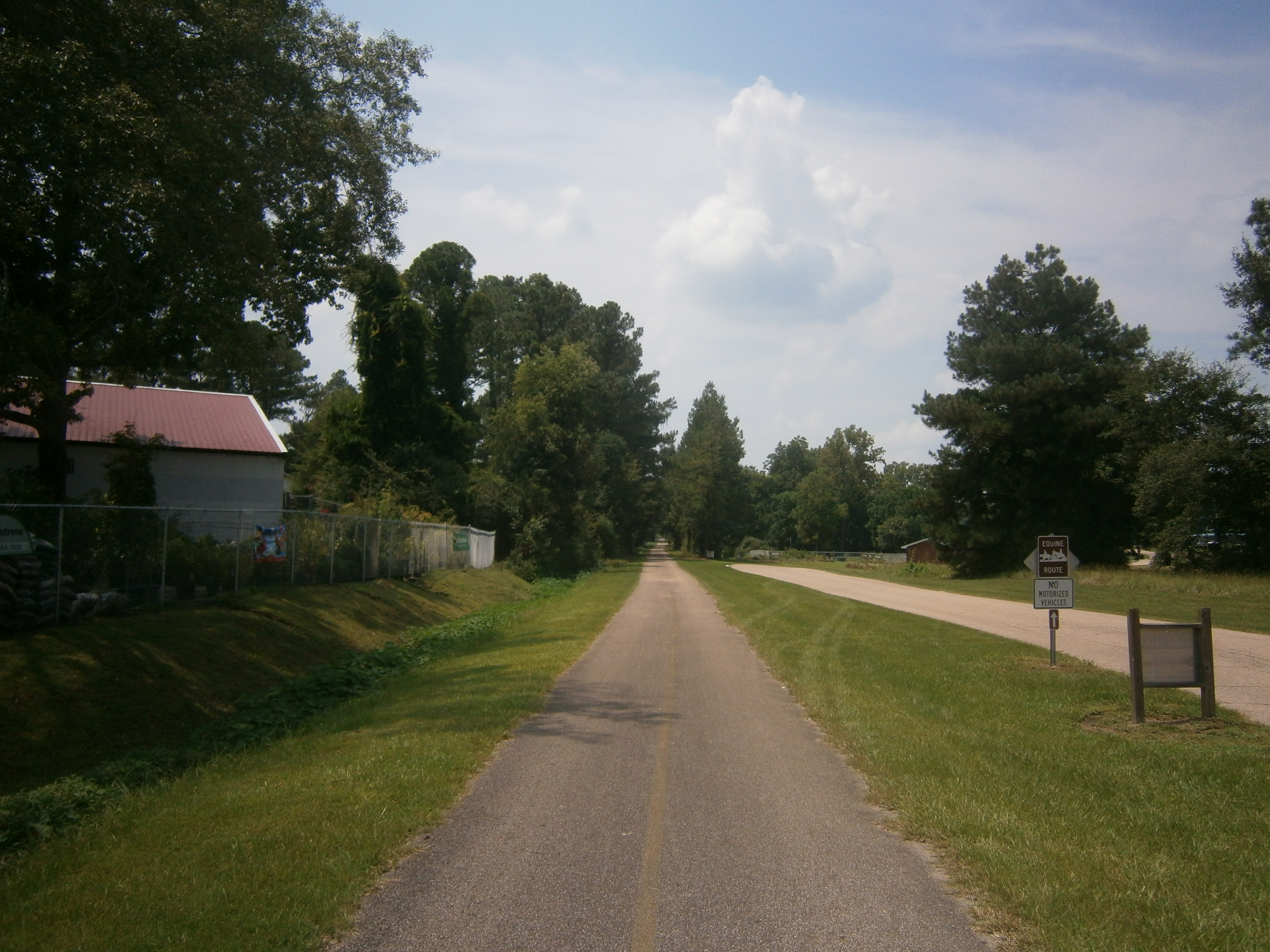
- Longleaf Trace in Sumrall, MS (2013)
- Length: 44 miles (71 km)
- Location: south Mississippi
- Established: 2000
- Trailheads: Prentiss, Mississippi (31.59773°N 89.86642°W); Hattiesburg, Mississippi (31.33220°N 89.29259°W)
- Use: pedestrian, equestrian, rollerblade, bicycle, and electric golf cart
- Surface: asphalt
- Right of way: Mississippi Central Railroad
- Website: www.longleaftrace.org

The Longleaf Trace is a 44-mile (71 km) paved pedestrian, equestrian, rollerblade, and bicycle trail between Hattiesburg and Prentiss, Mississippi, United States. Constructed in 2000, the trail follows a portion of the abandoned Mississippi Central Railroad line. It has nine stations along its route (Prentiss, Ed Parkman Road, Carson, Bassfield, Lott Circle, Sumrall, Epley, Clyde Depot, and Jackson Road).

Trail access is from public-road access points only, located an average of 5 miles (8.0 km) apart. In Hattiesburg there are rest stops and parking lots accessing the trail at the University of Southern Mississippi, at West 4th Street, and at Jackson Road.

The slope of the trail is very gradual, rising 50 ft/mi at the steepest accessible segment. Rest stops are provided around every two miles, and weather stops are located at reasonable distances. Mile markers ease navigating the trail.

Wildlife such as wild rabbits, squirrels, raccoons, songbirds, and deer can be seen along the trail. The trail also supports a variety of flora, including flowering dogwood and magnolia trees and fragrant honeysuckle and wisteria. Many of the trees between Hattiesburg and Sumrall have identification signposts.
