= Belhaven Neighborhood =

Neighborhood of Jackson, Mississippi, United States

Coordinates: 32.315384°N 90.173606°W

Belhaven Neighborhood or "The Greater Belhaven Area", often simply called "Belhaven", is a neighborhood located in Jackson, Mississippi. Belhaven Neighborhood is named after the home of Confederate veteran Jones S. Hamilton, which became the namesake of Belhaven University. Belhaven is a historic district and one of Jackson's oldest neighborhoods and cultural centers as well as home to many of the city's oldest houses and buildings. Many popular and successful locally owned businesses are located within Belhaven, including a number of restaurants, shops, stores, and a bed and breakfast inn. Belhaven is considered to be one of the most architecturally diverse neighborhoods in the United States, much of which can be seen through the Greater Belhaven Neighborhood Architectural Tour.

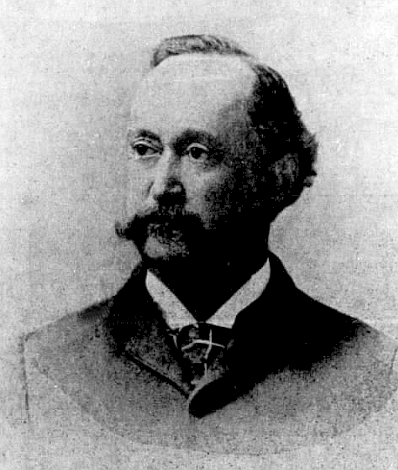
Confederate Colonel Jones S. Hamilton, whose old house is the namesake of the Belhaven Neighborhood.

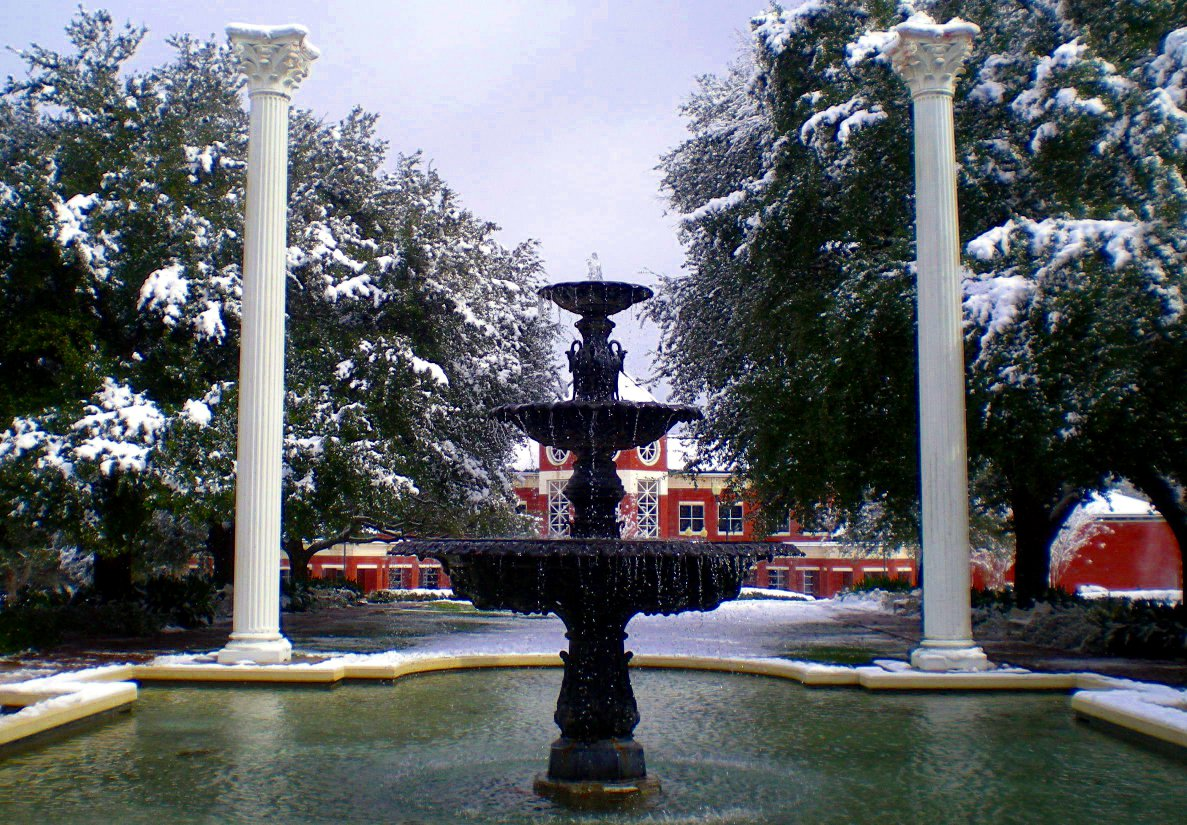
The Fountain on the campus of Belhaven University, one of The Greater Belhaven Area's best-known landmarks.

== Belhaven Subdivisions ==
Belhaven is subdivided into two major areas: Belhaven and Belhaven Heights. The borders of Belhaven are generally considered to be Woodrow Wilson Avenue to the north, Interstate 55 (I-55) to the east, Fortification Street to the south, and State Street to the west. The borders of Belhaven Heights are generally considered to be Fortification Street to the north, Interstate 55 (I-55) to the east, High Street to the south, and State Street to the west. The Greater Belhaven Neighborhood Foundation represents the residents of both areas and their interests. Belhaven Heights is noticeably more hilly than Belhaven, although both areas are among the highest elevations within Jackson. Although local residents tend to refer to the area north of Fortification Street as "Belhaven" and the area south of it as "Belhaven Heights", most residents refer to both areas collectively as "The Greater Belhaven Area" or simply "Belhaven" when used in the context of The City of Jackson as a whole.

== Bright Lights, Belhaven Nights Festival ==
Once per year near the beginning of Autumn, Belhaven hosts "Bright Lights, Belhaven Nights", a neighborhood-wide festival and block party featuring food from a variety of local restaurants, music from local musicians and bands, and a variety of other entertainment, as well as a number of souvenir and street vendors.

== History ==
The area now known as Belhaven Neighborhood or "The Greater Belhaven Area", then located to the north of Jackson city limits, remained largely unsettled until shortly after the American Civil War. Many Jackson residents, seeking refuge after the destruction and chaos wrought by Union soldiers during and after the Siege of Jackson, moved northward and began rebuilding their homes.

Jones S. Hamilton, a veteran of the Confederate States Army who became a millionaire from convict leasing after the war, built a "palatial home [...] on Boyd Street, east of Jefferson." Hamilton named it Belhaven after his ancestors's house in Scotland. In 1894, he donated it to the "Belhaven College for Young Ladies", a new college chartered by Dr. Lewis Fitzhugh in what is now Belhaven Heights. In 1910, the house burned down but was reopened in 1911 as "Belhaven Collegiate and Industrial Institute" at its current location on Peachtree Street. In 1915, the school was renamed "Belhaven College". Subsequently, residents began referring to the area around the school as "The Belhaven Neighborhood" or simply "Belhaven". Over the years the name has extended to include what became known as Belhaven Heights. Today, the use of the name "Belhaven" can refer to "The Greater Belhaven Area" (meaning both "Belhaven" and "Belhaven Heights", Belhaven University, or both.

Fortification Street, which runs East and West through Belhaven, is paved over what was once one of the last Confederate battle lines during the Siege of Jackson. Although most structures in Jackson were burned by Union soldiers employing a Scorched Earth Policy during and after the siege (under the direction of General Ulysses S. Grant), many of Belhaven's older structures remained untouched.

== Locally Owned Businesses ==
Belhaven is home to many of Jackson's finest restaurants including Lou's Full-Serv, Keifer's Restaurant (Greek casual fare), The Pizza Shack, The Manship Wood Fired Kitchen, and La Cazuela Mexican Grill—each of which has won several "Best of Jackson" awards from the Jackson Free Press. Fenian's Pub, an authentic Irish Public House or "Pub", is also located in Belhaven and is one of Jackson's most popular bars. Belhaven is also home to many other locally own businesses, such as McDade's Market and Kat's Wine Cellar. New Stage Theatre is also located in Belhaven and is one of only a handful of theaters located in the Jackson-Metro Area. The Fairview Inn, located on Fairview Street and built as a private mansion in 1908, is today run as a luxury bed and breakfast inn and spa. Old House Depot, located on Monroe Street, is an architectural salvage warehouse and retail store which specializes in antiques and vintage housing decor.

== Residents ==
Belhaven houses one university within the neighborhood itself, Belhaven University, and is located within relative proximity to two other universities, The University of Mississippi Medical Center and Jackson State University, as well as two colleges, Millsaps College and Mississippi College School of Law. Thus, many of Belhaven's residents are either faculty or staff working at one (or more) of these institutions, or students. As a result, Belhaven has an eclectic mix of young residents, many of which are from out-of-state and often remain only as long as they are attending school, living alongside older residents who tend to be more permanent. Likewise, Belhaven is home to a widely diverse dog and cat community. Often in the mornings and evenings many dogs can be seen walking or jogging beside their owners on the various sidewalks paved throughout the neighborhood. As well, there are a number of local, outdoor cats who are known by many of the residents on any particular street, most of whom are friendly.
