= Camp Lincoln (Massachusetts) =

American Civil War camp

Coordinates: 42.2683°N 71.8130°W

Camp Lincoln was an American Civil War camp that existed in 1861 in Worcester, Massachusetts. It was located on the Agricultural Fairgrounds, around the Elm Park neighborhood. It was named after Levi Lincoln Jr., the 13th Governor of Massachusetts and first Mayor of Worcester. On June 3, 1862, the camp was renamed Camp Wool, in honor of John E. Wool, the oldest general in the regular army. Units trained here included the 21st, 25th, 34th, 36th, 49th, 51st, and 57th regiments of Massachusetts infantry. Camp Scott, named for Major General Winfield Scott, also existed in Worcester for about 6 weeks in June–August 1861 as a training camp for the 15th Massachusetts Infantry Regiment.

== Units Trained ==
- 21st Regiment Massachusetts Volunteer Infantry
- 25th Regiment Massachusetts Volunteer Infantry
- 34th Regiment Massachusetts Volunteer Infantry
- 36th Regiment Massachusetts Volunteer Infantry
- 49th Regiment Massachusetts Volunteer Infantry
- 51st Regiment Massachusetts Volunteer Infantry
- 57th Regiment Massachusetts Volunteer Infantry

== Today ==
The site today is a dense neighborhood, partly occupied by Becker College, established in 1887. A plaque commemorating the Camp stands at Elm Park, which sits just across from where the fairgrounds were located.

== See also ==
- List of military installations in Massachusetts
