= Thompson–Boling Arena =

Arena in Knoxville, Tennessee, United States

Thompson–Boling Arena at Food City Center
- "The Summitt"

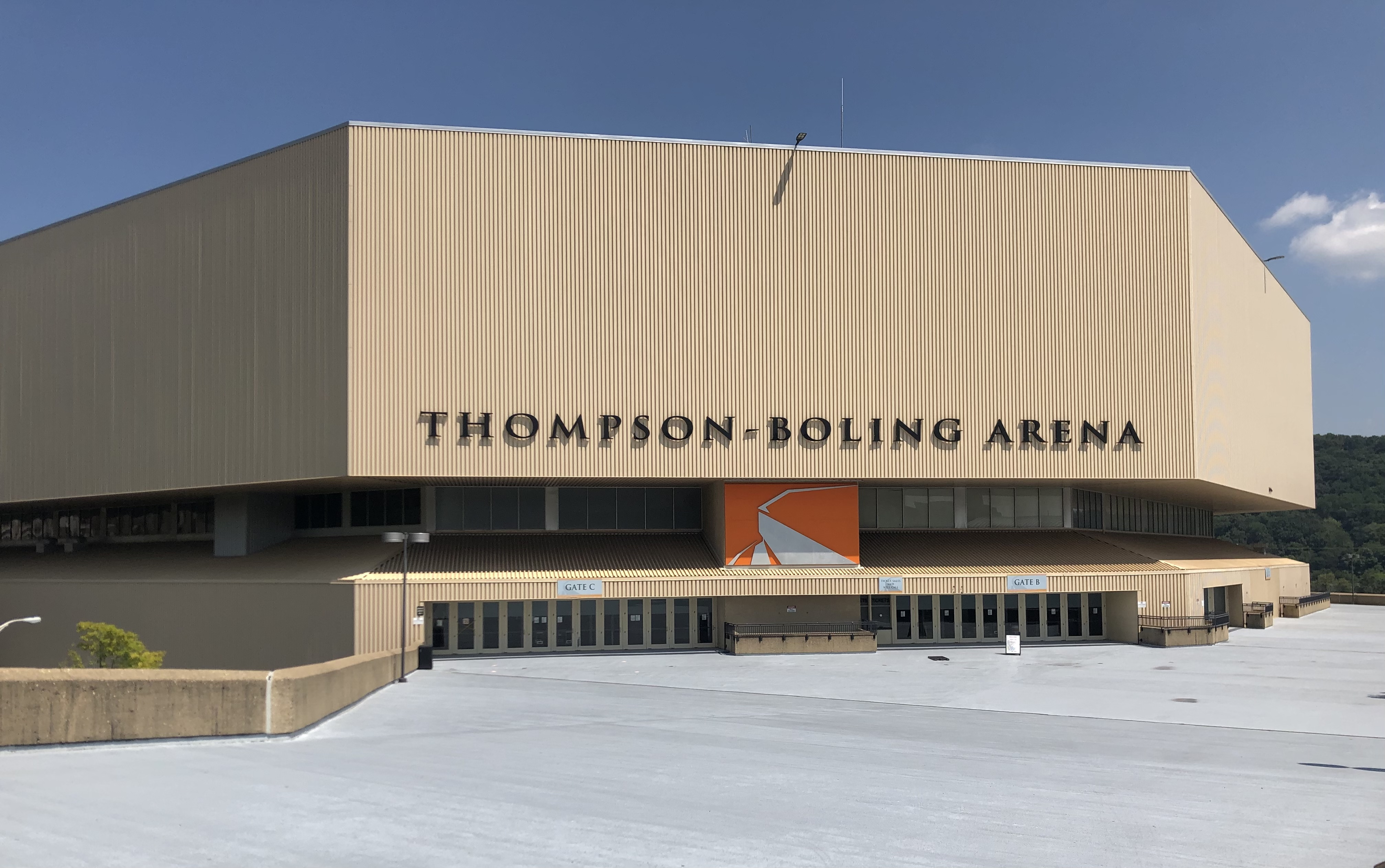
- The arena in August 2021
- Interactive map of Thompson–Boling Arena at Food City Center
- Location: 1600 Phillip Fulmer Way; Knoxville, Tennessee; 37916
- Coordinates: 35°57′4.2″N 83°55′30.1″W
- Owner: University of Tennessee
- Operator: University of Tennessee
- Capacity: 21,678 (2007–present); 24,535 (1987–2007)
- Surface: Wooden Court

Construction
- Groundbreaking: November 2, 1983
- Opened: December 3, 1987
- Renovated: 2007
- Cost: $40 million ($113 million in 2025 dollars)
- Architects: GSCD, Inc. Architects; Cideco Architecture & Planning Inc.
- Structural engineer: Ross H. Bryan Engineers Inc.
- General contractors: Ray Bell & Associates Construction

Tenants
- Tennessee Volunteers (men's basketball) (NCAA) (1987–present); Tennessee Lady Vols (women's basketball) (NCAA) (1987–present); Tennessee Lady Vols (women's volleyball) (NCAA) (2008–present)

Thompson–Boling Arena at Food City Center is a multi-purpose arena on the campus of the University of Tennessee in Knoxville, Tennessee, United States. The arena opened in 1987. It is home to the Tennessee Volunteers (men) and Lady Vols (women) basketball teams. Since 2008, it has been home to the Lady Vols volleyball team. It is named after B. Ray Thompson and former university president Edward J. Boling. The basketball court is named "The Summitt" after the late Lady Vols basketball coach Pat Summitt. It replaced the Stokely Athletic Center. The mammoth octagonal building lies just northwest of the Tennessee River, and just southwest of Neyland Stadium. As an echo of its neighbor and a tribute to the brick-and-mortar pattern atop Ayres Hall, the baselines of the court are painted in the familiar orange-and-white checkerboard pattern.

== History ==
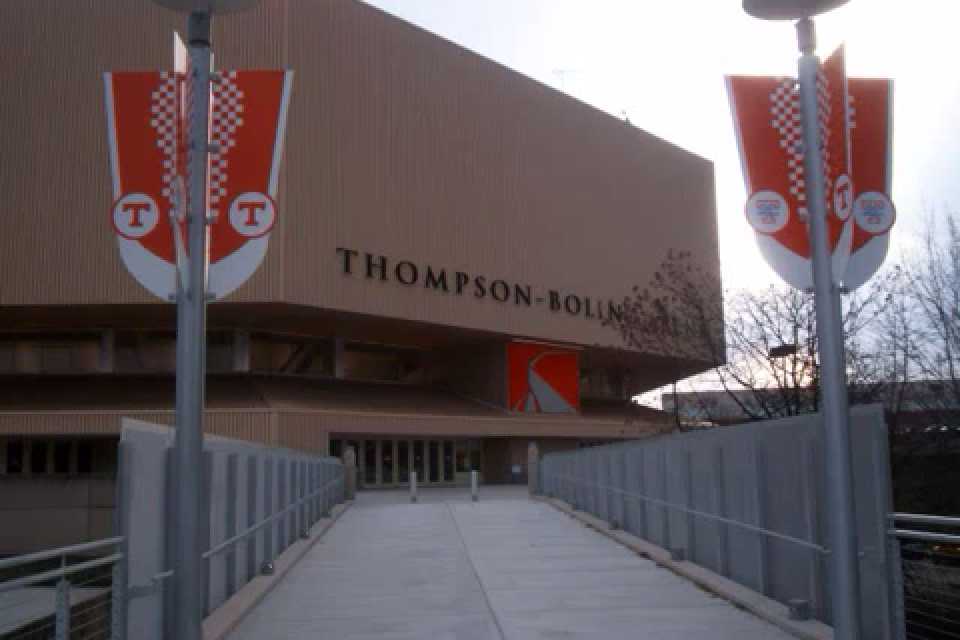
The entrance in 2011.

In terms of seating capacity, Thompson-Boling was at one time the largest facility ever built specifically for basketball in the United States with a seating capacity of 24,535 until its 2007 renovation. The current capacity is 21,678. The men's record crowd was 25,610 for a game against Kentucky on January 21, 1989, which is also the SEC record for a regular-season game. The Lady Vols' record crowd of 24,653, set at their win over archrival UConn on January 7, 2006, is also the all-time record for an NCAA regular-season women's game.

The facility hosted the 1989 Southeastern Conference men's basketball tournament. It hosted games of the NCAA men's basketball tournament in 1990 (first and second rounds), 1994 (regional), and 1999 (regional), and the 1990 NCAA Women's Final Four.

Since 2001, it has played host to Knoxville's Living Christmas Tree.

In August 2006, ground was broken for the Pratt Pavilion, a basketball practice facility to be located adjacent to the arena. It was ready for use in early November, but not all exterior construction were finished.

On November 30, 2006, plans were announced at utsports.com to add new renovations to Thompson–Boling Arena. Renovations included black seats, a center hung scoreboard, and concourse refurbishments, such as graphics and other amenities. Also added were luxury suites and loge seating. Construction began in March 2007. Phase I was finished in late October 2007 with an opening game against the Temple Owls of the Atlantic 10 Conference.

Phase II is scheduled to include a new lighting system, new ticket kiosks, and new food courts.

The outer volume of Thompson–Boling Arena is approximately 17 million cubic feet (480,000 m^{3}).

During the 2006–2007 and the 2007–2008 year, the University of Tennessee Men's Basketball team went 16–0 in Thompson–Boling Arena. As of November 18, 2008, Bruce Pearl's home record at Thompson–Boling Arena was 47–2, a home winning percentage at Tennessee of 96%.

On February 5, 2009, history was made at Thompson–Boling Arena, as the Tennessee Lady Vols defeated the Georgia Bulldogs 73–43, to give head coach Pat Summitt her 1,000th win.

It is also a concert venue, holding up to 25,000 people. It has been Tennessee's largest arena since it was opened. Only Greensboro Coliseum Complex has had a larger capacity among other arenas in the Southeast.

== See also ==
- List of indoor arenas in the United States
- List of NCAA Division I basketball arenas
