= Singing Christmas tree =

Artificial Christmas tree filled with singers

A living Christmas tree

A singing Christmas tree, sometimes called a living Christmas tree, is an artificial Christmas tree filled with singers used as part of nativity plays.

Constructed of steel, the "tree" is actually a conical circular sector where between one-third and one-half of an actual Christmas tree is shown. Depending upon the tree size, they can accompany between 30 and 450 singers. These trees can be put up by churches or communities.

First appearing in 1933 at Belhaven University, they later made their debut indoors at West High School in Denver, Colorado, and then in 1957 in Sacramento, California. Since then, the singing Christmas tree concept has spread to Canada, the Philippines, South Korea, Switzerland and Sri Lanka. The most attended tree takes place in Knoxville, Tennessee, with 60,000 attendees in 2007.

== History ==
The first Christmas trees came to the United States in the 1740s from Moravian (now part of the Czech Republic) settlers. In 1851, the first commercial tree lot in the United States was set up in New York City. President of the United States Franklin Pierce set up the first Christmas tree in the White House in 1856. Artificial trees were first developed in Germany in the 19th century over concerns of deforestation in their native homeland along with fire safety issues. By the 1960s, artificial trees become very popular in the United States.

Christmas caroling originated in Europe in the 13th century with an interest in the birth of Jesus, including the nativity. Caroling continued throughout Europe until the Protestant Reformation of 1517–1648 which led to the halt of the religious use of carols in some Protestant countries, such as England and Scotland. Despite being banned from European churches, they were still sung in homes and by door-to-door carolers on begging visits (charity solicitations) during Christmas despite protestations from the Puritan revolution in England in the 1640s. Caroling was done a limited basis between 1660 and the 19th century. By 1878, caroling was revived by the Church of England when it was combined with scripture reading to form a worship service called "Lessons and Carols". Caroling's growth has continued into the 20th century both in Europe and the United States and is now part of Christmas music.

One of the caroling traditions in homes was to sing around the Christmas tree. In 1933, Belhaven College (Belhaven University since 1 January 2010) in Jackson, Mississippi, became the first place to have a "Singing Christmas Tree" though it has been outdoors on an annual basis. The first indoor singing Christmas tree would take place in December 1941 at Denver's West High School in Colorado. The first performance featured fifty students dressed in choir robes, adorned with glittering home-made ornaments and halos. Every singer held evergreen branches and stood on a wooden framework in the shape of a Christmas tree and sang nine Christmas carols at a school assembly. Since its inception, the high school choir tree has received nationwide and international recognition. During World War II, pictures of the tree were printed in many major newspapers, eliciting letters from soldiers around the world who responded to the simple, yet awesome beauty of the tree. A decade after its creation, a life-size photograph of the tree was displayed in New York's Rockefeller Center. The tree was first used as an outreach tool for Christmas in 1963 in Van Nuys, California. The first steel-framed tree with choir risers was constructed by Millard Heath Specialties of Denton, Texas, for the First Baptist Church in their city in 1972 (That tree was still in use in Callahan, Florida, as of April 2005.). Millard Heath alone has constructed over 200 "trees" for churches in 30 American states and outside the United States.

Among the locations for Singing Christmas Trees outside the United States are in Pampanga, Philippines; Suwon, South Korea; Winnipeg, Manitoba; Yarmouth, Nova Scotia; and Zurich, Switzerland.

== Tree structure and composition ==
Steps for choir members leading to their spots in the Living Christmas Tree

Broadcast control for the 2009 Living Christmas Tree at First Baptist Church Conyers (Georgia). Their tree ran 2001-09 and 2011–17.

Singing Christmas Trees are constructed to hold between 30 and 450 choral singers at one time. These trees can come in four models ranging in height from 18 to 48 feet (5.5 to 14.6 m) for indoor use and can be custom fit for outdoor use. They can also come in circular design of 120, 150, or 180-degree models. Trees can also have seating for choir members with special needs. They are fitted with artificial fireproof evergreen leaves and Christmas lights in an effort to lessen workload assembly and disassembly. Besides lighting, they are fitted with controls to allow for usage by a master control within a church sanctuary or community. As an example, a tree in Huntsville, Alabama, holds 150 singers, is 30 feet (9.1 m) tall (39 feet (12 m) tall if the star at the top of tree is included), consumes 36 kW of electrical power during its performance run on an annual basis, weighs 6,000 pounds (2,700 kg), uses 377 pieces of structural steel that is bolted with over 800 pieces, uses 7500 pieces of artificial greenery, and has over 13,000 lights.

== Choral composition within the tree ==
Scene during which choir members (shown on left) enter the 2009 Living Christmas Tree

Choral composition within the tree ideally would have an equal number of men and women in the tree with the sopranos and/or lighter members at the top of the tree, followed by the altos and tenors in the middle of the tree, and the bass and heavier singers at the bottom of the tree. Male choir members are arranged in the middle of the tree.

Singers who require sitting in a chair or a stool during the performance are located in the bottom two rows of the tree. Choir members who are acrophobic (fear of heights) are located near the bottom of the tree while claustrophobic (fear of restriction or suffocation) choir members are located at the outside of the tree. Most choir members stand for the entire time period of the performance.

== Tree as part of the Christmas program ==
2009 Living Christmas tree at First Baptist Church Conyers prior to the 13 December 2009 evening service, including scenes for the program. The orchestra is located at the bottom right.

Many trees are part of nativity plays or nativity scenes that celebrate Christmas as the birth of Jesus.

== Noted singing or living Christmas trees ==
"Holy Ground" singing on the importance of the life of Jesus in the 2009 Living Christmas Tree at the First Baptist Church (Conyers, Georgia). The church's Living Christmas Tree ran from 2001 to 2017.

- The Belhaven College Tree is the oldest tree, having originated in 1933.
- The Sacramento, California-based Capital Christian Center (formerly Bethel Temple) celebrated its 60th Singing Christmas Tree in 2016.
- The Singing Christmas Tree in Portland, Oregon, first started in 1962. The 2009 performances had noted guest singers such as Timothy Greenridge, Michael Allen Harrison, Georgine Rice, Aaron Meyer, and The Jefferson Dancers.
- Thomas Road Baptist Church in Lynchburg, Virginia, features singing Christmas trees decorated with a custom midi light set that changes colors and design that is precisely synced to music.
- Carolina Voices in Charlotte, North Carolina, also uses four ensembles outside their tree to promote the Christmas message.
- Sevier Heights Baptist Church of Knoxville, Tennessee, began theirs in 1989 at their church, drawing 2800 people. The tree was held at the church annually until 1994. The following year, the tree moved to the Tennessee Theatre in downtown Knoxville where they started with six performances and 10,000 attendees in 1995 to twelve performances and 19,000 attendees in 2000. By 2001, the tree moved again to Thompson–Boling Arena, located on the campus of the University of Tennessee where 37,000 people total saw the tree in four separate performances. 55,000 attended the 2006 tree while 60,000 people attended the five services of the 2007 tree that also involved 600 salvations. The 2008 tree included Spanish translation along with 350 salvations.
- Bellevue Baptist Church in Tennessee celebrated their 41st year in December, 2016.
- In 2009, several trees posted on the Internet also had their 25th presentation. Among them were Ozark Christian College (Joplin, Missouri), United Baptist Church of Ashland, Kentucky; and First Baptist Church of Huntsville, Alabama. The First Baptist Church of Montgomery, Alabama, celebrated their 30th year of the tree in 2009.
- Mona Shores High School's America's Tallest Singing Christmas Tree, founded in 1987, features about 300 singers and a live symphony orchestra.
- Den Sjungande Julgranen (The Singing Christmas Tree in Gothenburg), created in 2004 by Amy Elizabeth Wheeler and Göteborg & Co., is an outdoor municipal production for the city of Gothenburg, Sweden. It is well-loved by Gothenburgians and attracts many tourists from Gothenburg's European and Nordic neighbors. The production runs for three weeks in December with 2-3 shows every day, features several kinds of choirs singing in different musical styles, and includes choreography and percussion. The artistic director is Amy Elizabeth Wheeler, and the producer is Göteborg & Co.
