= Prentiss, Mississippi =

- Town
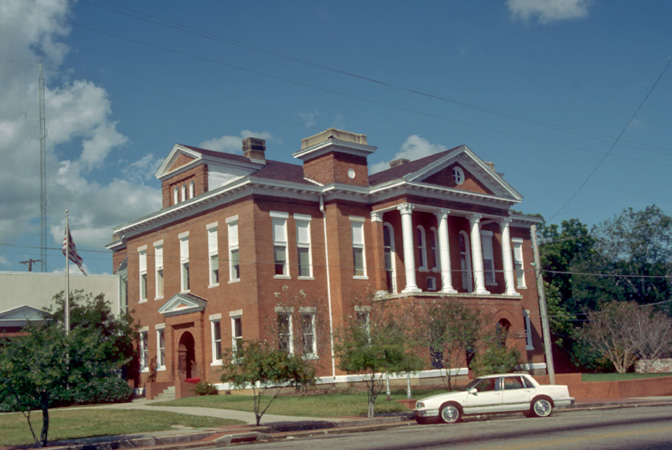
- The Jefferson Davis County Courthouse is one of four sites in Prentiss listed on the National Register of Historic Places.

- Flag Logo
- Motto: "The Natural Choice"
- Location of Prentiss, Mississippi

- Location in the United States
- Coordinates: 31°35′49″N 89°52′11″W
- Country: United States
- State: Mississippi
- County: Jefferson Davis

Government
  - Type: Mayor-Aldermen
  - Mayor: Tony Waits
- Aldermen: Rhonda Bayles; Holley Cochran; Willard Davis; Hal "Moochie" Speights; Becky Williamson

Area
  - Total: 2.99 sq mi (7.75 km^{2})
  - Land: 2.99 sq mi (7.75 km^{2})
  - Water: 0 sq mi (0.00 km^{2})
- Elevation: 331 ft (101 m)

Population (2020)
  - Total: 976
  - Density: 326.4/sq mi (126.01/km^{2})
- Time zone: UTC-6 (Central (CST))
  - Summer (DST): UTC-5 (CDT)
- ZIP code: 39474
- Area code: 601
- FIPS code: 28-59920
- GNIS feature ID: 0676320
- Website: townofprentiss.gov

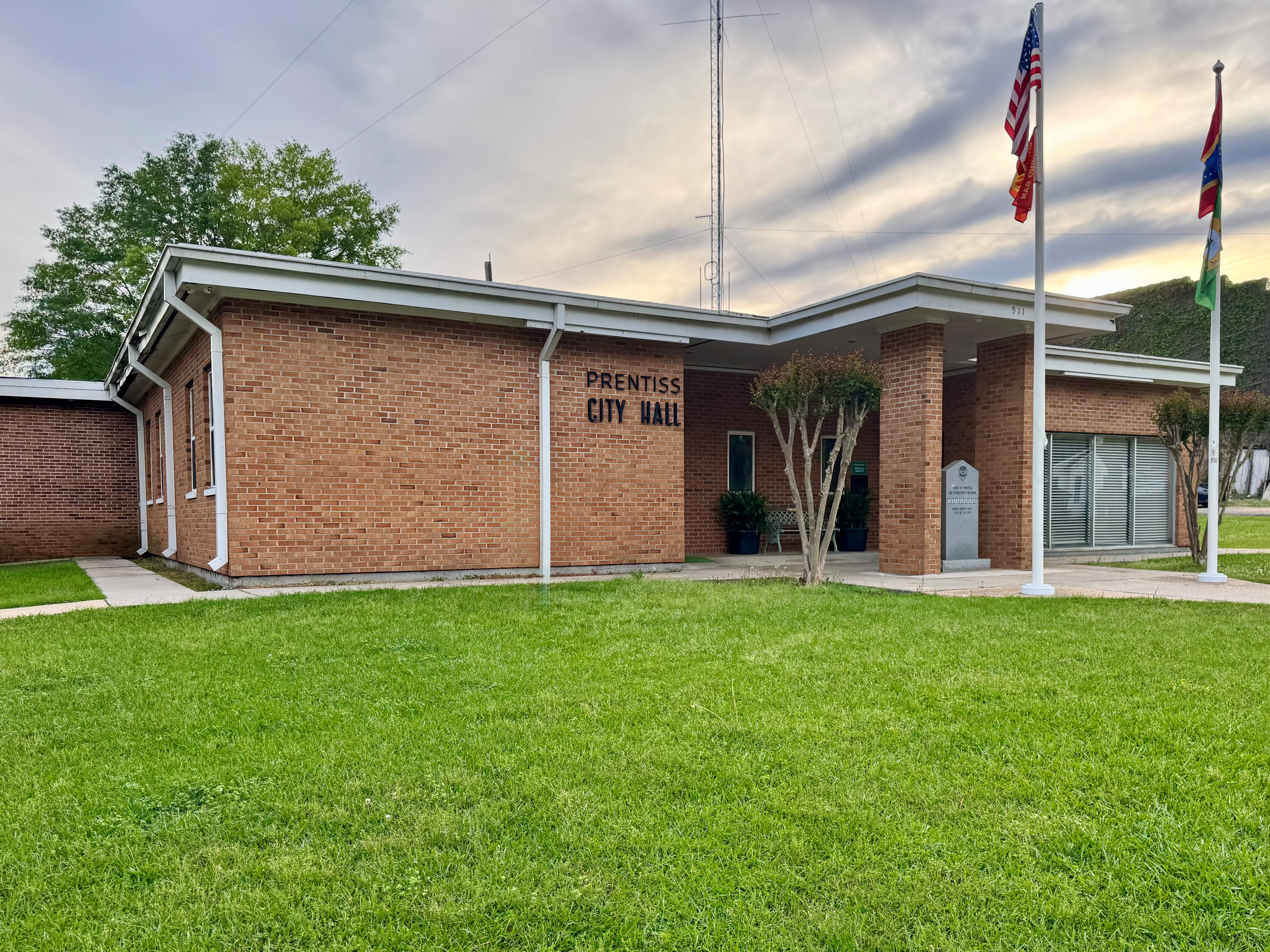
City Hall

Prentiss is a town in and the county seat of Jefferson Davis County, Mississippi, United States. As of the 2020 census, Prentiss had a population of 976.

Prentiss is located on the Longleaf Trace, Mississippi's first recreational rail trail.

== History ==
Originally part of Lawrence County, the town was first named "Blountville", after William Blount, an early settler and merchant. Blountville High School was established in 1885 on 10 acres (4.0 ha) of land. A depot was established in Blountville when the Pearl & Leaf Rivers Railroad (later Illinois Central Railroad) was completed in 1903. That same year the town was officially established and named "Prentiss", after Prentiss Webb Berry, a prominent landowner in the area.

When Jefferson Davis County was created in 1906, a special election determined that Prentiss would serve as the county seat. In 1907, Jonas Edward Johnson and his wife Bertha LaBranche Johnson established the Prentiss Institute. Situated on 40 acres (16 ha) of land, with remnants of slave quarters on the property, it was considered one of the finest schools for African Americans in Mississippi. The school at first taught only the elementary grades, and began with 40 students whose tuition was often paid with chickens, eggs and produce. A Rosenwald classroom was built on the campus in 1926, and by 1953 the "Prentiss Normal and Industrial Institute" included a high school and junior college, had 44 faculty and more than 700 students, and included 24 buildings and 400 acres (160 ha) of farmland, pasture and forest. In 1955, Heifer International donated 15 pure-bred cows to the school with the intention that the offspring be donated to needy farm families. It is noteworthy that the school gave some of the animals to poor white families. The school closed in 1989 and was designated an official Mississippi landmark in 2002.

Ralph Fults and Raymond Hamilton, members of the notorious Barrow Gang, robbed the bank in Prentiss in 1935.

In 1958, Rev. H.D. Darby of Prentiss filed a federal lawsuit challenging Mississippi's rigid voting eligibility laws for African Americans; it was the first lawsuit of its kind in Mississippi.

Prentiss police officer Ron Jones, Jr. was shot and killed by Cory Maye while executing a search warrant in 2001.

== Geography ==
Prentiss is located in central Jefferson Davis County at 31°35′49″N 89°52′11″W. U.S. Route 84 passes north and west of the town center on a bypass; the four-lane highway leads east 20 miles (32 km) to Collins and west 16 miles (26 km) to Monticello. Mississippi Highway 13 passes through the town slightly east of the center; it leads north 27 miles (43 km) to Mendenhall and south 26 miles (42 km) to Columbia. Mississippi Highway 42 leads southeast from Prentiss 11 miles (18 km) to Bassfield.

According to the United States Census Bureau, the town has a total area of 1.9 square miles (4.9 km^{2}), all land.

== Demographics ==
Historical population
Census	Pop.	Note	%±
1910	640		—
1920	468		−26.9%
1930	655		40.0%
1940	989		51.0%
1950	1,212		22.5%
1960	1,321		9.0%
1970	1,789		35.4%
1980	1,465		−18.1%
1990	1,487		1.5%
2000	1,158		−22.1%
2010	1,081		−6.6%
2020	976		−9.7%
U.S. Decennial Census

=== 2020 census ===
Prentiss racial composition
Race	Num.	Perc.
White (non-Hispanic)	468	47.95%
Black or African American (non-Hispanic)	479	49.08%
Asian	2	0.2%
Other/Mixed	15	1.54%
Hispanic or Latino	12	1.23%

As of the 2020 United States census, there were 976 people, 429 households, and 289 families residing in the town.

=== 2010 census ===
As of the 2010 United States census, there were 1,081 people living in the town. 60.3% were White, 37.3% African American, 0.6% Native American, 0.4% Asian, 0.5% from some other race and 0.9% of two or more races. 0.6% were Hispanic or Latino of any race.

=== 2000 census ===
As of the census of 2000, there were 1,158 people, 479 households, and 323 families living in the town. The population density was 617.8 inhabitants per square mile (238.5/km^{2}). There were 537 housing units at an average density of 286.5 per square mile (110.6/km^{2}). The racial makeup of the town was 79.53% White, 19.17% African American, 0.60% Native American, 0.09% Asian, and 0.60% from two or more races. Hispanic or Latino of any race were 1.47% of the population.

There were 479 households, out of which 24.4% had children under the age of 18 living with them, 50.9% were married couples living together, 13.4% had a female householder with no husband present, and 32.4% were non-families. 30.9% of all households were made up of individuals, and 18.2% had someone living alone who was 65 years of age or older. The average household size was 2.26 and the average family size was 2.80.

In the town, the population was spread out, with 19.9% under the age of 18, 7.0% from 18 to 24, 23.9% from 25 to 44, 25.7% from 45 to 64, and 23.4% who were 65 years of age or older. The median age was 44 years. For every 100 females, there were 88.3 males. For every 100 females age 18 and over, there were 84.3 males.

The median income for a household in the town was $29,200, and the median income for a family was $38,571. Males had a median income of $31,875 versus $21,806 for females. The per capita income for the town was $18,486. About 17.2% of families and 22.5% of the population were below the poverty line, including 47.6% of those under age 18 and 9.7% of those age 65 or over.

== Arts and culture ==
=== Annual events ===
Prentiss hosts an annual "Run for the Roses 5K Run/Walk".

=== Tourism ===
Local attractions include:

- The Holloway-Polk house – the oldest continuously inhabited settlement in Jefferson Davis County.
- Lake Jeff Davis – a campground and picnic area southeast of Prentiss.
- Mt. Zion Church and Cemetery – the second-oldest African American church and cemetery in Jefferson Davis County.
- Spring Hill Missionary Baptist Church and Cemetery (c. 1847) – the oldest African American Baptist Church and cemetery in Jefferson Davis County.

== Parks and recreation ==
In 1993, the Canadian National Railway announced it would abandon the former Illinois Central line which ran through Prentiss. This enabled the construction of the Longleaf Trace, Mississippi's first recreational rail trail, located between Prentiss and Hattiesburg.

== Government ==
Detachment 2 of the 155th Brigade Combat Team of the Mississippi Army National Guard is located in Prentiss.

== Education ==
Prentiss is served by the Jefferson Davis County School District.

A football rivalry existed between Prentiss High School's "Bulldogs" and Columbia High School's "Wildcats" before Prentiss closed after the 2016-2017 school year. In one notable game during the 1970s, the Bulldogs were winning 6-0 when a Wildcats' player Walter Payton scored two touchdowns, running 95 yards for the first touchdown and 65 yards for the second. The Wildcats won 14-6.

There is one private school serving K-12 students, Prentiss Christian School.

== Media ==
The community is served by the Prentiss Headlight newspaper.

== Infrastructure ==
=== Transportation ===
Prentiss is accessed from Mississippi Highway 42, Mississippi Highway 13, and U.S. Route 84.

The Prentiss-Jefferson Davis County Airport is located 3 miles (5 km) west of the town.

=== Health care ===
The Jefferson Davis Community Hospital is located in Prentiss.

== Notable people ==
- Thelma Farr Baxter, member of the Mississippi House of Representatives from 1950 to 1956
- Vincent Davis, judge for the Mississippi 17th Chancery Court District and former Mississippi senator
- Al Jefferson, NBA player for five teams
- Felecia M. Nave, chemical engineer and 20th President of Alcorn State University
- Clyde Otis, songwriter and record producer
- Garland H. Williams, law enforcement specialist in covert operations

== In popular culture ==
Blues musician Houston Stackhouse stated that fellow musician Tommy Johnson: "was stayin' over around Prentiss, Mississippi. I believe, I don't know how long he stayed there, but that was his hangout. It was out east of Crystal Springs, back there around Prentiss and Pinola, or somewhere back in there. Big piney thickets and like that."
