= Statue of William Francis Bartlett =

Statue in Boston, Massachusetts, U.S.

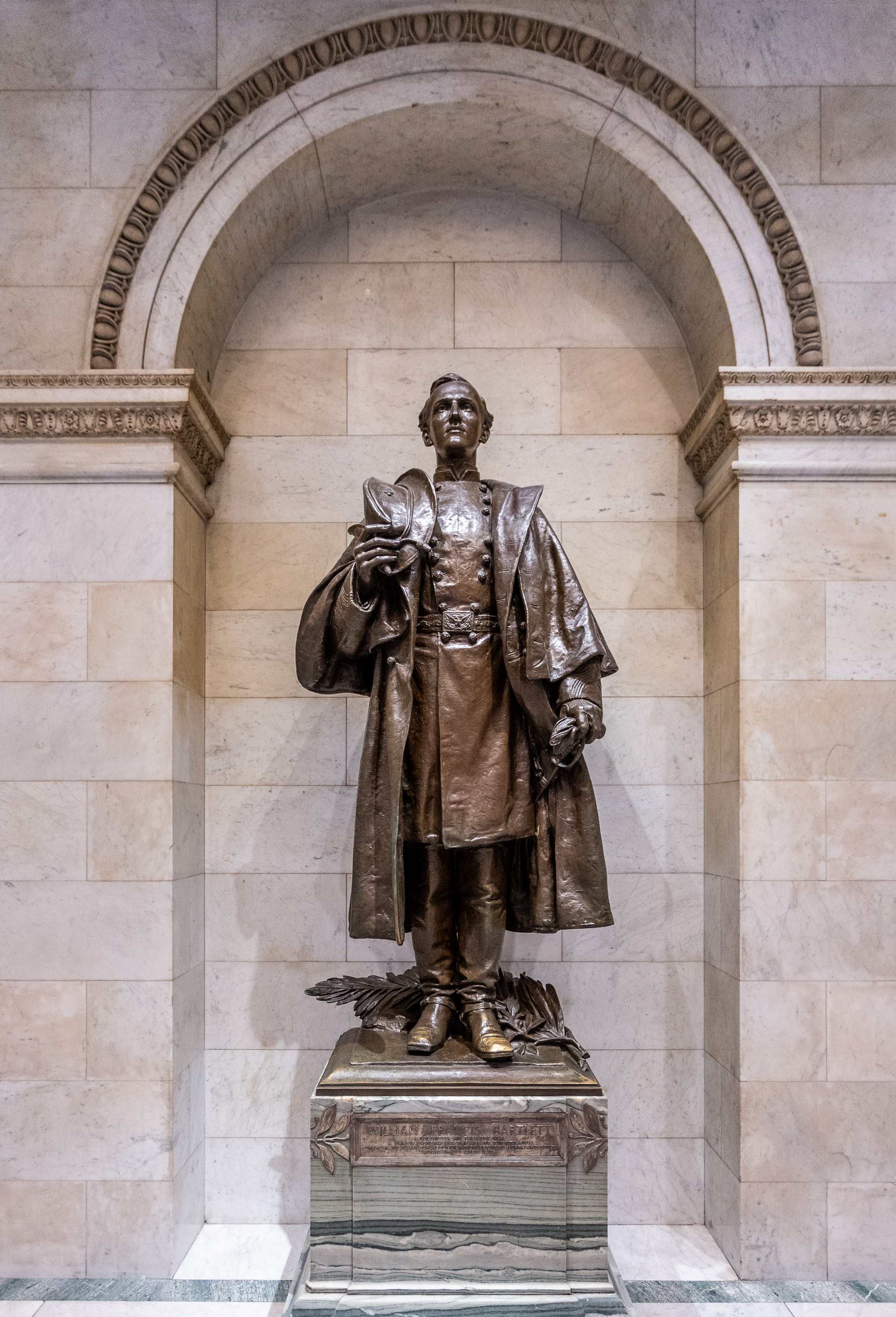
- The statue in 2020
- Location: Massachusetts State House, Boston, Massachusetts, United States
- Designer: Daniel Chester French (sculptor); Henry Bacon (architect)
- Fabricator: Bonney-Bonnard Company
- Type: Statue
- Material: Bronze; Marble (pedestal)
- Dedicated date: May 27, 1904
- Dedicated to: William Francis Bartlett

A statue of William Francis Bartlett stands inside the Massachusetts State House in Boston, Massachusetts, United States. The bronze statue was designed by sculptor Daniel Chester French and honors Bartlett, who had served as a general in the Union Army during the American Civil War. The statue was dedicated in 1904.

== History ==
=== Background ===
William Francis Bartlett was born in Haverhill, Massachusetts in 1840. At the outbreak of the American Civil War in 1861, while attending Harvard College, he enlisted in the Massachusetts Volunteer Militia and rose through the ranks in the Union Army, holding various ranks as military officers. He was recognized for his actions during the siege of Port Hudson and at the end of the war was awarded the honorary rank of major general. Following the war, he returned to Massachusetts and served for a brief time on the staff of the Governor of Massachusetts. He also gave several speeches during this time in favor of reconciliation and national unity, including at the dedication of Harvard University's Memorial Hall. He died in 1876 in Pittsfield, Massachusetts.

In 1901, Massachusetts Governor Winthrop M. Crane signed into effect a resolution calling for the creation and dedication of a statue in Bartlett's honor on the grounds of the Massachusetts State House. The statue would be paid for by the government of Massachusetts at a price not to exceed $20,000. The following year, the Massachusetts Governor's Council passed an ordinance requesting sculptor Daniel Chester French to submit a proposal for the statue, with a contract between French and the government dated January 29 of that year. Architect Henry Bacon would craft the pedestal for the statue. In 1903, the Massachusetts General Court amended their previous resolution by allowing the Governor and his council to place the statue within the state house, and that same year, they decided that the statue would be located in the memorial hall of the capitol. The casting for the statue was done by the Bonney-Bonnard Company of New York City.

=== Dedication ===
The statue was unveiled in the state house on May 27, 1904, the 41st anniversary of the siege of Port Hudson. The crowd that had gathered in the memorial hall included members of Bartlett's family, former members of regiments he had been a part of, and numerous other political and military officials. Colonel Charles Shaler had been selected by the U.S. Secretary of War as the United States Army's representative to the ceremony. The dedication began at 2:30 p.m. with buglers playing "To the Colors". Following this, Massachusetts Lieutenant Governor Curtis Guild Jr. gave a brief address and presented the statue, with the statue unveiled at the end of his speech. The statue had previously been covered by American flags. At the moment of its unveiling, the band from the First Corps of Cadets played "The Star-Spangled Banner". Concluding the performance, Governor John L. Bates gave an address wherein he accepted the statue on behalf of the state of Massachusetts.

At the end of the governor's speech, the ceremony moved from the memorial hall to the chambers of the Massachusetts House of Representatives.The Right Reverend William Lawrence (bishop of the Episcopal Diocese of Massachusetts) opened this part of the ceremony with a prayer. Afterwards, the band played "Pilgrim Chorus from Tannhäuser" and Morris Schaff gave an oration. The band then played a selection called "Songs of the Civil War" and Executive Secretary Edward F. Hamlin read aloud several tributes of Bartlett written by officers from the Confederate States Army before the band played "America". The ceremony concluded with a benediction given by Bishop Lawrence.

In 1921, the statue was relocated from Memorial Hall to north of Doric Hall.

== Design ==
The statue stands 7.3 feet (2.2 m) tall and depicts Bartlett dressed in the uniform of a major general. He is wearing a caped overcoat and holds a hat in his right hand, with his left hand resting on the hilt of his sword. The statue is made of bronze and bears a light green patina. On the plinth behind the statue are depictions of a laurel branch and olive branch representing, respectively, Fame and Peace. The statue stands atop a pedestal made of Cippolino marble which has a green color. Laurel made of silver is set into the stone on the sides of the pedestal, and on the front these laurel leaves meet at a silver plaque which bears the inscription:

WILLIAM FRANCIS BARTLETT / A VOLUNTEER IN THE CIVIL WAR / A MAJOR GENERAL AT THE AGE OF TWENTY-FOUR / FOREMOST TO PLEAD FOR RECONCILIATION BETWEEN NORTH AND SOUTH / BORN 1840 … DIED 1876

== See also ==
- 1904 in art
- Public sculptures by Daniel Chester French

== Bibliography ==
- Burrill, Ellen Mudge (1921). The State House: Boston Massachusetts (7th ed.). Wright and Potter printing Company, state printers – via Google Books.
- A Record of the Dedication of the Statue of Major General William Francis Bartlett. Governor of Massachusetts and Massachusetts Governor's Council. Wright and Potter Printing Company. 1905 – via Internet Archive.
