= Janet McDonald (mathematician) =

American mathematician, professor

- Born: September 3, 1905; Wesson, Mississippi, US
- Died: October 29, 2006 (aged 101); Madison, Mississippi, US
- Burial place: Prentiss Cemetery
- Education: Belhaven College for Young Ladies; Tulane University; University of Chicago
- Occupations: Mathematician, professor

Janet McDonald (1905–2006) was an American mathematician who specialized in geometry, specifically the concept of Conjugate Nets. She taught at Vassar College for 27 years and was named professor emerita in 1971.

== Life and work ==
McDonald (sometimes spelled MacDonald) was born in Wesson, Mississippi, on September 3, 1905, and was the first child of Joseph McDonald and Bessie Walden McDonald.

She earned her bachelor's degree from Belhaven College for Young Ladies in Jackson in 1925, and then she taught for three years in secondary schools in nearby Jefferson Davis County. She completed her M.A. degree in mathematics from Tulane University in 1929 and joined the faculty of Mississippi Synodical College (1929-1932) to head the math department. In 1932, she was named department head and registrar at Hinds Junior College in Raymond, Mississippi (1932-1941).

With the start of World War II, McDonald enrolled at University of Chicago to pursue her Ph.D. but after two years of study, she took on a teaching role there. She completed her doctorate in 1943 (showing her name as Janet MacDonald) with her dissertation titled Conjugate nets in asymptotic parameters. She was immediately hired by Vassar College in New York, first as an instructor and moving to professorships, chair and then professor emerita (1971). She particularly enjoyed teaching geometry and encouraged students to pursue advanced degrees in math. She remained there in a teaching capacity for 27 years.

Throughout her life, she enjoyed studying and traveling abroad, "spending much of her leisure in England, Scotland (home of her paternal grandfather), France, Greece, and Spain. Her extended studies took her to the University of Rome and Indiana University." For example, in 1951, she spent the summer in her native Mississippi studying.

She spent most of her time doing work in mathematics on projective differential geometry, especially conjugate nets, and studying Italian in preparation for her leave of absence second semester next year. At that time, she went to study projective differential geometry and algebraic geometry at the University of Rome. She chose Rome because Professors Enrico Bompina and Francesco Severi, leaders in her field of study, were lecturing there.

On her retirement in 1971, she returned to Jackson, Mississippi and taught some classes at her alma mater, Belhaven College.

McDonald died October 29, 2006, in Madison, Mississippi, after a brief illness at 101 years of age.
