= Orlando Boss =

Orlando Phidelio Boss
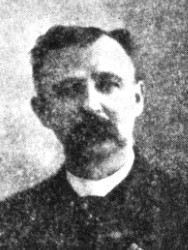
- Born: July 30, 1844; Fitchburg, Massachusetts
- Died: December 28, 1931 (aged 87); Fitchburg, Massachusetts
- Burial place: Fitchburg, Massachusetts
- Military career
- Allegiance: United States of America
- Branch: United States Army; Union Army
- Service years: 1861 - 1864
- Rank: Corporal
- Unit: 25th Regiment Massachusetts Volunteer Infantry
- Conflicts: American Civil War • Battle of Cold Harbor
- Awards: Medal of Honor

Army Medal - 1862 - 1895

Orlando Phidelio Boss (1844-1931) was a corporal in Company F, 25th Massachusetts Volunteer Infantry during the American Civil War. He received Medal of Honor for his bravery at the Battle of Cold Harbor, Virginia on June 3, 1864. Prior to rescuing Lieutenant Daly of his regiment, he had dragged another wounded comrade to safety among the enemy fire. He had then appealed to his brigade commander, General George J. Stannard, for permission to rescue the lieutenant. General Stannard consented, and Boss succeeded in bringing the wounded office despite a torrent of enemy gunfire that erupted at him during his deed.

Boss joined the Army from his hometown of Fitchburg, Massachusetts in September 1861, and mustered out in October 1864.

== Medal of Honor citation ==
Boss' official Medal of Honor citation reads:

The President of the United States of America, in the name of Congress, takes pleasure in presenting the Medal of Honor to Corporal Orlando Phidelio Boss, United States Army, for extraordinary heroism on 3 June 1864, while serving with Company F, 25th Massachusetts Infantry, in action at Cold Harbor, Virginia. Corporal Boss rescued his lieutenant, who was lying between the lines mortally wounded; this under a heavy fire of the enemy.

== See also ==
- List of Medal of Honor recipients
- List of American Civil War Medal of Honor recipients: A–F
