= 25th Massachusetts Infantry Regiment =

25th Regiment Massachusetts Volunteer Infantry
- Active: September 1, 1861 to July 28, 1865
- Country: United States
- Allegiance: Union
- Branch: Infantry
- Engagements: Battle of Roanoke Island; Battle of New Bern; Battle of Swift Creek; Battle of Cold Harbor; Siege of Petersburg; Carolinas campaign Battle of Wyse Fork

The 25th Regiment Massachusetts Volunteer Infantry was an infantry regiment that served in the Union Army during the American Civil War.

== Service ==
The 25th Massachusetts was organized at Camp Lincoln in Worcester, Massachusetts, beginning September 1, 1861 and mustered in for a three-year enlistment on October 31, 1861, under the command of Colonel Edwin M. Upton.

The regiment was attached to Foster's 1st Brigade, Burnside's Expeditionary Corps, to April 1862. 1st Brigade, 1st Division, Department of North Carolina, to December 1862. Lee's Brigade, Department of North Carolina, to January 1863. 2nd Brigade, 1st Division, XVIII Corps, Department of North Carolina, to June 1863. 2nd Brigade, 1st Division, Defenses of New Bern, North Carolina, Department of North Carolina, to August 1863. District of the Pamlico, North Carolina, Department of Virginia and North Carolina, to September 1863. Defenses of New Bern, North Carolina, Department of Virginia and North Carolina, to October 1863. Heckman's Brigade, Newport News, Virginia, Department of Virginia and North Carolina, to January 1864. Unattached, United States Forces, Portsmouth, Virginia, Department of Virginia and North Carolina, to March 1864. 2nd Brigade, United States Forces, Portsmouth, Virginia, to April 1864. 1st Brigade, 2nd Division, XVIII Corps, Department of Virginia and North Carolina, to September 1864. Defenses of New Bern, North Carolina, District of North Carolina, Department of Virginia and North Carolina, to March 1865. 3rd Brigade, 2nd Division, District of Beaufort, North Carolina, Department of North Carolina, to March 1865. 2nd Brigade Division, District of Beaufort, North Carolina, Department of North Carolina, to April 1865. 3rd Brigade, 1st Division, XXIII Corps, Department of North Carolina, to July 1865.

The 25th Massachusetts mustered out of service July 28, 1865.

== Detailed service ==
Moved to Annapolis, Md., October 31-November 1, and duty there until January 7, 1862. Burnside's Expedition to Hatteras Inlet and Roanoke Island, North Carolina, January 7 – February 7, 1862. Battle of Roanoke Island February 8. Expedition to New Bern March 11–13. Battle of New Bern March 14. Provost duty at New Bern until May 9. Reconnaissance toward Trenton May 15–16. Trenton Bridge May 15. Picket and outpost duty until July. Expedition to Trenton and Pollocksville July 24–28. Guard, picket, and outpost duty at New Bern until December 10. Demonstration on New Bern November 11. Foster's Expedition to Goldsboro December 10–20. Kinston December 14. Whitehall December 16. Goldsboro December 17. Duty at New Bern until October 1863. Demonstration on Kinston March 6–8, Core Creek March 7. Skirmishes at Deep Gully, New Bern, March 13–14. Demonstration on Kinston May 20–23. Gum Swamp May 22. Expedition to Swift Creek July 17–20, and to Winton July 25–31. Moved to Newport News October 16–18, and duty there until January 22, 1864. Moved to Portsmouth January 22, 1864, and duty in the defenses of that city until April 26. Moved to Yorktown April 26. Butler's operations on south side of the James River and against Petersburg and Richmond May 4–28. Occupation of City Point and Bermuda Hundred May 5. Port Walthal, Chester Station, May 6–7. Swift Creek or Arrowfield Church May 9–10. Operations against Port Darling May 12–16. Drury's Bluff May 14–16. Bermuda Hundred front May 17–28. Moved to White House, then to Cold Harbor May 28 – June 1. Battles about Cold Harbor June 1–12; before Petersburg June 15–18. Siege of Petersburg and Richmond June 16 to September 4. In the trenches at Bermuda Hundred August 25 – September 4. Moved to New Bern, North Carolina, September 4–10, and duty there until March 1865. Non-veterans ordered home October 5, 1864, and mustered out October 20, 1864. Demonstration from New Bern on Kinston December 9–13, 1864. Operations against Goldsboro, North Carolina, March 3–21. Battle of Wyes Fork March 8–10. Occupation of Kinston March 14. Moved to Goldsboro March 22–23, and duty there until April 3. Advance on Raleigh April 9–13. Occupation of Raleigh April 14. Moved to Greensboro May 3–7, then to Charlotte May 12–13, and duty there until July 13. Moved to Readville, Massachusetts, July 13–21.

== Casualties ==
The regiment lost a total of 330 men during service; 7 officers and 154 enlisted men killed or mortally wounded, 169 enlisted men died of disease.

== Commanders ==
- Colonel Edwin M. Upton – resigned October 28, 1862
- Colonel Josiah Pickett

== Notable members ==
- Corporal Orlando Phidelio Boss, Company F – Medal of Honor recipient for action at the Battle of Cold Harbor, June 3, 1864
- Corporal David P. Casey, Company C – Medal of Honor recipient for action at the Battle of Cold Harbor, June 3, 1864

== See also ==
- List of Massachusetts Civil War Units
- Massachusetts in the American Civil War
