= Powers' Cavalry Regiment =

- Active: 1861–1865
- Country: Confederate States
- Branch: Confederate States Army
- Type: Cavalry
- Size: Regiment
- Battles: American Civil War: Siege of Port Hudson; Battle of Plains Store

Powers' Cavalry Regiment was a unit of the Confederate States Army during the American Civil War. Formed in 1863 from Louisiana and Mississippi cavalry companies, Powers' regiment fought in the Western Theater before being disbanded in the later stages of the war.

== History ==
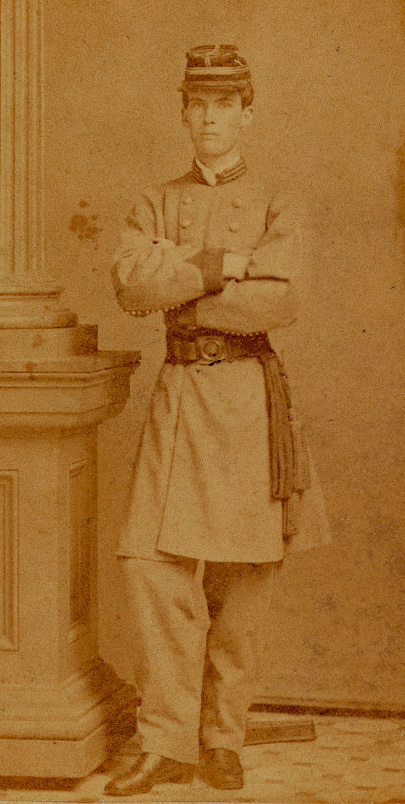
Captain A.J. Lewis of Company E, Powers' Regiment as a prisoner of war in New Orleans, 1863.

On May 16, 1863, General Franklin Gardner put Col. Frank P. Powers of the 14th Arkansas in charge of all cavalry forces based at Olive Branch, Louisiana. This cavalry force took part in the Siege of Port Hudson and fought at the Battle of Plains Store and other skirmishes around Port Hudson during the summer of 1863. Following these actions in 1863, Powers was tasked with forming a regiment of the Mississippi and Louisiana cavalry forces he had led that year. Because the new regiment was made up of mixed companies from 2 states, it is usually considered a Confederate government unit rather than a unit from a particular state.

Powers' Cavalry was based at Camp Polk, Louisiana and fought against Southern Unionist guerrillas in the Honey Island Swamp along the Mississippi-Louisiana border. The regiment took part in battles against General Henry Warner Slocum's Union troops around Clinton, Mississippi in the summer of 1864. On October 5th, Powers' Regiment clashed near Woodville, Mississippi with Union troops led by Col. Embury Osband. Powers' cavalry lost 54 killed in this battle.

Following a further series of skirmishes in Louisiana and Mississippi, on November 21, 1864, the regiment was disbanded. Seven Louisiana companies were formed into the 18th Louisiana Cavalry Battalion, and three Mississippi companies were formed into the 23rd Mississippi Cavalry Battalion. The Mississippi battalion was assigned to the brigade of General Wirt Adams and was later absorbed into Wirt Adams' Cavalry Regiment, the Louisiana battalion joined Daniel Gober's Louisiana mounted infantry.

Following the dispersal of his command in late 1864, Frank Powers was assigned the command of another Mississippi cavalry unit, also referred to as "Power's Regiment", however in the final stages of the war recruitment, morale, and desertion were major problems. In April, 1865, Powers' new regiment was assigned to join General Wirt Adams' Mississippi Brigade in General Nathan Bedford Forrest's Cavalry Corps, which had retreated into Alabama. However, as the Confederate cause seemed doomed at this stage, many of the troops deserted rather than fight on, and Powers was unable to bring more than 100 men with him. Forrest's Cavalry surrendered on May 9, 1865, at Gainesville, Alabama.

== Commanders ==
Commanders of Powers' Regiment:

- Col. Frank P. Powers
- Lt. Col. William McKewen
- Lt. Col. Joseph S. Terry

== Organization ==
Companies of Powers' Regiment:

- Company A, "Clay Dragoons" of Crystal Springs, Mississippi.
- Company B, of St. James, Ascension, and East Baton Rouge Parishes, Louisiana.
- Company C, of St. Helena Parish and East Baton Rouge.
- Company D, of St. Tammany and Washington Parishes.
- Company E, of Crystal Springs, Mississippi.
- Company F, of East Feliciana Parish, Louisiana.
- Company G, "Owen's Scouts" of Jefferson, Copiah, Claiborne, and Hinds Counties, Mississippi.
- Company H, of Washington Parish, Louisiana and Pike County, Mississippi.
- Company I, of Livingston, East Baton Rouge, and Ascension Parishes.
- Company K, of St. Tammany and Washington Parishes.

== See also ==
- List of Louisiana Civil War Confederate units
- List of Mississippi Civil War Confederate units
