= 49th Massachusetts Infantry Regiment =

49th Regiment Massachusetts Volunteer Infantry
- Active: October 28, 1862 – September 1, 1863
- Country: United States
- Allegiance: Union
- Branch: Union Army
- Type: Infantry
- Size: Regiment
- Part of: In 1863: 1st Brigade, 1st Division, XIX Corps
- Engagements: American Civil War

Commanders
- Colonel: William F. Bartlett

The 49th Regiment Massachusetts Volunteer Infantry was a regiment of infantry that served in the Union Army during the American Civil War. It was one of the 18 Massachusetts regiments formed in response to President Abraham Lincoln's August 1862 call for 300,000 men to serve for nine months. The regiment was recruited in Berkshire County and rendezvoused for mustering in at Camp Briggs in Pittsfield, Massachusetts. William F. Bartlett, a veteran of the 20th Massachusetts was voted colonel in command of the regiment. The 49th Massachusetts was assigned to the Department of the Gulf and saw heavy combat during the Siege of Port Hudson.

== Formation and early duty ==
Companies began assembling at Camp Briggs in Pittsfield on September 7, 1862. The final of the ten companies arrived on October 14 and the 49th Massachusetts was mustered in to federal service on October 28. The regiment moved to a larger and better outfitted training camp at Worcester, Massachusetts known as Camp Wool on November 7. Soon after arriving, on November 10, the unit elected officers in the tradition of Massachusetts militia. William F. Bartlett was placed in charge of the regiment as colonel and commanding officer.

Bartlett, a veteran of the 4th Battalion Massachusetts Infantry and the 20th Massachusetts Infantry, was already considered a war hero. At age 20, he set aside his studies at Harvard College to enlist as a private in the 4th Battalion. After serving his 90-day term, Bartlett became a captain in the 20th Massachusetts. He was shot in the knee during the Siege of Yorktown. The wound required the amputation of his left leg. Bartlett returned to Massachusetts to recuperate during the summer of 1862 and completed his studies at Harvard, though he suffered very much from his wound. He took charge of Camp Briggs on September 20 and so impressed the men of 49th Massachusetts with his soldierly bearing and his apparent ease in training them in the manual of arms on one leg that they unanimously elected him colonel. He was fitted with an artificial leg shortly before the regiment departed but still depended on the use of a crutch.

The regiment departed Massachusetts on November 29, 1862. After arriving in New York City by steamship, they marched down Broadway, crossed to Long Island and arrived at Camp Banks. At that site gathered the various regiments assigned to reinforce the Department of the Gulf in preparation for Major General Nathaniel P. Banks's planned expedition against Port Hudson, Louisiana. It was not until January 23, 1863 that the regiment boarded the steamship Illinois and departed for Louisiana. They passed New Orleans via the Mississippi River and went into camp at Baton Rouge on February 16.

On March 13, 1863, the 49th Massachusetts participated in a reconnaissance toward Port Hudson with their division commanded by Maj. Gen. Christopher C. Augur. The regiment did not engage in any combat during this reconnaissance. They afterward returned to their camp in Baton Rouge and for the next two months conducted uneventful guard duty in and around the city. During this time, the unit suffered greatly from disease. By May, 300 men of the unit which originally numbered roughly 1,000 were on the sick list. Just prior to the Siege of Port Hudson, only 450 men turned out for duty.

== Siege of Port Hudson ==
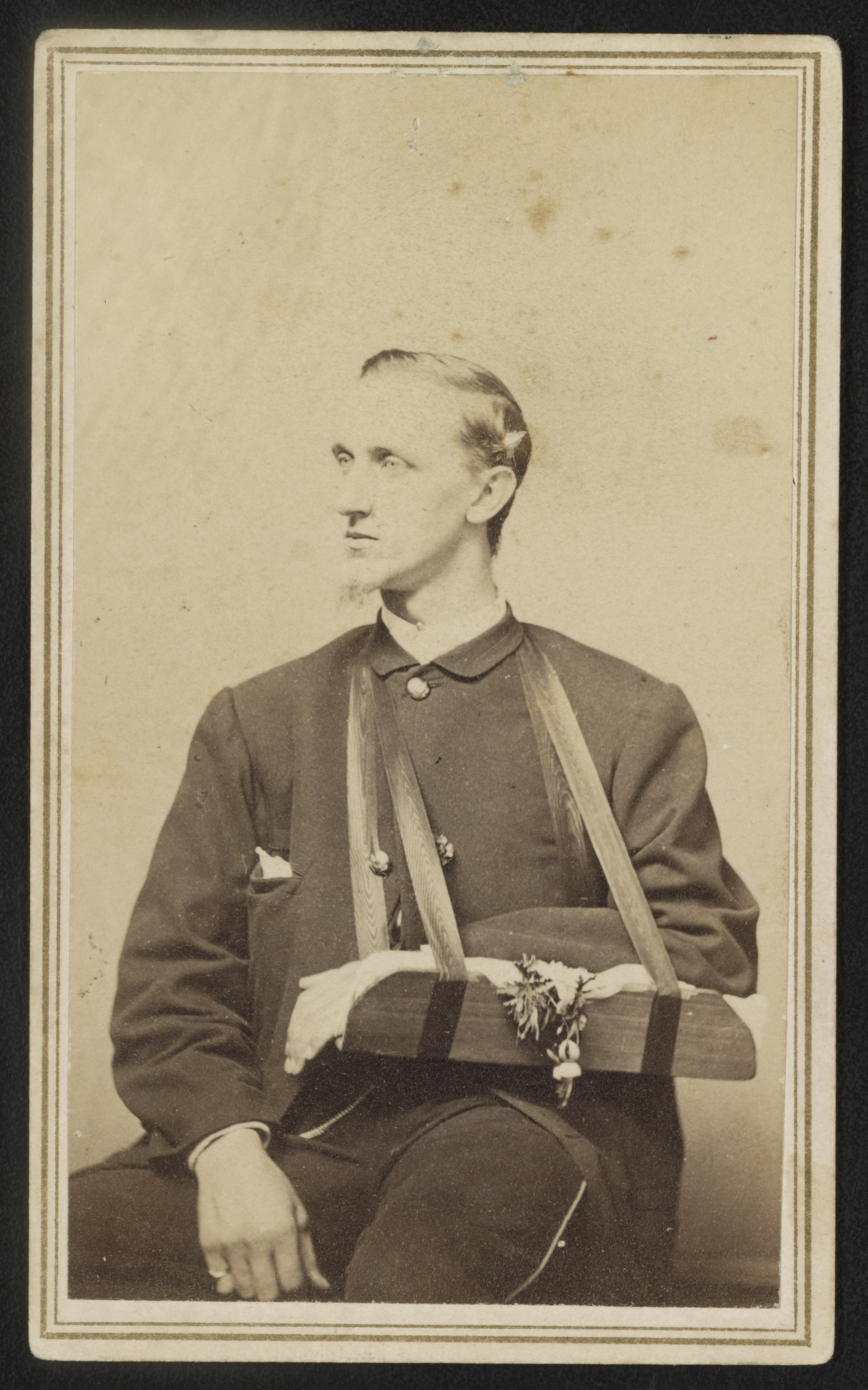
Col. William Francis Bartlett after wounded at Port Hudson

The advance on Port Hudson got underway on May 21, 1863 and the 49th Massachusetts left Camp Banks as part of the expedition on May 21. The regiment saw its first combat before the day was out as Union forces just outside of Baton Rouge encountered a Confederate column from Port Hudson precipitating the Battle of Plains Store. The 49th Massachusetts engaged in skirmishing with the enemy and a few men were wounded. During this engagement, Union troops succeeded in cutting off the last route of escape from Port Hudson.

On May 27, the 49th Massachusetts took part in the first assault on Port Hudson. A call was made for 200 volunteers for what was known as a "forlorn hope"—a storming party to lead the division's charge and lay down fascines to allow passage over ditches and trenches. The 49th Massachusetts supplied 65 of the 200 for this dangerous duty. The rest of the regiment advanced with the main body of the division. During the assault on May 27, the extremely rugged ground and tangle of felled trees proved too difficult and neither the storming party nor the main assault made sufficient progress. The 49th Massachusetts reached the foot of the Confederate earthworks gained the most advanced position of any unit in their division that day. The regiment lost 16 killed and 64 wounded.

Due to the amputation of his leg and the extremely rugged ground, Col. Bartlett was required to remain on horseback during battle, making him an easy target for Confederates. During the May 27 assault, Bartlett was shot twice— a bullet shattered his left wrist, while buckshot struck his right leg. The regimental surgeon, Dr. Frederick Winsor, was able to remove the bullet and save his hand, but the wounds effectively removed him from command until the end of the 49th's term of service in September 1863.

During the second assault on Port Hudson, the 49th Massachusetts remained in support, firing on the Confederate position as other units attempted to take the earthworks but failed. The regiment lost one killed and 17 wounded during the second assault. The Confederate troops in Port Hudson eventually surrendered on July 9, 1863.

== Battle of Cox's Plantation ==
Following the surrender, the 49th Massachusetts moved with their division to Donaldsonville, Louisiana as part of operations to engage the remaining Confederate forces in western Louisiana. The regiment fought in the Battle of Cox's Plantation on July 11 and 12. Confederate forces pushed superior Union numbers back six miles during this engagement. During the retreat, the 49th nearly became surrounded. The unit lost three killed, five wounded and 16 prisoners. This was the regiment's final engagement.

== Mustering out ==
On August 1, 1863, the regiment returned to Baton Rouge and boarded the steamship Temple and traveled up the Mississippi River to Cairo, Illinois. From there, they traveled by railroad to Pittsfield, arriving on August 21. They were mustered out on September 1. The total number of deaths consisted of 31 killed in action and mortally wounded and 84 men lost due to disease.

== See also ==
- Massachusetts in the Civil War
- List of Massachusetts Civil War units
