= Felecia M. Nave =

American chemical engineer and academic administrator

Felicia Nave
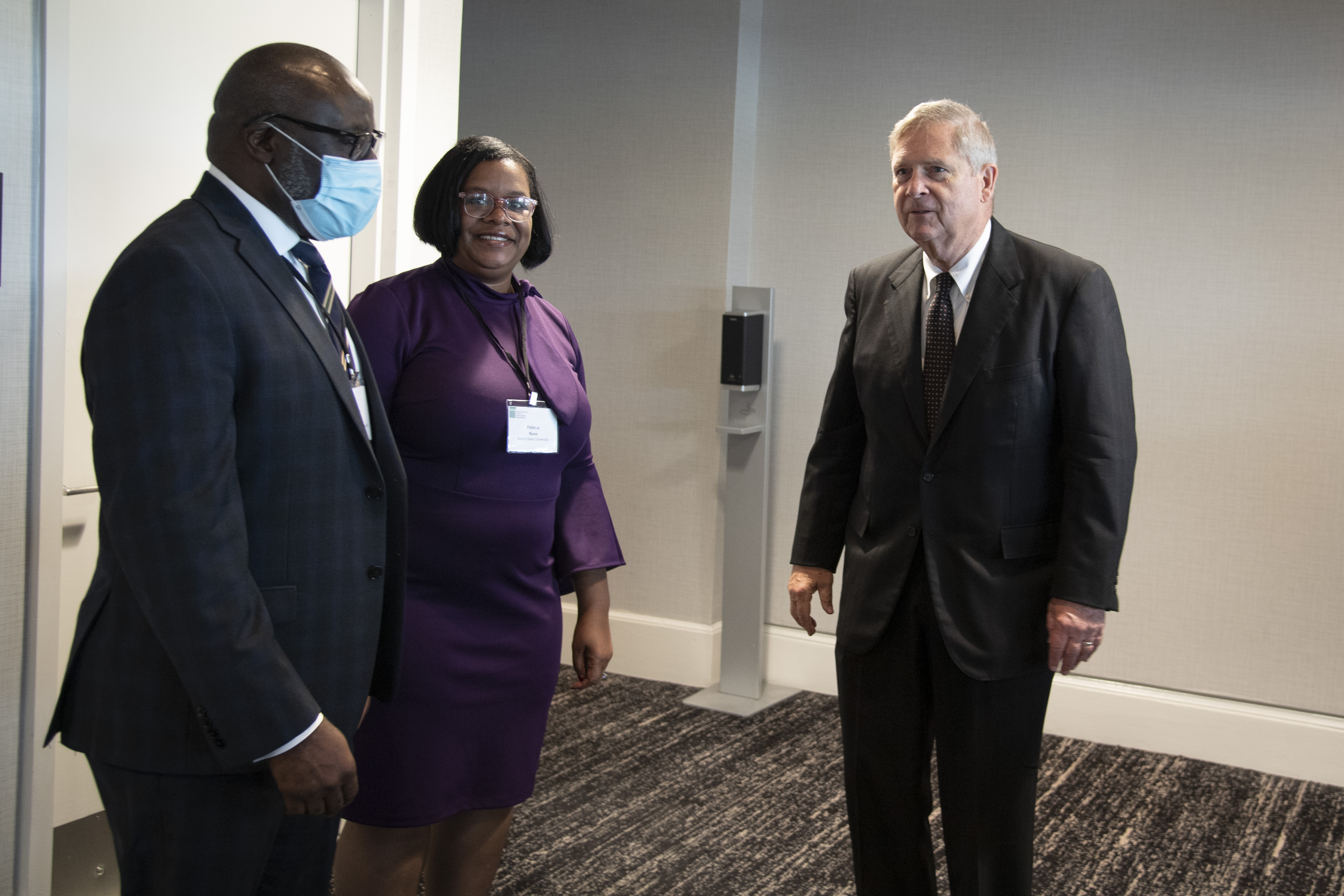

20th president of Alcorn State University
- Incumbent
- Assumed office July 1, 2019
- Preceded by: Alfred Rankins

Personal details
- Born: Felecia Diane McInnis Prentiss, Mississippi, U.S.
- Education: Alcorn State University (BS); University of Toledo (MS, PhD)

Felecia Diane McInnis Nave is an American chemical engineer and academic administrator. She was the 20th president of Alcorn State University and the first female to serve in the position.

== Early life and education ==
Nave is a native of Prentiss, Mississippi. She earned a Bachelor of Science in chemistry from Alcorn State University, graduating cum laude in 1996. She earned a Master of Science in chemical and environmental engineering from University of Toledo. Nave also completed a PhD in engineering at the University of Toledo in 2005. Her dissertation was titled Impact of Mobile Phase Parameters on the Transport Properties of Proteins in Immobilized Metal Affinity Hydrogel Membranes. Maria R. Coleman was her doctoral advisor.

== Career ==
Nave served on the faculty and served in administrative roles at Prairie View A&M University from 2003 to 2018. As provost at PVAMU, she guided the university's expansion both globally and locally. Nave spearheaded projects that involved new degree development, faculty and student development, diversity and inclusion, intensification of PVAMU's research efforts and strengthening the university's focus on STEM fields.

Nave was the provost and vice chancellor of academic affairs at North Carolina Central University. On July 1, 2019, Nave succeeded Alfred Rankins as president of Alcorn State University. Her formal inauguration occurred on April 16, 2021. Nave is the 20th president and first woman to serve in the role.

== Personal life ==
Nave and her husband, Tracie Nave, have four children.

== Awards and honors ==
In 2008, Nave won Prairie View A&M University College of Engineering Outstanding Service Award. In the same year, she was also invited to the Louis Stokes Council of Opportunity in Education Policy Summit at Washington DC. In 2009, Nave received the Prairie View A&M University Student Organization Advisor of the Year. She was also nominated for the National Society of Women Engineers Faculty Advisor Award. In 2013, she was selected as Diverse Issues Emerging Scholars Under 40. In 2015, Nave was the recipient of Top 30 Influential Women of Houston Award. She received the AICHE MAC Eminent Scholars Award in 2017, and University of Toledo Department of Chemical Engineering Outstanding Alumna Award in 2019.

== See also ==
- List of women presidents or chancellors of co-ed colleges and universities
