= Battle of Plains Store =

1863 battle of the American Civil War in East Baton Rouge Parish, Louisiana

Coordinates: 30.69°N 91.206°W

- Part of the American Civil War
Date	May 21, 1863
Location	East Baton Rouge Parish, Louisiana
Result	Union victory

Belligerents
United States (Union)	(Confederate States of America) CSA (Confederacy)

Commanders and leaders
Christopher C. Augur	Frank P. Powers; William R. Miles

Units involved
Augur's division	Port Hudson garrison

Strength
3,500 men	1,000 men

The Battle of Plains Store was fought on May 21, 1863, in East Baton Rouge Parish, Louisiana, during the campaign to capture Port Hudson in the American Civil War. Union troops advancing from Baton Rouge, Louisiana clashed with 600 Confederates at a road junction. The initial Confederate force withdrew, but 400 more Confederates arrived from Port Hudson. Some of the Confederate reinforcement overran Union artillery and routed a Union regiment, but were unable to capture the guns. Union reinforcements advanced to the front, attacked part of the Confederate force and drove them from the field. The Confederates withdrew to Port Hudson, which was almost entirely surrounded by Union troops the next day. Port Hudson was under siege until the defenders surrendered on July 9.

== Background ==
By 1863, during the American Civil War, the Confederate strongholds at Port Hudson, Louisiana, and Vicksburg, Mississippi, allowed for Confederate control of the Mississippi River between the two points. Supplies could cross the river from one half of the Confederacy to the other. Union forces placed Vicksburg under siege in May 1863. Other Union troops commanded by Major General Nathaniel Banks had been moving towards Shreveport, Louisiana, but instead turned towards Port Hudson to capture it. Banks's goal was to defeat the Confederate force there led by Major General Franklin Gardner and then drive north to aid the attack on Vicksburg. In support of Banks, a Union division led by Major General Christopher C. Augur left Baton Rouge, Louisiana, and moved north towards Port Hudson on May 20 with 3,500 men. Like much of Banks' army, Augur's troops were relatively inexperienced and Plains Store would be the first time his regiments saw combat.

== Battle ==
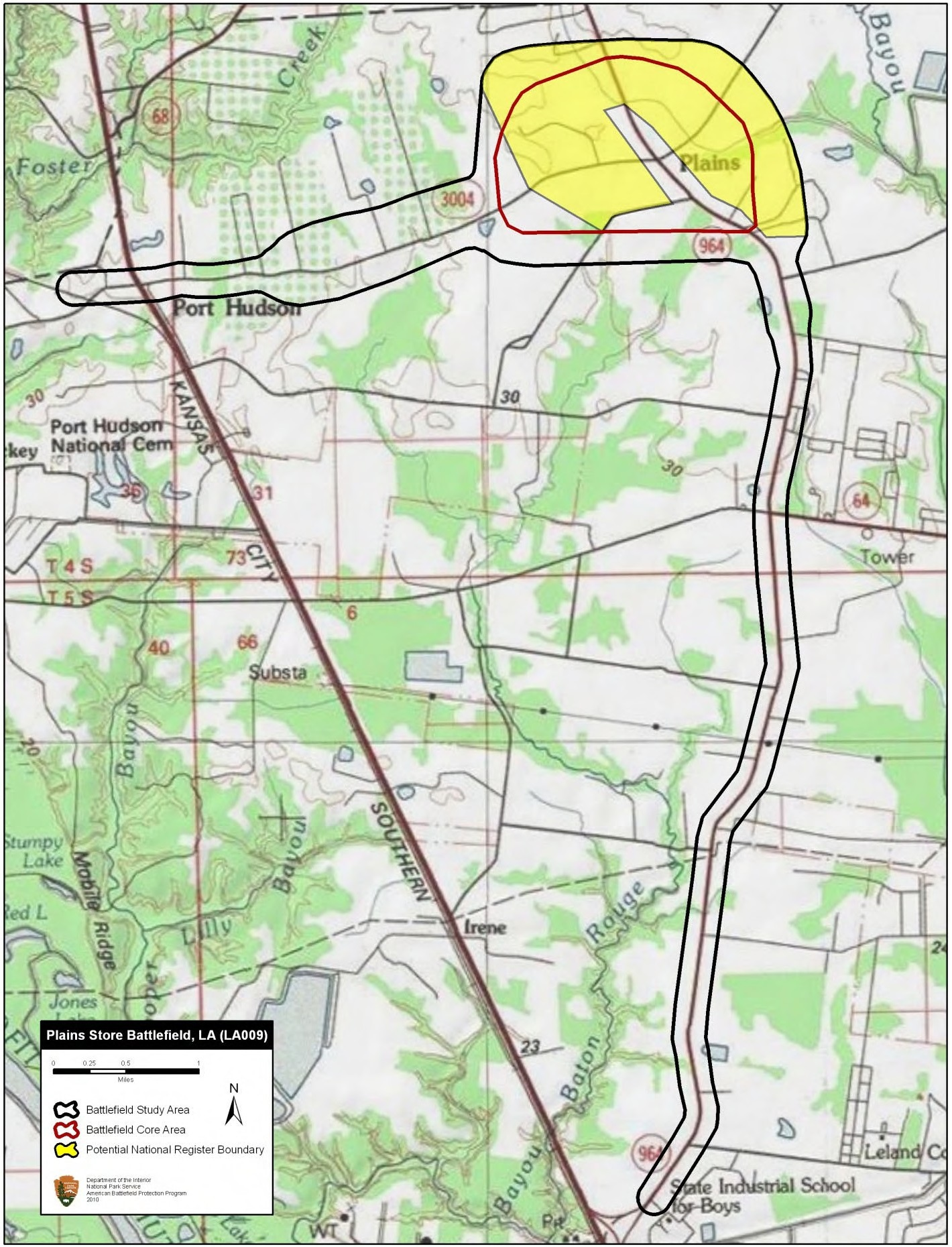
Map of Plains Store Battlefield core and study areas by the American Battlefield Protection Program.

On the morning of May 21, Augur's leading forces, commanded by Colonel Benjamin H. Grierson, met Confederate troops near the junction of the Plains Store and Bayou Sara roads. Plains Store itself was located here. Taking the junction would secure a landing point for Banks and allow the two Union forces to join. The crossroads was defended by 600 men commanded by Colonel Frank P. Powers; Powers's force consisted of part of the 14th Arkansas Infantry Regiment (Powers'), a cavalry force, and Abbay's Mississippi Battery. Skirmishing continued while the main Union force arrived. As Confederate artillery fire prevented a Union advance, Union artillery was brought up at around 10:00 am and an artillery duel began. The Union artillery, consisting of the 5th U.S. Artillery, Battery G and part of the 18th New York Battery, were initially unable to suppress the Confederate fire. Colonel N. A. M. Dudley then ordered the New York battery to withdraw, and replaced it with the 2nd Vermont Battery. Dudley also sent infantrymen forward to skirmish with the Confederates. Powers was outnumbered by the Union force. Around noon, Gardner sent Colonel William R. Miles with 400 infantrymen (known as Miles' Legion) and Boone's Louisiana Battery to support Powers.

Before Miles arrived, Powers ran low on ammunition and withdrew from the field. Dudley's men occupied the junction after the Confederate withdrawal. Some Union artillery and the 48th Massachusetts Infantry Regiment was advanced up the road to Port Hudson, with the rest of the Union force remaining back around Plains Store. Miles had advanced through the woods and was not noticed by the Union troops. He divided his force into two wings: Major James T. Coleman took two companies to the right, and Lieutenant Colonel F. B. Brand took three companies to the left. Coleman's men came under fire from the advanced Union artillery. Attacking the guns, Coleman's troops overran them and routed the 48th Massachusetts. The Confederates were unable to take the cannons from the field because the battery horses had been killed.

When the firing started, two Union regiments – the 116th New York Infantry Regiment and the 49th Massachusetts Infantry Regiment – were sent forward in support. The 49th Massachusetts engaged Coleman's men, and while Confederate artillery fire forced them to take cover, Coleman did not have enough men to attack. Brand was able to outflank the 116th New York, but the New Yorkers turned to face the Confederates and then charged them, driving them from the field. The Confederates withdrew to Port Hudson.

== Aftermath ==
Historian John D. Winters states that the Confederates suffered 89 men killed, wounded, or missing, and the Union 100. Miles's official report noted 89 casualties of all types, although he noted that the exact breakdown of killed and wounded was unknown. Historian Russell W. Blount states that the Confederates lost 12 men killed to the Union's 15 and that the wounded for both sides totaled over 100, primarily Union soldiers. An official Union postbattle report claimed that Augur lost about 150 men to all causes. Blount, summarizing the battle, states that "nothing was accomplished [...] except the shedding of the first blood" in the Port Hudson campaign.

During the battle, Gardner was ordered by Confederate General Joseph E. Johnston to abandon Port Hudson, but Gardner instead obeyed orders from Confederate President Jefferson Davis and remained in his position, requesting reinforcements. On May 22, Banks landed troops at Bayou Sara and pushed forward, having heard that Augur had met resistance. More Union troops arrived from New Orleans, Louisiana, and by the end of the day, Port Hudson was almost completely surrounded. Johnston again ordered Gardner to withdraw the next day, but by that point the Confederates in Port Hudson were cut off. The Siege of Port Hudson began in which the Confederates were reduced to eating rats and mules. Gardner surrendered on July 9, five days after Vicksburg fell.

=== Union casualties ===
Union casualties for the Battle of Plains Store from the Official Records
Unit	Killed	Wounded	Missing	Casualties
2nd Louisiana Infantry Regiment	2	11	1	14
30th Massachusetts Infantry Regiment	0	4	0	4
48th Massachusetts Infantry Regiment	2	7	11	20
49th Massachusetts Infantry Regiment	0	5	1	6
116th New York Infantry Regiment	11	44	1	56
Totals	15	71	14	100

== Sources ==
- Bergeron, Arthur W. (1996) [1989]. Guide to Louisiana Confederate Military Units, 1861–1865 (Louisiana Paperback ed.). Baton Rouge, Louisiana: Louisiana State University. ISBN 0-8071-2102-9.
- Blount, Russell W. (2021). The Longest Siege: Port Hudson, Louisiana, 1863. Jefferson, North Carolina: McFarland & Co. ISBN 978-1-4766-8411-6.
- Hewitt, Lawrence L. (1987). Port Hudson, Confederate Bastion on the Mississippi. Baton Rouge, Louisiana: Louisiana State University Press. ISBN 0-8071-1351-4.
- Kennedy, Frances H., ed. (1998). The Civil War Battlefield Guide (2nd ed.). Boston/New York: Houghton Mifflin. ISBN 978-0-395-74012-5.
- The War of the Rebellion: A Compilation of the Official Records of the Union and Confederate Armies. Vol. 26. Washington, D.C.: United States Government Printing Office. 1889. OCLC 262466842.
- Winters, John D. (1991) [1963]. The Civil War in Louisiana. Baton Rouge, Louisiana: Louisiana State University Press. ISBN 0-8071-1725-0.
