= Siege of Vicksburg order of battle: Confederate =

The following Confederate States Army units and commanders fought in the Siege of Vicksburg of the American Civil War. The Union order of battle is listed separately. Order of battle compiled from the army organization during the campaign.

== Abbreviations used ==
=== Military Officer Rank ===
- LTG = Lieutenant General
- MG = Major General
- BG = Brigadier General
- Col = Colonel
- Ltc = Lieutenant Colonel
- Maj = Major
- Cpt = Captain
- Lt = Lieutenant

=== Other ===
- w = wounded
- mw = mortally wounded
- k = killed

== Department of Mississippi and East Louisiana ==
=== Army of Vicksburg ===
LTG John C. Pemberton, Commanding

Division	Brigade	Regiments and Others
Stevenson's Division MG Carter L. Stevenson	1st Brigade BG Seth M. Barton	40th Georgia: Ltc Robert M. Young; 41st Georgia: Col William E. Curtiss; 42nd Georgia: Col Robert J. Henderson; 43rd Georgia: Col Skidmore Harris (k), Cpt Mathadeas M. Grantham; 52nd Georgia: Maj John Jay Moore; Pettus Flying (Mississippi) Artillery: Lt Milton H. Trantham; Pointe Coupee (Louisiana) Artillery Co A (section/2 guns): Lt John Yoist; Pointe Coupee (Louisiana) Artillery, Co C (4 guns): Cpt Alexander Chust
Stevenson's Division MG Carter L. Stevenson	2nd Brigade BG Alfred Cumming	34th Georgia: Col James A. W. Johnson; 36th Georgia: Maj Charles E. Broyles; 39th Georgia: Ltc Joseph F. B. Jackson; 56th Georgia: Ltc John T. Slaughter; 57th Georgia: Col William Barkuloo; Cherokee (Georgia) Artillery: Cpt Max van den Corput
Stevenson's Division MG Carter L. Stevenson	3rd Brigade BG Stephen D. Lee	20th Alabama: Col Isham W. Garrott (k), Col Edmund W. Pettus; 23rd Alabama: Col Franklin K. Beck; 30th Alabama: Cpt John C. Francis; 31st Alabama: Ltc Thomas M. Arrington; 46th Alabama: Cpt George E. Brewer; Alabama Battery: Cpt James F. Waddell
Stevenson's Division MG Carter L. Stevenson	4th Brigade Col Alexander W. Reynolds	3rd Tennessee (Provisional Army): Col Newton J. Lillard; 39th Tennessee: Col William M. Bradford; 43rd Tennessee: Col James W. Gillespie; 59th Tennessee: Col William L. Eakin; 3rd Maryland Battery: Cpt John B. Rowan
Stevenson's Division MG Carter L. Stevenson	Waul's Texas Legion Col Thomas Neville Waul	1st Battalion (Infantry): Maj Eugene S. Bolling; 2nd Battalion (Infantry): Ltc James Wrigley; Cavalry Battalion: Lt Thomas J. Cleveland; Artillery Company: Cpt John Q. Wall
Stevenson's Division MG Carter L. Stevenson	Attached	1st (Carter's) Tennessee Cavalry, Company C: Cpt Richard S. Vandyke; Botetourt (Virginia) Artillery: Lt James P. Wright; Signal Corps: Lt C. H. Barrot
Forney's Division MG John H. Forney	Hebert's Brigade BG Louis Hébert	3rd Louisiana: Maj David Pierson; 21st (ex-22nd) Louisiana: Ltc John T. Plattsmier; 36th Mississippi: Col William W. Witherspoon; 37th Mississippi: Col Orlando S. Holland; 38th Mississippi: Cpt Daniel B. Seal; 43rd Mississippi: Col Richard Harrison; 7th Mississippi Battalion: Cpt Alney M. Dozier; 2nd Alabama Artillery Battalion, Company C: Lt John R. Sclater; Appeal (Arkansas) Battery: Lt Robert N. Cotten
Forney's Division MG John H. Forney	Moore's Brigade BG John C. Moore	37th Alabama: Col James F. Dowdell; 40th Alabama: Col John H. Higley; 42nd Alabama: Col John W. Portis; 1st Mississippi Light Artillery (6 companies): Col William T. Withers; 35th Mississippi: Ltc Charles R. Jordan; 40th Mississippi: Col Wallace B. Colbert; 2nd Texas: Col Ashbel Smith; Co. D, 2nd Alabama Light Artillery Battalion: Cpt. Henry H. Sengstak; Pointe Coupee (Louisiana) Artillery, Company B: Cpt William A. Davidson
Smith's Division MG Martin L. Smith	Baldwin's Brigade BG William E. Baldwin	17th Louisiana: Col Robert Richardson; 31st Louisiana: Ltc James W. Draughon; 4th Mississippi: Cpt Thomas P. Nelson; 46th Mississippi: Col Claudius W. Sears; Memphis Light (Tennessee) Artillery: Cpt Thomas F. Tobin
Smith's Division MG Martin L. Smith	Vaughn's Brigade BG John C. Vaughn	60th Tennessee: Cpt Jonathan W. Bachman; 61st Tennessee: Ltc James G. Rose; 62nd Tennessee: Col John A. Rowan
Smith's Division MG Martin L. Smith	Shoup's Brigade BG Francis A. Shoup	26th Louisiana: Ltc William C. Crow; 27th Louisiana: Cpt Joseph T. Hatch; 29th Louisiana: Col Allen Thomas; McNally's (Arkansas) Battery: Cpt Francis McNally
Smith's Division MG Martin L. Smith	Mississippi State Troops BG Jeptha V. Harris	5th Regiment: Col Henry C. Robinson; 3rd Battalion: Ltc Thomas A. Burgin
Smith's Division MG Martin L. Smith	Attached	14th Mississippi Light Artillery Battalion: Maj Matthew S. Ward; Mississippi Partisan Rangers: Cpt James S. Smyth; Signal Corps: Cpt Max. T. Davidson
Bowen's Division MG John S. Bowen	1st (Missouri) Brigade Col Francis Cockrell	1st and 4th Missouri: Col Amos C. Riley; 2nd Missouri: Maj Thomas M. Carter; 3rd Missouri: Maj James K. McDowell; 5th Missouri: Col James McCown; 6th Missouri: Maj Stephen Cooper; Guibor's (Missouri) Battery: Lt Cornelius Heffernan; Landis's Missouri Battery: Lt John M. Langan; Wade's (Missouri) Battery: Lt Richard C. Walsh
Bowen's Division MG John S. Bowen	2nd Brigade BG Martin E. Green (k); Col Thomas P. Dockery	15th Arkansas: Cpt Caleb Davis; 19th Arkansas: Col Thomas P. Dockery, Cpt James K. Norwood; 20th Arkansas: Col Daniel W. Jones; 21st Arkansas: Cpt Augustus Tyler; 1st (Stirman's) Arkansas Cavalry Battalion: Cpt John J. Clark; 12th Arkansas Battalion (sharpshooters): Lt John S. Bell; 1st Missouri Cavalry (dismounted): Maj William C. Parker; 3rd Missouri Cavalry (dismounted): Cpt Felix Lotspeich; 3rd Missouri Light Battery: Cpt William E. Dawson; Lowe's (Missouri) Battery: Lt Thomas B. Catron
Artillery	River Batteries Col Edward Higgins	1st Louisiana Heavy Artillery (8 companies): Ltc Daniel Beltzhoover; 8th Louisiana Heavy Artillery Battalion (3 companies): Maj Frederick N. Ogden; 22nd (ex-23rd) Louisiana (4 companies): Cpt Samuel Jones; 1st Tennessee Heavy Artillery (4 companies): Col Andrew Jackson, Jr.; Tennessee Battery: Cpt J.B. Caruthers; Tennessee Battery: Cpt Thomas N. Johnston; Tennessee Battery: Cpt J. Peyton Lynch; Vaiden (Mississippi) Battery (1st Mississippi Artillery, Battery L): Cpt Samuel C. Bains
	Miscellaneous	54th Alabama (detachment): Lt Joel P. Abney; City Guards: Cpt E.B. Martin; Signal Corps: Cpt C.A. King
