= Battle of Chickasaw Bayou order of battle: Confederate =

The following Confederate Army units and commanders fought in the Battle of Chickasaw Bayou of the American Civil War. The Union order of battle is listed separately.

== Abbreviations used ==
=== Military rank ===
- LTG = Lieutenant General
- MG = Major General
- BG = Brigadier General
- Col = Colonel
- Ltc = Lieutenant Colonel
- Maj = Major
- Cpt = Captain
- Lt = 1st Lieutenant

=== Other ===
- w = wounded

== Department of Mississippi and East Louisiana ==
LTG John C. Pemberton

Division	Brigade	Regiments and Others
Second Military District; MG Martin Luther Smith	Barton's Brigade BG Seth Barton	40th Georgia: Col Abda Johnson (w); 42nd Georgia: Col Robert J. Henderson; 43rd Georgia: Ltc Hiram P. Bell (w); 52nd Georgia: Col Charles D. Phillips
Second Military District; MG Martin Luther Smith	Vaughn's Brigade BG John C. Vaughn	60th Tennessee: Col John H. Crawford; 61st Tennessee: Col John A. Rowan; 62nd Tennessee:
Second Military District; MG Martin Luther Smith	Gregg's Brigade BG John Gregg	1st Tennessee: 3rd Tennessee: Col Calvin J. Clack; 10th Tennessee: 30th Tennessee: Col James J. Turner; 41st Tennessee: 50th Tennessee: 51st Tennessee:
Provisional Division; BG Stephen Dill Lee; MG Dabney Herndon Maury	Provisional Brigade Col William T. Withers	17th Louisiana: Col Robert Richardson; 26th Louisiana: Col Winchester Hall; 30th Mississippi; 46th Mississippi (detachment): 1st Mississippi Light Artillery: Maj Matthew S. Ward
Provisional Division; BG Stephen Dill Lee; MG Dabney Herndon Maury	Provisional Brigade Col Allen Thomas	29th Louisiana: Ltc J. Octave Landry; 46th Mississippi: Ltc William K. Easterling
Provisional Division; BG Stephen Dill Lee; MG Dabney Herndon Maury	Provisional Brigade Col Edward Higgins	22nd Louisiana: Col Edward Higgins
Provisional Division; BG Stephen Dill Lee; MG Dabney Herndon Maury	Note: Unit organization into the three provisional brigades is mostly unclear.	37th Alabama: 40th Alabama: Col Augustus A. Coleman; 1st Louisiana: Col Samuel R. Harrison; 31st Louisiana: Col Charles H. Morrison; 3rd Battalion Mississippi State Troops: 3rd Mississippi; 4th Mississippi: Col Pierre S. Layton; 35th Mississippi; Mississippi Battery: Cpt Robert Bowman; Mississippi Battery (section): Lt Frank Johnston; Mississippi Battery: Cpt Newit J. Drew, Lt W. J. Duncan; 2nd Texas Cavalry: Ltc William C. Timmins (w); Johnson's (Mississippi) Company Cavalry: Hill's (Mississippi) Company Cavalry:

== See also ==
- Mississippi in the American Civil War
