= 12th Louisiana Infantry Regiment =

Infantry regiment of the Confederate States Army

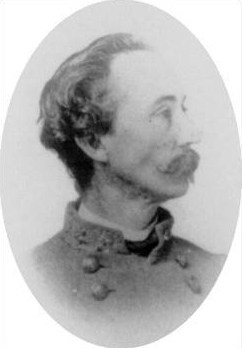
- Thomas M. Scott was the regiment's first colonel.
- Active: 11 May 1861 – 26 April 1865
- Country: Confederate States of America
- Allegiance: Confederate States of America, Louisiana
- Branch: Confederate States Army
- Type: Infantry
- Size: Regiment (704 men, Aug. 1861)
- Part of: Villepigue's, Buford's, Scott's Brigade
- Engagements: American Civil War; Battle of Island Number Ten (1862); Second Battle of Corinth (1862); Battle of Champion Hill (1863); Siege of Vicksburg (1863); Jackson Expedition (1863); Meridian campaign (1864); Battle of Resaca (1864); Battle of Peachtree Creek (1864); Battle of Atlanta (1864); Battle of Franklin (1864); Battle of Nashville (1864); Battle of Bentonville (1865)

Commanders
- Notable commanders: Thomas M. Scott; Noel L. Nelson †; Thomas C. Standifer

The 12th Louisiana Infantry Regiment was a unit of volunteers recruited in Louisiana that fought in the Confederate States Army during the American Civil War. Formed in August 1861, the regiment served in the Western Theater of the American Civil War and was unique in that there were 12 companies. The regiment garrisoned Island Number Ten before being stationed at Fort Pillow. It fought at Second Corinth in 1862 and Champion Hill and Jackson in 1863. A detachment served during the Siege of Vicksburg and was captured. In 1864, the regiment fought in the Meridian, Atlanta, and Franklin–Nashville campaigns, suffering heavy losses at Peachtree Creek and Franklin. It fought at Bentonville in 1865 before surrendering with General Joseph E. Johnston.

== Formation ==
The 12th Louisiana Infantry Regiment organized at Camp Moore on 13 August 1861 with 704 recruits. It was the only Louisiana regiment with 12 companies, named A–M, excluding J. The original field officers were Colonel Thomas M. Scott, Lieutenant Colonel Wade H. Hough, and Major John C. Knott. Hough resigned on 4 May 1862 and was replaced as lieutenant colonel by James A. Boyd. When the regiment elected new officers on 11 May 1862, Knott was dropped and replaced as Major by Noel L. Nelson. When Boyd resigned on 5 January 1863, Nelson became lieutenant colonel and Thomas C. Standifer became major. On 1 August 1862, the original Company M was consolidated with Company C. A new company M was created by transferring Company K from the 9th Louisiana Infantry Regiment in October 1862.

Company information for the 12th Louisiana Infantry Regiment
| Company | Nickname | Captains | Recruitment Parish |
|---|---|---|---|
| A | North Louisiana Cadets | John T. Jordan (r) | DeSoto |
| B | Arcadia Invincibles | Thomas C. Standifer (p); Joseph A. Bivin (k-Peachtree Creek); Jonathan Anders | Bienville |
| C | Southern Sentinels | John A. Dixon (p); Angus C. Alexander | Winn |
| D | Beauregard Fencibles | Henry V. McCain (p) | Winn |
| E | Independent Rangers | D. L. Hicks (u); Evander M. Graham (p) | Union |
| F | Morehouse Stars | James H. Stevens (r); Christopher C. Davenport (r); William N. Potts | Morehouse |
| G | no name | Thomas J. Hightower (r); Thomas Price | Claiborne |
| H | Jackson Sharpshooters | James H. Seale (r); James T. Davis | Jackson |
| I | Farmer Guards | Charles W. Hodge (r); John E. Woodward (r); John W. McBride | Union |
| K | Caldwell Invincibles | James A. Boyd (p); Jones Meredith (r); Andrew J. Braden | Caldwell |
| L | Claiborne Guards | Isaac L. Leonard (r); Noel L. Nelson (p); Robert A. Crow (d); Benjamin F. Hargrove (z); James J. Crow | Claiborne |
| M (#1) | Farmer Rangers | Banajah D. Owen (x); Angus C. Alexander | Natchitoches |
| M (#2) | Jackson Greys | George W. McCranie (r); Joseph L. Bond | Jackson |

- Key: d = died, k = killed, p = promoted, r = resigned, u = unknown, x = dropped on 11 May 1862, z = demoted.

== Service ==
=== 1861–1862 ===
In late 1861, the 12th Louisiana Infantry Regiment garrisoned Columbus, Kentucky. On 7 November 1861, the regiment was sent to the west bank of the Mississippi River to help in the Battle of Belmont but by the time it arrived, the fighting had ended. After Columbus was abandoned, the regiment went to garrison New Madrid, Missouri. On 17 March 1862 during the Battle of Island Number Ten, the regiment was withdrawn to garrison Fort Pillow and avoided being captured when Island Number Ten surrendered. At Fort Pillow the soldiers endured a 6-week bombardment by the Union river fleet before evacuating the fort and marching to Grenada, Mississippi. The regiment also guarded Holly Springs, Mississippi, and Port Hudson, Louisiana, before returning to Grenada.

The 12th Louisiana Infantry fought at the Second Battle of Corinth on 3–4 October 1862. Though the regiment is omitted from the Battles and Leaders order of battle, Historian Timothy B. Smith stated that the 12th Louisiana Infantry was assigned to Brigadier General John Bordenave Villepigue's 2nd Brigade in Major General Mansfield Lovell's division. The other units in the brigade were the 33rd and 39th Mississippi Infantry Regiments, the 1st Confederate Infantry and the 2nd Louisiana Zouave Battalions, and McClung's Tennessee Battery. In the battle, Villepigue's brigade sustained losses of 21 killed, 76 wounded, and 71 missing. On 4 October, Major General Earl Van Dorn ordered Lovell's division to attack, but inexplicably Lovell failed to do so. Meanwhile, Major General Sterling Price's two divisions attacked and suffered terrible losses. When Van Dorn ordered Lovell to cover the retreat with his strongest brigade, Villepigue's brigade was sent. Thinking that they were about to be attacked again, the Union forces did not pursue the defeated Confederates.

=== 1863–1865 ===
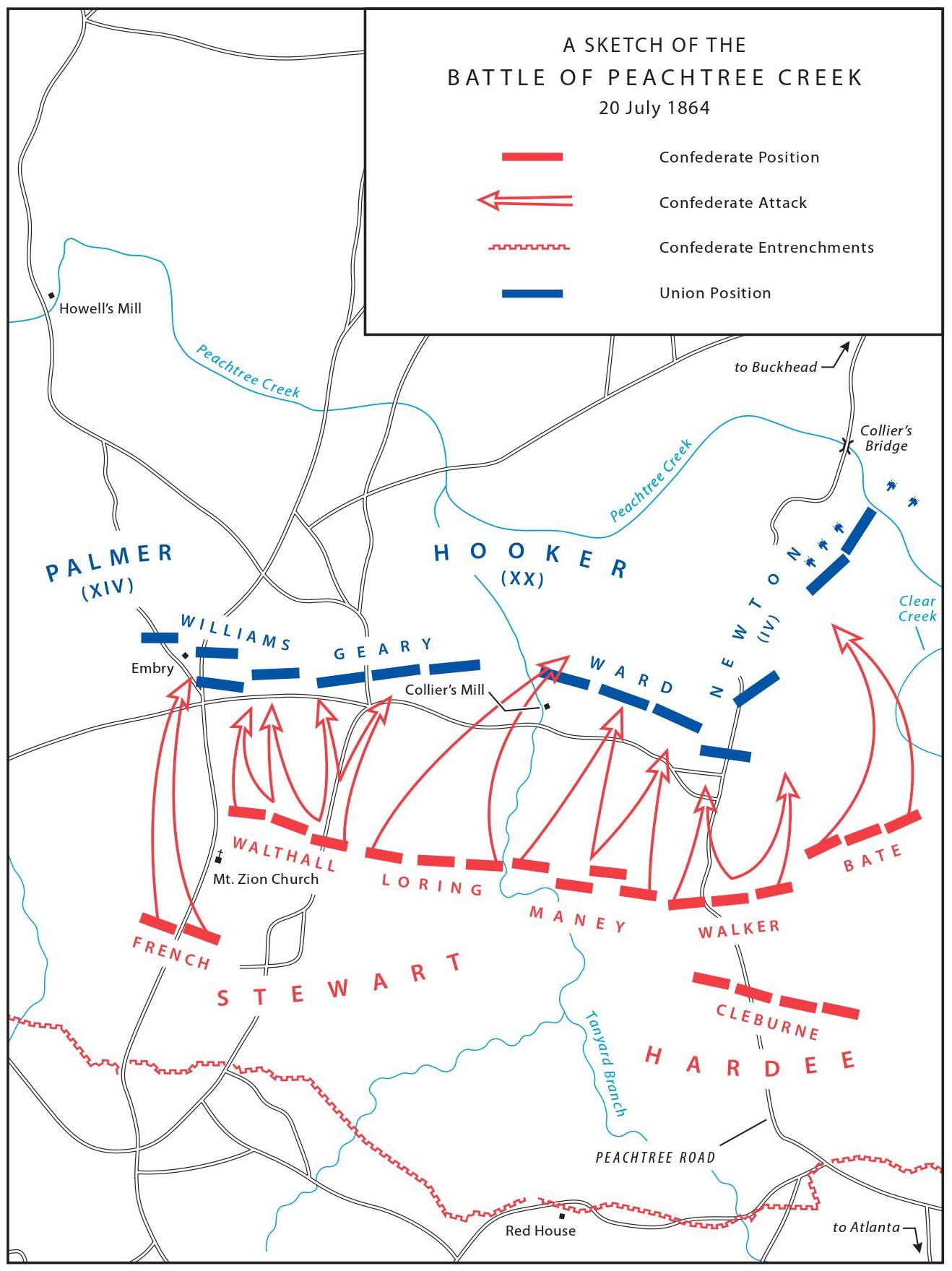
Battle of Peachtree Creek, 20 July 1864

The regiment was posted at Grenada, Holly Springs, and Canton during the winter of 1862–1863. In February 1863, the unit returned to Port Hudson and was there when the Union Navy attacked the place on 14 March. The regiment traveled to Atlanta but was ordered back to Mississippi to stop Grierson's Raid, in which it was unsuccessful. In the Battle of Champion Hill on 16 May 1863, the 12th Louisiana Infantry, under the command of Colonel Scott was part of Brigadier General Abraham Buford's brigade, Major General William W. Loring's division, Lieutenant General John C. Pemberton's army. The other units in Buford's brigade were the 27th, 35th, 54th, and 55th Alabama, 9th Arkansas, 3rd Kentucky, and 7th Kentucky Infantry Regiments, and Companies A and C of the Pointe Coupee Artillery. Buford's brigade sustained losses of 11 killed and 49 wounded.

A 160-man detachment from the 12th Louisiana Infantry led by Captain Dixon (Company C) fought in the Siege of Vicksburg (18 May–4 July 1863) as part of Brigadier General John C. Vaughn's brigade. After the surrender, the soldiers were paroled. The regiment fought in the Siege of Jackson on 5–25 July 1863. The regiment camped at Canton and Morton in fall and winter 1863. From 3 February to 5 March 1864, Major General William Tecumseh Sherman and 25,000 Union soldiers took part in the Meridian campaign. Sherman's troops wrecked railroad facilities at Meridian, Mississippi, before returning to Vicksburg. Lieutenant General Leonidas Polk had the infantry divisions of Loring and Major General Samuel Gibbs French but retreated into Alabama without seriously opposing Sherman's advance.

On 10 May 1864, Colonel Scott was promoted to brigadier general. Nelson became colonel commanding the regiment, Standifer received promotion to lieutenant colonel, and Henry V. McCain became major. In May the regiment joined the Army of Tennessee at Resaca, Georgia. At the Battle of Resaca on 14–15 May 1864, Polk's corps consisted of two divisions, which were deployed with Brigadier General James Cantey's on the extreme left flank, near Resaca, and Loring's to Cantey's right. On 19 May, French's division joined Polk's corps. In the Atlanta campaign, the 12th Louisiana Infantry was assigned to Scott's brigade, Loring's division, Polk's corps. The other units in Scott's brigade were the 27th, 35th, 49th, 55th, and 57th Alabama Infantry Regiments.

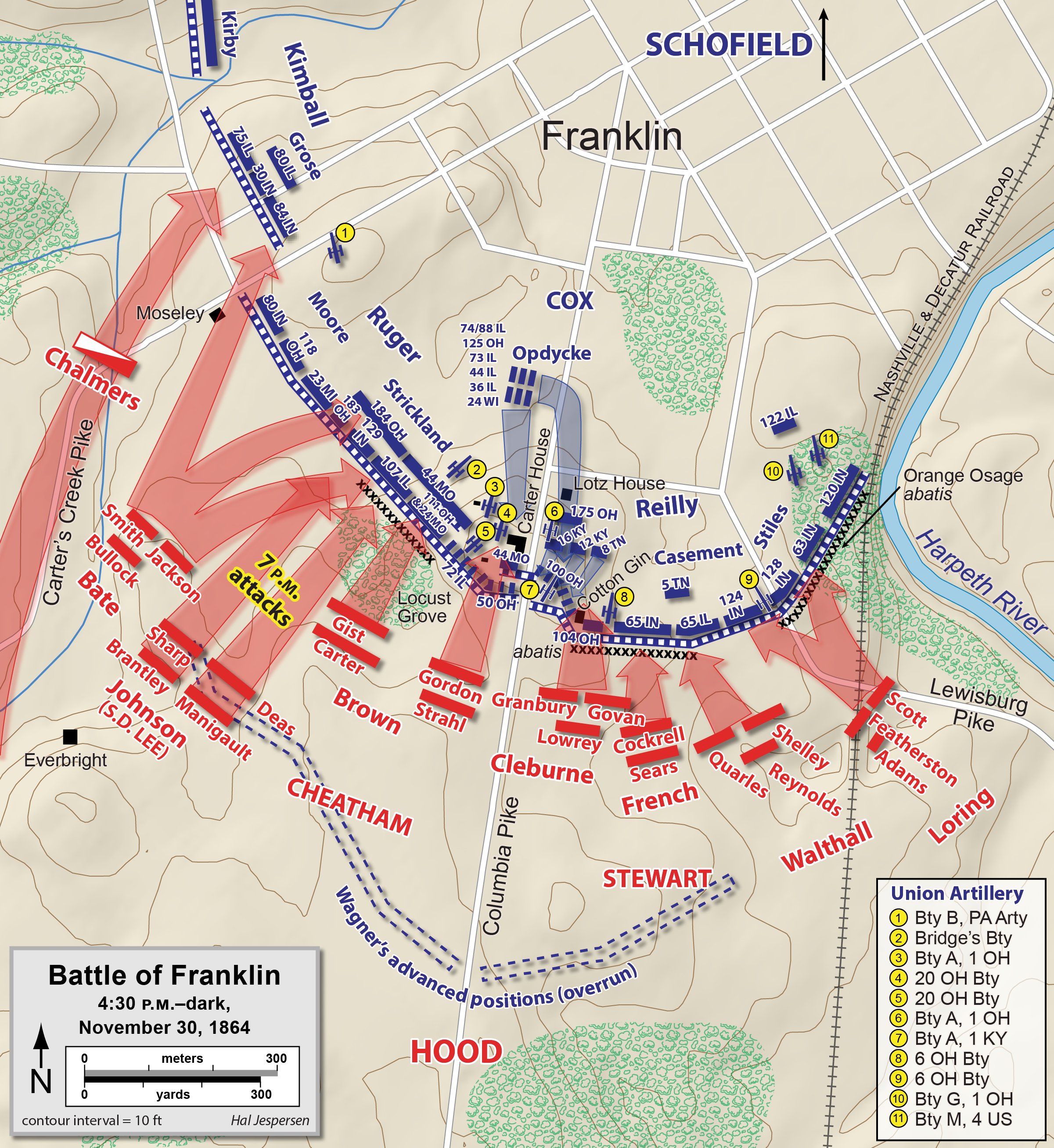
Battle of Franklin, 30 Nov. 1864

At the Battle of Peachtree Creek on 20 July 1864, Scott's brigade attacked Brigadier General John W. Geary's Union division. At the first onset, Scott's men overwhelmed the 33rd New Jersey Infantry Regiment, which was holding an advanced outpost, capturing its flag and many soldiers. Following an unguarded ravine, Scott's troops gained the rear of the Union front line, panicking many soldiers, and overrunning a 4-gun battery. However, Geary's reserve brigade and rallied Federal soldiers counterattacked; they drove Scott's men back after bitter fighting. In the struggle, the 12th Louisiana had its flag captured and suffered a loss of 11 killed, 57 wounded, and 4 missing, including Captain Bivin (B Company) killed. At Peachtree Creek, Scott's brigade was part of Lieutenant General Alexander P. Stewart's corps.

After the fall of Atlanta, the Army of Tennessee embarked on the Franklin–Nashville campaign. At the Battle of Franklin on 30 November 1864, Loring's division deployed on the Confederate right flank with Brigadier General Winfield S. Featherston's brigade on the right and Scott's brigade on the left, with Brigadier General John Adams in reserve. Though the 5,000 Union defenders faced over 10,000 attackers, they were protected by entrenchments. In front of the entrenchments stood a row of osage orange trees that were cut off about 4 ft (1.2 m) from the ground, allowing a clear field of fire above and a nearly impassible barrier close to the ground. Scott's men were hammered by artillery fire and then hit by a tremendous volley of rifle fire at a distance of 75 yd (69 m) before reaching the osage orange barrier. Both of Loring's front-line brigades were repulsed and fled before the searing fire. One survivor called the assault "glorified suicide". Adams' brigade moved to the left where the Confederates had gained a foothold in the Federal works. At Franklin, the 12th Louisiana Infantry lost "nearly 80 men" killed or wounded. The casualties included Colonel Nelson who was hit by several canister shots and taken to the McGavock house which was used as a hospital. In his death throes, Nelson groaned, "My poor wife and child". Nelson died and was replaced as colonel by Standifer, Evander M. Graham became lieutenant colonel, and Henry V. McCain was promoted major.

The regiment fought at the Battle of Nashville on 15–16 December 1864 before retreating to Tupelo, Mississippi. In February 1865, the regiment traveled to North Carolina to join General Joseph E. Johnston's army. It fought at the Battle of Bentonville on 19 March 1865. At Bentonville, the 12th Louisiana Infantry under Lieutenant Colonel Graham was assigned to Brigadier General Robert Lowry's brigade, Loring's division, Stewart's corps. (Note: Captain Dixon was listed as commander of the regiment at Bentonville before being superseded by Graham. At some time after Bentonville, Dixon was promoted major.) Johnston surrendered on 26 April 1865. During the war, a total of 1,457 soldiers enrolled in the 12th Louisiana Infantry. Of these, 304 were killed in battle and 302 died from disease.

== See also ==
- List of Louisiana Confederate Civil War units
- Louisiana in the Civil War

== Notes ==
Footnotes

Citations
