= 23rd Louisiana Infantry Regiment =

Infantry regiment of the Confederate States Army

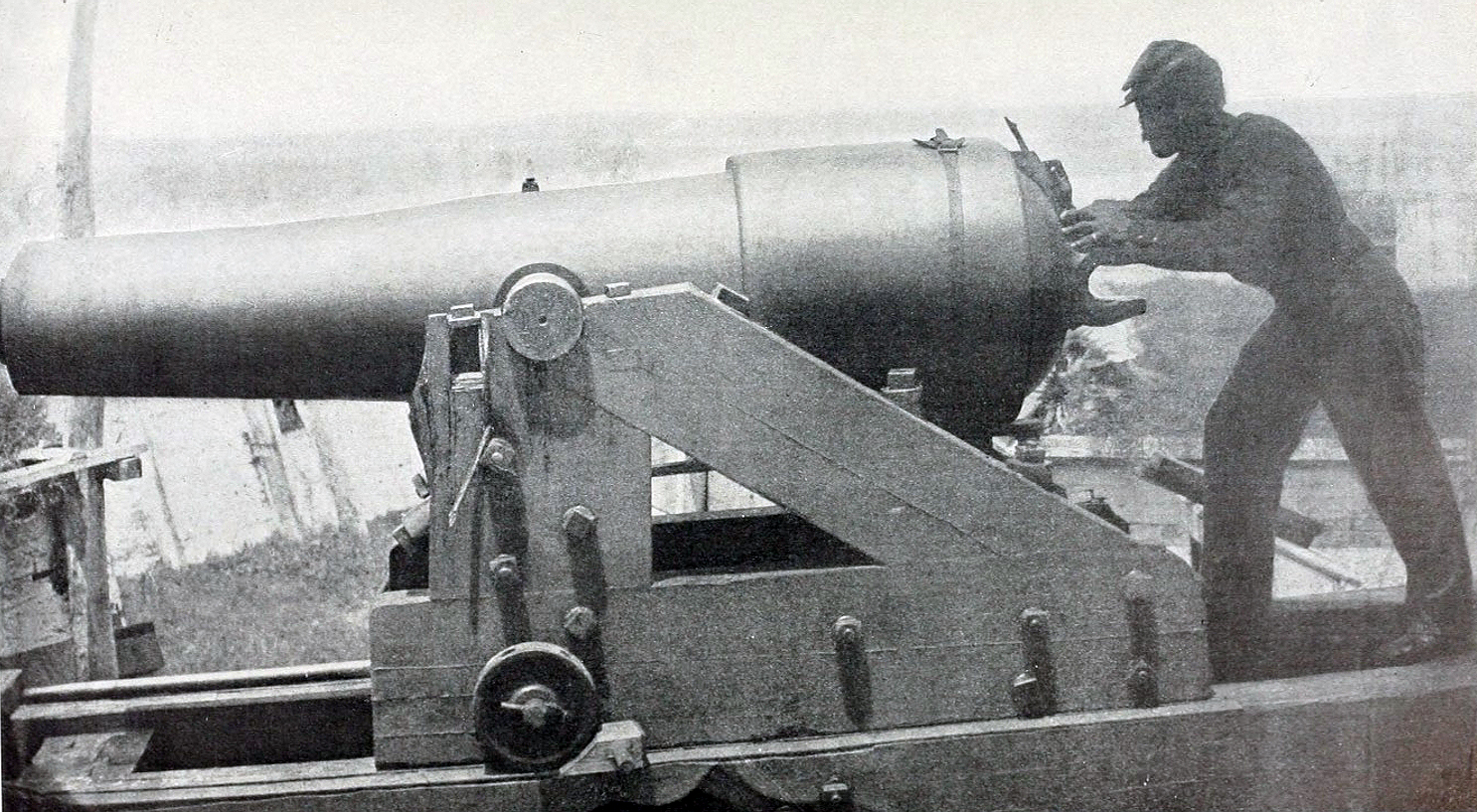
- A siege gun at Vicksburg is similar to the heavy artillery manned by the regiment's soldiers.
- Active: January 1862 – 8 May 1865
- Country: Confederate States of America
- Allegiance: Louisiana
- Branch: Confederate States Army
- Type: Infantry
- Size: Regiment (841 men, Mar. 1862)
- Engagements: American Civil War; Defense of Fort Jackson (1862); Yazoo Pass expedition (1863); Siege of Vicksburg (1863); Battle of Spanish Fort (1865)

Commanders
- Notable commanders: Charles H. Herrick

The 23rd Louisiana Infantry Regiment was a unit of volunteers recruited in Louisiana that fought in the Confederate States Army during the American Civil War. The regiment organized in January 1862 at New Orleans by merging the Orleans Artillery Battalion, a state militia unit, with six independent companies. In March 1862, the unit mustered into Confederate service with 841 men and served during the war in the Western Theater of the American Civil War. The various companies were allocated to defend various forts. One company was assigned to hold Fort Jackson, fought in the Battle of Forts Jackson and St. Philip, and surrendered when the fort fell. After the Capture of New Orleans most of the companies disbanded. However, four companies reorganized at Camp Moore in May 1862 and traveled to Vicksburg, Mississippi where they manned the river batteries. In early 1863, the regiment was renamed the 22nd Louisiana Infantry Regiment. The soldiers went to Fort Pemberton where they helped drive off the Yazoo Pass expedition. The regiment was part of the garrison during the Siege of Vicksburg and was captured and paroled when the city fell in July 1863. The men reported to a parole camp. In January 1864, it and the remnants of six other Louisiana regiments were absorbed into the 22nd Consolidated Louisiana Infantry Regiment. This unit fought at Spanish Fort in March and April 1865 and surrendered at Meridian, Mississippi in May 1865.

== See also ==
- List of Louisiana Confederate Civil War units
- Louisiana in the Civil War
