= Siege of Vicksburg order of battle =

The order of battle for the Siege of Vicksburg includes:

- Siege of Vicksburg order of battle: Confederate
- Siege of Vicksburg order of battle: Union

== See also ==
- Vicksburg campaign
