= Battle of Chickasaw Bayou order of battle =

The order of battle for the Battle of Chickasaw Bayou includes:

- Battle of Chickasaw Bayou order of battle: Confederate
- Battle of Chickasaw Bayou order of battle: Union
