= 2nd Louisiana Field Battery =

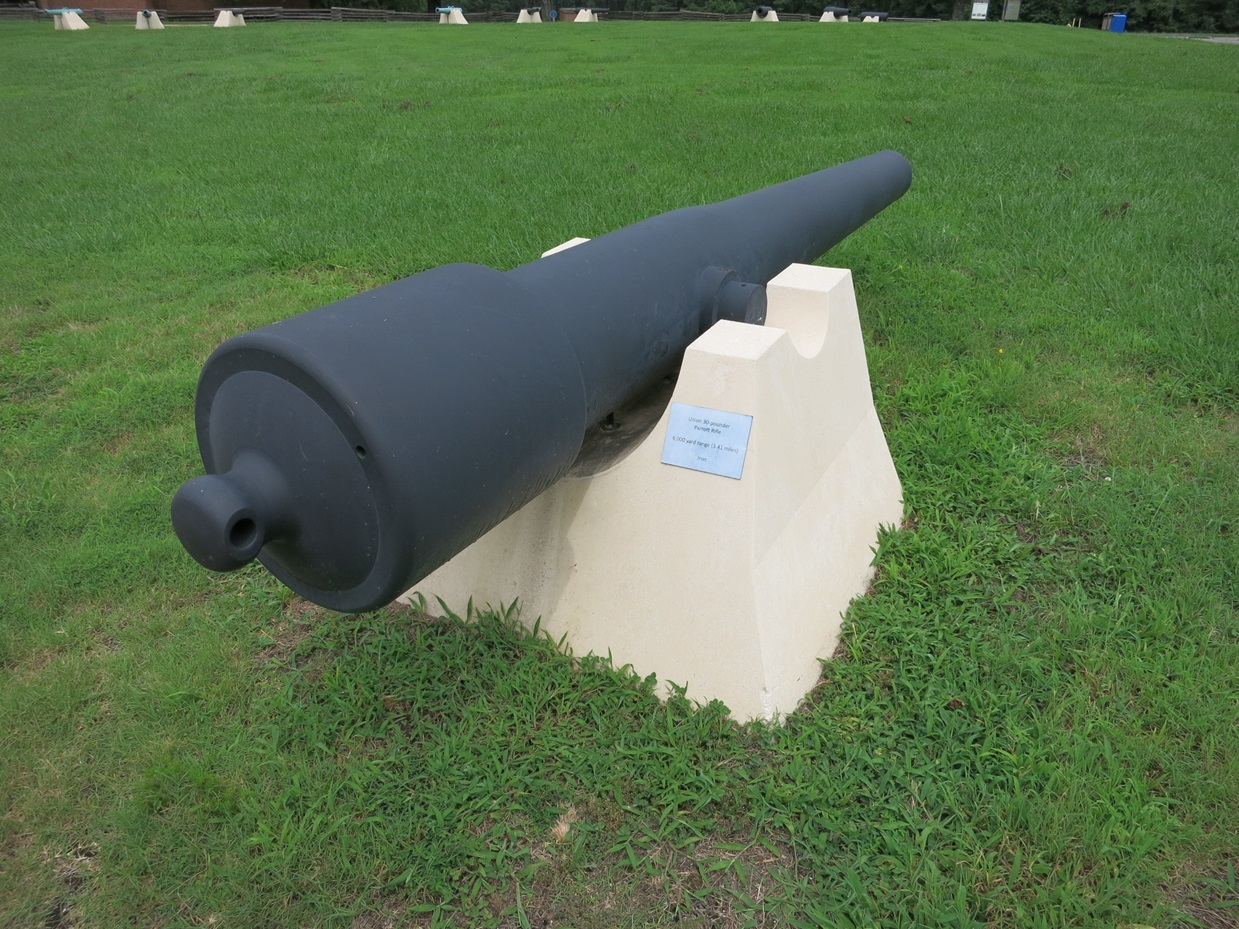
- 30-pounder Parrott rifle is located at Petersburg National Battlefield.
- Active: 1 March 1862 – 2 June 1865
- Country: Confederate States of America
- Allegiance: Confederate States of America; Louisiana
- Branch: Confederate States Army
- Type: Artillery
- Size: Company
- Equipment: 2 x 30-pounder Parrott rifles (May 1864)
- Engagements: American Civil War; Battle of Plains Store (1863); Siege of Port Hudson (1863); Battle of Mansura (1864); Action at Simmesport (1864)

Commanders
- Notable commanders: Richard Boone; Samuel M. Thomas

The 2nd Louisiana Field Battery was an artillery unit recruited from volunteers in Louisiana that fought in the Confederate States Army during the American Civil War. The battery organized on 1 March 1862 at Red River Landing, Louisiana as Company B, of Miles' Legion Artillery. However, the battery usually served independently from Miles' Legion. In 1863, the battery fought at Plains Store and Port Hudson and was captured when the latter place surrendered in July 1863. After a prisoner exchange, the battery reorganized in December 1863. The unit fought at Mansura in May 1864 using two large caliber Parrott rifles captured from Union vessels. In an action at Simmesport in June, one gun was captured and the other gun burst. The last soldiers in the battery received their paroles in early June 1865.

== See also ==
- List of Louisiana Confederate Civil War units
- Louisiana in the Civil War
