= 3rd Louisiana Field Battery =

- Active: April or May 1862 – 2 June 1865
- Country: Confederate States of America
- Allegiance: Confederate States of America; Louisiana
- Branch: Confederate States Army
- Type: Artillery
- Size: Company
- Nickname: Bell Battery
- Engagements: American Civil War; Action at Fort Beauregard (1863); Red River campaign (1864)

Commanders
- Notable commanders: Thomas O. Benton

The 3rd Louisiana Field Battery was an artillery unit recruited from volunteers in Louisiana that fought in the Confederate States Army during the American Civil War. The battery organized in March or April 1862 at Monroe, Louisiana. It was nicknamed the "Bell Battery" because the cannons it was supposed to use were cast from bells donated by plantation owners. However, those guns never joined the battery and it received four different cannons. On 10–11 May 1863, the battery fought Union gunboats while part of the garrison of Fort Beauregard. In 1864, it served during the Red River campaign and was present, but not engaged at the battles of Mansfield and Pleasant Hill. The battery dueled with two Union gunboats at DeLoach Bluff on 26 April. After a skirmish on 6 May at Polk's Bridge, three of the battery's four guns became disabled. The soldiers ended the war while manning heavy cannons at Grand Ecore near Natchitoches, Louisiana, and where they surrendered in June 1865. A total of 108 men served in the battery during the war.

== See also ==
- List of Louisiana Confederate Civil War units
- Louisiana in the Civil War
