= List of Confederate units from Louisiana in the American Civil War =

This is a list of Louisiana Confederate Civil War units, including militia and state guard units. The list of Louisiana Union Civil War units is shown separately.

Flag of Louisiana, 1861-1865

== Confederate army ==
=== Infantry ===
- 1st Infantry
- 1st (Strawbridge's) Regulars Infantry
- 2nd Infantry
- 3rd Infantry
- 4th Infantry
- 5th Infantry
- 6th Infantry
- 7th Infantry
- 8th Infantry
- 9th Infantry
- 10th Infantry
- 11th Infantry
- 12th Infantry
- 13th Infantry
- 13th-20th Consolidated Infantry
- 14th Infantry
- 15th Infantry
- 16th Infantry
- 16th-25th Consolidated Infantry
- 17th Infantry
- 18th Infantry
- 19th Infantry
- 20th Infantry
- 21st (Kennedy's) Infantry
- 22nd Infantry (Patton's/Higgins', later 21st)
- 23rd Infantry (Theard's/Herrick's, later 22nd)
- 24th Infantry (Crescent Regiment)
- 25th Infantry
- 26th Infantry
- 27th Infantry
- 28th Infantry (Gray's)
- 29th Infantry (Thomas')
- 30th Infantry
- 31st Infantry
- 32nd Infantry, Miles' Legion
- 33rd Infantry
- 1st (Dreux's/Rightor's) Battalion, Infantry
- 1st (Wheat's) Special Battalion, Infantry (Louisiana Tigers)
- 1st (Coppens') Battalion, Zouaves (C.S. Zouave Battalion)
- 2nd Special Battalion, Infantry

- 2nd (Dupeire's) Battalion, Zouaves
- 3rd Battalion, Infantry (see 15th Infantry)
- 4th Battalion, Infantry
- 5th Battalion, Infantry (see 21st Infantry)
- 6th Battalion, Infantry (see 20th Infantry)
- 7th Battalion, Infantry
- 8th Battalion, Infantry (see 8th Heavy Artillery)
- 9th Battalion, Infantry
- 10th Battalion, Infantry (Yellow Jackets)
- 11th Battalion, Infantry (see Crescent Regiment)
- 12th Battalion, Infantry (Confederate Guards Response Battalion, see Crescent Regiment)
- 13th Battalion, Infantry (see 30th Infantry)
- 14th (Austin's) Battalion, Sharpshooters
- 15th (Weatherly's) Battalion, Sharpshooters
- 30th Battalion, Infantry (after 30th Infantry was downgraded)
- Catahoula Battalion
- Keary's Battalion
- Louisiana Defenders Battalion
- Stewart's Legion

=== Cavalry & partisan rangers ===
- 1st Cavalry
- 2nd Cavalry
- 3rd (Harrison's) Cavalry
- 3rd (Pargould's) Cavalry
- 3rd (Wingfield's) Cavalry
- 4th Cavalry
- 5th Cavalry
- 6th Cavalry
- 7th Cavalry
- 8th Cavalry
- 9th (Ogden's) Cavalry
- 1st Trans-Mississippi Battalion Cavalry
- 9th Battalion, Partisan Rangers
- 13th Battalion, Partisan Rangers
- 15th Battalion, Cavlary
- 18th Battalion, Cavalry
- 19th Battalion, Cavalry
- Gober's Mounted Infantry
- Powers' Cavalry Regiment
- Bayliss' Battalion, Partisan Rangers
- Breazeale's Battalion, Partisan Rangers
- Cage's Battalion (see 14th Confederate)
- Harrison's Battalion
- Red River Scouts Battalion

=== Artillery ===
==== Light Artillery Battalions ====
- Pointe Coupee Artillery Battalion
- Washington Artillery Battalion

==== Light Artillery Companies ====
- 1st Louisiana Field Battery (St. Mary's Cannoneers)
- 1st Louisiana Regular Battery (Semmes' Battery)
- 2nd Louisiana Field Battery (Boone's Battery)
- 3rd Field Battery (Bell Battery)
- 4th Field Battery (Cameron's Battery)
- 5th Field Battery (Pelican Light Artillery)
- 5th Company, Washington Artillery
- 6th Field Battery (Grosse Tete Flying Artillery)
- Barlow's Battery
- Bridges' Battery, Light Artillery
- Crescent Artillery, Company A (Hutton's Battery)
- Donaldsonville Louisiana Artillery (Maurin's Battery, Landry's Battery)
- Fenner's Battery
- Gibson's Battery (Miles' Artillery)
- Holmes' Battery
- King's Battery (Bull Battery)
- Louisiana Guard Battery (Green's Battery)
- Madison Louisiana Light Artillery (Moody's Battery)
- Orleans Guard Battery (LeGardeur's Battery)
- Robinson's Horse Artillery
- Watson Battery

==== Heavy Artillery ====
- 1st Regiment Heavy Artillery
- 2nd Battalion Heavy Artillery
- 8th Battalion Heavy Artillery
- 12th Battalion Heavy Artillery

== Militia, state guards, and reserves ==
- 1st Chasseurs a pied, Militia
- 1st Native Guards, Militia
- Assumption Regiment, Militia
- Beauregard Regiment, Militia
- Cazadores Espanoles Regiment, Militia
- Chalmette Regiment, Militia
- Claiborne Regiment, Militia
- Confederate Guards Regiment, Militia
- Continental Regiment, Militia
- Irish Regiment, Militia
- La Fourche Regiment, Militia
- Orleans Fire Regiment, Militia
- Orleans Guards Regiment, Militia
- Pointe Coupee Light Infantry, Militia
- Pointe Coupee Regiment, Militia
- St. James Regiment, Militia
- St. Martin's Regiment, Militia
- Terrebonne Regiment, Militia
- Vermillion Regiment, Militia
- Louisiana Legion
- Algiers Battalion, Militia
- Battalion British Fusileers, Militia
- Battalion French Volunteers, Militia
- Beauregard Battalion, Militia
- Bragg's Battalion, Militia
- British Guard Battalion, Militia
- Jackson Rifle Battalion, Militia
- Leeds' Guards Battalion, Militia
- Barr's Independent Company (Blakesley Guards), Militia
- Brenan's Company (Company A, Shamrock Guards), Militia
- Delery's Company (St. Bernard Horse Rifles), Militia
- French Company of St. James, Militia
- Knap's Company (Fausse River Guards), Militia
- Lartigue's Company (Bienville Guards), Militia
- Cavalry Squadron (Independent Rangers of Iberville), Militia
- Cagnolatti's Company, Cavalry (Chasseurs of Jefferson), Militia
- Continental Cadets, Militia
- Crescent Cadets, Militia
- Lewis Guards, Militia
- Mechanics Guard, Militia
- Mounted Rangers of Plaquemines, Militia
- Squadron Guides d'Orleans, Militia
- St. John the Baptist Reserve Guards, Militia
- Lafayette Artillery, Militia
- McPherson's Battery (Orleans Howitzers), Militia

=== 1st Division ===
==== 1st Brigade ====
- 3rd Regiment, 1st Brigade, 1st Division, Militia
- 4th Regiment, 1st Brigade, 1st Division, Militia

==== 2nd Brigade ====
- 1st Regiment, 2nd Brigade, 1st Division, Militia
- 2nd Regiment, 2nd Brigade, 1st Division, Militia
- 3rd Regiment, 2nd Brigade, 1st Division, Militia
- 4th Regiment, 2nd Brigade, 1st Division, Militia

==== 3rd Brigade ====
- 1st Regiment, 3rd Brigade, 1st Division, Militia
- 2nd Regiment, 3rd Brigade, 1st Division, Militia
- 3rd Regiment, 3rd Brigade, 1st Division, Militia
- 4th Regiment, 3rd Brigade, 1st Division, Militia

=== European Brigade ===
- 1st Regiment, European Brigade, Militia
- 3rd Regiment, European Brigade (Garde Francaise), Militia
- 4th Regiment, European Brigade, Militia
- 5th Regiment, European Brigade (Spanish Regiment), Militia
- 6th Regiment, European Brigade (Italian Guards Battalion), Militia
- First Slavonian Rifles, Militia
- Second Slavonian Rifles, Militia
- Cognevich Company, Militia

=== French Brigade ===
- 1st Regiment, French Brigade, Militia
- 2nd Regiment, French Brigade, Militia
- 3rd Regiment, French Brigade, Militia
- 4th Regiment, French Brigade, Militia

=== State Guards ===
- 1st Battalion Infantry (State Guards)
- 1st Battalion, Cavalry (State Guards)
- 2nd Battalion, Cavalry (State Guards)

=== Reserves ===
- 1st Reserves
- 2nd Reserve Corps

== See also ==
- Lists of American Civil War Regiments by State
- Confederate Units by State
