= 27th Louisiana Infantry Regiment =

Infantry regiment of the Confederate States Army

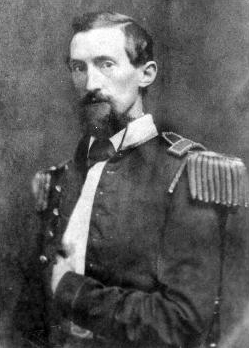
- At Vicksburg, the 27th Louisiana Infantry was in a brigade led by Francis A. Shoup, shown here.
- Active: April 1862 – 19 May 1865
- Country: Confederate States of America
- Allegiance: Louisiana
- Branch: Confederate States Army
- Type: Infantry
- Size: Regiment (973 men, Apr. 1862)
- Part of: Shoup's Brigade
- Engagements: American Civil War; Siege of Vicksburg (1863)

Commanders
- Notable commanders: Leon D. Marks

The 27th Louisiana Infantry Regiment was a unit of volunteers recruited in Louisiana that fought in the Confederate States Army during the American Civil War. The regiment formed in April 1862 at Camp Moore and served during the war in the Western Theater of the American Civil War. On 1 May 1862, the regiment marched to Mississippi and defended Vicksburg. The regiment suffered heavy losses, including both its colonel and lieutenant colonel killed, while defending the city during the Siege of Vicksburg. The survivors were captured when Vicksburg fell, were paroled, and went home. The regiment was declared exchanged in fall 1863, but many soldiers failed to report for duty. Two companies joined Gober's Louisiana Mounted Infantry Regiment, but most of the men spent the rest of the war near Pineville, Louisiana, on garrison duty, and disbanded in April and May 1865.

== See also ==
- List of Louisiana Confederate Civil War units
- Louisiana in the Civil War
