= 21st Louisiana Infantry Regiment =

Infantry regiment of the Confederate States Army

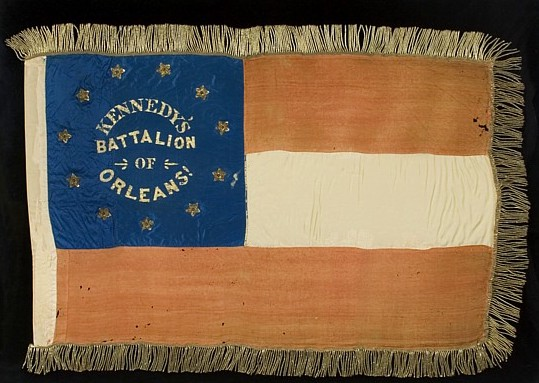
- Battle flag of the 5th Louisiana Infantry Battalion
- Active: September 1861 – February 1862 (battalion); February–July 1862 (regiment)
- Country: Confederate States of America
- Allegiance: Louisiana
- Branch: Confederate States Army
- Type: Infantry
- Size: 784 officers and men (9 February 1862)
- Engagements: Battle of Belmont; Siege of Corinth

The 21st Louisiana Infantry Regiment, also called the McCown Regiment, was an infantry regiment from Louisiana that served in the Confederate States Army during the American Civil War. Six of its companies formed the 5th Louisiana Infantry Battalion organized in September 1861, which fought in the Battle of Belmont as cannoneers. The battalion was brought up to regimental strength, becoming the 21st Louisiana, by the addition of four companies in February 1862. After service at Island Number Ten, Fort Pillow, and the Siege of Corinth, the regiment was disbanded due to its high desertion rate.

== History ==
The companies that became part of the 5th Louisiana Infantry Battalion were originally part of the Jackson Regiment of the Louisiana Militia, which was organized in New Orleans from locals on 29 June 1861. Six companies from the Jackson Regiment were sent to Columbus, Kentucky in August, where they were organized as the 5th Louisiana Infantry Battalion by an order of General Leonidas Polk on 20 September. John B. G. Kennedy was elected lieutenant colonel and John Newman major. The Bonford Guards became Company A, the Campbell Guards Company B, the Huckins Guard (also known as the Noel Rangers) Company C, Company A of the McClelland Guards Company D, the Kosicinski Guards (also known as the Whamm Rifle Guards) Company E, and the Askew Greys Company F. The men of the battalion served as cannonners for the heavy artillery batteries at Columbus during the Battle of Belmont on 7 November.

The battalion was expanded to the 21st Louisiana Infantry Regiment at Columbus on 9 February 1862 by the addition of four new companies, bringing it to 784 men. The four companies (G, H, I, and K) were also from New Orleans. Companies C and B of the McClelland Guards became Companies H and I of the regiment, respectively, while Company K may have been known as the Dugue Guards. Kennedy was elected colonel, West Steever lieutenant colonel, and Newman continued as major.

Elements of the regiment marched to Island Number Ten on 23 February to begin the construction of heavy artillery batteries, soon followed by the remainder of the regiment to complete the task. The regiment departed for Fort Pillow on 17 March, where it served with the garrison until the evacuation of the fort in May. The 21st Louisiana then went to Corinth, Mississippi, fighting in a nearby skirmish on 28 May. After the evacuation of Corinth, the regiment and the Army of Mississippi retreated to Tupelo. It was ordered disbanded by army commander General Braxton Bragg on 28 July due to disease and desertion and its men transferred to other Louisiana units of the army. Company C was transferred as a unit to become Company B of the 20th Louisiana Infantry on 23 July, as a replacement for the original Company B, which had been detached from the regiment and captured at the Battle of New Orleans. The men of Company C were most of the roughly 64 to 73 men who went to the 20th Louisiana. The majority of the men of the regiment went to the 1st Louisiana Regulars, with 99 of these transfers documented in surviving records.

== See also ==
- List of Louisiana Confederate Civil War units
