= Miles' Legion =

Infantry regiment of the Confederate States Army

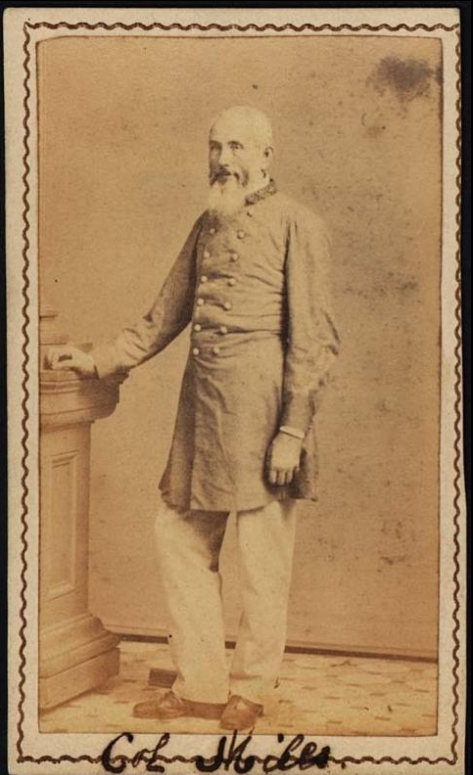
- William R. Miles was colonel of Miles' Legion.
- Active: April 1862 – Spring 1865
- Country: Confederate States of America
- Allegiance: Louisiana
- Branch: Confederate States Army
- Type: Legion
- Role: Infantry; Cavalry
- Size: 12 companies
- Engagements: American Civil War; Battle of Plains Store (1863); Siege of Port Hudson (1863)

Commanders
- Notable commanders: William R. Miles

Miles' Legion was a unit of the Confederate Army during the American Civil War. It was commanded by Colonel William R. Miles. The unit was officially named the 32nd Louisiana Infantry Regiment but it was never referred to by that name. The legion fought at the Battle of Plains Store and the Siege of Port Hudson. Captured at Port Hudson, the men were paroled, and the legion was declared exchanged in fall 1863. Many of the exchanged men never returned to duty. Those who did return joined Gober's Mounted Infantry Regiment or the 15th Louisiana Sharpshooter Battalion.

== Organization ==
Miles' Legion was formed at Camp Moore in April 1862. Though designated as the 32nd Regiment, Louisiana Volunteers, it never used the specified name.

Unlike most Civil War formations, it was a combined arms force composed of more than one type of unit. In this particular case, it was organized as a battalion of seven infantry companies and another of five companies of cavalry at Port Hudson, Louisiana, in the early summer of 1862 under the command of Colonel William R. Miles.

The infantrymen were recruited from Livingston, Orleans and Tangipahoa Parishes. The cavalry drew its ranks from East Baton Rouge, East Feliciana, and St. Tammany Parishes.

In April 1862, a "William Bradley" joined Company G at Natchez, Mississippi; the soldier was discharged in June when it was discovered that Bradley was a woman.

== In action ==
In April and May 1863, 2,400 Legion soldiers, including 300 cavalrymen, were assigned to help try to stop Grierson's Raid from reaching Baton Rouge.

Miles' Legion fought in the Siege of Port Hudson under the command of Lieutenant Colonel Frederick B. Brand. During the Battle of Plains Store on May 21, 1863, Confederate and Union forces had already fought and disengaged by the time Colonel Miles arrived with reinforcements from Port Hudson. Nevertheless, late in the day, Miles launched an attack, with some initial success, but was eventually forced to retreat by a counterattack. The unit suffered 89 casualties. On May 26, the infantrymen clashed with the men of the 116th New York Volunteer Infantry Regiment. The following day, the unit manned artillery pieces on the battle line. Along with the rest of the defenders, the battalion surrendered on July 9, 1863. Victorious General Nathaniel P. Banks paroled the enlisted men, but the officers were made prisoners of war. Though the officers were eventually exchanged, the infantry battalion was not reformed.

The cavalry battalion continued to fight in Mississippi and Louisiana under Major James T. Coleman, before disbanding in the spring of 1865.

== See also ==
- List of Louisiana Confederate Civil War units
- List of American Civil War legions

== Bibliography ==
- Bergeron, Arthur W. Jr. (1989). Guide to Louisiana Confederate Military Units 1861-1865. Baton Rouge, La.: Louisiana State University Press. ISBN 0-8071-2102-9.
