= 29th Louisiana Infantry Regiment =

Infantry regiment of the Confederate States Army

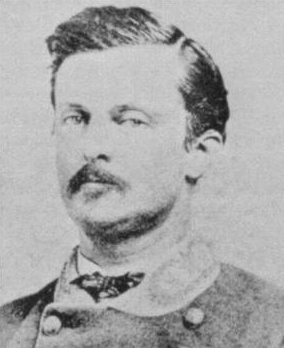
- Allen Thomas was the regiment's first commander. He later became a brigadier general.
- Active: 3 May 1862 – 19 May 1865
- Country: Confederate States of America
- Allegiance: Louisiana
- Branch: Confederate States Army
- Type: Infantry
- Size: Regiment
- Part of: Shoup's Brigade
- Engagements: American Civil War; Battle of Chickasaw Bayou (1862); Siege of Vicksburg (1863)

Commanders
- Notable commanders: Allen Thomas

The 29th Louisiana Infantry Regiment was a unit of volunteers recruited in Louisiana that fought in the Confederate States Army during the American Civil War. The regiment formed in May 1862 at Camp Moore by adding five independent companies to a battalion that Allen Thomas recruited for the state. The unit served during the war in the Western Theater of the American Civil War. Immediately after organizing, the regiment marched to Vicksburg, Mississippi. The regiment fought at Chickasaw Bayou in December 1862. It manned defenses on the left flank during the Siege of Vicksburg and was captured when the city fell. The soldiers marched to a parole camp, but later were dismissed on furlough and went home. In the summer of 1864, the men were ordered to report to a camp near Alexandria, Louisiana, but many of the soldiers stayed home. Those soldiers who reported to camp spent the rest of the war near Pineville, Louisiana, and disbanded in May 1865.

== See also ==
- List of Louisiana Confederate Civil War units
- Louisiana in the Civil War
