= Battle of Chickasaw Bayou order of battle: Union =

The following Union Army units and commanders fought in the Battle of Chickasaw Bayou of the American Civil War. The Confederate order of battle is listed separately.

== Abbreviations used ==
=== Military rank ===
- MG = Major General
- BG = Brigadier General
- Col = Colonel
- Ltc = Lieutenant Colonel
- Maj = Major
- Cpt = Captain
- Lt = 1st Lieutenant

=== Other ===
- w = wounded
- k = killed

== Expeditionary Force, Army of the Tennessee ==
=== Right Wing, XIII Corps ===
MG William T. Sherman

Division	Brigade	Regiments and Others
First Division; BG Andrew Jackson Smith: Escort: Company C, 4th Indiana Cavalry: Cpt Joseph P. Lesslie	1st Brigade BG Stephen Gano Burbridge	16th Indiana: Col Thomas J. Lucas; 60th Indiana: Col Richard Owen; 67th Indiana: Col Frank Emerson; 83rd Ohio: Ltc William H. Baldwin; 96th Ohio: Col Joseph W. Vance; 23rd Wisconsin: Col Joseph J. Guppey
First Division; BG Andrew Jackson Smith: Escort: Company C, 4th Indiana Cavalry: Cpt Joseph P. Lesslie	2nd Brigade Col William J. Landram	77th Illinois: Col David P. Grier; 97th Illinois: Col Friend S. Rutherford; 108th Illinois: Col John Warner; 131st Illinois: Col George W. Neeley; 89th Indiana: Col Charles D. Murray; 19th Kentucky: Ltc John Cowan; 48th Ohio: Ltc Job R. Parker
Second Division; BG Morgan Lewis Smith (w); BG David Stuart	1st Brigade Col Giles A. Smith	113th Illinois: Col George B. Hoge; 116th Illinois: Col Nathan W. Tupper; 6th Missouri: Ltc James H. Blood; 8th Missouri: Ltc David C. Coleman; 1st Battalion, 13th U.S.: Maj Dudley Chase
Second Division; BG Morgan Lewis Smith (w); BG David Stuart	4th Brigade BG David Stuart; Col Thomas Kilby Smith	55th Illinois: Ltc Oscar Malmborg; 127th Illinois: Col John Van Arman; 83rd Indiana: Col Benjamin J. Spooner; 54th Ohio: Col Thomas Kilby Smith; 57th Ohio: Col William Mungen
Third Division; BG George Washington Morgan	1st Brigade Col Lionel A. Sheldon	118th Illinois: Col John G. Fonda; 69th Indiana: Col Thomas Warren Bennett; 120th Ohio: Col Daniel French
Third Division; BG George Washington Morgan	2nd Brigade Col Daniel W. Lindsey	49th Indiana: Col James Keigwin; 7th Kentucky: Ltc Joel W. Ridgell; 114th Ohio: Ltc Horatio B. Maynard
Third Division; BG George Washington Morgan	3rd Brigade Col John F. DeCourcy	54th Indiana: Col Fielding Mansfield; 22nd Kentucky: Ltc George W. Monroe (w), Maj William J. Worthington; 16th Ohio: Ltc Philip Kershner (w/c); 42nd Ohio: Ltc Don Albert Pardee
Third Division; BG George Washington Morgan	Artillery	Battery G, 1st Michigan Light Artillery: Cpt Charles H. Lanphere; 1st Wisconsin Light Artillery: Cpt Jacob T. Foster
Fourth Division; BG Frederick Steele	1st Brigade BG Francis Preston Blair Jr.	13th Illinois: Col John B. Wyman (k), Ltc Adam B. Gorgas; 29th Missouri: Col John S. Cavender; 30th Missouri: Ltc Otto Schadt; 31st Missouri: Col Thomas C. Fletcher (w/c), Ltc Samuel P. Simpson (w); 32nd Missouri: Col Francis H. Manter; 58th Ohio: Ltc Peter Dister (k); 4th Ohio Battery: Cpt Louis Hoffman; Company C, 10th Missouri Cavalry: Lt Daniel W. Ballon
Fourth Division; BG Frederick Steele	2nd Brigade BG Charles E. Hovey	25th Iowa: Col George A. Stone; 31st Iowa: Col William Smyth; 3rd Missouri: Col Isaac F. Shepard; 12th Missouri: Col Hugo Wangelin; 17th Missouri: Col Francis Hassendeubel; 76th Ohio: Col Charles Robert Woods; 1st Missouri Horse Artillery: Cpt Clemens Landgraeber
Fourth Division; BG Frederick Steele	3rd Brigade BG John Milton Thayer	4th Iowa: Col James Alexander Williamson (w); 9th Iowa: Ltc William H. Coyl; 26th Iowa: Col Milo Smith; 30th Iowa: Col Charles H. Abbott; 34th Iowa: Col George W. Clark; 1st Iowa Light Artillery: Cpt Henry H. Griffiths

==== Unattached units ====
- Battery A, 1st Illinois Light Artillery: Cpt Peter P. Wood
- Battery B, 1st Illinois Light Artillery: Cpt Samuel E. Barrett
- Battery H, 1st Illinois Light Artillery: Lt Levi W. Hart
- Chicago Mercantile Light Artillery: Cpt Charles G. Cooley
- 8th Ohio Light Artillery: Lt James F. Putnam
- 17th Ohio Light Artillery: Cpt Ambrose A. Blount
- 3rd Illinois Cavalry: Col Lafayette McCrillis
- Thielman's Battalion (Illinois):
- 6th Missouri Cavalry: Col Clark Wright
- Patterson's Kentucky Engineers & Mechanics: Cpt William F. Patterson

== See also ==
- Mississippi in the American Civil War
