= 62nd Tennessee Infantry Regiment =

- Flag of Tennessee
- Active: 1862–1865
- Country: Confederate States of America
- Allegiance: Tennessee
- Branch: Confederate States Army
- Type: Infantry
- Engagements: Battle of Chickasaw Bayou; Vicksburg Campaign; Battle of Big Black River Bridge; Siege of Vicksburg; Battle of Piedmont; Lynchburg Campaign; Battle of Monocacy; Greenville, Tennessee

Commanders
- Colonel: John A. Rowan
- Lieutenant Colonel: William A. Parker
- Majors: Simeon D. Reynolds, William R. Smith

The 62nd Tennessee Infantry Regiment, also known as 62nd Tennessee Mounted Infantry and 80th Tennessee Infantry Regiment, was an infantry regiment in the Confederate States Army during the American Civil War. It served on Mississippi, Tennessee, West Virginia, Maryland and Virginia and surrendered at Washington, Georgia on May 9, 1865 as part of Jeff Davis escort.

== Organization and muster ==
The 62nd Tennessee was formed on October 8 and mustered into service on November 11 at Sweetwater, Tennessee. At Vicksburg, the Regiment was taken prisoner; it was released in late July 1863. In January 1864 the Regiment was Mounted and declared exchanged on June 27, 1864. They served remainder of war in Vaughn's Brigade in East Tennessee and Virginia.

== See also ==
- List of Tennessee Confederate Civil War units

== Notes ==
Bibliography

- Bible, Donahue (1995). From Persia to Piedmont: "life and Death in Vaughn's Brigade". Dodson Creek Publishers. OCLC 34622408.
- Stewart Sifakis. Compendium of the Confederate Armies: Tennessee. Facts on File, NY 1992 ISBN 0-8160-2286-0
- Lindsley, John B. "Tennesseans in the Civil War". Military Annals of Tennessee. Nashville 1886.
- Scaife, James V. The Civil War, Tennessee Roll of Honor. Cornell University Library, New York 1919
- Civil War Centennial Commission (1964). Tennesseans in the Civil War: A Military History of Confederate and Union Units with Available Rosters of Personnel 1. Nashville, Tennessee.
- U.S. War Department, The War of the Rebellion: a Compilation of the Official Records of the Union and Confederate Armies, U.S. Government Printing Office, 1880–1901.
