= 22nd Louisiana Infantry Regiment =

Infantry regiment of the Confederate States Army

22nd Louisiana Infantry Regiment 22nd Consolidated Louisiana Regiment
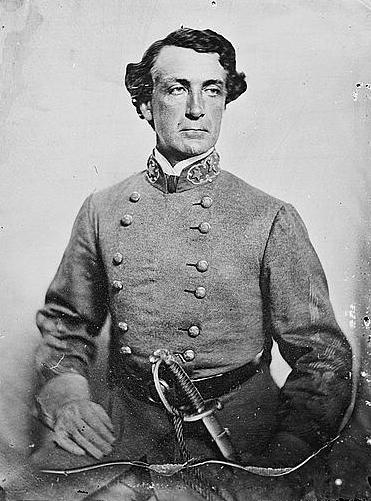
- Martin L. Smith was the regiment's first commander. He was soon promoted brigadier general.
- Active: 28 March 1862 – 8 May 1865
- Country: Confederate States of America
- Allegiance: Louisiana
- Branch: Confederate States Army
- Type: Infantry
- Size: Regiment (961 men, Mar. 1862)
- Engagements: American Civil War; Defense of Fort Jackson (1862); Capture of New Orleans (1862); Yazoo Pass expedition (1863); Siege of Vicksburg (1863); Battle of Spanish Fort (1865)

Commanders
- Notable commanders: Martin Luther Smith

The 22nd Louisiana Infantry Regiment was a unit of volunteers recruited in Louisiana that fought in the Confederate States Army during the American Civil War. The regiment formed in April 1862 at New Orleans and served during the war in the Western Theater of the American Civil War. The men trained as gunners for heavy artillery and the regiment was split up to garrison various forts. Two companies were assigned to hold Fort Jackson, fought in the Defense of Fort Jackson, and surrendered afterward. One company made a futile defense during the Capture of New Orleans. The regiment reorganized at Camp Moore and traveled to Vicksburg, Mississippi, to participate in its defense. The unit was renamed the 21st Louisiana Infantry Regiment in January 1863. Elements of the regiment assisted in the repulse of the Yazoo Pass expedition. The soldiers served at the Siege of Vicksburg, surrendered when the city fell, and afterward reported to a parole camp. In January 1864, the 22nd Consolidated Louisiana Infantry Regiment was reconstituted with 780 men from seven different Louisiana units that had surrendered at Vicksburg. The unit was ordered to Mobile, Alabama, where four companies fought at Spanish Fort in March and April 1865. The regiment surrendered in May 1865.

== See also ==
- List of Louisiana Confederate Civil War units
- Louisiana in the Civil War
