= 26th Louisiana Infantry Regiment =

Infantry regiment of the Confederate States Army

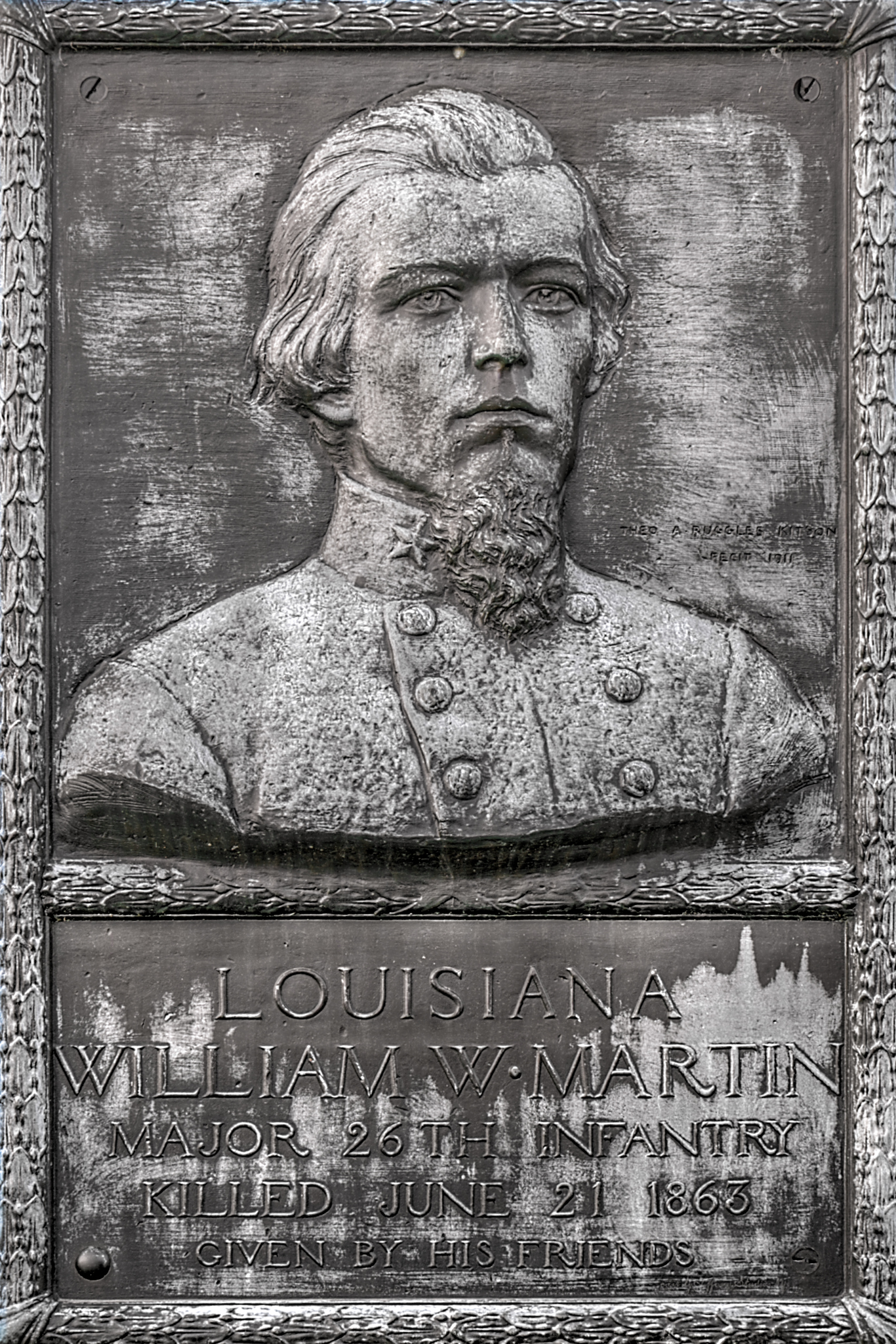
- Memorial to Major William W. Martin of the 26th Louisiana Infantry, killed 21 June 1863, is at Vicksburg National Military Park.
- Active: 3 April 1862 – 19 May 1865
- Country: Confederate States of America
- Allegiance: Louisiana
- Branch: Confederate States Army
- Type: Infantry
- Size: Regiment (805 men, Apr. 1862)
- Part of: Shoup's Brigade
- Engagements: American Civil War; Battle of Chickasaw Bayou (1862); Siege of Vicksburg (1863)

Commanders
- Notable commanders: Robert Richardson

The 26th Louisiana Infantry Regiment was a unit of volunteers recruited in Louisiana that fought in the Confederate States Army during the American Civil War. The regiment formed in April 1862 in New Orleans and served during the war in the Western Theater of the American Civil War. After the Capture of New Orleans, the regiment marched to Mississippi and stayed in the area of Jackson and Vicksburg. It fought at Chickasaw Bayou in December 1862. The regiment defended the city during the Siege of Vicksburg and was captured when it fell. The soldiers were paroled and went home. The regiment was not declared exchanged until August 1864, but many soldiers never reported for duty. What remained of the regiment spent most of the rest of the war near Pineville, Louisiana, on garrison duty, and disbanded in May 1865.

== See also ==
- List of Louisiana Confederate Civil War units
- Louisiana in the Civil War
