= 31st Louisiana Infantry Regiment =

Infantry regiment of the Confederate States Army

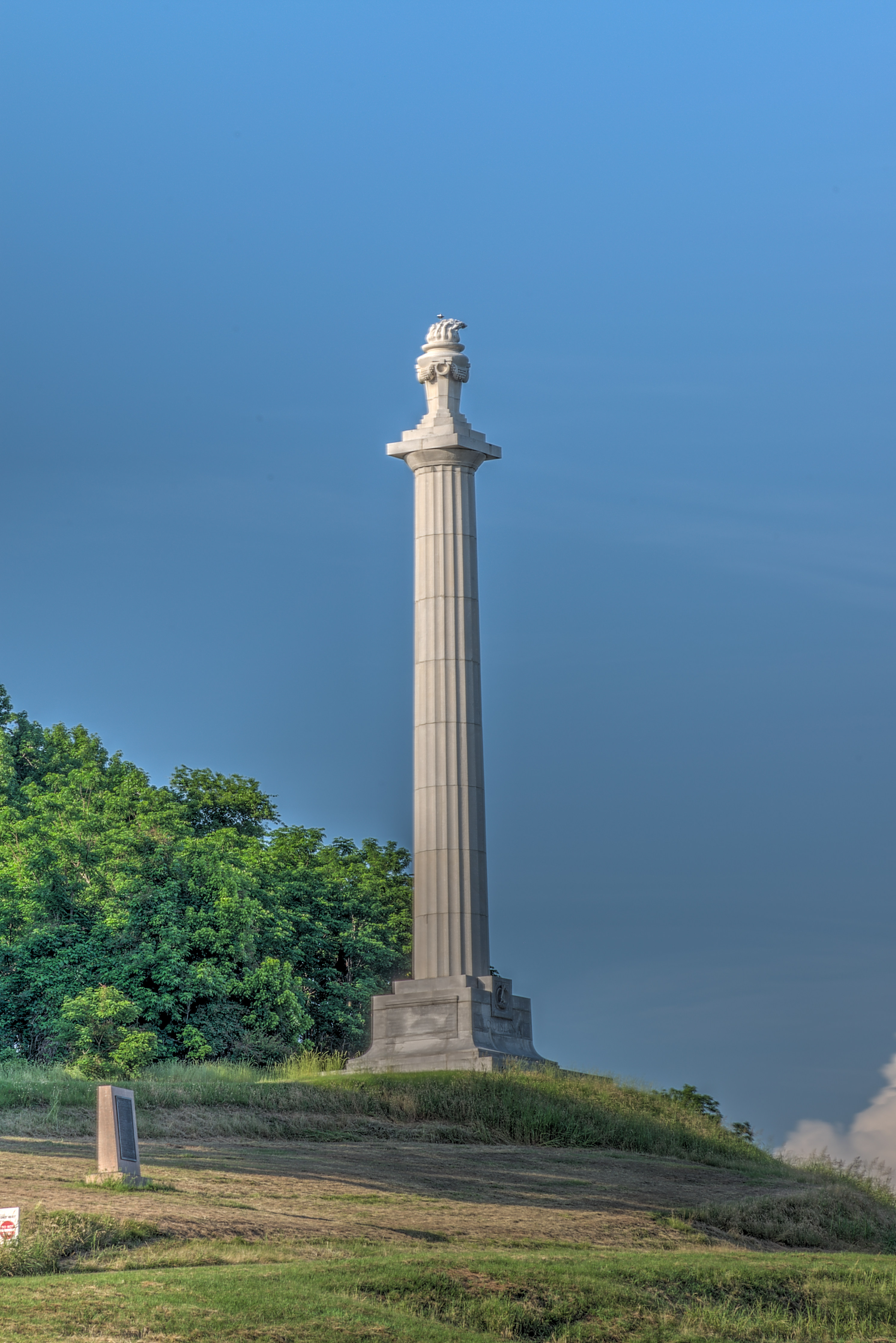
- Louisiana memorial at Vicksburg National Military Park
- Active: 14 May 1862 – 19 May 1865
- Country: Confederate States of America
- Allegiance: Louisiana
- Branch: Confederate States Army
- Type: Infantry
- Size: Regiment
- Part of: Baldwin's Brigade
- Engagements: American Civil War; Battle of Chickasaw Bayou (1862); Battle of Port Gibson (1863); Siege of Vicksburg (1863)

Commanders
- Notable commanders: Charles H. Morrison

The 31st Louisiana Infantry Regiment was a unit of volunteers recruited in Louisiana that fought in the Confederate States Army during the American Civil War. The unit began its existence as Morrison's Battalion on 14 May 1862. The regiment organized at Monroe, Louisiana, on 11 June, after which it moved to Madison Parish, Louisiana, near Vicksburg, Mississippi. The unit stayed near Tallulah and Delhi until November, when it was ordered to Jackson, Mississippi. There, the Catahoula Battalion joined the regiment, bringing it up to ten companies. In December 1862, the regiment fought at Chickasaw Bayou. After remaining near Vicksburg in the early part of the year, it fought at Port Gibson on 1 May 1863. During the Siege of Vicksburg, the soldiers defended the city, surrendered when the place fell, and were paroled. When the regiment was exchanged in June 1864, many of the men chose to remain at home. The soldiers who returned to duty eventually marched to Pineville, which they guarded until February 1865. At that time, the regiment marched to Bayou Cotile. The unit disbanded in May 1865.

== See also ==
- List of Louisiana Confederate Civil War units
- Louisiana in the Civil War
