= Camp Moore =

Historic site in Tangipahoa Parish, Louisiana

- U.S. National Register of Historic Places
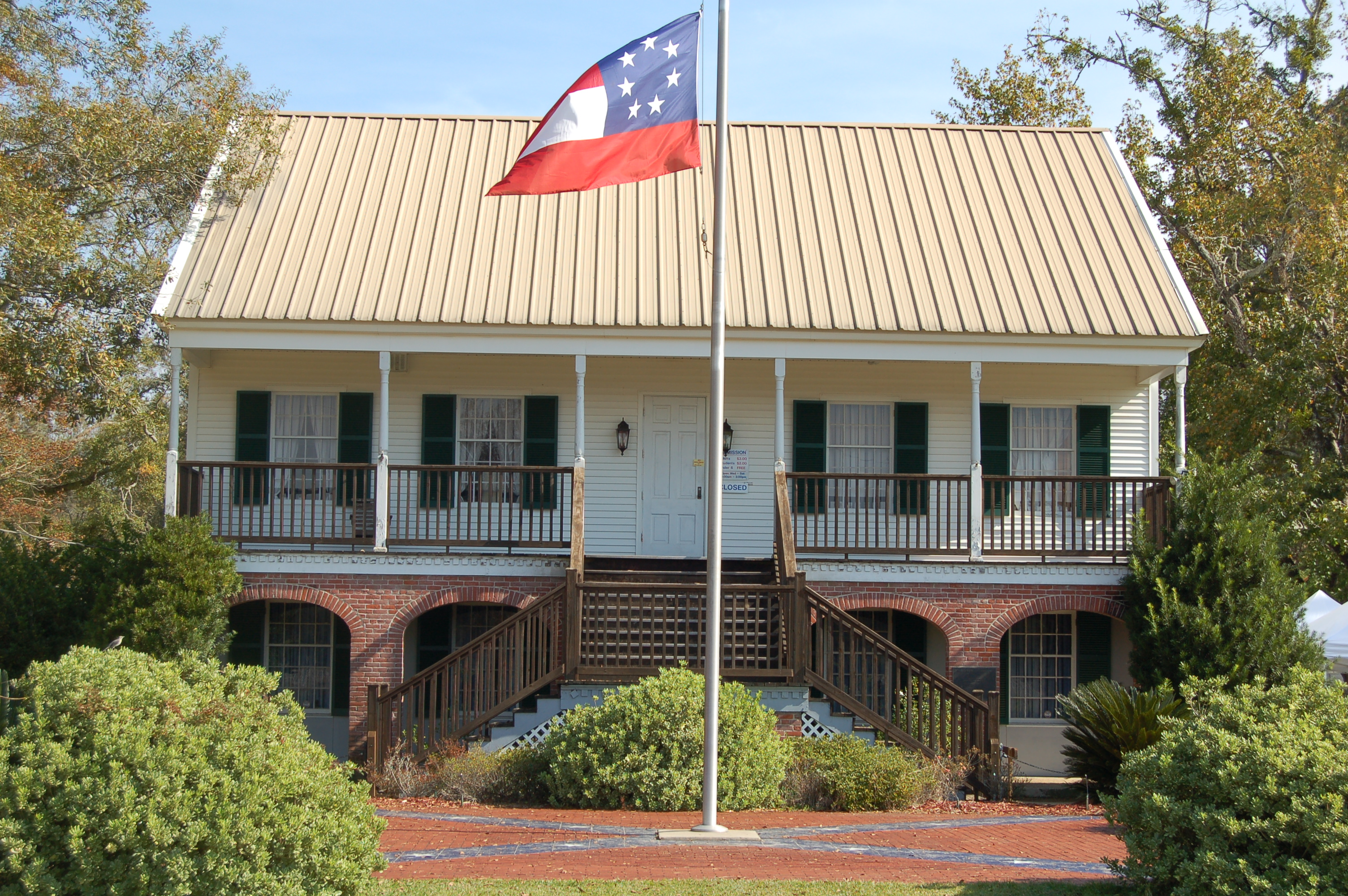
- Camp Moore Museum

- Location within Louisiana Location within the United States
- Location: Tangipahoa Parish, Louisiana
- Nearest city: Tangipahoa, Louisiana
- Coordinates: 30°53′07″N 90°30′36″W
- Area: 450 acres (180 ha)
- Built: 1861
- NRHP reference No.: 79001092
- Added to NRHP: August 21, 1979

Camp Moore, north of the Village of Tangipahoa near Kentwood, Louisiana, was a Confederate training base and principal base of operations in eastern Louisiana and southwestern Mississippi. The base was named for Louisiana Governor Thomas Overton Moore. It operated from May 1861 to 1864 during the American Civil War. Confederate monuments were erected at the cemetery and on the grounds in the early 20th century.

This location was chosen for development of the camp due to its relatively high ground elevation, abundance of fresh drinking water, and nearness to the then New Orleans, Jackson and Great Northern Railroad line.

A small portion of the camp remains, containing the Camp Moore Confederate Cemetery and Museum. The state built the museum at the site in 1965, which displays and interprets area Confederate history. The site was listed on the National Register of Historic Places in 1979. It is still owned by the state, but is operated under lease by a private non-profit.

== Overview ==
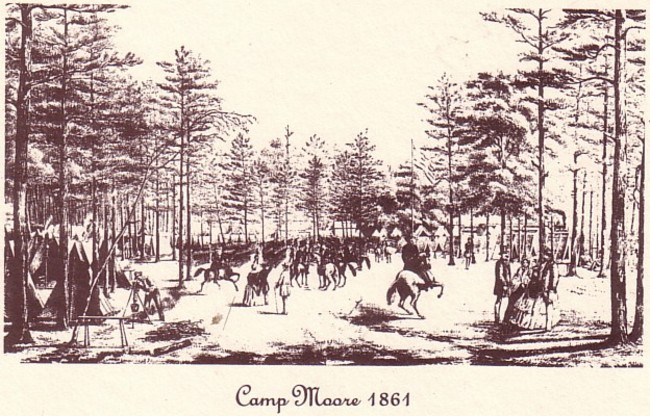
Lithograph of Camp Moore circa 1861

Confederate President Jefferson Davis authorized establishment of Camp Moore. It was developed near a railroad line for ready access to transportation for troops, supplies and equipment.

The thousands of troops who were organized and trained at Camp Moore included the regiments that later constituted the Louisiana Tigers from Calcasieu Parish. As many as 20,000 men from Louisiana were trained at Camp Moore before fighting in battles in Kentucky, Virginia, Tennessee, and Arkansas. Troops from Mississippi and Arkansas were also trained at the base.

Many of the Confederate soldiers buried in the cemetery died of various diseases. In the center of the cemetery stands a monument which was dedicated in 1907. The monument measures 22.5 feet (6.9 m) tall. On top of the monument is a statue of a Confederate private soldier that is 6 feet (1.8 m) tall.

The log house was built in 1929, as a chapter house for Chapter No. 562 of the United Daughters of the Confederacy. Next to the log house stands a monument to area Confederate soldiers, which was dedicated in 1979.

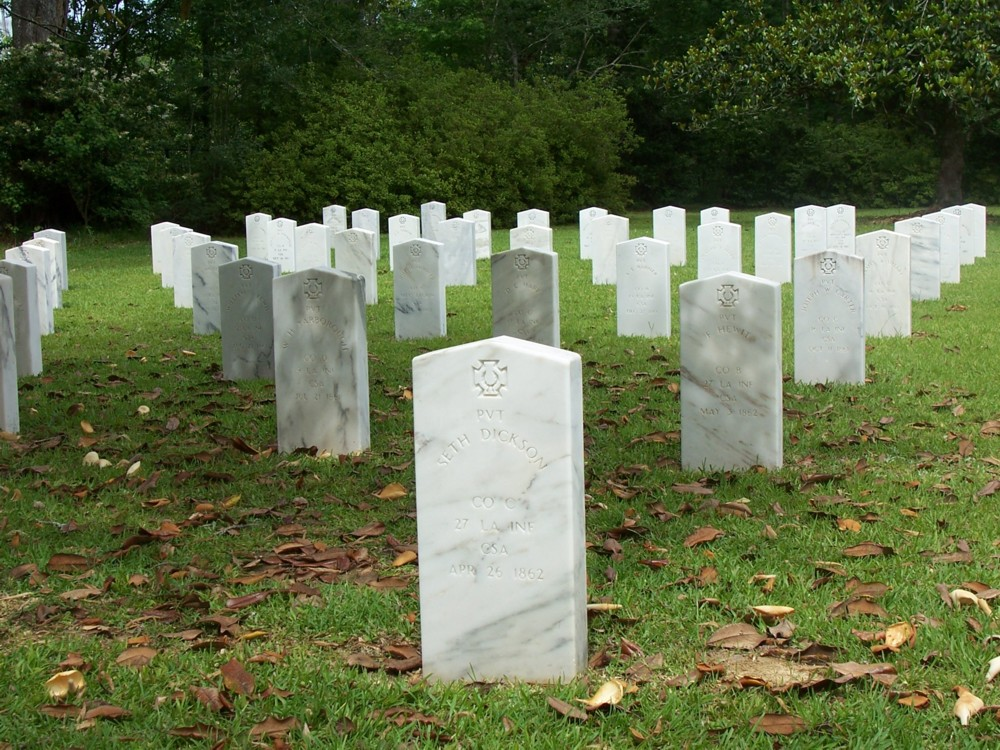
Graves at Camp Moore Confederate cemetery

Confederate soldier monument at Camp Moore

Built in 1965 and designated as a State Commemorative Area, the museum contains artifacts from the Civil War and regional history. In 1986, Governor Edwards closed the site, along with other commemorative areas across the State, during a state monetary crunch.

The site is still owned by the Louisiana Office of State Lands; a private, non-profit entity, the Camp Moore Historical Association, was formed to preserve and operate the site. It made a 97-year lease with the State of Louisiana, and reopened the site in June 1993.

The Camp Moore Museum, Memorial, and cemetery is located on US 51 approximately 8 miles (13 km) south of the Louisiana/Mississippi state line. The property comprises approximately 6.2 acres (25,000 m^{2}). The Museum is open to the public for tours, Wednesday through Saturday 10:00 am to 3:00 pm, and closed on major holidays. An annual Civil War re-enactment is held annually on the weekend before Thanksgiving. This two-day event, held on Saturday and Sunday, features scripted battles, living history displays, and memorial ceremonies.

== Gallery ==
Camp Moore

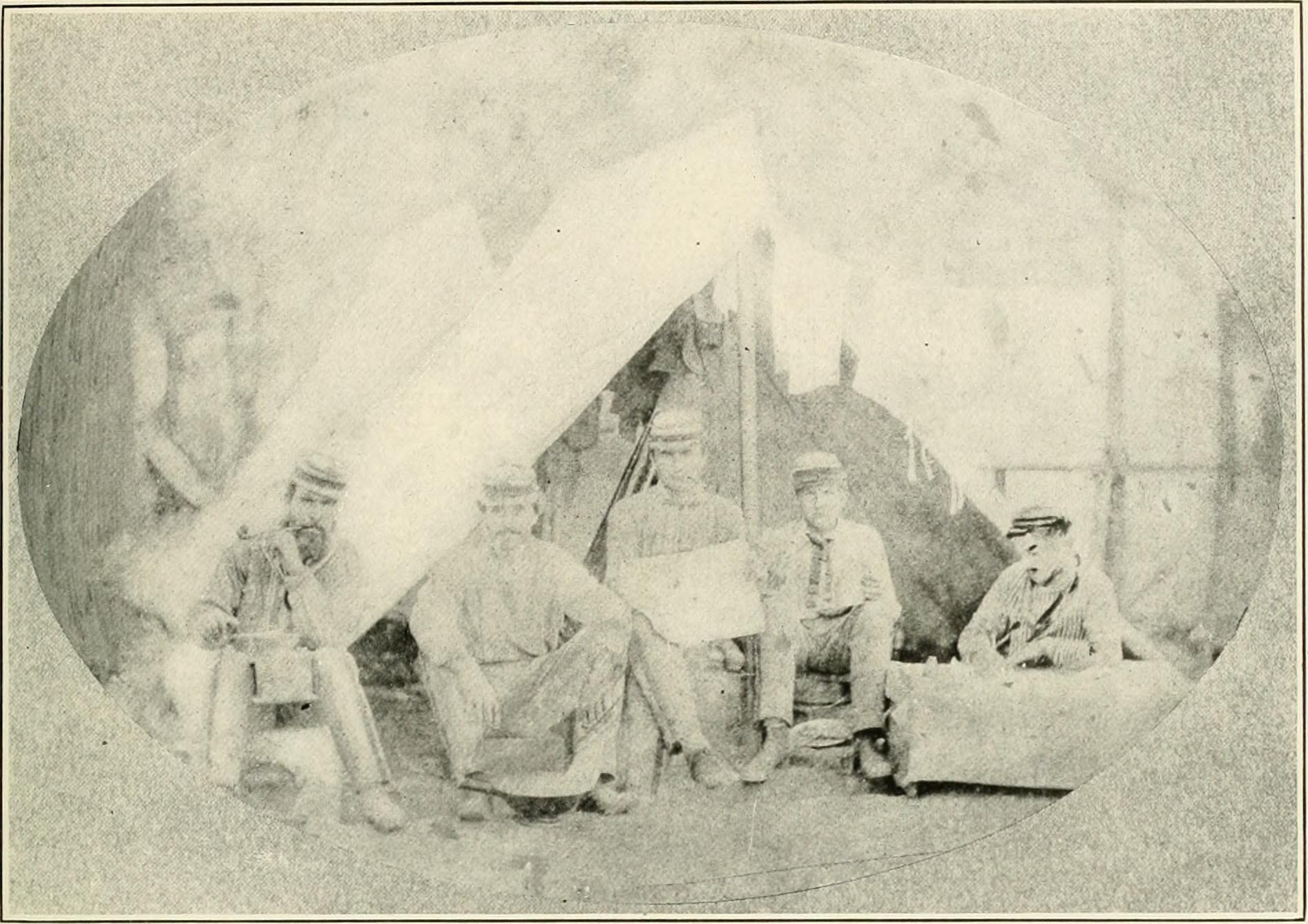
Soldiers of 4th Louisiana Company H, Camp Moore 1861.

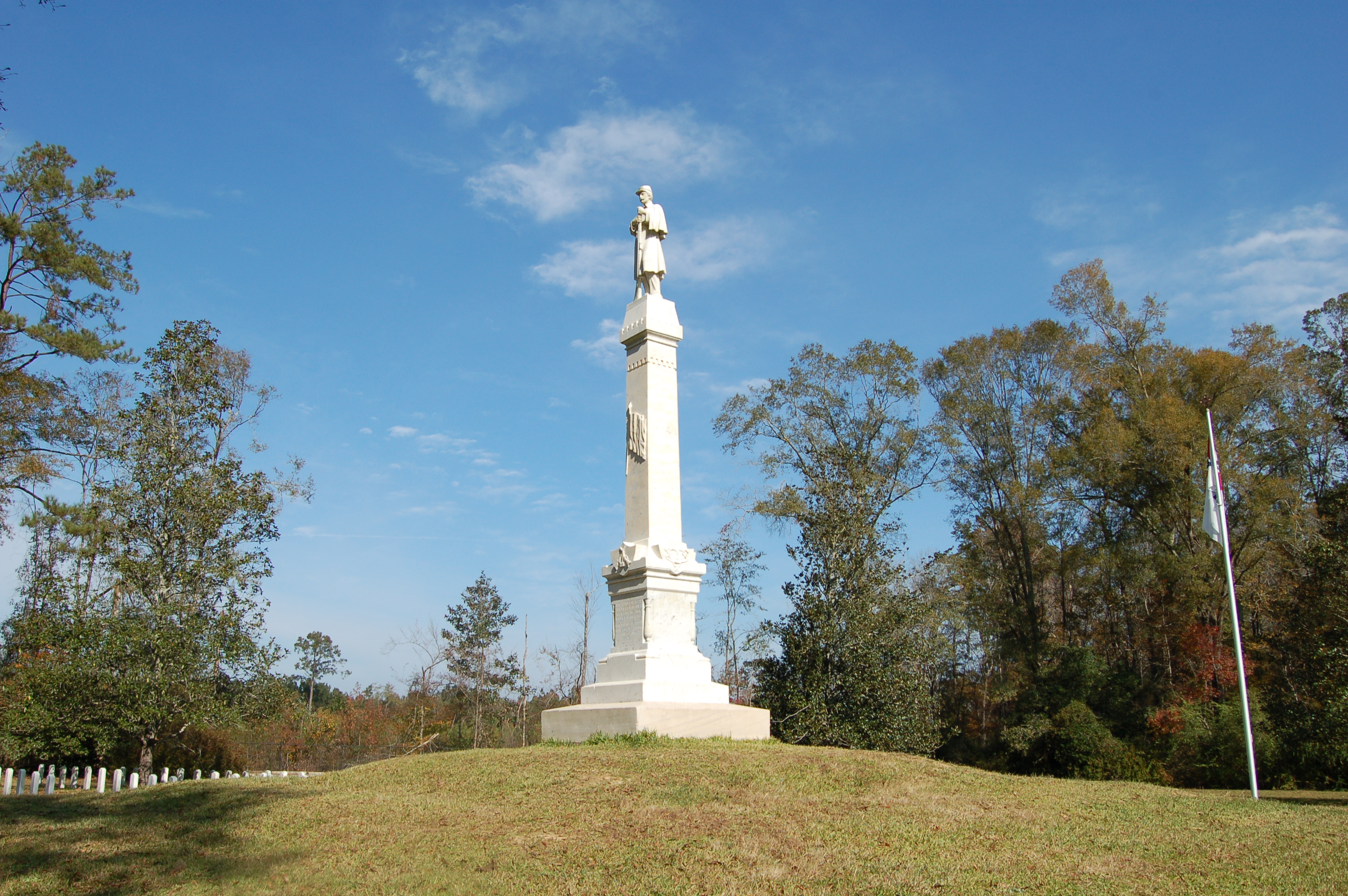
Confederate Memorial.
