= James B. McPherson =

U.S. Army general in the American Civil War (1828–1864)

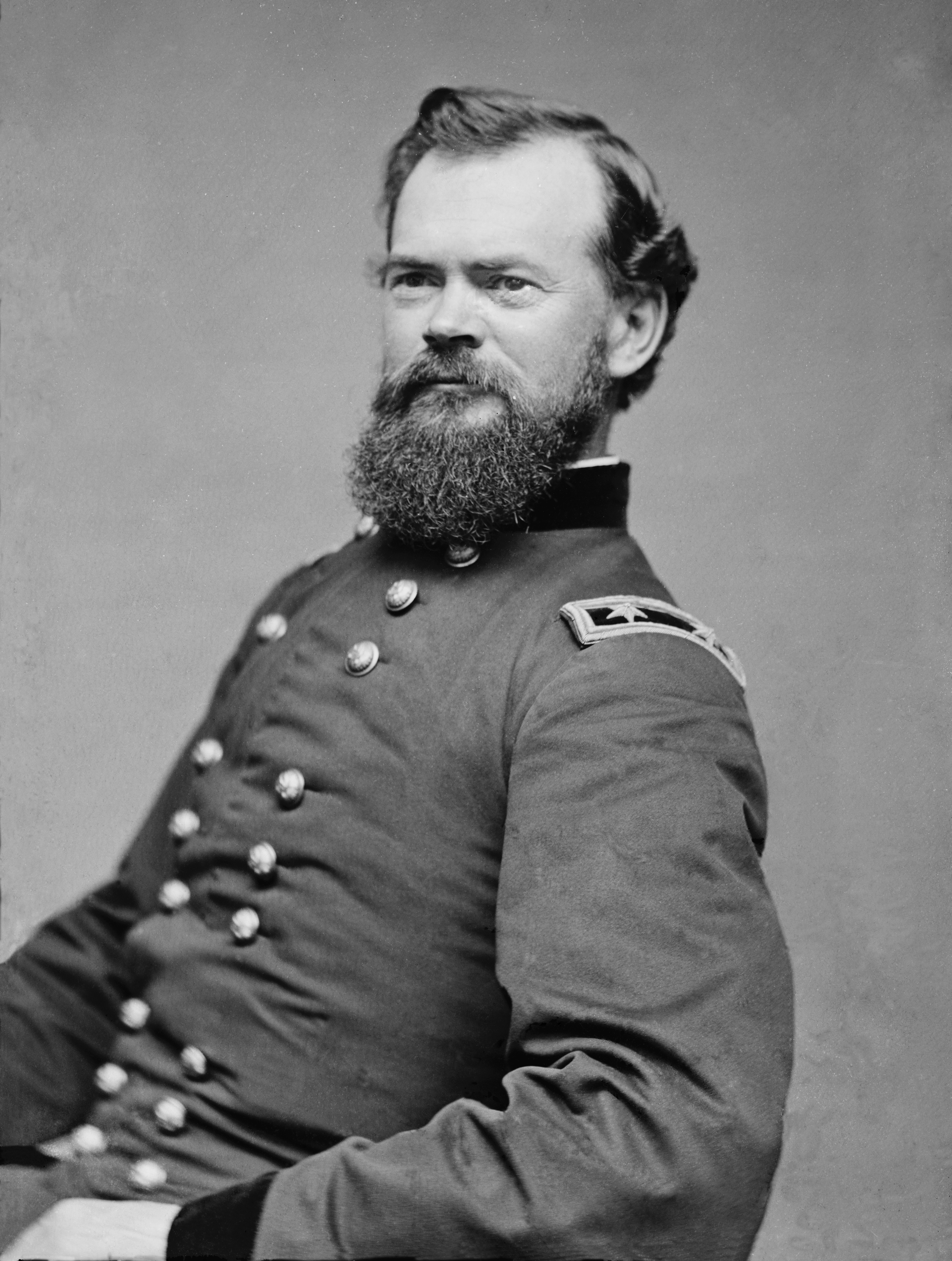
- Portrait c. 1863 by Mathew Brady
- Born: November 14, 1828; Clyde, Ohio, U.S.
- Died: July 22, 1864 (aged 35); Atlanta, Georgia
- Burial place: McPherson Cemetery
- Military career
- Allegiance: United States
- Branch: United States Army
- Service years: 1853–1864
- Rank: Major general
- Unit: U.S. Army Corps of Engineers
- Commands: XVII Corps; Army of the Tennessee
- Conflicts: American Civil War; Battle of Fort Henry; Battle of Fort Donelson; Battle of Shiloh; Battle of Raymond; Siege of Vicksburg; Atlanta campaign; Battle of Atlanta †

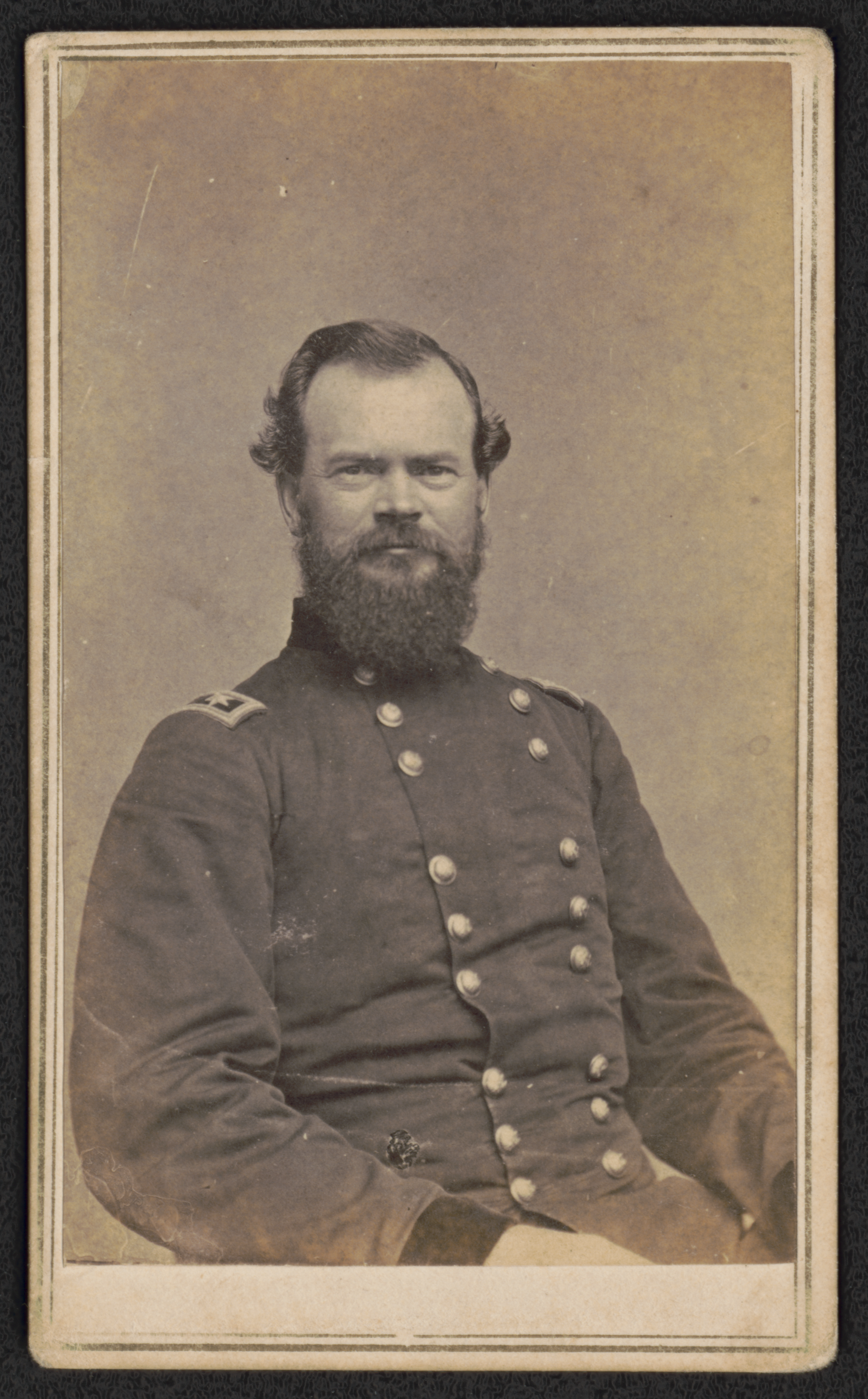
McPherson

James Birdseye McPherson (/məkˈfərsən/) (November 14, 1828 – July 22, 1864) was a career United States Army officer who served as a general in the Union Army during the American Civil War. McPherson was on the general staff of Henry Halleck and later of Ulysses S. Grant and was with Grant at the Battle of Shiloh. He was killed during the Battle of Atlanta, facing the army of his old West Point classmate John Bell Hood, who paid a warm tribute to his character. He was the second-highest-ranking Union officer killed in action during the war.

== Early life and career ==
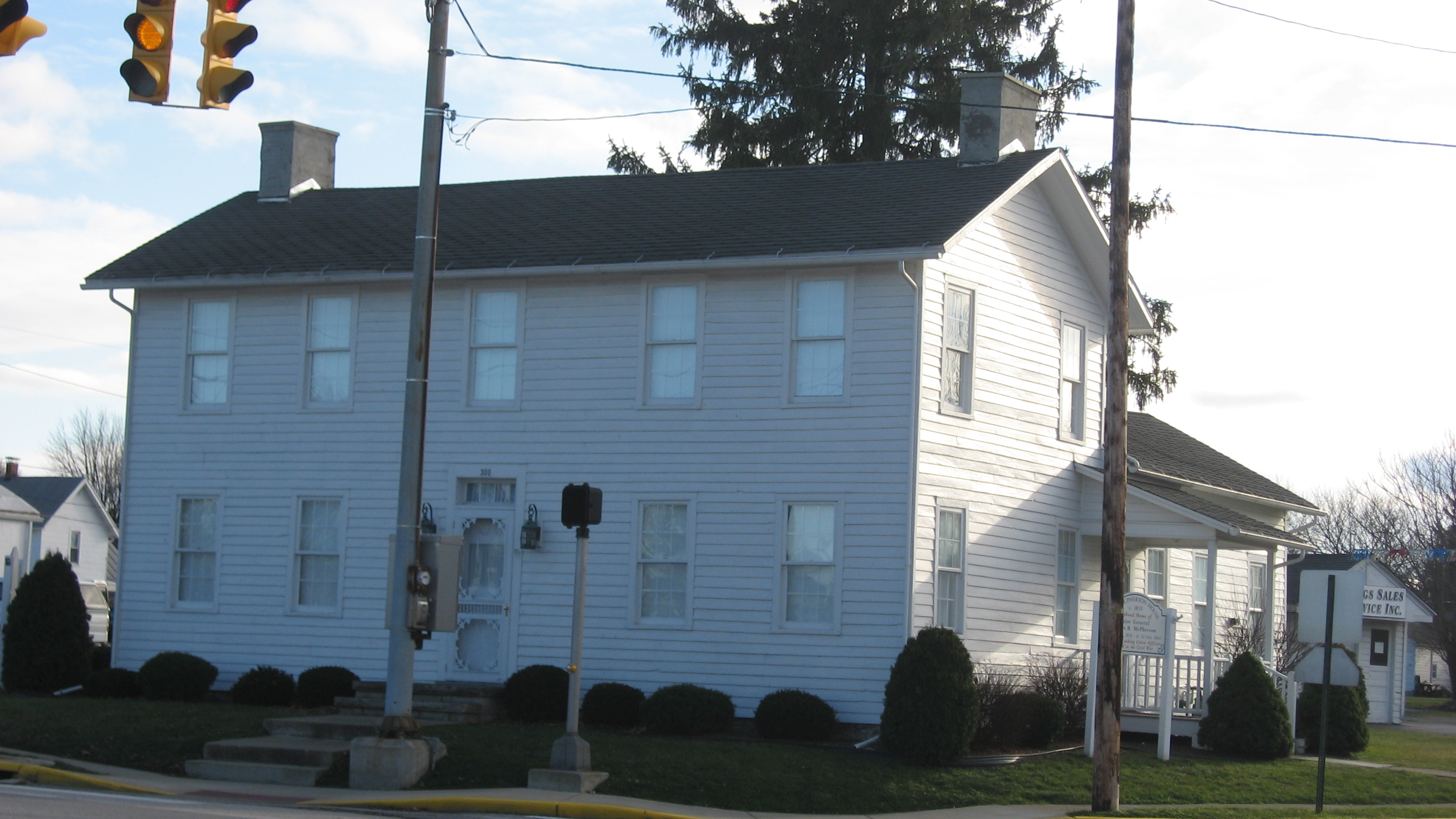
McPherson's house in Clyde

McPherson was born in Clyde, Ohio. He attended Norwalk Academy in Norwalk, Ohio, and graduated from the United States Military Academy at West Point in 1853, first in his class, which included Philip H. Sheridan, John M. Schofield, and John Bell Hood; Hood would oppose him later in the Western Theater. McPherson was directly appointed to the Corps of Engineers with the rank of brevet second lieutenant. For a year after his graduation, he was assistant instructor of practical engineering at the Military Academy, a position never before given to so young an officer.

From 1854 to 1857, McPherson was the assistant engineer upon the defenses of the harbor of New York and the improvement of the Hudson River. In 1857 he superintended the building of Fort Delaware, and in 1857–61 was superintending engineer of the construction of the defenses of Alcatraz Island, at San Francisco, California. He was promoted to first lieutenant in 1858.

In 1859, while in San Francisco, he met Emily Hoffman, a woman from a prominent merchant family in Baltimore who had come to California to help care for her sister's children. They soon became engaged and a wedding was planned, but ultimately put off by the onset of the Civil War.

== Civil War ==
At the start of the American Civil War, McPherson requested a transfer from California back east. He departed the state on August 1, 1861, and arrived soon after in New York. He requested a position on the staff of Maj. Gen. Henry W. Halleck, one of the senior Western commanders. Promoted to captain on August 6, he was sent to St. Louis, Missouri, serving under Halleck. Halleck appointed him to command of the Department of the West in November, where he was chosen aide-de-camp to Halleck while also being promoted to lieutenant colonel.

McPherson's career began rising after this assignment. He was a lieutenant colonel and the chief engineer in Brig. Gen. Ulysses S. Grant's army during the capture of forts Henry and Donelson in February 1862.

During the days that led up to the Battle of Shiloh, McPherson accompanied Sherman questioning people in the area and learned that the Confederates were bringing large numbers of troops from every direction by train to Corinth, Mississippi, which was itself an important railroad junction.

He was promoted to brigadier general on May 15 and served as military superintendent of the railroads in western Tennessee. On October 8 he was promoted to major general and was soon after given command of the XVII Corps in Grant's Army of the Tennessee.

In September 1862, McPherson assumed a position on the staff of General Grant. He briefly commanded an infantry brigade before being promoted to major general, rising to that position primarily due to the influence of Halleck and Grant. During Grant's Vicksburg Campaign, McPherson formed the Army of the Tennessee's right flank during the advance. On May 12, 1863, he was attacked by John Gregg at the Battle of Raymond. Though McPherson heavily outnumbered Gregg's single brigade with his entire corps, the rebels mounted a strong defense. Once the federal numbers became telling, Gregg retreated to Jackson.

Immediately after the siege of Vicksburg in which McPherson commanded the center, on Grant's recommendation, McPherson was confirmed a brigadier general in the regular army, dating from August 1, 1863. Soon after this promotion, McPherson led a column of infantry into Mississippi and repulsed the enemy at Canton.

On March 12, 1864, he was given command of the Army of the Tennessee, after its former commander, Maj. Gen. William T. Sherman, was promoted to command of all armies in the West. He then requested leave to go home and marry his fiancé Emily Hoffman in Baltimore, Maryland. His leave was initially granted, but quickly revoked by Sherman, who explained McPherson was needed for his upcoming Atlanta campaign. McPherson's army was the right wing of Sherman's army, alongside the Army of the Cumberland and the Army of the Ohio.

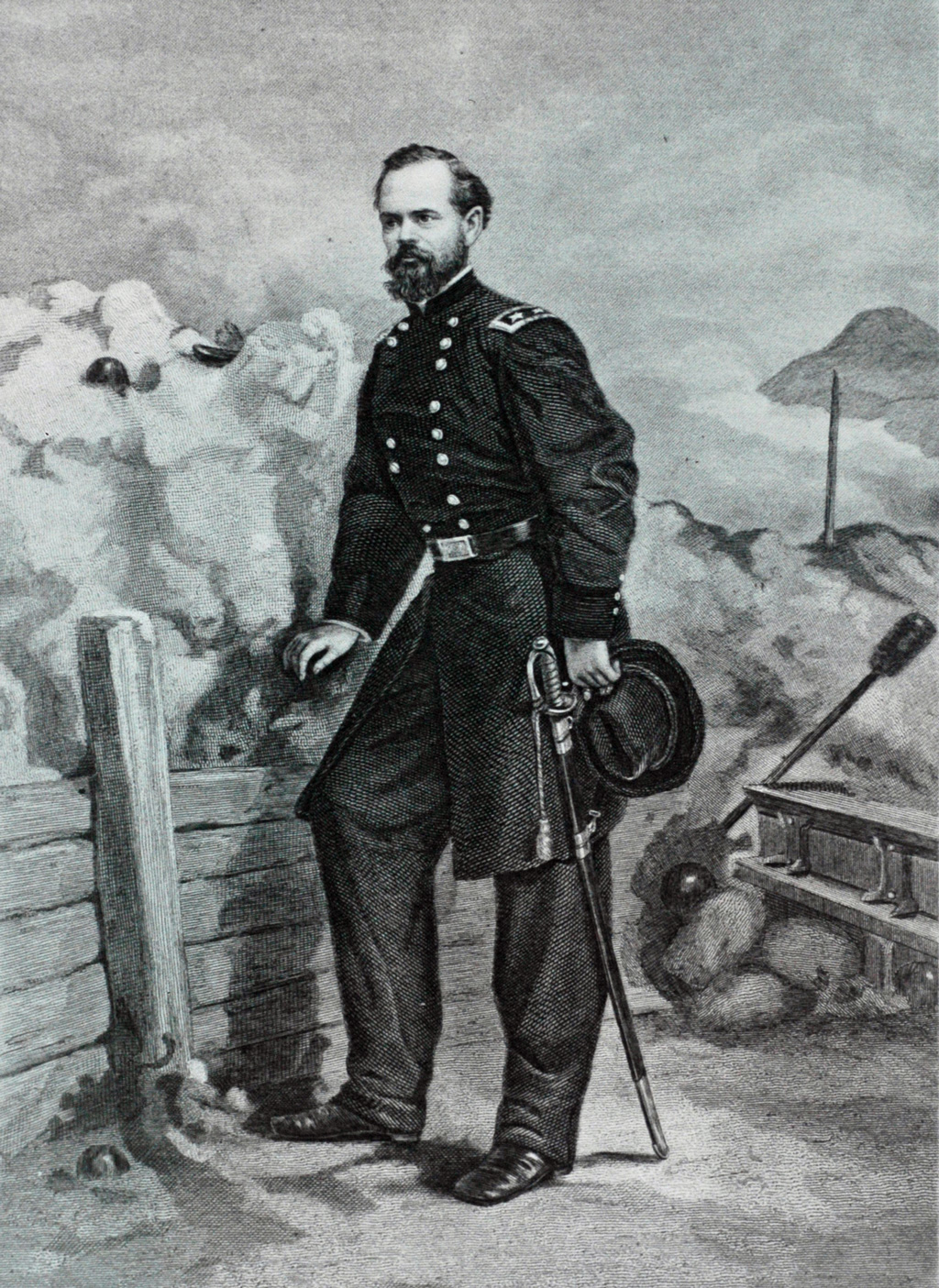
Lithograph of McPherson

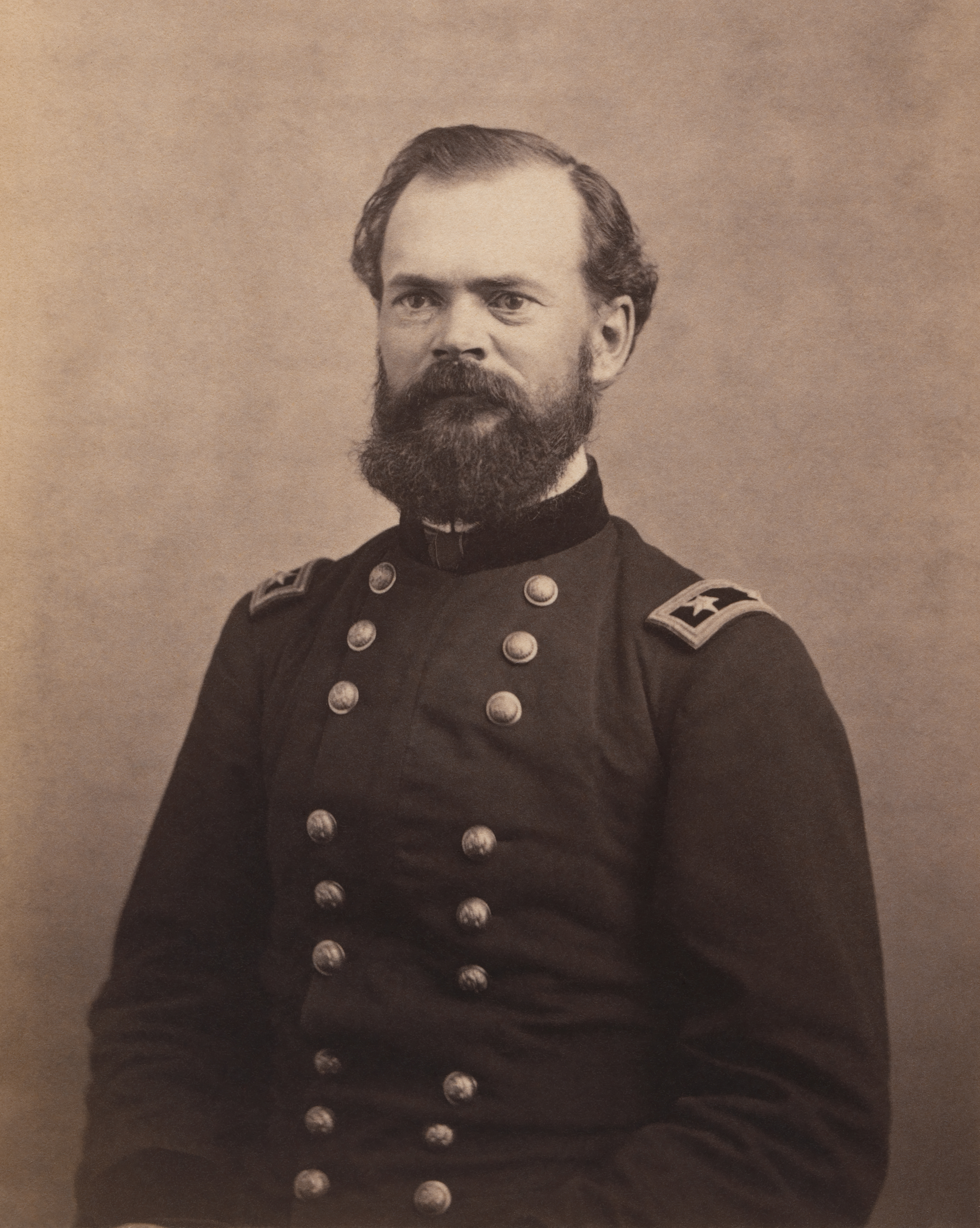
James Birdseye McPherson c. 1862 by Barr & Young

Sherman planned to have the bulk of his forces feint toward Dalton, Georgia, while McPherson would bear the brunt of Confederate General Joseph E. Johnston's attack, and attempt to trap them. However, the Confederate forces eventually escaped, and Sherman blamed McPherson (for being "slow"), although it was mainly faulty planning on Sherman's part that led to the escape. McPherson's troops followed the Confederates "vigorously", and were resupplied at Kingston, Georgia. The troops drew near Pumpkinvine Creek, where they attacked and drove the Confederates from Dallas, Georgia, even before Sherman's order to do so. Johnston and Sherman maneuvered against each other, until the Union tactical defeat at the Battle of Kennesaw Mountain. McPherson then tried a flanking maneuver at the Battle of Marietta, but that failed as well.

Confederate President Jefferson Davis became frustrated with Johnston's strategy of maneuver and retreat, and on July 17 replaced him with Lt. Gen. John Bell Hood. With the Union armies closing in on Atlanta, Hood first attacked George Henry Thomas's Army of the Cumberland north of the city on July 20, at Peachtree Creek, hoping to drive Thomas back before other forces could come to his aid. The attack failed. Then Hood's cavalry reported that the left flank of McPherson's Army of the Tennessee, east of Atlanta, was unprotected. Hood visualized a glorious replay of Jackson's famous flank attack at Chancellorsville and ordered a new attack. McPherson had advanced his troops into Decatur, Georgia, and from there, they moved onto high ground on Bald Hill overlooking Atlanta. Sherman believed that the Confederates had been defeated and were evacuating; however, McPherson rightly believed that they were moving to attack the Union left and rear. On July 22, while they were discussing this new development, however, four Confederate divisions under Lt. Gen. William J. Hardee flanked Union Maj. Gen. Grenville Dodge's XVI Corps. While McPherson was riding his horse toward his old XVII Corps, a line of Confederate skirmishers appeared, yelling "Halt!". McPherson raised his hand to his head as if to remove his hat, but suddenly wheeled his horse, attempting to escape. The Confederates opened fire and mortally wounded McPherson in the back. When the Confederate troops approached and asked his orderly who the downed officer was, the aide replied "Sir, it is General McPherson. You have killed the best man in our army." This was early in the one-day Battle of Atlanta, part of the Atlanta campaign that led to the surrender of Atlanta a month later. General Otis Howard succeeded him as commander of the Army and Department of the Tennessee.

== Aftermath and tributes ==
McPherson was the second-highest-ranking Union officer to be killed in action during the war (the highest ranking was John Sedgwick).

When Sherman received word of McPherson's death, he openly wept. He then penned a letter to Emily Hoffman in Baltimore, stating:

My Dear Young Lady, A letter from your Mother to General Barry on my Staff reminds me that I owe you heartfelt sympathy and a sacred duty of recording the fame of one of our Country's brightest and most glorious Characters. I yield to none on Earth but yourself the right to excel me in lamentations for our Dead Hero. Why should death's darts reach the young and brilliant instead of older men who could better have been spared?

Hoffman never recovered from his death, living a quiet and lonely life until her death in 1891.

Sherman declared in his official report:

His public enemies, even the men who directed the fatal shot, never spoke or wrote of him without expressions of marked respect; those whom he commanded loved him even to idolatry; and I, his associate and commander, fail in words adequate to express my opinion of his great worth. I feel assured that every patriot in America, on hearing this sad news, will feel a sense of personal loss, and the country generally will realize that we have lost, not only an able military leader, but a man who, had he survived, was qualified to heal the national strife which has been raised by designing and ambitious men.

McPherson's adversary, John Bell Hood, wrote,

I will record the death of my classmate and boyhood friend, General James B. McPherson, the announcement of which caused me sincere sorrow. Since we had graduated in 1853, and had each been ordered off on duty in different directions, it has not been our fortune to meet. Neither the years nor the difference of sentiment that had led us to range ourselves on opposite sides in the war had lessened my friendship; indeed the attachment formed in early youth was strengthened by my admiration and gratitude for his conduct toward our people in the vicinity of Vicksburg. His considerate and kind treatment of them stood in bright contrast to the course pursued by many Federal officers.

== Legacy ==
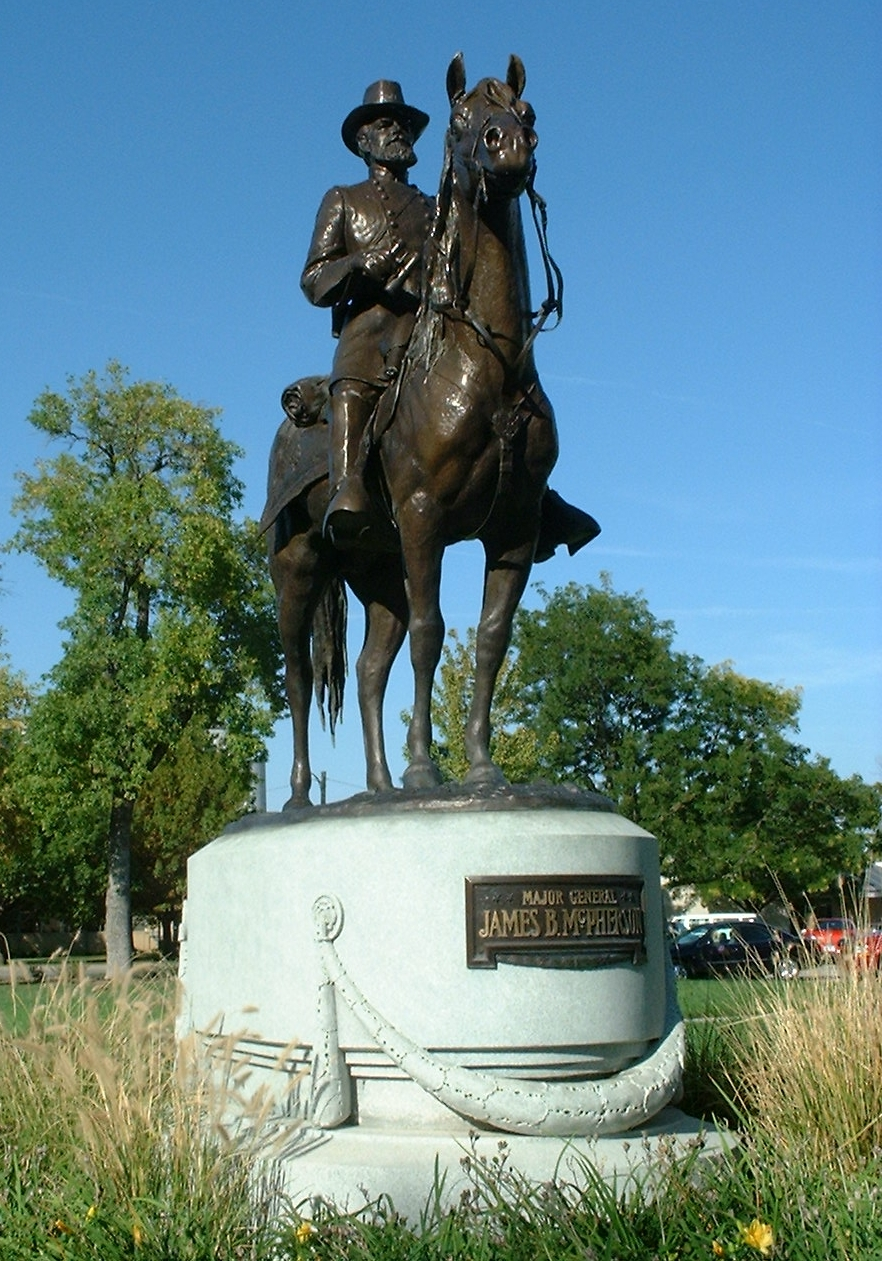
Sculpture in McPherson, Kansas

Fort McPherson in Atlanta, Georgia, area was named in Gen. McPherson's honor on February 20, 1866.

McPherson Square in Washington, D.C., and its Metro rail station are named in the general's honor. At the center of the square is a statue of McPherson on horseback.

McPherson County, Kansas, and the town of McPherson, Kansas, are named in his honor. McPherson Township, Blue Earth County, Minnesota is also named for him. There is also an equestrian statue of him in the park across from the McPherson County Courthouse.

McPherson County, South Dakota, founded in 1873, and organized in 1885, was also named in his honor.

McPherson County, Nebraska, and Fort McPherson National Cemetery, located near Maxwell, Nebraska, were named in his honor, and the National Cemetery was established on March 3, 1873. This 20-acre (81,000 m^{2}) cemetery is located two miles (3 km) south of Interstate 80, near Exit 190.

A monument marking the death of McPherson was established at the location of his death in East Atlanta, at the intersection of McPherson Avenue and Monument Avenue. McPherson Avenue in Atlanta was named for him. The spot is marked by a Union cannon once placed at Glenwood Road and Flat Shoals Road to protect the flank of the front line and return fire against the defensive positions built by Lemuel P. Grant.

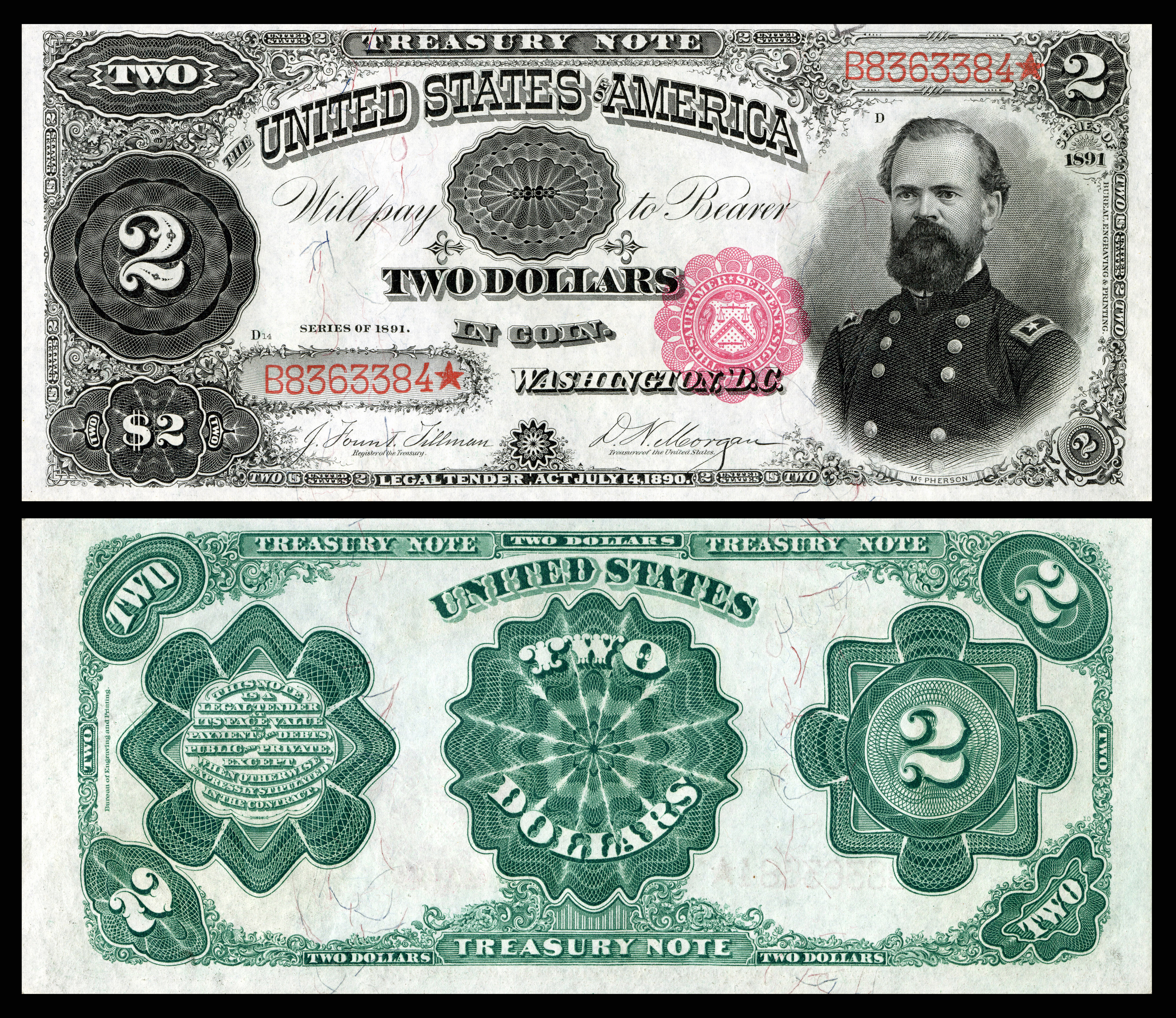
Memorialized on the 1891 $2 Treasury Note, and one of 53 people depicted on United States banknotes

A distinctive engraved portrait of McPherson appeared on U.S. paper money in 1890 and 1891. The bills are called "treasury notes" or "coin notes" and are widely collected today because of their fine, detailed engraving. The $2 McPherson "fancyback" note of 1890, with an estimated 600–900 in existence relative to the 4.9 million printed, ranks as number 15 in the "100 Greatest American Currency Notes" compiled by Bowers and Sundman (2006).

The James B. McPherson Elementary School in the Ravenswood area of Chicago, Illinois, was named for McPherson.

In his home town of Clyde, Ohio, James B. McPherson Highway (US 20) was dedicated and named in his honor on August 9, 1941; the designation was extended across the state in 1973. The McPherson Middle School and McPherson Cemetery are named for him as well. The cemetery was named Evergreen Cemetery, but was renamed McPherson Cemetery on December 15, 1868. There is also a monument that was erected in his honor on July 22, 1881, at the McPherson Cemetery. President Rutherford B. Hayes gave the dedication speech during the ceremony for the monument. There were many US Civil War officers in attendance for the dedication of the monument, including General William Tecumseh Sherman. His childhood home on E. Maple Street in Clyde, Ohio is now owned by the Clyde Heritage League and is a museum that can be toured.

== In popular media ==
The alternate history novel Never Call Retreat: Lee and Grant: The Final Victory, by Newt Gingrich, and William R. Forstchen, includes McPherson as a major character.

In another alternate history, If the South Had Won the Civil War by MacKinlay Kantor – in which the war ended in 1863 with a decisive Confederate victory – McPherson survived to become President of the United States for two terms in the 1880s and strongly pursue a line of reconciliation with the Confederate States.

McPherson and his hat also feature prominently in the book Map of Thieves, by Michael Karpovage.

McPherson has been mentioned several times on the Drunken Peasants podcast by host TJ Kirk who has stated he is a relative of McPherson's.

The 1939 film Union Pacific depicts a (fictional) steam locomotive named after McPherson.

== See also ==
- List of American Civil War generals (Union)
- Fort Date Creek
