= Third Battle of Murfreesboro =

Battle of the American Civil War

Coordinates: 35.8689°N 86.4593°W

- Part of the American Civil War
| Date | December 5–7, 1864 |
| Location | Murfreesboro, Tennessee |
| Result | Union victory; see battle |

Belligerents
| United States (Union) | Confederate States |

Commanders and leaders
| (United States) Lovell H. Rousseau (United States) Robert H. Milroy | Nathan B. Forrest |

Units involved
| Post of Murfreesboro | Forrest's Cavalry Corps |

Strength
| 8,000 | 7,000 |

Casualties and losses
| 225 | 197 |

The Third Battle of Murfreesboro, also known as the Battle of Wilkinson Pike or the Battle of the Cedars, was fought December 5–7, 1864, in Rutherford County, Tennessee, as part of the Franklin-Nashville Campaign of the American Civil War.

== Background ==
In a last, desperate attempt to force Maj. Gen. William T. Sherman's Union army out of Georgia, Gen. John Bell Hood led the Army of Tennessee north toward Nashville in November 1864. After suffering terrible losses at Franklin, he continued toward Nashville. Hood recognized that Federal forces at Murfreesboro posed a significant threat to his right flank, his supply line and his possible retreat route. On December 4, 1864 he sent Maj. Gen. Nathan B. Forrest with two cavalry divisions and Maj. Gen. William B. Bate's infantry division to Murfreesboro, Tennessee.

== Opposing forces ==
=== Union ===
District of Tennessee – Maj. Gen. Lovell H. Rousseau

- Defenses of the Nashville & Chattanooga Railroad – Maj. Gen. Robert H. Milroy
  - 1st Provisional Brigade – Col. Minor T. Thomas
    - 8th Minnesota Infantry: Col. Minor T. Thomas, Ltc Henry C. Rogers
    - 61st Illinois Infantry: Lt. Col. Daniel Grass
    - 174th Ohio Infantry: Col. John S. Jones
    - 181st Ohio Infantry: Col. John O'Dowd
    - 3rd Michigan Infantry Regiment (reorganized): Col. Moses Barrett Houghton
    - 4th Michigan Infantry Regiment (reorganized): Col. Jarius William Hall
    - 13th New York Light Artillery: Cpt. Henry Bundy
  - 2nd Provisional Brigade (Post of Tullahoma) – Col. Edward Anderson
    - 177th Ohio Infantry: Col. Arthur T. Wilcox
    - 178th Ohio Infantry: Col. Joab A. Stafford
    - 12th Indiana Cavalry: Col. Edward Anderson
    - 5th Tennessee Cavalry: Col. William Brickly Stokes

=== Confederate ===
Forrest's Cavalry Corps: Maj. Gen. Nathan B. Forrest

- Buford's Division: Brig. Gen. Abraham Buford
  - Bell's Brigade: Col. Tyree H. Bell
    - 2nd/22nd Tennessee Cavalry (Barteau's)
    - 19th Tennessee Cavalry
    - 20th Tennessee Cavalry: Col Robert M. Russell
    - 21st Tennessee Cavalry
    - Nixon's (22nd) Tennessee Cavalry
  - Crossland's Brigade: Col. Edward Crossland
    - 3rd Kentucky Mounted Infantry
    - 7th Kentucky Mounted Infantry
    - 8th Kentucky Mounted Infantry
    - 12th Kentucky Cavalry
    - Huey's Kentucky Battalion
- Jackson's Division: Brig. Gen. William Hicks Jackson
  - Armstrong's Brigade: Brig. Gen. Frank C. Armstrong
    - 1st Mississippi Cavalry
    - 2nd Mississippi Cavalry
    - 28th Mississippi Cavalry
    - 2nd Mississippi Partisan Rangers
  - Ross's Brigade: Brig. Gen. Lawrence S. Ross
    - 3rd Texas Cavalry
    - 6th Texas Cavalry
    - 9th Texas Cavalry
    - (1st Texas Legion) 27th Texas Cavalry

Attached Infantry:

- (From Cheatham's Corps) Bate's Division: MG William B. Bate
  - Tyler's/Smith’s Brigade: BG Thomas Benton Smith
    - 37th Georgia
    - 4th Georgia Sharpshooters Battalion
    - 2nd Tennessee
    - 10th Tennessee
    - 20th Tennessee
    - 37th Tennessee
  - Finley's/Bullock’s Brigade: BG Robert Bullock (w); Major Jacob A. Lash
    - 1st-3rd Florida
    - 4th Florida & 1st Florida Cavalry (dismounted): Major Jacob A. Lash
    - 6th Florida
    - 7th Florida
  - Jackson's Brigade: BG Henry R. Jackson
    - 36th Georgia (1st Georgia) Confederate
    - 25th Georgia
    - 29th Georgia
    - 30th Georgia
    - 66th Georgia
    - 1st Georgia Sharpshooters Battalion
- (From Lee’s Corps) Stevenson's Division: BG Joseph B. Palmer
  - Brown's & Reynolds' Brigade: BG Joseph B. Palmer
    - 58th North Carolina
    - 60th North Carolina
    - 54th Virginia
    - 63rd Virginia
    - 3rd-18th Tennessee
    - 23rd-26th-45th Tennessee: Col Anderson Searcy
    - 32nd Tennessee: Col John P. McGuire
- (From Stewart’s Corps) French's Division: BG Claudius W. Sears
  - Sears' Brigade: BG Claudius W. Sears
    - 4th Mississippi
    - 35th Mississippi
    - 36th Mississippi
    - 39th Mississippi
    - 46th Mississippi
    - 7th Mississippi Battalion

Artillery:

- Slocomb's Louisiana Battery: Lt. Joseph E. Chalaron

== Battle ==
On December 2, Hood had ordered Bate to destroy the railroad and blockhouses between Murfreesboro and Nashville and join Forrest for further operations. On December 4, Bate's division attacked Blockhouse No. 7 protecting the railroad crossing at Overall's Creek, but Union forces fought it off. On the morning of December 5, Forrest marched toward Murfreesboro in two columns, one to attack the fort on the hill and the other to take Blockhouse No. 4, both at La Vergne. Forrest demanded the garrisons at both locations surrender, which they did. Outside La Vergne, Forrest joined Bate's division and the command advanced on to Murfreesboro along two roads, driving the Union forces into their Fortress Rosecrans fortifications, then encamped in the city outskirts for the night. The next morning, on December 6, fighting flared for a couple of hours, but the Union troops ceased firing and both sides glared at each other for the rest of the day. Brig. Gen. Claudius W. Sears's and Brig. Gen. Joseph B. Palmer's infantry brigades joined Forrest's command in the evening, further increasing his numbers.

On the morning of December 7, Maj. Gen. Lovell Rousseau, commanding all of the forces at Murfreesboro, sent two brigades out under Brig. Gen. Robert H. Milroy on the Salem Pike to feel out the enemy. These brigades were led by Col. Minor T. Thomas, a veteran of the Dakota War, and Col. Edward Anderson. With Thomas' brigade forming the first line of battle and Anderson forming the second, Milroy engaged the Confederates and fighting continued. At one point some of Bate's troops broke and ran. Forrest "seized the colors of the retreating troops and endeavored to rally them". Bate was equally unsuccessful. The rest of Forrest's command conducted an orderly retreat from the field and encamped for the night outside Murfreesboro. Forrest had destroyed railroad track, blockhouses, and some homes and generally disrupted Union operations in the area. More importantly, he succeeded in keeping Rousseau confined to Murfreesboro and kept the important supply line and retreat route open.

== Sources ==
- Eicher, John H., and David J. Eicher. Civil War High Commands. Stanford, CA: Stanford University Press, 2001. ISBN 0-8047-3641-3.
- National Park Service battle description
