= William Tennent Stockton =

American military officer and politician (1812–1869)

William T. Stockton
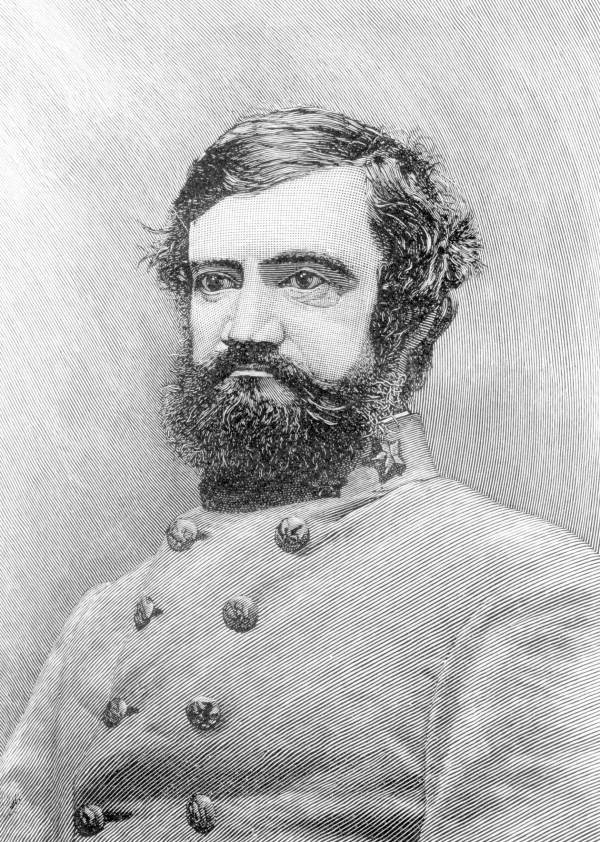
- Sketch of Stockton, c. 1861–1865
- Born: October 9, 1812; Philadelphia, Pennsylvania, U.S.
- Died: March 4, 1869 (aged 56); Quincy, Florida, U.S.
- Education: West Point
- Occupations: Soldier; politician
- Spouses: Sarah Willie Strange; Julia Elizabeth Telfair (m. 1845)
- Children: 9
- Relatives: Gilchrist Baker Stockton (grandson); Richard Stockton (great uncle)

William Tennent Stockton (October 9, 1812 – March 4, 1869) was an American soldier and mayor of Quincy, Florida. He served for the U.S. during the Second Seminole War and for the Confederacy during the American Civil War.

== Early life and ancestry ==
William Tennent Stockton was born on October 9, 1812, in Philadelphia, Pennsylvania.

Stockton's ancestors had originally emigrated to the Thirteen Colonies in the 1660s. His grandfather, Rev. Philip Stockton, was the younger brother of Richard Stockton, a signer of the Declaration of Independence. The family-owned land in New Jersey would eventually become Princeton University. One of William's brothers, Richard Lucius Stockton, served with Davy Crockett's Tennessee Mounted Volunteers until his death at the fall of the Alamo.

Stockton was an accomplished hunter and had several articles published under the pen name "Cor de Chasse", in the Spirit of the Times, a weekly newspaper published in New York City. The articles were mostly about hunting in Florida, especially deer.

== Early military career ==
In 1834, Stockton graduated from West Point, 8th in his class. After graduating, Stockton was first stationed at the Augusta Arsenal in Georgia, and then at Fort Macomb in Louisiana, as a second lieutenant of the Second U.S. Artillery. During the Second Seminole War, Stockton served on topographical duty in Florida from 1835 to 1836. During the Seminole war, he saw action during a skirmish at Camp Izard and the battle at Oloklikaha.

== Family and Quincy, Florida ==
In the early 1840s, Stockton and his brother Philip moved to Quincy to open and operate a stagecoach line that ran mail between Mobile, Alabama, and St. Augustine, Florida. He then went on to serve as mayor of Quincy for several years in the 1850s to early 1860s.

On December 23, 1845, Stockton married Julia Telfair. They had nine children together.

== American Civil War ==
Prior to the Civil War, Stockton served in the state militia as a colonel. Following Florida's secession in January 1861, Stockton raised a company of cavalry out of Quincy called the Gadsden Dragoons. He was eventually appointed as captain of the 1st Florida Cavalry Regiment. Despite being elected as captain of the company, Stockton was not present at its organization in 1861. Instead, he traveled from the various camps around Florida as a representative of the Confederate States War Department. His job was to aid in the mustering of troops around the state.

At the Battle of Chickamauga, Stockton was wounded while leading his men. (Note: In the Coddington article, Stockton's wound is said to have been a "minor yet painful wound to the face". While the Stockton book states that he was "seriously wounded" at Chickamauga.)

During the Chattanooga campaign, the Florida Brigade of the Army of Tennessee, which included the now dismounted 1st Cavalry, were stationed on picket duty at the base of Missionary Ridge when Union forces attacked on November 25, 1863. Stockton said that because he was still recovering from the wound he had incurred at Chickamauga, he was "unable from exhaustion, to leave the field". He was captured by Federal troops and imprisoned at Johnson's Island for the duration of the war. He was released in July 1865.

== Death and legacy ==
Stockton died of an unspecified illness on March 4, 1869, at his home in Quincy. At least one source seems to indicate that Stockton never fully recovered from his time spent as a prisoner of war. Following his death, Julia moved the family to Jacksonville. One of his grandsons was Gilchrist Baker Stockton, a rear-admiral and American Envoy to Austria from 1930 to 1933.
