= Johnson's Island =

Historic site in Ottawa County, Ohio

- Johnson Island Civil War Prison and Fort Site
- U.S. National Register of Historic Places
- U.S. National Historic Landmark
- The cemetery at Johnson's Island

- Location within Ohio Location within the United States
- Location: Johnson's Island, Marblehead, Ottawa County, Ohio, United States
- Coordinates: 41.4963°N 82.7346°W
- Built: 1862
- Architect: Hoffman, Col. William H.; Et al.
- NRHP reference No.: 75001514

Significant dates
- Added to NRHP: March 27, 1975
- Designated NHL: June 21, 1990

Johnson's Island Prison
- Part of American Civil War prison camps
- Johnson's Island, Marblehead, Ottawa County, Ohio, United States
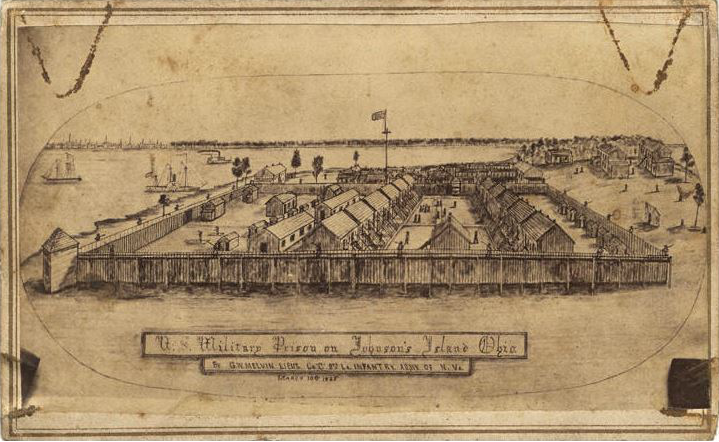
- Johnson's Island Prison barracks enclosed by a stockade in 1865

Site information
- Type: Union Prison Camp
- Owner: L. B. Johnson, U.S. Government
- Controlled by: Union Army

Site history
- In use: 1862–1865
- Demolished: 1865
- Battles/wars: American Civil War

Garrison information
- Occupants: Union soldiers, Confederate officer prisoners of war

Johnson's Island is a 300-acre (120 ha) island in Sandusky Bay, located on the coast of Lake Erie, 3 miles (4.8 km) from the city of Sandusky, Ohio. It was the site of a prisoner-of-war camp for Confederate officers captured during the American Civil War. Initially, Johnson's Island was the only Union prison camp exclusively for Confederate officers but eventually it held privates, political prisoners, persons sentenced to court martial, and spies. Civilians who were arrested as guerrillas, or bushwhackers, were also imprisoned on the island. During its three years of operation, more than 15,000 men were incarcerated there.

The island was named after L. B. Johnson, the owner of the island beginning about 1852. It was initially named 'Bull's Island' around 1809 by its first owner, Epaphras W. Bull (later misspelled "Epaproditus" Bull, by local historians.)

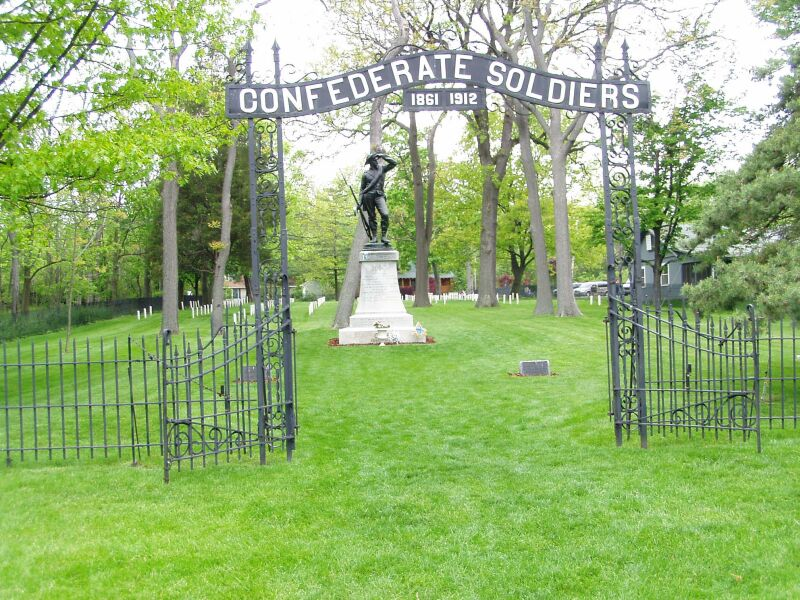

== Civil War years ==
In late 1861, U.S. officials selected Johnson's Island as the site for a prison camp to hold up to 2,500 captured Confederate officers. The island offered easy access by ship for supplies to construct and maintain a prison and its population. Sandusky Bay offered more protection from the elements than other nearby islands, which were also closer to Canada in case of a prison break. Woods of hickory and oak trees could provide lumber and fuel. The U.S. government leased half the island from private owner Leonard B. Johnson for $500 a year and carefully controlled access to the island for the duration of the war.

The 16.5-acre (6.7 ha) prison opened in April 1862. A 15-foot-high (5 m) wooden stockade surrounded 12 two-story prisoner housing barracks, a hospital, latrines, sutler's stand, three wells, a pest house, and two large mess halls (added in August 1864). More than 40 buildings stood outside the prison walls, including barns, stables, a limekiln, forts, barracks for officers, and a powder magazine. They were used by the 128th Ohio Infantry Regiment, which guarded the prison. The island housed officers, some of whom received money from home to purchase goods offered at the sutler's store, run by those who followed the army and sold supplies to the soldiers. The prisoners had a lively community, with amateur theatrical performances, publishing, and crafts projects available.

After the unraveling of a Confederate espionage ring that had conspired to seize the Great Lakes warship USS Michigan and a mass breakout of prisoners, Forts Johnson and Hill were constructed over the winter of 1864–65. In the war's final months, the forts became operational in March 1865, when the prisoner population peaked at 3,200.

Over 15,000 men passed through Johnson's Island until it was closed in September 1865. About 200 prisoners died due to the harsh Ohio winters, food and fuel shortages, and disease. 206 were buried in the Confederate Cemetery located on the island. The cemetery was purchased in 1908 by the United Daughters of the Confederacy of Cincinnati. Johnson's Island had one of the lowest mortality rates of any Civil War prison. Confederates made many escape attempts, including efforts by some to walk across the frozen Lake Erie to freedom in Canada, but only a handful of escapes were successful.

== Post Civil War ==
After the war, the prison camp was abandoned. Most of the buildings were auctioned off by the United States Army, and some were razed after falling into disrepair. The last antebellum house burned down in 1901. Circa 1894, a summer resort was established at the eastern end of the island, but its pavilion burned in 1897, and although the pavilion was later rebuilt, the resort failed. The land was used for farming and rock quarrying. Subsequently, many lakeside homes were built, and the island was developed with two subdivisions. As a result of this development, most of the Civil War-related sites have been razed.

On June 8, 1910, Moses Ezekiel's statue Southern (or the Lookout), a monument to the Confederate prisoners-of-war on the island, was unveiled.

In 1990, Johnson's Island was designated a National Historic Landmark. A causeway was built to connect it with the mainland. The Confederate cemetery and Fort Hill are accessible to the public. Ground-penetrating radar studies have proved that several graves lie outside the cemetery fence. Heidelberg University conducts yearly archeology digs at the prison site.

The Friends and Descendants of Johnson's Island Civil War Prison was formed in 2001 to help preserve, interpret, and research the Johnson's Island Prison site. In conjunction with Heidelberg University, the Friends have sponsored educational and research programming at this National Historic Landmark.

== Notable inmates ==
Several well-known Confederates were imprisoned on Johnson's Island.

- Isaac R. Trimble (1802–1888), Confederate major general.
- James J. Archer (1817–1864), Confederate brigadier general.
- William Beall (1825–1883), Confederate brigadier general.
- Thomas Benton Smith (1838–1923), Confederate brigadier general.
- Edward "Allegheny" Johnson (1816–1873), Confederate major general.
- M. Jeff Thompson (1826–1876), Missouri State Guard brigadier general.
- John S. Marmaduke (1833–1887), Confederate major general.
- William Lewis Cabell (1827–1911), Confederate brigadier general.
- Christopher Columbus Nash (1838–1922), Confederate soldier, guerilla militant.
- John Marshall Stone (1830–1900), Confederate colonel.
- James Steptoe Johnston (1843–1924), Confederate lieutenant.
- William Tennent Stockton (1812-1869), Confederate colonel, 1st Florida Cavalry Regiment.

== See also ==
- American Civil War prison camps
- Prisoner of war mail
- Davids Island (New York)
- Camp Chase, Columbus Ohio
