= Gilchrist Baker Stockton =

American politician and diplomat

Rear Admiral Gilchrist Baker Stockton

25th United States Ambassador to Austria-Hungary
- In office May 15, 1930 – September 21, 1933
- President: Herbert Hoover; Franklin D. Roosevelt
- Preceded by: Albert Henry Washburn
- Succeeded by: George Howard Earle III

Personal details
- Born: August 20, 1890 Jacksonville, Florida, U.S.
- Died: August 28, 1972 (aged 82) Jacksonville, Florida, U.S.
- Spouse: Mildred Lee Churchwell (m. 1925)
- Relations: James McNair Baker (grandfather)
- Children: Mildred (Mimi) Stockton Adams Gilchrist Baker Stockton Jr.
- Parent(s): John Noble Cummings Stockton; Fannie James Baker Stockton
- Education: Princeton University; Christ Church, Oxford

Rear Admiral Gilchrist Baker Stockton (August 20, 1890 – August 28, 1972) was a non-career appointee who served as the American Envoy Extraordinary and Minister Plenipotentiary to Austria from 1930 to 1933.

== Early life ==
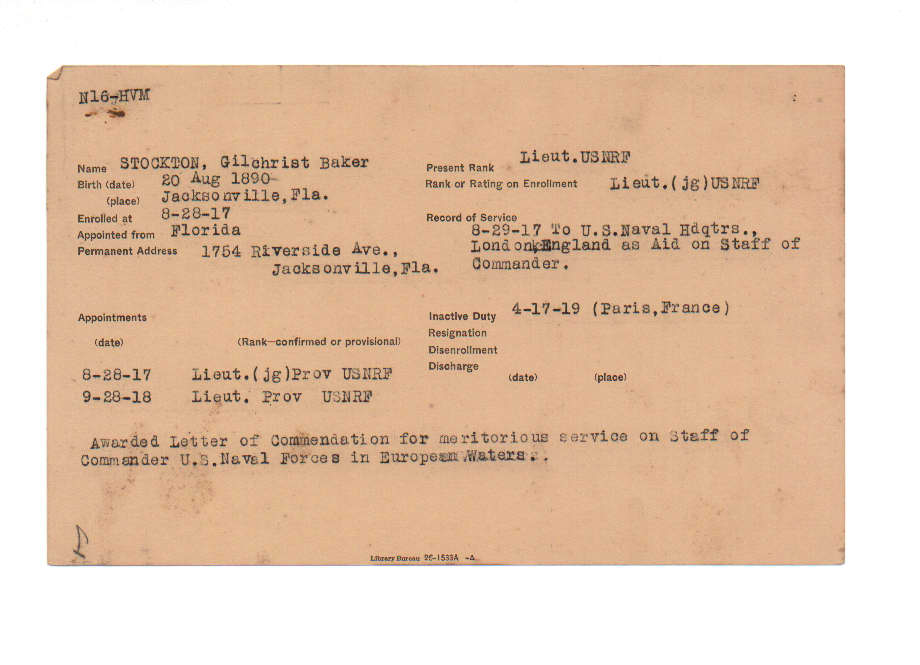
Gilchrist Baker Stockton's service card from the U.S. Navy during WWI.

Stockton was born on August 20, 1890, in Jacksonville, Florida. He was a son of John Noble Cummings Stockton (1857–1922) and Fannie James (née Baker) Stockton (1862–1950). His elder brother was William T. Stockton. His father, a Florida state legislator and who served as president of the National Bank of Tampa and the National Bank of Florida, was an unsuccessful democratic candidate to become a U.S. Senator from Florida.

His paternal grandparents were Julia Elizabeth (née Telfair) Stockton and William Tennent Stockton, who commanded the 1st Florida Cavalry of the Confederate army during the U.S. Civil War and also served as mayor of Quincy, Florida. His maternal grandparents were Fannie Perry (née Gilchrist) Baker and James McNair Baker, who was elected as a Senator from Florida to the Confederate States Senate, serving from 1862 until the Confederacy's demise in 1865. From 1865 to 1868, he served as an Associate Justice of the Supreme Court of Florida and was the namesake of Baker County, Florida.

After preparing to finish his final year at Princeton University, Stockton was awarded a Rhodes scholarship, like his elder brother, so he left Princeton to study at Christ Church, Oxford from 1914 to 1917, graduating with a B.A. degree, followed by an M.A. degree from Oxford in 1927.

== Career ==
From 1915 to 1916, he was a staff member of the Commission for Relief in Belgium followed by special assistant in London to U.S. Ambassador Walter Hines Page from 1916 to 1917. From 1917 to 1919, he served as aide to Admiral William S. Sims until he became Chief of Mission for the American Relief Administration in Austria from 1919 to 1920.

In 1928, he was a delegate from Florida to Democratic National Convention, On January 22, 1930, Republican President Herbert Hoover appointed Stockton as Envoy Extraordinary and Minister Plenipotentiary to Austria in Vienna. The existing Minister, Albert Henry Washburn, who bad been in the role since 1922, died in office three months later on April 29, 1930. On May 15, 1930, two weeks after Washburn's death, Stockton presented his credentials in Vienna, serving in that role until leaving his post on September 21, 1933. He was succeeded by President Roosevelt's appointee, George Howard Earle III.

Stockton served as executive vice-president of the Mail Order Association of America and as president of the Ortega Real Estate Company in Florida.

=== Military career ===
From 1917 to 1950, he served with the United States Navy Reserve. During World War I, he served on the staff of William S. Benson, the Chief of Naval Operations in London. In 1945, while Stockton was serving as a naval aide and liaison officer to Paul V. McNutt, the United States High Commissioner to the Philippines, Senator Charles O. Andrews sponsored Stockton's promotion from Captain to Rear Admiral.

== Personal life ==
On October 14, 1925, Stockton married Mildred Lee Churchwell (1902–1990), Class of 1921 - Wesleyan College, Macon, GA. She was the daughter of Augustus Franklin Churchwell and Florrie Dean Churchwell of Jacksonville, FL. Admiral Stockton and his wife were the parents of:

Mildred Stockton Adams (Mimi) 1927-1971, an environmental activist

Gilchrist Baker Stockton Jr., 1930 - 2006, who was born in Vienna and became an attorney.

In 1951, Stockton suffered a nervous breakdown. He recovered fully and went on to serve as President of the Ortega Company until his retirement.

Stockton died on August 28, 1972. He was buried at Evergreen Cemetery in Jacksonville, Florida.

Diplomatic posts
Preceded by Albert Henry Washburn	United States Minister to Austria; 1930–1933	Succeeded by George Howard Earle III
