= McPherson Cemetery =

Cemetery in Sandusky County, Ohio, United States

Coordinates: 41°18′36″N 82°58′4″W

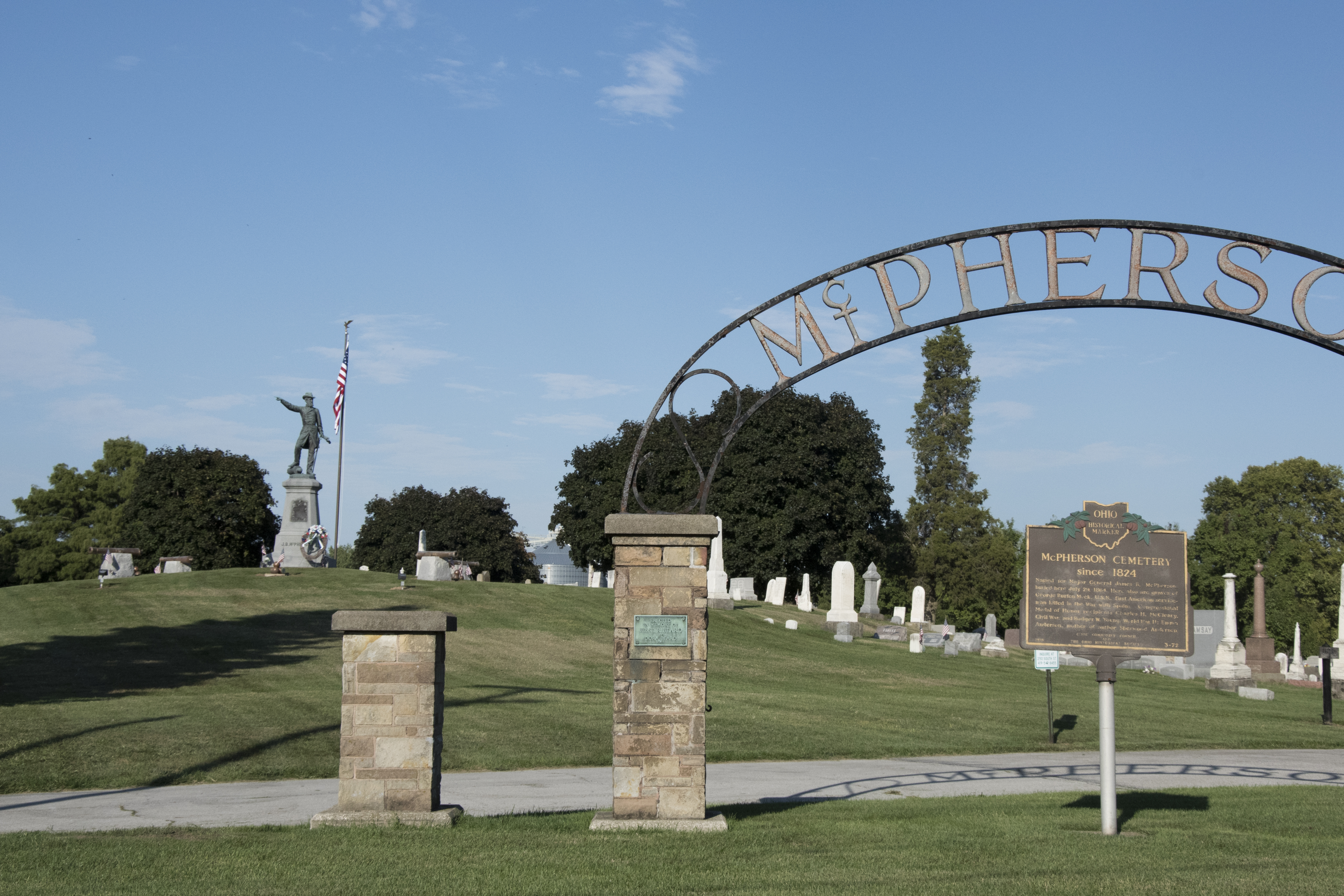
- Route 20 entrance way and arch, September 25th, 2016.
- Interactive map of McPherson Cemetery

Details
- Established: 1824
- Location: Sandusky County, Ohio
- Country: United States of America
- Type: Public
- Owned by: City of Clyde, Ohio
- Size: 30 acres (12 ha)
- No. of graves: ~7,462
- Find a Grave: McPherson Cemetery

McPherson Cemetery is a cemetery located in Clyde, Ohio, United States. McPherson Cemetery is known for being the burial place of the Union Army General James B. McPherson, for whom the cemetery is named.

== History ==
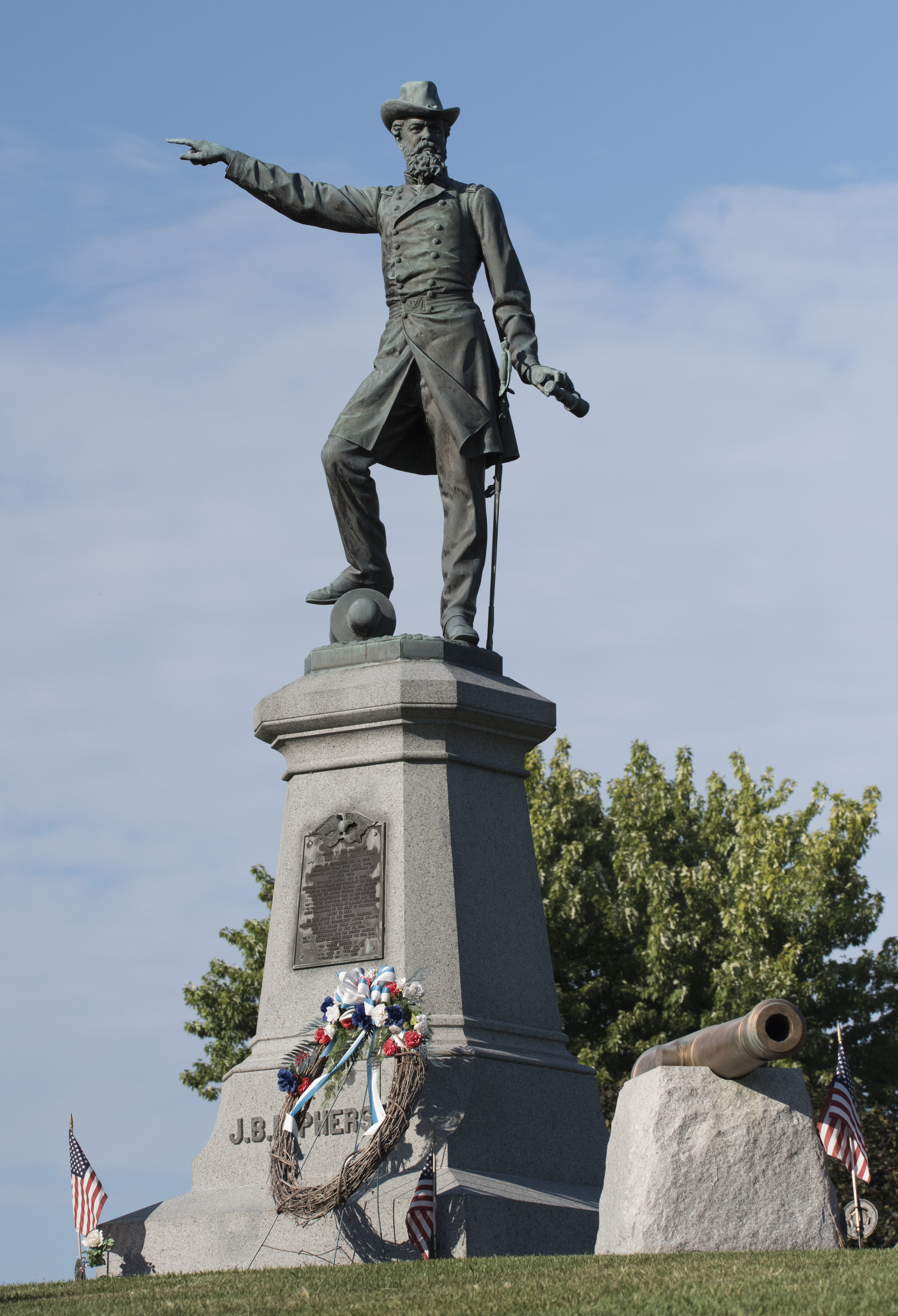
The bronze statue of General James B. McPherson sitting atop a hill near the cemetery entrance.

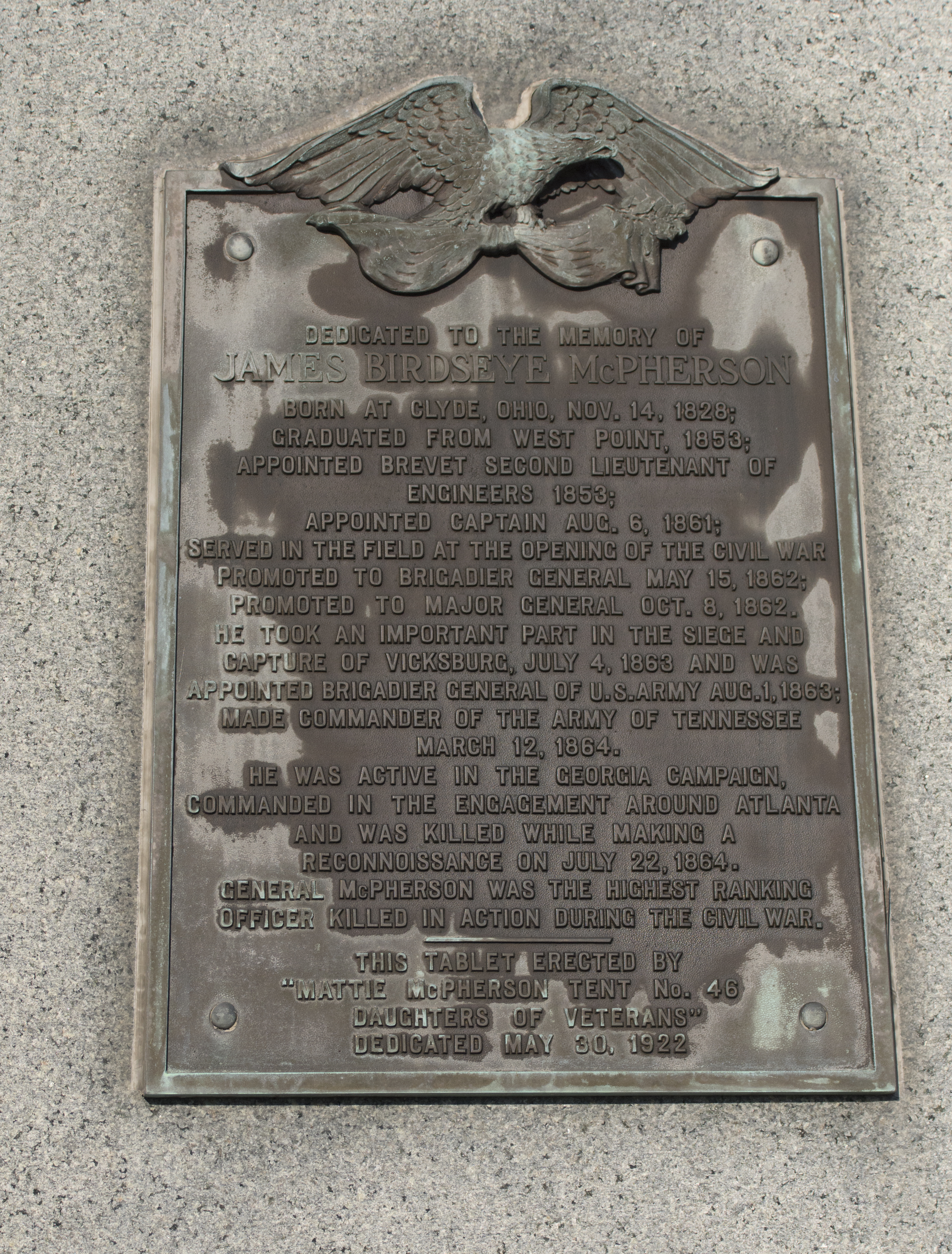
The dedication plaque below the statue.

In 2014, the 150th anniversary of McPherson's funeral was held at McPherson Cemetery.

=== Vandalism ===
There have been multiple cases of vandalism in McPherson Cemetery. The most notable example is the August 2010 persistent destruction of graves and items. Two teenagers were charged for this crime, who caused an estimated $100,000 of damage to the cemetery. In September, after the incident, Clyde's city manager Paul Fiser said that "the cemetery [was] 95 percent back to normal, thanks to the hard work of the parks and cemetery department."

=== Theft ===
In 2013, Jeffrey Huey, a Clyde citizen who is a self-proclaimed "art enthusiast", was detained for stealing 60 to 70 items from multiple different cemeteries in the area, including Oakland Cemetery in Sandusky and McPherson Cemetery.

== Notable burials ==
- James Birdseye McPherson
- George Burton Meek – Fireman 1st class USN – killed aboard the USS Winslow. Meek was believed to have been the first American killed by Spain during the Spanish–American War.
- Charles H. McCleary – Civil War Medal of Honor recipient. He served as a captain in the Union Army. He was awarded the CMOH as a first lieutenant in Company C, 72d Ohio Infantry for action on December 16, 1864, at Nashville, Tennessee. His citation reads "Capture of flag of 4th Florida Infantry (C.S.A.), while in advance of his lines."
- Rodger Wilton Young – World War 2 Medal of Honor recipient.
- Emma Anderson, mother of author Sherwood Anderson.

== Regulation ==
McPherson Cemetery has regulations on the amount of items that can be placed around gravestones, and where these items can be placed. No more than three items are allowed to be donated to a gravestone, unless they are not placed on the grass. Cemetery staff encourage people to keep items away from the lawn as much as possible to prevent damage to lawnmowing equipment and to the donated items.
