= 72nd Ohio Infantry Regiment =

- Active: October 1861 to September 11, 1865
- Country: United States
- Allegiance: Union
- Branch: Infantry
- Engagements: Battle of Shiloh; Siege of Corinth; Vicksburg Campaign; Siege of Vicksburg, May 19 & May 22 assaults; Siege of Jackson; Battle of Nashville; Battle of Fort Blakeley

The 72nd Ohio Infantry Regiment, sometimes 72nd Ohio Volunteer Infantry (or 72nd OVI) was an infantry regiment in the Union Army during the American Civil War.

== Service ==
The 72nd Ohio Infantry was organized in Fremont, Ohio October 1861 through February 1862 and mustered in for three years service under the command of Colonel Ralph Pomeroy Buckland.

The regiment was attached to District of Paducah, Kentucky, to March 1862. 4th Brigade, 5th Division, Army of the Tennessee, to May 1862. 3rd Brigade, 5th Division, Army of the Tennessee, to July 1862. 3rd Brigade, 5th Division, District of Memphis, Tennessee, to November 1862. 5th Brigade, 5th Division, District of Memphis, Right Wing, XIII Corps, Department of the Tennessee, November 1862. 3rd Brigade, 1st Division, District of Memphis, XIII Corps, to December 1862. 3rd Brigade, 8th Division, XVI Corps, to April 1863. 1st Brigade, 3rd Division, XV Corps, Army of the Tennessee, to December 1863. 1st Brigade, 1st Division, XVI Corps, to December 1864. 1st Brigade, 1st Division, Detachment Army of the Tennessee, Department of the Cumberland, to February 1865. 1st Brigade, 1st Division, XVI Corps, Military Division West Mississippi, to July 1865. Department of Mississippi to September 1865.

The 72nd Ohio Infantry mustered out of service at Vicksburg, Mississippi, on September 11, 1865.

== Detailed service ==
=== 1862 ===
Moved to Camp Chase, Ohio, January 24, then to Paducah, Ky. Moved from Paducah, Ky., to Savannah, Tenn., March 6–10, 1862. Expedition from Savannah to Yellow Creek, Miss., and occupation of Pittsburg Landing, Tenn., March 14–17. Crump's Landing April 4. Battle of Shiloh April 6–7. Advance on and siege of Corinth, Miss., April 29-May 30. Russell House, near Corinth, May 17. March to Memphis, Tenn., via La-Grange, Grand Junction, and Holly Springs June 1-July 21. Duty at Memphis, Tenn., until November. Grant's Central Mississippi Campaign, operations on the Mississippi Central Railroad, November 2, 1862, to January 12, 1863.

=== 1863 ===
Duty at White's Station until March 13. Ordered to Memphis, Tenn., then to Young's Point, La. Operations against Vicksburg, Miss., April 2-July 4. Moved to join army in rear of Vicksburg, Miss., May 2–14. Mississippi Springs May 13. Jackson, Miss., May 14. Siege of Vicksburg May 18-July 4. Assaults on Vicksburg May 19 and 22. Expedition to Mechanicsburg May 26-June 4. Advance on Jackson, Miss., July 5–10. Siege of Jackson July 10–17. Brandon Station July 19. Camp at Big Black until November. Expedition to Canton October 13–20. Bogue Chitto Creek October 17. Ordered to Memphis, Tenn., and guard Memphis & Charleston Railroad at Germantown until January 1864.

=== 1864 ===
Expedition to Wyatt's, Miss., February 6–18. Coldwater Ferry February 8. Near Senatobia February 8–9. Wyatt's February. Operations against Forrest in western Tennessee and Kentucky March 16-April 14. Defense of Paducah, Ky., April 14. Sturgis' Expedition to Ripley, Miss., April 30-May 2. Sturgis' Expedition to Guntown, Miss., June 1–13. Battle of Brices Cross Roads, near Guntown, June 10. Salem June 11. Smith's Expedition to Tupelo, Miss., July 5–21. Camargo's Cross Roads, Harrisburg, July 13. Harrisburg, near Tupelo, July 14–15. Old Town or Tishamingo Creek July 15. Smith's Expedition to Oxford, Miss., August 1–30. Abbeville August 23. Moved to Duvall's Bluff, Ark., September 1. March through Arkansas and Missouri in pursuit of Price September 17-November 16. Moved to Nashville, Tenn., November 21-December 1. Reconnaissance from Nashville December 6. Battle of Nashville December 15–16. During the battle, 1st Lt. Col. Charles H. McCleary of Company C captured the battle flag of the 4th Florida Infantry Regiment, for which he was awarded the Medal of Honor. Pursuit of Hood to the Tennessee River December 17–28.

=== 1865 ===
At Eastport, Miss., until February 1865. Moved to New Orleans, La., February 9–22. Campaign against Mobile, Ala., and its defenses March 17-April 12. Siege of Spanish Fort and Fort Blakely March 26-April 8. Assault and capture of Fort Blakely April 9. Occupation of Mobile April 12. March to Montgomery April 13–25, and duty there until May 10. Moved to Meridian, Miss., and duty there until September.

== Casualties ==
The regiment lost a total of 298 men during service; 4 officers and 56 enlisted men killed or mortally wounded, 2 officers and 236 enlisted men died of disease.

== Commanders ==
- Colonel Ralph Pomeroy Buckland – promoted to Brigadier General, November 29, 1862
- Lieutenant Colonel Herman Canfield – commanded at Battle of Shiloh and killed in action, April 6, 1862
- Lieutenant Colonel Leroy Crockett – commanded during Siege of Vicksburg; died December 10, 1863
- Lieutenant Colonel Charles G. Eaton – commanded during Siege of Vicksburg as major and at Battle of Nashville; mustered out with regiment September 11, 1865

== Notable members ==
- 1st Lieutenant Charles H. McCleary, Company C – Medal of Honor recipient for action at the Battle of Nashville, December 16, 1864.

== See also ==
- List of Ohio Civil War units
- Ohio in the Civil War
