= James McNair Baker =

American judge

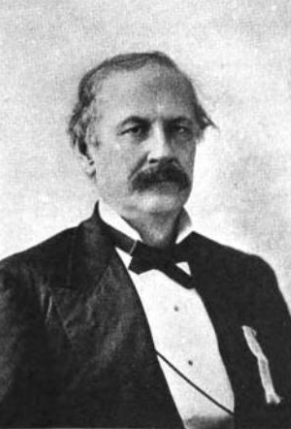

Confederate States Senator from Florida
- In office February 18, 1862 – May 10, 1865
- Preceded by: Constituency established
- Succeeded by: Constituency abolished

Personal details
- Born: July 20, 1821 Robeson County, North Carolina, U.S.
- Died: June 20, 1892 (aged 70) Jacksonville, Florida, U.S.
- Party: Democratic; Know Nothing; Whig
- Spouse: Fanny Gilchrist (m. 1859)
- Relations: Gilchrist Baker Stockton (grandson)
- Children: 5
- Education: Davidson College

James McNair Baker (July 20, 1821 – June 20, 1892) was a lawyer, politician, and state senator from Florida in the Confederate Congress during the American Civil War.

== Biography ==
Baker was born in Robeson County, North Carolina, a son of Archibald S. Baker and Catherine McCallum. He graduated from Davidson College in Davidson, North Carolina, in 1844. His family has long been associated with the college, and the Baker Sports Complex there is named for them.

Baker set up a law practice in Lumberton, North Carolina. After a bout with typhoid fever, he determined to move to a warmer climate and traveled to Florida on horseback. He re-established his practice of the law for a time at Old Columbia on the Suwannee River. He then moved to the town of Alligator, where he encouraged the residents to change the uninviting name to the modern Lake City.

In 1852, Baker was named State Attorney for the Suwannee Circuit, and served as a delegate to the Whig National Convention in Baltimore. There, despite the protests of the Florida delegation, the party nominated General Winfield Scott for President of the United States. Scott was extremely unpopular in the state due to his prosecution of the Seminole Wars, and the decision to put him at the top of the party's ticket alienated many voters. So, it was no surprise in 1856 when Baker failed to win election to the U.S. Congress as a Know Nothing-Whig candidate despite his extensive horseback travels across the state.

In 1859, Baker succeeded in winning election as the state judge for the 4th Judicial District, which met in Suwannee. The same year, he married Fanny Gilchrist. During the tumultuous Election of 1860, Judge Baker supported the failed Constitutional Union ticket of Bell and Everett and opposed Florida's secession after the election of Abraham Lincoln. Once the secession ordinance passed, however, he loyally supported the decision of his adopted state.

Judge Baker was still on the bench in 1861, when the Florida legislature created Baker County in his honor. The following year, the same body selected him to serve as one of the state's two senators in the Confederate Congress. He moved to Richmond, Virginia, for the duration of the U.S. Civil War.

Returning to Florida after the defeat of the South in 1865, Baker was quickly appointed a justice of the Florida Supreme Court by Governor David S. Walker. However, ratification of the state's Reconstruction constitution in 1868 forced his resignation and return to private practice. Over the next several years, he gained his greatest professional reputation for litigation associated with the disposition of lands held by the state's Internal Improvement Fund—which had been created in 1855 to attract Northern capital and spur development.

By 1876, Baker was an active member of the state's Democratic Executive Committee, and worked hard to bring about an end to the Reconstruction era in Florida. In 1881, he was returned as a judge on the state's 4th Judicial Circuit by Governor William Bloxham. He was re-appointed in 1885 by his successor Governor Edward A. Perry. He resigned due to declining health in 1890.

== Last years and death ==
Judge Baker retired in Jacksonville, where he became an elder in the Presbyterian church. He died at his home in that city, aged 70, and was buried at the nearby Evergreen Cemetery. He was survived by his wife and five children.

Confederate States Senate
New constituency	Confederate States Senator (Class 1) from Florida; 1862–1865; Served alongside: Augustus Maxwell	Constituency abolished
