= 46th Mississippi Infantry Regiment =

American Civil War Military unit

- Active: 1862 - 1865
- Disbanded: April 9, 1865
- Country: Confederate States
- Allegiance: Mississippi
- Branch: Army
- Type: Infantry
- Size: Regiment
- Battles: American Civil War: Battle of Chickasaw Bayou; Siege of Vicksburg; Atlanta campaign; Battle of Franklin; Battle of Nashville; Battle of Fort Blakeley

The 46th Mississippi Infantry Regiment, originally designated as the 6th Battalion, Mississippi Infantry was a Confederate infantry regiment from Mississippi which fought in many battles of the Western theater of the American Civil War.

== History ==
Volunteer companies A-E were originally organized as the 6th Battalion, Mississippi Infantry, at Meridian on April 19, 1862. In May the 6th Battalion was sent to Vicksburg, while companies F-I were organized elsewhere in the state that month and then sent to join the others in Vicksburg. Company K had originally been raised in 1861 and attached to the 59th Virginia Infantry, after fighting at the Battle of Roanoke Island this company was captured and later sent back to Mississippi, where it was assigned to join the 6th Battalion.

The 6th Battalion was redesignated as the 46th Mississippi Infantry Regiment on December 2, 1862. In that same month, the 46th Regiment was personally reviewed by Confederate President Jefferson Davis and General Joseph E. Johnston. During the Vicksburg Campaign, the Regiment fought at the Battle of Chickasaw Bayou, receiving praise from Confederate general John C. Pemberton for its contribution to victory in that battle. The Regiment's total strength reported in February 1863 was 407 men.

In 1863, Company E was detached from the rest of the 46th, fighting at the Battle of Jackson and the Chickamauga campaign before rejoining the Regiment in November. The rest of the regiment remained in Vicksburg during the siege of the city, where they surrendered along with the rest of the Confederate garrison on July 4, 1863. The Regiment's colonel, Claudius W. Sears, was promoted to brigadier general for his leadership during the siege, and given command of a brigade that included his former Regiment.

The 46th was exchanged in November 1863 and ordered to Georgia, but they arrived too late to take part in the Chattanooga campaign. The Regiment was then quickly ordered to Mobile, Alabama, then to Meridian, Mississippi, then back to Mobile in quick succession without seeing combat. Finally, the 46th was sent to take part in the Atlanta campaign in May 1864, fighting at Cassville, New Hope Church, Kennesaw Mountain, Atlanta, and Lovejoy's Station. While attacking a defended position guarding a railroad at the Battle of Allatoona, the 46th's Colonel William H. Clark was killed.

During the Franklin–Nashville campaign the Regiment was heavily engaged at the Battle of Franklin, with acting commander Major Turpin D. Magee wounded. The remainder of General Sears' brigade then fought at Murfreesboro and Nashville, where Sears' leg was shot off by a cannonball and he had to be left behind, subsequently to be captured, while his brigade retreated to Mississippi.

Greatly reduced by losses, the Regiment was ordered to Mobile, and the remnants of the 46th were captured at the Battle of Fort Blakeley on April 9, 1865. The prisoners were taken to Ship Island prisoner of war camp, and paroled in May after the war ended.

== Commanders ==
Commanders of the 46th Regiment:

- Col. Claudius W. Sears
- Col. William H. Clark, killed at Allatoona
- Lt. Col. John W. Balfour
- Lt. Col. William K. Easterling

== Organization ==
Companies of the 46th Regiment:

- Company A, "Gaines' Invincibles", of Wayne County.
- Company B, "Covington Rebels", of Covington County.
- Company C, "Yazoo Pickets", of Yazoo County.
- Company D, "Rankin Farmers", of Rankin County.
- Company E, "Jeff Davis Rebels", of Yazoo County and Warren County, served on detached service at the Battle of Jackson and Chickamauga campaign.
- Company F, "Lauderdale Rifles", of Lauderdale County.
- Company G, "Singleton Guard", of Smith County.
- Company H, "Raleigh Rangers", of Smith County.
- Company I, of Newton County.
- Company K, "Kemper Guards", of Kemper County, originally attached to the 59th Virginia Infantry Regiment.

== See also ==
- List of Mississippi Civil War Confederate units
