= 4th Florida Infantry Regiment =

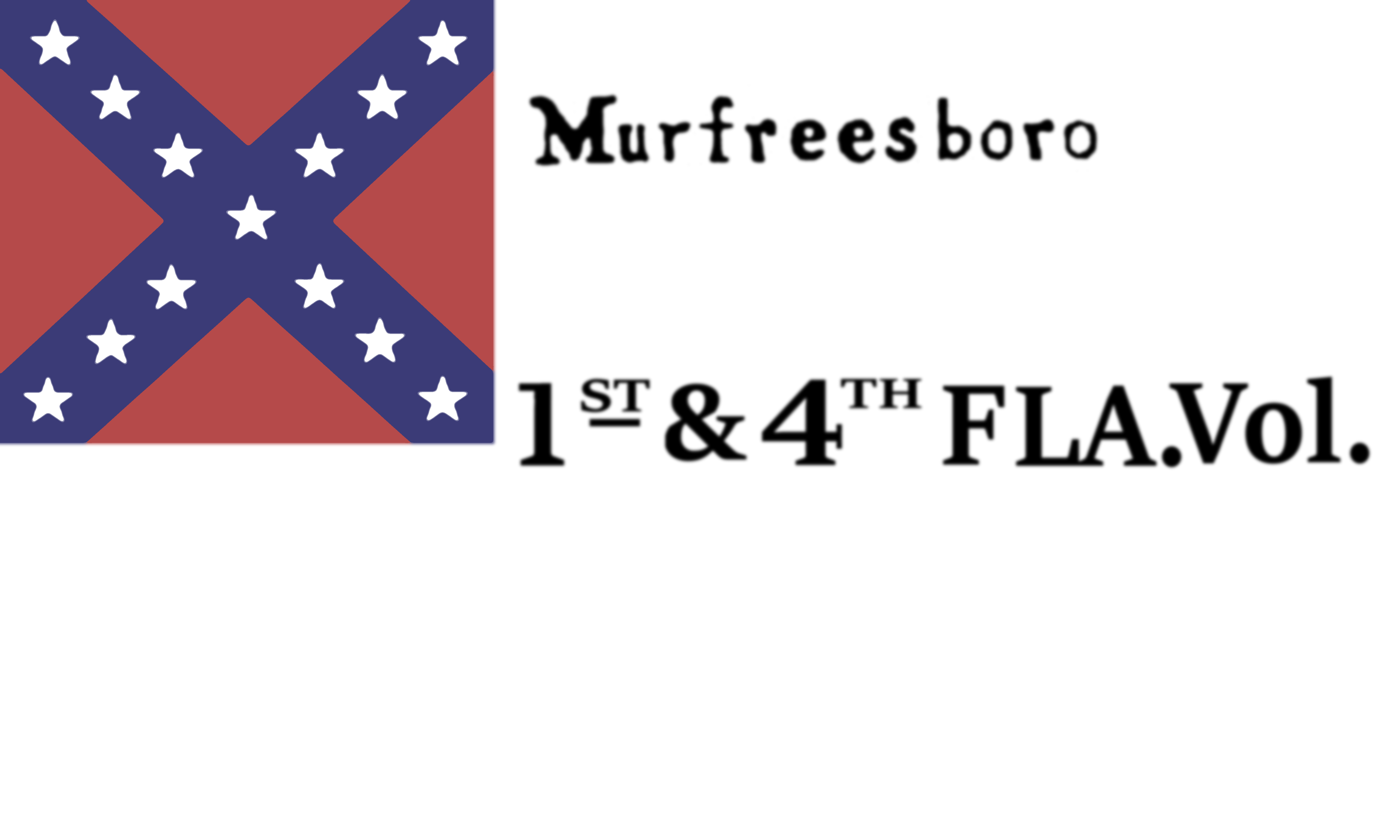
- Battle flag of the consolidated 1st FL (Cav) and 4th FL Inf Regiments from 1863
- Active: Summer 1861 - 1865
- Allegiance: Confederate Florida; Confederate States of America
- Branch: Confederate States Army
- Role: Infantry
- Size: Regiment
- Engagements: American Civil War

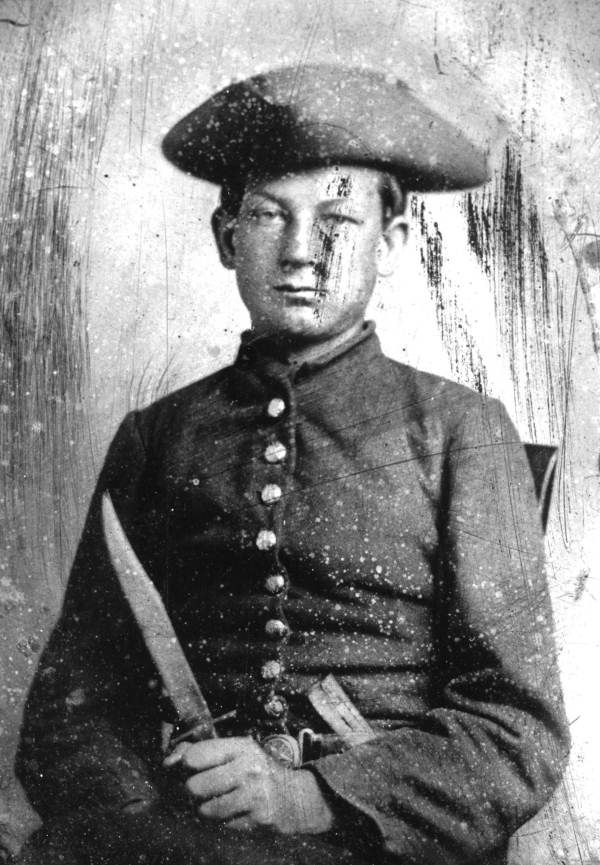
Sergt Washington M. Ives - Co C 4th Fla Inf

The 4th Florida Infantry Regiment was an infantry regiment raised by the Confederate state of Florida during the American Civil War. The unit fought as part of the Florida Brigade of the Army of Tennessee.

== Companies ==
Company	County	Nickname	Commanders
A	Gadsden		Captain Charles A. Gee
B	Franklin	Beauregard Rifles	Adam W. Hunter
C	Madison		Captain William H. Dial
D	Columbia		Captain William A. Shefield
E	Columbia and LaFayette	Lafayette Rangers	Thomas A. McGhee
F	New River (Bradford)		James P. Hunt
G	Marion and Levy		William Fletcher
H	Washington and Liberty		W.F. Lane
I	Jackson	Dixie Boys	Joseph B. Barnes
K	Hillsborough	Sunny South Guards	John T. Lesley

== Service History ==
The regiment was organized in the summer of 1861 at Jacksonville, Florida. The men were raised from the counties of Gadsden, Franklin, Madison, New River, LaFayette, Columbia, Marion, Levy, Liberty, Washington, Jackson, and Hillsborough. The unit was raised with 983 officers and enlisted men.

During May and June 1861, the regiment's companies were scattered along the Gulf Coast to defend key ports, including two companies stationed at Fort Brooke, in Tampa. Officers were elected on July 1st, with Edward Stephans Hopkins elected as the regiment's colonel. It was not until August and September that the companies were officially mustered into the Confederacy, having served under state authority and been paid by the State until then.

During December, 1863, the regiment was consolidated with the 1st Florida Cavalry Regiment.

The unit had a number of battle flags, and at least two that were captured. One had the battle honor of Murfreesboro embroidered on it. The first battle flag lost by the Florida Brigade was that of the consolidated 4th and 1st Florida Cavalry. It was taken by a soldier of the 174th Ohio during the Third Battle of Murfreesboro. The flag was described as: "...has three stripes, a light red field crossed with blue bars, the stars painted on the blue..." Less than two weeks later, another battle flag was captured during the Battle of Nashville by 1st Lt. Charles H. McCleary of the 72nd Ohio Infantry Regiment, for which he was awarded the Medal of Honor.

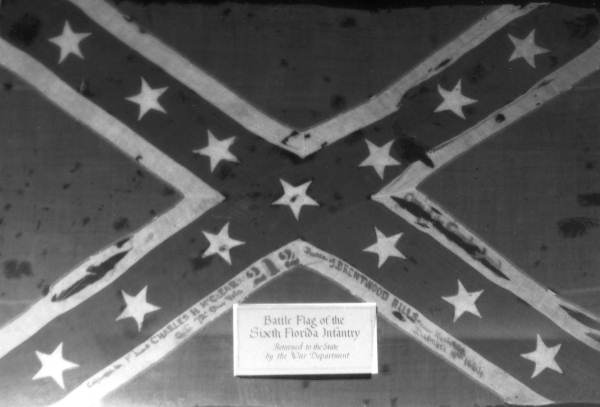
Battle flag of the 4th Florida Infantry Regiment.

The regiment surrendered with only 23 men in April, 1865.

== Engagements ==
- Battle of Stones River
- Siege of Jackson
- Battle of Chickamauga
- Battle of Missionary Ridge

== See also ==
- List of Florida Confederate Civil War units
