= William G. M. Davis =

William George Mackey Davis
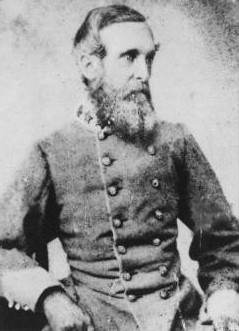
- Born: May 9, 1812; Portsmouth, Virginia
- Died: March 11, 1898 (aged 85); Alexandria, Virginia
- Burial place: Remington, Virginia
- Military career
- Allegiance: Confederate States of America
- Branch: Confederate States Army
- Service years: 1861–1863
- Rank: Brigadier General
- Commands: 1st Florida Cavalry Regiment; Department of East Tennessee
- Conflicts: American Civil War
- Other work: Lawyer, Blockade runner

William George Mackey Davis (May 9, 1812 – March 11, 1898) was a Confederate States Army brigadier general and blockade runner during the American Civil War. He was a lawyer and cotton speculator before the war and a lawyer in Washington, D.C., after the war.

== Early life ==
William George Mackey Davis was born on May 9, 1812, in Portsmouth, Virginia. At age 17, he became a sailor.

Later, he lived in Alabama and then moved to Apalachicola, Florida, where he became a lawyer and a cotton speculator. (Note: Eicher also mentions that Davis was a judge before the war.)

== American Civil War ==
When the American Civil War started, Davis donated $50,000 to the Confederate States and raised the 1st Florida Cavalry Regiment for the Confederate States Army. He was elected colonel and given command of the Confederate provisional forces in eastern Florida.

On March 25, 1862, he was sent to join General Albert Sidney Johnston in Tennessee. There, he commanded the 2d brigade in the 2d division (Heth's) from about July 3, 1862, to October 31, 1862, then the 1st brigade of the 3rd division (Heth's) of the Department of East Tennessee until December 1862.

During the later period, on November 6, 1862, he was promoted to brigadier general. He commanded the 1st brigade of the District, Department of East Tennessee from December 1862 to early 1863. He then served as commander of the Department of East Tennessee until he resigned his commission on May 6, 1863.

Soon after his resignation from the Confederate States army, Davis lived in Richmond, Virginia and Wilmington, North Carolina where he ran a fleet of blockade runners between Wilmington and Nassau.

== Aftermath ==
After a brief period of residence in Jacksonville, Florida, after the war, Davis was pardoned on June 9, 1866. He then moved to Washington, D.C., and resumed the practice of law.

Davis died at Alexandria, Virginia, March 11, 1898. He is buried in Tacket-Burroughs-Davis Cemetery, Remington, Virginia.

== See also ==
- List of American Civil War generals (Confederate)
