= Charles H. McCleary =

Union Army Medal of Honor recipient

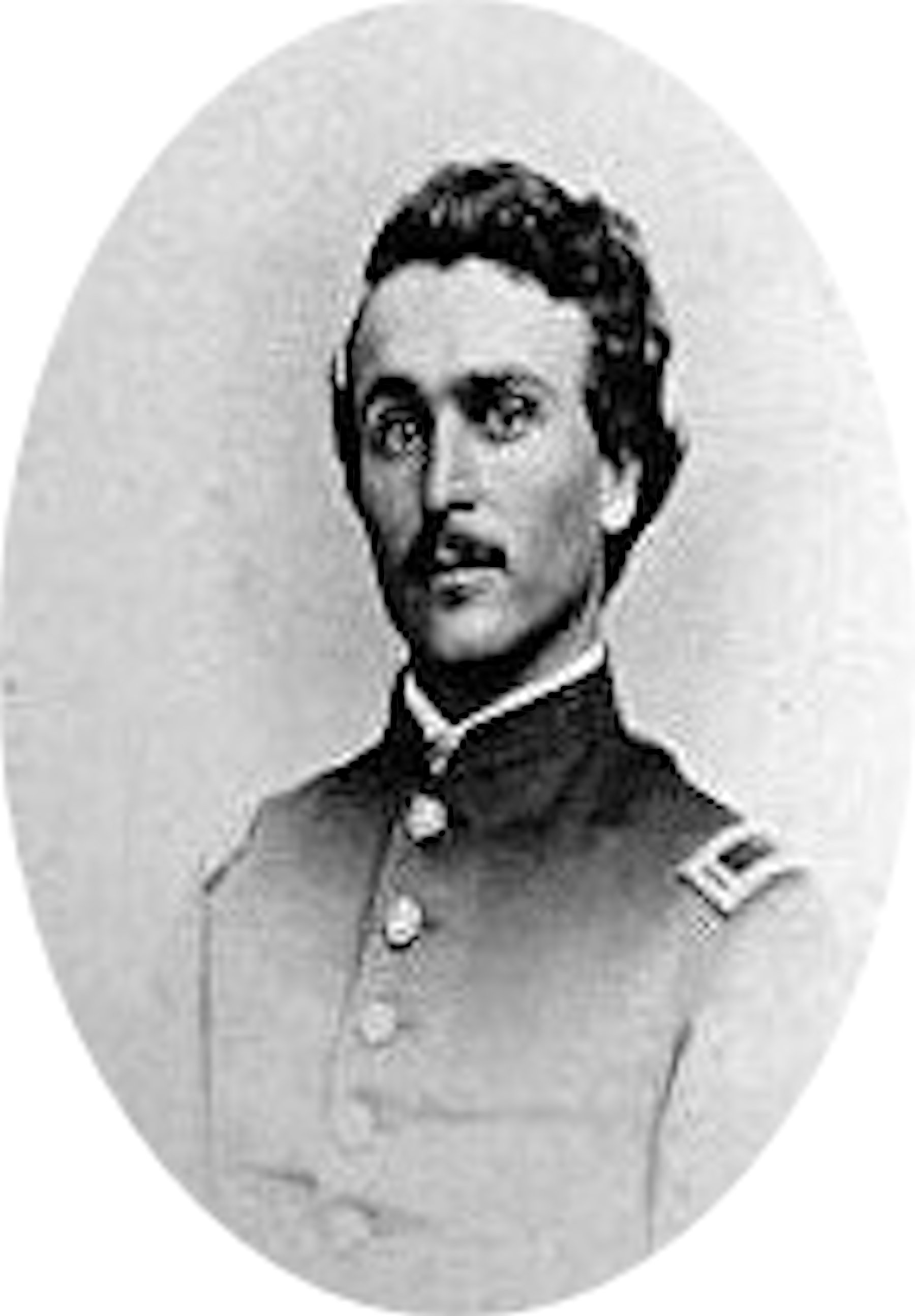
- Born: 1842; Sandusky County, Ohio, U.S.
- Died: June 23, 1906 (aged 63–64)
- Burial place: McPherson Cemetery
- Military career
- Allegiance: United States
- Branch: Union Army
- Service years: 1861–1865
- Rank: Captain
- Unit: 72nd Ohio Infantry Regiment
- Conflicts: Battle of Nashville; Siege of Vicksburg; Battle of Shiloh
- Awards: Medal of Honor (1865)

Charles H. McCleary (1842 – June 23, 1906) was a Union Army soldier who received the Medal of Honor, his country's highest military award for valor, for his actions during the American Civil War.

== Biography ==
Born in Sandusky County, Ohio, in 1842, McCleary enlisted as a private in the Union Army at Clyde, Ohio, in November 1861. He rose to the rank of sergeant-major in February 1863 and second lieutenant in April 1864. He fought at the Battle of Shiloh and Siege of Vicksburg and became first lieutenant of Company C, 72nd Ohio Infantry Regiment, in November 1864.

On December 16, 1864, at the Battle of Nashville, McCleary led his company to attack Compton's Hill, later known as Shy's Hill, a key entrenched Confederate position outside Nashville, Tennessee. Union attackers, including McCleary's troops, fixed bayonets, scaled the hillside, and advanced on Confederate positions in silence to achieve surprise. McCleary dashed out ahead of his troops, braving Confederate artillery fire, and personally captured the flag of the 4th Florida Infantry Regiment. The Confederates broke and fled, and the Union won a decisive victory.

General George Henry Thomas sent McCleary to Washington, D.C., where he and other officers presented captured Confederate flags to Secretary of War Edwin Stanton. McCleary next met with President Abraham Lincoln, who granted him the "freedom of the city" and a thirty-day furlough, in the course of which the studio of Mathew Brady took McCleary's photograph. On February 24, 1865, the United States Congress awarded McCleary the Medal of Honor. Promoted to captain in May 1865, he mustered out with his regiment on September 11, 1865, and returned to civilian life.

McCleary married Clarissa Brown and had at least one child, a daughter named Hallie McCleary. Sometime after the Civil War, he served as postmaster of his hometown of Clyde, Ohio.

He died on June 23, 1906, and was buried at McPherson Cemetery in Clyde.
