= 128th Ohio Infantry Regiment =

- Active: January 1862 to July 17, 1865
- Country: United States
- Allegiance: Union
- Branch: Infantry

The 128th Ohio Infantry Regiment, sometimes 128th Ohio Volunteer Infantry (or 128th OVI) was an infantry regiment in the Union Army during the American Civil War.

== Service ==
The 128th Ohio Infantry was organized in Columbus and Johnson's Island, Ohio and mustered in for three years service under the command of Colonel Charles W. Hill. Companies A through E were organized January through September 1862; Companies E through K were organized December 1863 through January 1864.

The regiment moved from Columbus to Sandusky, Ohio, January 1864. It performed guard duty at Sandusky and at Johnson's Island, Sandusky Bay, until July 1865. Portions of the regiment served on detached duty in West Virginia. The regiment moved to Camp Chase July 10, and mustered out of service on July 17, 1865.

== Casualties ==
The regiment lost a total of 64 men during service; 1 officer and 63 enlisted men died of disease.

== Commanders ==
- Colonel Charles W. Hill
- Lieutenant Colonel Thomas H. Linnell

== See also ==
- List of Ohio Civil War units
- Ohio in the Civil War
