= Albert Henry Washburn =

American diplomat (1866–1930)

24th United States Ambassador to Austria-Hungary
- In office June 19, 1922 – April 29, 1930
- Preceded by: Frederic Courtland Penfield
- Succeeded by: Gilchrist Baker Stockton

Personal details
- Born: 1866 Middleborough, Massachusetts
- Died: April 29, 1930 (aged 63–64) Vienna, Austria
- Parent(s): Edward; Ann (nee White)
- Education: Cornell University; University of Virginia; Georgetown University (LLB); Dartmouth College (AM)

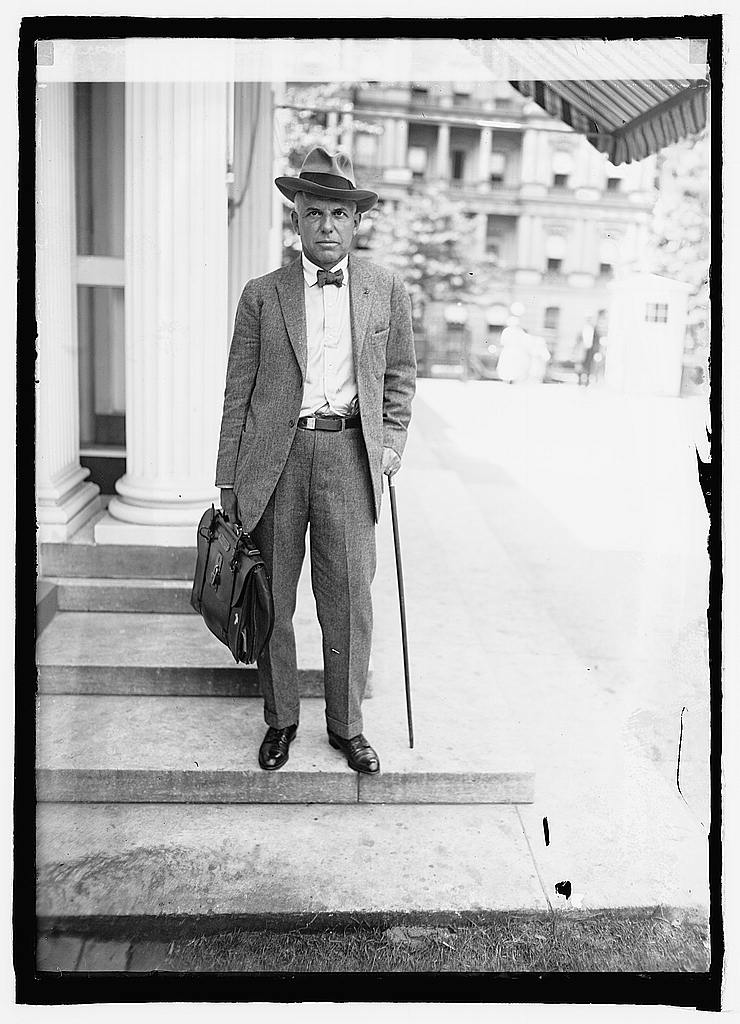
Washburn, Albert Henry, Minister to Vienna, 7/21/24

Albert Henry Washburn (1866–April 29, 1930) was a non-career appointee who served as the American Envoy Extraordinary and Minister Plenipotentiary to Austria from 1922 until his death on April 29, 1930.

== Biography ==
Washburn was born in Middleborough, Massachusetts to Edward and Ann (White) Washburn. He graduated from Cornell University in 1889 and joined the Consular Service in 1890. He earned a LL.B. from Georgetown University after transferring from the University of Virginia in 1895. In 1897, he was appointed Assistant U.S. District Attorney in Massachusetts but transferred to the U.S. Treasury Department in 1900. He left in 1905 to go into private practice. In 1919, he received his A.M. from Dartmouth College and the following year, joined their faculty as a professor of political science and international law. In 1922, he arbitrated the Austrian-Yugoslavian Commercial Dispute.
