= 13th Independent Battery New York Light Artillery =

- Active: 15 October 1861 – 28 July 1865
- Country: United States
- Allegiance: (United States) Union; New York
- Branch: Union Army
- Type: Field Artillery
- Size: Artillery Battery
- Equipment: 3-inch Ordnance rifles (1864)
- Engagements: American Civil War; Battle of Cross Keys (1862); 2nd Battle of Bull Run (1862); Battle of Chancellorsville (1863); Battle of Gettysburg (1863); Battle of Missionary Ridge (1863); Atlanta campaign (1864); Third Battle of Murfreesboro (1864)

Commanders
- Notable commanders: Charles E. Winegar

13th Independent Battery New York Light Artillery was an artillery battery from New York state that served in the Union Army during the American Civil War. The battery was organized in October 1861. It fought at Cross Keys and Second Bull Run in 1862. The 13th Battery fought at Chancellorsville, Gettysburg, and Chattanooga in 1863. It participated in the Atlanta campaign and fought at Murfreesboro in 1864. The battery was on garrison duty in 1865 and was mustered out in July 1865.

== Organization ==
Organized at New York City and mustered in October 15, 1861. Left State for Washington, D.C., October 17. Attached to Baker's Brigade, Stone's Division, Army of the Potomac, to December, 1861. Blenker's Division, Army of the Potomac, to March, 1862. Blenker's 2nd Division 2nd Army Corps, Army of the Potomac, to April, 1862. Blenker's Division, Dept. of the Mountains, to June, 1862. Reserve Artillery, 1st Corps, Pope's Army of Virginia, to September, 1862. Artillery, 1st Division, 11th Army Corps, Army of the Potomac, to May, 1863. Artillery Brigade, 11th Army Corps, to October, 1863. Artillery Brigade, 11th Army Corps, Dept. of the Cumberland, to January, 1864. Artillery, 3rd Division, 11th Army Corps, to April, 1864. Artillery, 2nd Division, 20th Army Corps, Army of the Cumberland, to September. 1864. Unattached Artillery, Post of Murfreesboro, Tenn., Dept. of the Cumberland, to December, 1864. Defenses Nashville & Chattanooga Railroad, Dept. of the Cumberland, to March, 1865. 2nd Brigade, 1st Sub-District, Middle Tennessee, Dept. of the Cumberland, to July, 1865.

== Service ==
Duty on the Upper Potomac to December, 1861, and in the Defenses of Washington, D.C., until April, 1862. Operations in the Shenandoah Valley until July. Reconnaissance to Rappahannock River and action at Rappahannock Crossing April 18. Battle of Cross Keys June 8. Occupation of Luray July 22. Pope's Campaign in Northern Virginia August 16-September 2. Fords of the Rappahannock August 21–23. Battles of Groveton August 29; Bull Run August 30. Duty in the Defenses of Washington, D, C., until December. March to Fredericksburg, Va., December 10–16. "Mud March" January 20–24, 1863. At Brook's Station until April. Chancellorsville Campaign April 27-May 6. Battle of Chancellorsville May 1–5. Battle of Gettysburg, Pa., July 1–3. Pursuit of Lee July 5–24. Near Bristoe Station until September. Movement to Bridgeport, Ala., September 24-October 4. Reopening Tennessee River October 26–29. Chattanooga-Ringgold Campaign November 23–27. Orchard Knob November 23–24. Mission Ridge November 24–25. March to relief of Knoxville November 28-December 8. Duty in Lookout Valley until April, 1864. Atlanta (Ga.) Campaign May 1-September 8. Demonstration on Rocky Faced Ridge, Tunnel Hill and Buzzard's Roost Gap May 8–11. Dug Gap or Mill Creek May 8. Battle of Resaca May 14–15. Near Cassville May 19. New Hope Church May 25. Operations on line of Pumpkin Vine Creek and battles about Dallas, New Hope Church and Allatoona Hills May 26-June 5. Operations about Marietta and against Kenesaw Mountain June 10-July 2. Pine Hill June 11–14. Lost Mountain June 15–17. Gilgal or Golgotha Church June 15. Muddy Creek June 17. Noyes Creek June 19. Kolb's Farm June 22. Assault on Kenesaw June 27. Ruff's Station, Smyrna Camp Ground, July 4. Chattahoochie River July 5–17. Peach Tree Creek July 19–20. Siege of Atlanta July 22-August 25. Operations at Chattahoochie River Bridge August 26-September 2. Occupation of Atlanta September 2. Ordered to Murfreesboro, Tenn., and duty in that District until July, 1865. Overall's Creek December 4, 1864. Hood's attack on Murfreesboro December 5–12, 1864. Wilkinson's Pike, Murfreesboro, December 7. Mustered out July 28, 1865.

Battery lost during service 1 Officer and 11 Enlisted men killed and mortally wounded and 16 Enlisted men by disease. Total 28.

== Atlanta campaign ==
At the Battle of Kolb's Farm on 22 June 1864, the 13th New York Battery I was posted on a hill on the right of John W. Geary's division. While assisting in the defense of Alpheus S. Williams' division, the guns fired canister and spherical case shot to repulse a Confederate infantry attack.
