= Florida Brigade of the Army of Tennessee =

Confederate brigade in American Civil War

The Florida Brigade was a Confederate States Army unit during the American Civil War. It fought as part of the Army of Tennessee in the Western theater of the war. The brigade was formed in November 1863. It comprised the following units: the 1st, 3rd, 4th, 6th, and 7th Florida Infantry Regiments, as well as the 1st Florida Cavalry Regiment, which fought dismounted. Portions of the brigade fought in nearly every major campaign of the Western Theater. (Note: The only two campaigns that units in the brigade did not participate in were Iuka and Corinth.)

== Service History ==
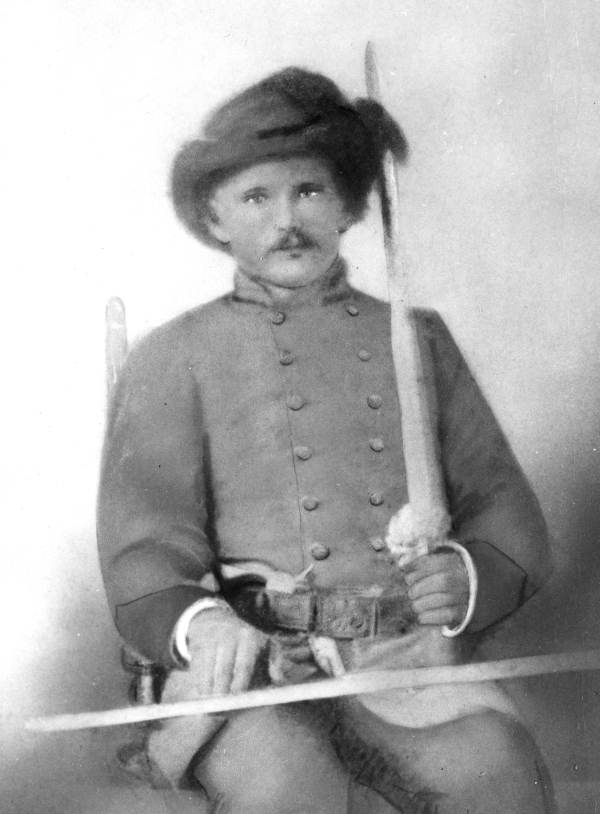
Lieut. Henry W. Reddick. Born June 16, 1835, in Bibb Co. Georgia. Served in the 1st Florida Infantry.

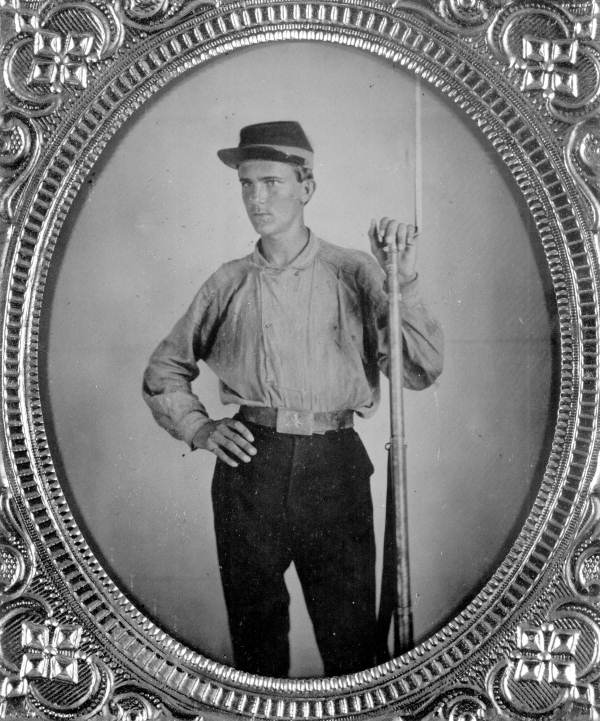
William Denham, a West Florida Seminary Cadet and private in the 1st Florida Infantry. He was captured during his first skirmish, but was released and recovered from his wounds.

The Brigade was not officially organized until November 1863, but was made up of units that were veterans of previous campaigns, including the 1st and 3rd, who had fought together since December 1862.

On November 12, 1863, General Braxton Bragg issued his Special Orders No. 294, in an attempt to reorganize his army. It was this order that created the Florida Brigade of the Army of Tennessee. The brigade was to be led by "the Senior Colonel," who was William Scott Dilworth of the 3rd Florida. However, Dilworth had fallen ill following the Battle of Chickamauga and was on a forty-day furlough. Instead, the leadership of the Florida Brigade fell to Colonel Jesse J. Finley. At the time of consolidation, the 1st and 3rd regiments totaled 240 men and 119 arms.

According to letters and diaries, the Floridians were happy about the consolidation of the brigade. Their first combat together would be at Missionary Ridge. Despite the Confederates suffering a defeat in the battle, the Floridians themselves were praised by their superiors for their hard fighting. However, they also suffered hundreds of "irreplaceable" casualties. The 1st Florida Cavalry and 4th Florida Infantry, in particular, were nearly annihilated.

Following Missionary Ridge, the brigade rested, refitted, and built cabins to endure the winter of 1863 in Dalton, Georgia. At the start of their next campaign, the Atlanta Campaign, the brigade was bolstered to over 1,200 men. It was during the battle at Resaca in May 1864 that General Finley was struck twice by artillery fire and ordered to the rear to convalesce, despite being "extremely loath to leave his gallant brigade in such a crisis." Colonel Robert Bullock took command of the unit until Finley's return in August.

The Brigade's otherwise positive reputation was marred by two defeats in December 1864, first at Murfreesboro when they were routed and then again they "all but fell apart" after the Union assault on Shy's Hill during the Battle of Nashville.

In March 1865, the Brigade saw its final battle at Bentonville.

On April 9, 1865, the same day that General Lee surrendered at Appomattox, General Johnston reorganized his army and consolidated all Florida units into a single reorganized Florida 1st Infantry Regiment. When it came time for this unit to surrender, only around 400 men from what was once the Florida Brigade took the Oath of Allegiance on May 1, 1865.

== Engagements, Battles, and Campaigns ==
- Battle of Missionary Ridge, November 25, 1863.
- Battle of Resaca, May 13–15, 1864.
- Battle of Marietta, June 9-July 3, 1864.
- Franklin–Nashville campaign, September 18-December 27, 1864.
- Third Battle of Murfreesboro, December 5–7, 1864.
- Battle of Bentonville, March 19–21, 1865.

== See also ==
- List of Florida Confederate Civil War units
