= Claudius W. Sears =

Confederate Army general

Claudius Wistar Sears
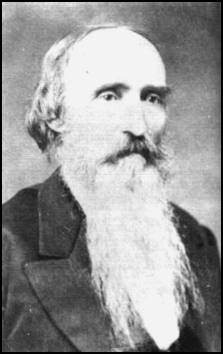
- Claudius Wistar Sears
- Born: November 8, 1817; Peru, Massachusetts, US
- Died: February 15, 1891 (aged 73); Oxford, Mississippi, US
- Burial place: Saint Peter's Cemetery in Oxford
- Military career
- Allegiance: United States; Confederate States
- Branch: United States Army; Confederate States Army
- Service years: 1841–1842 (USA); 1861–1865 (CSA)
- Rank: Second Lieutenant (USA); Brigadier General (CSA)
- Units: 8th U.S. Infantry; 46th Mississippi Infantry Regiment
- Conflicts: Second Seminole War; American Civil War: Peninsula Campaign; Maryland Campaign; Vicksburg Campaign; Atlanta campaign; Franklin-Nashville Campaign

Claudius Wistar Sears (November 8, 1817 – February 15, 1891) was a United States Army officer, an educator, and a Confederate general during the American Civil War.

During the war, Sears was part of the Confederate garrison that was captured following the Siege of Vicksburg in 1863, and would be wounded twice in combat. After the conflict he returned to teaching.

== Early life and career ==
Claudius Sears was born in the city of Peru located in Berkshire County, Massachusetts. He attended the United States Military Academy in West Point in July 1837, and graduated four years later, standing 31st out of 52 cadets. Despite his Massachusetts birth, Sears received his appointment to West Point from the state of New York. He was commissioned a second lieutenant in the 8th U.S. Infantry on July 1, 1841. Sears and the 8th Infantry fought in Florida during the Seminole Wars until the fall of 1842.

Sears resigned his commission from the U.S. Army on October 10, 1842. Following a short stint teaching at St. Thomas's Hall at Holly Springs in Marshall County, Mississippi, he moved to Louisiana and was the professor of mathematics at the University of Louisiana (known now as Tulane) in New Orleans from 1845 to 1859. Sears then was a professor at Louisiana University from 1859 into 1860, teaching both math as well as physics. He returned to St. Thomas's Hall in 1860 to serve as its president until 1861.

== Civil War service ==
At the start of the American Civil War in 1861, Sears chose to follow the Confederate cause and enlisted in the 17th Mississippi Infantry Regiment that May, and elected captain of its Company G soon afterward. Sears and the 17th Infantry fought at the First Battle of Bull Run on July 21 and at the Battle of Ball's Bluff on October 21, and participated during the 1862 Peninsula Campaign engagements of Yorktown, Seven Pines, and the Seven Days Battles. Sears fought at the Battle of Antietam during the Maryland Campaign on September 17.

On December 11, 1862, Sears was appointed colonel of the 46th Mississippi Infantry Regiment, and began his Western Theater service. With his new regiment, Sears participated during the Vicksburg Campaign of late 1862 and summer of 1863. He fought at Battle of Chickasaw Bayou on December 29, 1862, and the Battle of Port Gibson on May 1, 1863, but during the fighting at the Battle of Champion Hill his regiment was held in reserve.

Defenses of Vicksburg, Miss. in 1863

In the spring and summer of 1863, Sears and his command were part of the Army of Mississippi, led by Lt. Gen. John C. Pemberton and defending the Confederate stronghold at Vicksburg guarding the Mississippi River. Following the six-week-long siege of the garrison and its surrender on July 4, Sears was captured by Union forces, and was exchanged that fall. Sears' brigade commander, William E. Baldwin, praised his performance at Vicksburg, saying:

Colonel Sears, Forty-sixth Mississippi, merits favorable notice for his conduct during this trying time.

After being exchanged in October 1863, Sears was returned to his command in early 1864 following several months on parole. On March 1 he was promoted to brigadier general and ordered to join the Army of Tennessee. On April 1 his brigade was added to Maj. Gen. Samuel G. French's Division, and Sears arrived with his command that May at Resaca, Georgia. He fought during the Atlanta campaign in the summer of 1864, and was wounded during the Battle of Adairsville near Cassville, Georgia, on May 19.

Sears next participated in the late 1864 Franklin-Nashville Campaign, taking part in the Battle of Allatoona on October 5, the Battle of Franklin on November 30, and the Battle of Nashville on December 15, where Sears was severely wounded. During the fight, a cannonball killed his horse and one of Sears' legs was shot off. He was removed for care to the rear areas of the Army of Tennessee as it retreated, but was left behind and captured on December 27 at Pulaski, Tennessee. Sears was paroled from Nashville, Tennessee on June 23, 1865.

== Postbellum ==
After the war, Sears returned to Mississippi and taught mathematics & civil engineering at the University of Mississippi from 1865 to 1889. He died two years later at Oxford in Lafayette County, Mississippi, and is buried there in the city's Saint Peter's Cemetery.

== See also ==
- List of American Civil War generals (Confederate)
