= Drunken Peasants =

American social, popular culture, and political commentary podcast

The Drunken Peasants
- Genre: Comedy; popular culture; social commentary; political commentary
- Format: Audio, video
- Language: English

Creative team
- Created by: Ben, TJ Kirk

Cast and voices
- Hosted by: Ben (aka. Benpai)

Production
- Length: 2–4 hours

Publication
- No. of episodes: 1581 (as of January 2026)
- Original release: January 5, 2014

Related

YouTube information
- Channel: Drunken Peasants
- Years active: 2014–present
- Subscribers: 105 thousand
- Views: 74.2 million
- Last updated: January 26, 2026

Drunken Peasants (DP) is an American social, popular culture, and political commentary podcast that started in January 2014. The podcast was originally hosted by the mononymous Ben (a.k.a. Benpai), TJ Kirk, and Scotty Kirk. Paul Parkey Jr. (aka. PaulsEgo) became the fourth host in 2016. From February 2018 to January 2024, the podcast was hosted by Ben and William Berry (a.k.a. Billy the Fridge), but is now just Ben. The podcast predominantly features the hosts commenting on video clips from the Internet, with YouTube videos from other YouTubers often being featured.

In a 2016 episode of the podcast, right-wing political commentator Milo Yiannopoulos appeared to defend sexual relationships between men and 13-year-old boys, criticized the age of consent and made light of molestation by Catholic priests, according to The Daily Beast. Following publication of a video clip of the episode online, Yiannopoulos was dis-invited from speaking at the 2017 Conservative Political Action Conference (CPAC), whose organizers accused Yiannopoulos of condoning pedophilia.

== History ==
Drunken Peasants originally aired in 2014 as the No Bullshit Podcast. The show was co-created by Ben and TJ Kirk (known on YouTube as "The Amazing Atheist"). For the first +20 episodes the show did not have video but instead included only the voices of the hosts as they did the show. The podcast also used guest hosts, with TJ Kirk's production support staffer and younger brother Scotty Kirk eventually becoming a full-time host. YouTuber Paul Parkey (known as PaulsEgo) became the fourth member of the podcast's permanent staff in 2016. In 2017 Billy the Fridge became the fifth regular host. As of January 2023, the podcast had produced 1132 episodes.

TJ Kirk announced the end of the Drunken Peasants on December 29, 2017 via his own YouTube channel and Twitter. On January 31, 2018, TJ Kirk announced that the show would continue with hosts Ben and Billy The Fridge.

=== Milo Yiannopoulos episode ===
In January 2016, far-right political commentator Milo Yiannopoulos was a guest of the show. During the 3-hour long episode, Yiannopoulos discussed his sexual abuse as a teenager and said that sexual relationships between 13-year-old boys and adult men and women can "happen perfectly consensually". According to The Daily Beast, Yiannopoulos also criticized the age of consent and made light of molestation by Catholic priests. In February 2017, the conservative blog The Reagan Battalion posted a segment of the Drunken Peasants episode on Twitter. Following widespread criticism of Yiannopoulos's comments, he dis-invited to speak at the Conservative Political Action Conference (CPAC), whose organizers accused Yiannopoulos of condoning pedophilia. In an interview with TJ Kirk on The Joe Rogan Experience, host Joe Rogan remarked to TJ Kirk that "Your podcast was the big podcast that kind of sunk Milo", to which Kirk commented that he had known what he had gotten himself into by inviting Yiannopoulos on the podcast, while also stating that the podcasts's impact on Yiannopoulos had been unintentional.

== Format ==
Generally, Drunken Peasants episodes are anywhere from two to three hours in length. In December 2017, the podcast announced that future episodes would air on Mondays and Thursdays. In June 2018, the podcast instead announced that going forward their shows would be on Tuesdays and Saturdays.
