= TJ Kirk =

American YouTuber and podcast host

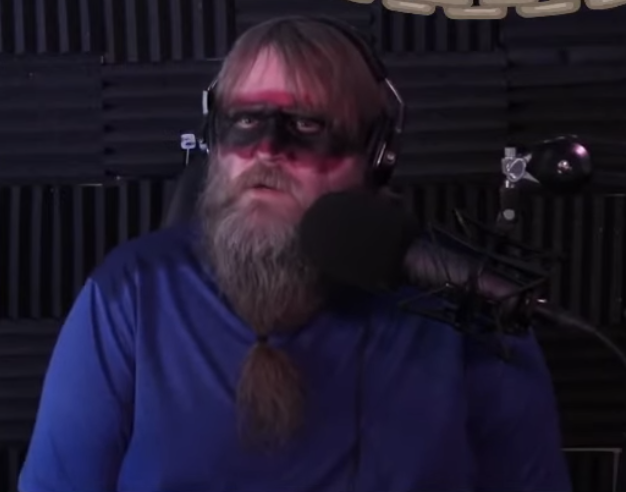
- Kirk in 2021
- Born: Thomas James Kirk III; February 20, 1985 (age 41)
- Other name: Terroja Lee Kincaid
- Occupations: YouTuber; podcaster

YouTube information
- Channel: INTO THE FRAY
- Years active: 2006–present
- Genres: Social criticism; Political commentary; Criticism of religion; Black comedy
- Subscribers: 923 thousand
- Views: 448 million
- Last updated: October 8, 2026

Thomas James Kirk III (born February 20, 1985), previously known by the pseudonym Terroja Lee Kincaid, is an American YouTuber and podcaster. Kirk's YouTube channel, previously known as The Amazing Atheist, gained popularity in the 2010s for its criticism of religion. He has since expanded his focus to other political and social issues.

Kirk previously had over one million subscribers on his main channel, and has over 445 million views in total. From 2014 until 2017, he was one of the hosts of Drunken Peasants, a YouTube news podcast focused on interviews and current events and interviews.

== Early life ==
Thomas James Kirk III was born on February 20, 1985. His father was Thomas James Kirk Jr. (July 1, 1946 – January 3, 2008), who operated several fraudulent higher education organizations and served three years in U.S. federal prison following a plea deal. At the age of sixteen, Kirk dropped out of high school with aspirations of being an author.

== Career ==
Kirk began posting videos on YouTube in November 2006. In 2007, he posted a video which included a warning about the mental instability of 18-year-old Pekka-Eric Auvinen, who would later perpetrate the Jokela school shooting.

In October 2011, a video of Kirk engaging in a sex act with a banana was leaked on the internet imageboard 4chan. Members from the 4chan community subsequently raided his channel, posting images from the video to his channel's comment section and Facebook page. In response, Kirk released a video to his channel called "Bananagate 2011" in which he said "the things that I did, I did because I enjoy them. I wasn't ashamed of them when I was doing them in private, I see no reason to be ashamed of them now that they've been made public."

In 2012, Kirk was widely criticized for incendiary comments made on Reddit before he deleted his account. In an argument about trigger warnings, Kirk repeatedly stated that one of the participants, a self-described rape victim, should be raped again. Science blogger PZ Myers condemned these posts and went on to debate many of Kirk's past claims about feminism, writing that "this kind of thing has always been part of his YouTube schtick." After the incident, Kirk apologized to the Reddit user in a private message and later made a public apology. Kirk addressed the issue further in a 2014 YouTube video entitled "Rape, Feminism, and The Amazing Atheist", in which he again apologized for the incident and explained the context in which it happened: his remarks were meant to be satirical commentary on trigger warnings.

In 2013, Kirk was a guest on a CNN panel, where he discussed the rise of atheism in America with Christian theologian William Lane Craig.

Kirk has made two appearances on The Joe Rogan Experience, one in January 2016 and another in March 2017. Kirk interviewed Milo Yiannopoulos for a Drunken Peasants podcast in 2016. In 2017 Breitbart, CPAC and Simon & Schuster severed their ties with Yiannopoulos based on comments from the episode where Yiannopoulos spoke positively of sexual relationships between boys and adult men.

In 2018, Kirk was criticized for a controversial tweet in which he claimed that Alicia Vikander's breasts were too small for her to play the video game character Lara Croft in the 2018 film Tomb Raider, and for later posting a video to his YouTube channel on the subject called "Lara Croft's b00bz – The Issue Of The Century".

=== Writing career and published works ===
Although best known for online social, political, and religious commentary, Kirk has also published written works that collect his essays, satire, personal reflections, and polemical commentary. His best-known book is The Douchebag Bible, published in 2013, which is described as an anthology of three earlier works: Scumbag: Musings of a Subhuman, In Defense of Evil: Why Good Is Bad and Bad Is Good, and Neckbeard Uprising. His writing generally reflects the same provocative, comedic, and argumentative style that made his online persona recognizable, focusing on themes such as atheism, morality, politics, internet culture, and social criticism. Kirk’s authorial career remains secondary to his larger reputation as a digital commentator, but his books represent an extension of his early online voice into essay and anthology form.

=== Artistic pursuits ===
Kirk is also an avid painter who sells his works via his official Etsy store. He lists himself as a painter on his official Instagram page.

== Personal life ==
Kirk is bisexual.
