= 1st Florida Cavalry Regiment (Confederate) =

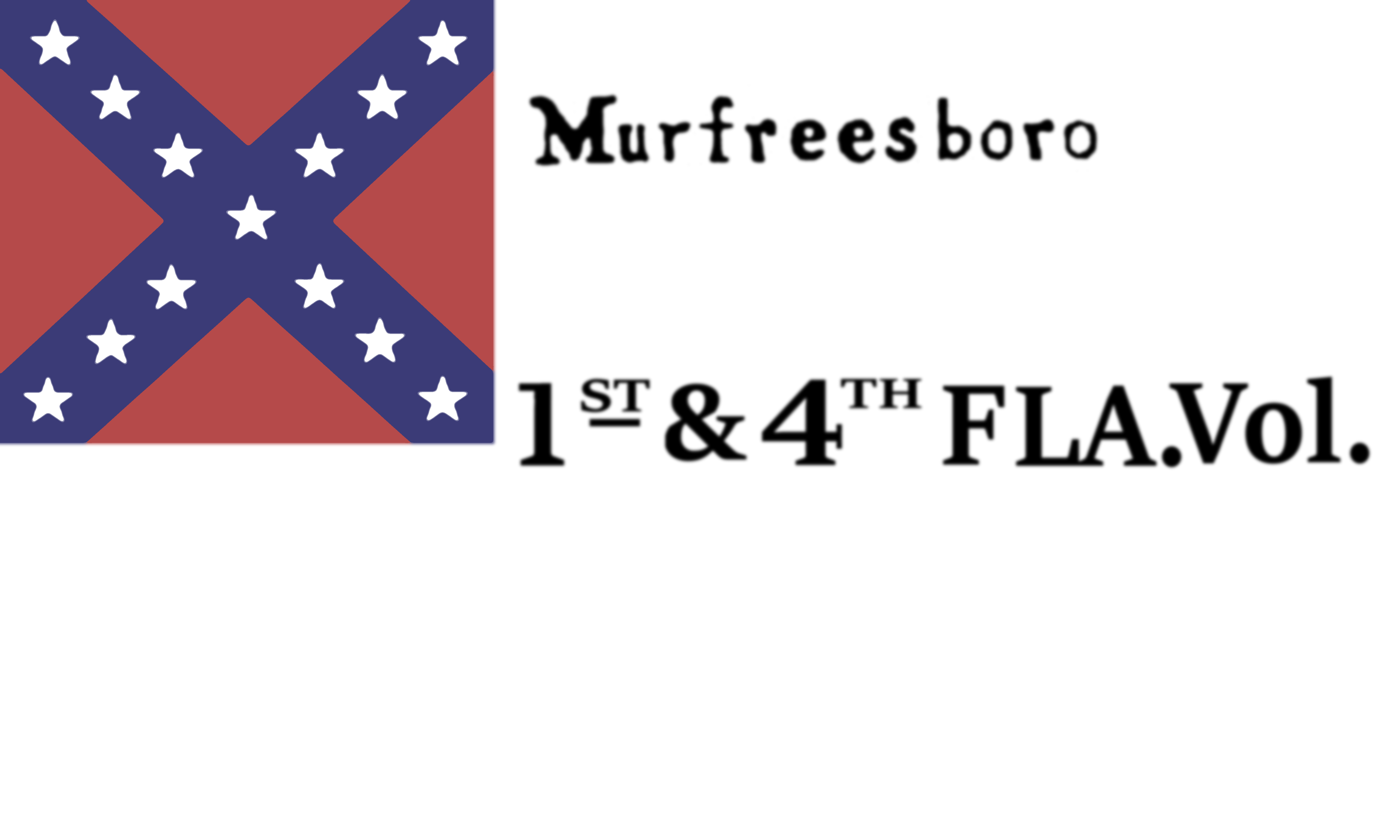
- Battle flag of the combined 1st Florida Cavalry and 4th Florida Infantry regiments (1863).
- Active: April 5, 1861 - February 1862
- Country: Confederate States of America
- Allegiance: Florida
- Branch: Confederate States Army
- Type: Army Corps
- Role: infantry tactics trench warfare
- Part of: Army of Tennessee
- Engagements: American Civil War: Siege of Knoxville (September—December 1863); Kentucky Campaign; Battle of Chickamauga; Battle of Chattanooga; Atlanta campaign; Franklin-Nashville Campaign (Tennessee Campaign); Second Battle of Franklin (Tennessee Campaign); Battle of Nashville of John Bell Hood (Tennessee Campaign); Carolinas campaign

Commanders
- Notable commanders: Col. William G. M. Davis; Lt. Col. George Troup Maxwell; Lt. Col. William Tennent Stockton

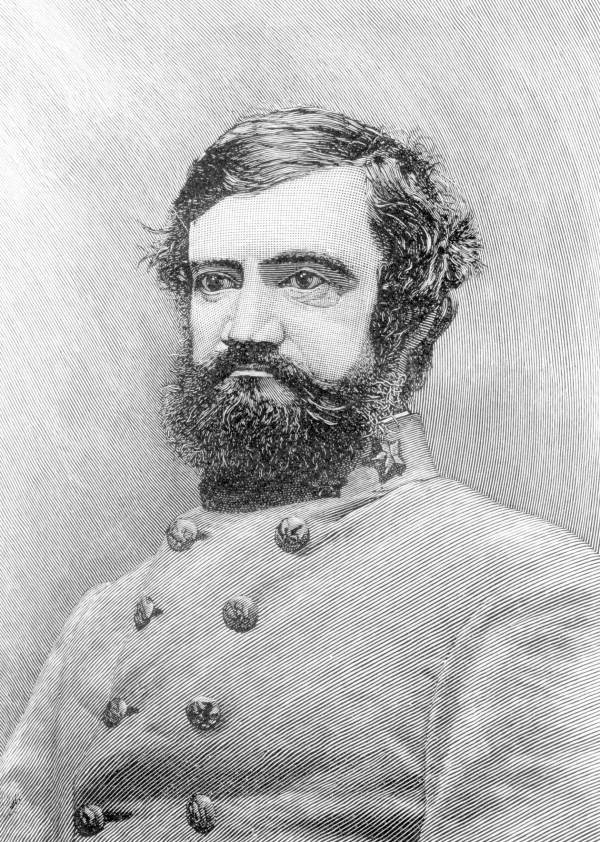
Lt. Col. William T. Stockton of the 1st Florida Cavalry

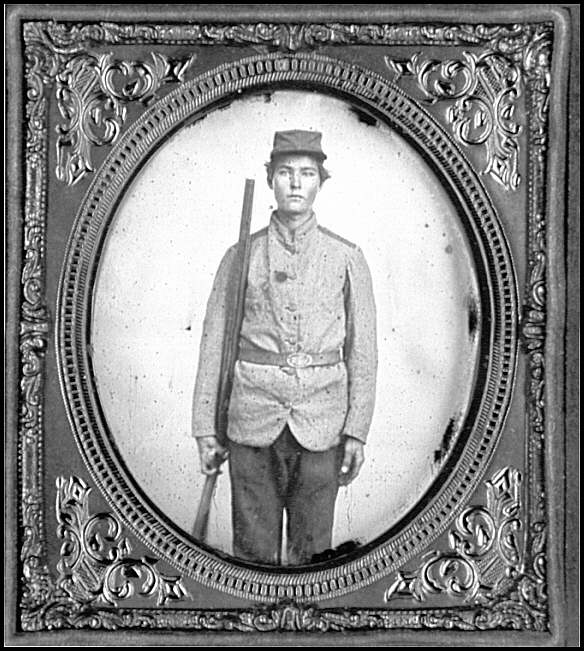
Private Walter Miles Parker of the 1st Florida Cavalry

The 1st Florida Cavalry Regiment was a Confederate army unit during the U.S. Civil War, originally organized in July 1861 at Tallahassee. Members of the regiment came primarily from Alachua, Clay, Columbia, Duval, Leon, Levy, Nassau and Suwannee counties. It left for the western theater in 1862.

== Organization ==
The 1st Florida Cavalry was organized in July 1861 just south of Tallahassee. William G. M. Davis, a relatively wealthy lawyer from Leon County, used his own funds to start the regiment and was elected colonel of the unit. Companies that made up the unit were raised from the following counties: Alachua, Clay, Columbia, Duval, Leon, Levy, Nassau, and Suwannee.

After mustering in, the unit served in Florida until the spring of 1862, at which time Companies A, E, and F continued to serve as cavalry while the other seven companies were dismounted.

The unit was engaged at the Battle of Missionary Ridge in 1863. During combat, the unit lost its entire officer cadre to casualties. As a result, the 1st Florida Cavalry Regiment was combined with the 4th Florida Infantry Regiment during the 1863-1864 winter camp in Dalton. The new combined unit remained together until the surrender of the Army of Tennessee in 1865.

== Assignments ==
- Department of West Florida, April - October 1861
- Department of Alabama and West Florida, October 1861
- Army of Pensacola, Department of Alabama and West Florida, October 1861 - February 1862
- Army of Tennessee, February 1862 - April 1865

Officers of the 1st Florida Cavalry Regiment
Rank	Name
----
Colonel	William G. M. Davis
Lt. Colonel	George Troup Maxwell
Lt. Colonel	William T. Stockton

== Battles ==
- Scouting activities around Union occupied Fernandina Beach in 1861
- Siege of Knoxville, September—December 1863
- Kentucky Campaign
- Battle of Chickamauga
- Battle of Chattanooga
- Atlanta campaign
- Tennessee Campaigns (Franklin-Nashville Campaign, Second Battle of Franklin, and Battle of Nashville) of John Bell Hood
- Carolinas campaign

The 1st Florida Cavalry Regiment surrendered in North Carolina in April 1865.

== See also ==
- Florida Civil War Confederate Units
