= Mobile campaign order of battle: Union =

Siege operations by the Union Army at the Battle of Spanish Fort under Maj. General Canby

The following units and commanders of the Union Army fought at the Mobile campaign of the American Civil War involving the battles of Spanish Fort and Fort Blakeley. The units engaged against Spanish Fort involved Veatch's Division, Benton's Division and Henry Bertram's Brigade from the XIII Corps along with McArthur's Division and Carr's Division from the XVI Corps. The units engaged against Fort Blakeley involved Veatch's Division and Andrews' Division (minus Bertram's brigade) from the XIII Corps, Garrard's Division from the XVI Corps and Steele's Pensacola Column. The Confederate order of battle is shown separately.

This order of battle covers the period of March–April 1865. For the Union and Confederate forces at the Battle of Mobile Bay from August 2–23, 1864, see: Mobile Bay order of battle.

== Abbreviations used ==
=== Military rank ===
- MG = Major general
- BG = Brigadier general
- Col = Colonel
- Ltc = Lieutenant colonel
- Maj = Major
- Cpt = Captain
- Lt = 1st lieutenant

=== Other ===
- w = wounded

== Army of West Mississippi ==
MG Edward R. S. Canby, 45,200

General Staff

- Chief-of-Staff: MG Peter J. Osterhaus
- Provost Marshal: BG George L. Andrews
- Aide-de-Camp: Brevet BG Cyrus B. Comstock
- Chief Engineer: Brevet Col Miles D. McAlester
- Asst. Adjutant General: Ltc Christian T. Christensen
- Asst. Inspector General: Ltc John M. Wilson
- Quartermaster: Ltc Charles G. Sawtelle
- Commissary of Subsistence: Ltc Chester Bingham Hinsdill

Division	Brigade	Regiments and others
Headquarters units	Engineer Brigade BG Joseph A. Bailey, 1,500	96th U.S.C.T.: Col John C. Cobb; 97th U.S.C.T.: Ltc George A. Harmount, Col George D. Robinson; 1st Company of Pontoniers: Cpt John J. Smith
Headquarters units	Siege Trains BG James Totten, 1,200	1st Indiana Heavy Artillery (7 companies): Col Benjamin F. Hays; 18th Battery, New York Light Artillery: Cpt Albert G. Mack

=== XIII Corps ===
MG Gordon Granger, 13,200, excluding 2nd and 3rd Brigades, 2nd Division

Division	Brigade	Regiments and others
1st Division; BG James C. Veatch	1st Brigade BG James R. Slack	99th Illinois Infantry (five companies): Ltc Asa C. Matthews; 47th Indiana Infantry: Ltc John A. McLaughlin; 21st Iowa Infantry: Ltc Salue G. VanAnda; 29th Wisconsin Infantry: Ltc Bradford Hancock
1st Division; BG James C. Veatch	2nd Brigade BG Elias S. Dennis	8th Illinois Infantry: Col Josiah A. Sheetz; 11th Illinois Infantry: Col James Henry Coates; 46th Illinois Infantry: Col Benjamin Dornblaser
1st Division; BG James C. Veatch	3rd Brigade Col William B. Kinsey	29th Illinois Infantry: Ltc John A Callicott; 30th Missouri Infantry (4 companies): Ltc William T. Wilkinson; 161st New York Infantry: Maj Willis E. Craig; 23rd Wisconsin Infantry: Maj Joseph E. Greene
1st Division; BG James C. Veatch	Artillery Cpt George W. Fox	4th Battery, Massachusetts Light Artillery: Lt George W. Taylor; 7th Battery, Massachusetts Light Artillery: Cpt Newman W. Storer
2nd Division	1st Brigade Col Henry Bertram	94th Illinois Infantry: Col John McNulta; 19th Iowa Infantry: Ltc John Bruce; 23rd Iowa Infantry: Col Samuel L. Glasgow; 20th Wisconsin Infantry: Ltc Henry A. Starr; Battery F, 1st Missouri Light Artillery: Cpt Joseph Foust
3rd Division; BG William P. Benton	1st Brigade Col David P. Grier	28th Illinois Infantry: Ltc Richard Ritter; 77th Illinois Infantry: Ltc John B. Reid; 96th Ohio Infantry (5 companies): Ltc Albert H. Brown; 35th Wisconsin Infantry: Col Henry Orff
3rd Division; BG William P. Benton	2nd Brigade Col Henry M. Day	91st Illinois Infantry: Ltc George A. Day; 50th Indiana Infantry (5 companies): Ltc Samuel T. Wells; 29th Iowa Infantry: Col Thomas H. Benton Jr.; 7th Vermont Infantry: Col William C. Holbrook
3rd Division; BG William P. Benton	3rd Brigade Col Conrad Krez	33rd Iowa Infantry: Col Cyrus H. Mackey; 77th Ohio Infantry: Ltc William E. Stevens; 27th Wisconsin Infantry: Cpt Charles H. Cunningham; 28th Wisconsin Infantry: Ltc Edmund B. Gray
3rd Division; BG William P. Benton	Artillery	21st Battery, New York Light Artillery: Cpt James Barnes; 26th Battery, New York Light Artillery: Lt Adam Beattie

=== XVI Corps ===
MG Andrew Jackson Smith, 16,000

Division	Brigade	Regiments and others
1st Division; BG John McArthur	1st Brigade Col William L. McMillen	33rd Illinois Infantry: Col Charles E. Lippincott; 26th Indiana Infantry: Col John G. Clark; 93rd Indiana Infantry: Col De Witt C. Thomas; 10th Minnesota Infantry: Ltc Samuel P. Jennison; 72nd Ohio Infantry: Ltc Charles G. Eaton; 95th Ohio Infantry: Col Jefferson Brumback
1st Division; BG John McArthur	2nd Brigade Col Lucius F. Hubbard	47th Illinois Infantry: Maj Edward Bonham; 5th Minnesota Infantry: Ltc William B. Gere; 9th Minnesota Infantry: Col Josiah F. Marsh; 11th Missouri Infantry: Maj Modesta J. Green; 8th Wisconsin Infantry: Ltc William B. Britton
1st Division; BG John McArthur	3rd Brigade Col William R. Marshall	12th Iowa Infantry: Maj Samuel G. Knee; 35th Iowa Infantry: Ltc William B. Keeler; 7th Minnesota Infantry: Ltc George Bradley; 33rd Missouri Infantry: Ltc William H. Heath
1st Division; BG John McArthur	Artillery	3rd Battery, Indiana Light Artillery: Cpt Thomas J. Ginn; 2nd Battery, Iowa Light Artillery: Cpt Joseph R. Reed
2nd Division; BG Kenner Garrard	1st Brigade Col John I. Rinaker	119th Illinois Infantry: Col Thomas J. Kinney; 122nd Illinois Infantry: Ltc James F. Drish (w, April 9), Maj James F. Chapman; 89th Indiana Infantry: Ltc Hervey Craven; 21st Missouri Infantry: Cpt Charles W. Tracy
2nd Division; BG Kenner Garrard	2nd Brigade BG James I. Gilbert	117th Illinois Infantry: Col Risdon M. Moore; 27th Iowa Infantry: Maj George W. Howard; 32nd Iowa Infantry: Ltc Gustavus A. Eberhart; 10th Kansas Infantry (4 companies): Ltc Charles S. Hills; 6th Minnesota Infantry: Ltc Hiram P. Grant
2nd Division; BG Kenner Garrard	3rd Brigade Col Charles L. Harris	58th Illinois Infantry (four companies): Cpt John Murphy; 52nd Indiana Infantry: Ltc Zalmon S. Main; 34th New Jersey Infantry: Col William Hudson Lawrence; 178th New York Infantry: Ltc John B. Gandolfo; 11th Wisconsin Infantry: Maj Jesse S. Miller
3rd Division; BG Eugene A. Carr	1st Brigade Col Jonathan B. Moore	72nd Illinois Infantry: Ltc Joseph Stockton; 95th Illinois Infantry: Col Leander Blanden; 44th Missouri Infantry: Cpt Frank G. Hopkins; 33rd Wisconsin Infantry: Ltc Horatio H. Virgin
3rd Division; BG Eugene A. Carr	2nd Brigade Col Lyman M. Ward	40th Missouri Infantry: Col Samuel A. Holmes; 49th Missouri Infantry: Col David P. Dyer; 14th Wisconsin Infantry: Maj Eddy F. Ferris
3rd Division; BG Eugene A. Carr	3rd Brigade Col James L. Geddes	81st Illinois Infantry: Ltc Andrew W. Rogers; 108th Illinois Infantry: Col Charles Turner; 124th Illinois Infantry: Brevet Col John H. Howe; 8th Iowa Infantry: Ltc William B. Bell
3rd Division; BG Eugene A. Carr	Artillery Brigade Cpt John W. Lowell	Cogswell's Battery Illinois Light Artillery: Lt William R. Elting; Battery G, 2nd Illinois Light Artillery: Lt Perry Wilch; 1st Battery, Indiana Light Artillery: Cpt Lawrence Jocoby; 14th Battery, Indiana Light Artillery: Cpt Francis W. Morse; 17th Battery, Ohio Light Artillery: Cpt Charles S. Rice

=== Column from Pensacola ===
MG Frederick Steele, 13,200

- Asst. Adjutant General: Maj John F. Lacey

Division	Brigade	Regiments and others
1st Division (Dist. of West Florida); BG John P. Hawkins, 5,500	1st Brigade BG William A. Pile	73rd U.S.C.T.: Ltc Henry C. Merriam; 82nd U.S.C.T.: Col Ladislas L. Zulavsky; 86th U.S.C.T.: Ltc George E. Yarrington
1st Division (Dist. of West Florida); BG John P. Hawkins, 5,500	2nd Brigade Col Hiram Scofield	47th U.S.C.T.: Ltc Ferdinand E. Peebles; 50th U.S.C.T.: Col Charles A. Gilchrist; 51st U.S.C.T.: Col A. Watson Webber
1st Division (Dist. of West Florida); BG John P. Hawkins, 5,500	3rd Brigade Col Charles W. Drew	48th U.S.C.T.: Col Frederick M. Crandal; 68th U.S.C.T.: Col J. Blackburn Jones (w, April 9); 76th U.S.C.T.: Maj William E. Nye
2nd Division (from XIII Corps); BG Christopher C. Andrews, 5,200	2nd Brigade Col Thomas Spicely	76th Illinois Infantry: Col Samuel T. Busey (w, April 9), Ltc Charles C. Jones; 97th Illinois Infantry: Ltc Victor Vifquain; 24th Indiana Infantry: Ltc Francis A. Sears; 69th Indiana Infantry (4 companies): Ltc Oran Perry (w, April 9), Cpt Lewis K. Harris
2nd Division (from XIII Corps); BG Christopher C. Andrews, 5,200	3rd Brigade Col Frederick W. Moore	37th Illinois Infantry: Col John Charles Black; 20th Iowa Infantry: Ltc Joseph B. Leake; 34th Iowa Infantry: Col George W. Clark; 83rd Ohio Infantry: Ltc William H. Baldwin; 114th Ohio Infantry: Col John H. Kelly
2nd Division (from XIII Corps); BG Christopher C. Andrews, 5,200	Artillery	2nd Battery, Connecticut Light Artillery: Cpt Walter S. Hotchkiss; 15th Battery, Massachusetts Light Artillery: Lt Albert Rowse
Cavalry Division (Dist. of West Florida); BG Thomas J. Lucas, 2,500	1st Brigade Col Morgan H. Chrysler	1st Louisiana Cavalry: Ltc Algernon S. Badger; 31st Massachusetts (mounted infantry): Ltc Edward P. Nettleton; 2nd New York Veteran Cavalry: Col Morgan H. Chrysler, Ltc Asa L. Gurney
Cavalry Division (Dist. of West Florida); BG Thomas J. Lucas, 2,500	2nd Brigade Ltc Andrew B. Spurling	1st Florida Cavalry: Cpt Francis Lyons; 2nd Illinois Cavalry: Maj Franklin Moore; 2nd Maine Cavalry: Maj Charles A. Miller
Cavalry Division (Dist. of West Florida); BG Thomas J. Lucas, 2,500	Artillery	2nd Battery, Massachusetts Light Artillery: Cpt William Marland

=== Cavalry ===
Bvt MG Benjamin Grierson

Division	Brigade	Regiments and others
1st Division; BG Joseph F. Knipe	1st Brigade Col Joseph Kargé	12th Indiana Cavalry: Maj William H. Calkins; 2nd New Jersey Cavalry: Ltc P. Jones Yorke; 4th Wisconsin Cavalry: Col Webster P. Moore
1st Division; BG Joseph F. Knipe	2nd Brigade Col Gilbert M. L. Johnson	10th Indiana Cavalry: Maj George R. Swallow; 13th Indiana Cavalry: Ltc William T. Pepper; 4th Tennessee Cavalry: Ltc Jacob M. Thornburgh
1st Division; BG Joseph F. Knipe	Artillery	14th Battery, Ohio Light Artillery: Cpt William Cary Myers

== Sources ==
- War of the Rebellion: The Official Records of the Union and Confederate Armies, Series I, Volume 49, part 1, page 105
- Jordan, Daniel W. III (2019). Operational Art and the Campaign for Mobile, 1864-1865: A Staff Ride Handbook (PDF). Fort Leavenworth, Kan.: Combat Studies Institute Press, US Army Combined Arms Center. ISBN 9781940804545. Archived from the original (PDF) on June 12, 2020. Unit strengths
