= Mobile campaign order of battle: Confederate =

The following Confederate Army units and commanders fought in the Mobile campaign of the American Civil War including the battles of Spanish Fort and Fort Blakeley. The Union order of battle is shown separately.

== Military rank ==
- MG = Major General
- BG = Brigadier General
- Col = Colonel
- Ltc = Lieutenant Colonel
- Maj = Major
- Cpt = Captain
- Lt = Lieutenant

== Field Deployment ==
=== Fort Blakeley ===
BG St. John R. Liddell (c)

Division	Brigade	Regiments and others
French's Division: BG Francis M. Cockrell (c)	Missouri Brigade Brigade Col Elijah Gates	1st/4th Missouri: Cpt Charles L. Edmondson; 2nd/6th Missouri: Ltc Stephen Cooper; 3rd/5th Missouri: Cpt Benjamin E. Guthrie; 1st/3rd Missouri Cavalry: Cpt Joseph H. Neal
French's Division: BG Francis M. Cockrell (c)	Mississippi Brigade Col Thomas N. Adair	4th Mississippi Infantry: Maj Thomas P. Nelson; 7th Mississippi Infantry Battalion: Cpt Samuel D. Harris; 35th Mississippi Infantry: Cpt George W. Oden; 36th Mississippi Infantry: Ltc Edward Brown; 39th Mississippi Infantry: Cpt C. W. Gallaher; 46th Mississippi Infantry: J. A. Barwick
Reporting directly	Alabama Brigade BG Thomas M. Bryan (c)	62nd Alabama (1st Reserves): Col Daniel Huger; 63rd Alabama (2nd Reserves): Ltc Junius A. Law
Reporting directly	Artillery Cpt John B. Grayson	1st Alabama Artillery; Tarrant’s Alabama Battery; Winston’s Tennessee Battery; 1st Mississippi Artillery; 1st Missouri Battery; Battery C, South Carolina Palmetto Battalion

=== Spanish Fort ===
BG Randall L. Gibson

Brigade	Regiments and others
Gibson's Brigade Col Francis L. Campbell	1st/16th/20th Louisiana Infantry: Ltc Robert H. Lindsay; 4th/13th/30th Louisiana Infantry; 19th Louisiana Infantry: Maj Camp Flournoy; 25th Regiment/4th Battalion Louisiana Infantry: Col Francis C. Zacharie; Sharpshooters Battalion: Col Francis L. Campbell
Holtzclaw's Brigade BG James T. Holtzclaw	18th Alabama Infantry: Cpt A.C. Greene; 32nd–58th Alabama Infantry: Col Bushrod Jones; 36th Alabama Infantry: Col Thomas H. Herndon; 38th Alabama Infantry: Cpt Charles E. Bussey
Ector's Brigade Col David Coleman	29th North Carolina Infantry: Cpt John W. Gudger; 39th North Carolina Infantry: Maj Paschal C. Hughes; 9th Texas Infantry: Ltc Miles A. Dillard; 10th Texas Cavalry (dismounted): Cpt Jacob Ziegler; 14th Texas Cavalry (dismounted): Ltc Abram Harris; 32nd Texas Cavalry (dismounted): Cpt Nathan Anderson
Artillery Col Isaac W. Patton	5th Company, Washington Artillery; Lumsden's Alabama Battery; Phillips' Tennessee Battery; Perry's Tennessee Battery; Garrity's Alabama Battery

== District of the Gulf ==
MG Dabney H. Maury

Division	Brigade	Regiments and others
Unassigned	Thomas' Brigade BG Bryan M. Thomas (c)	1st Alabama Reserves: Col Daniel E. Huger; 2nd Alabama Reserves: Ltc Junius A. Law; 21st Alabama Infantry: Ltc James M. Williams
Unassigned	Taylor's command Col Thomas H. Taylor	City Battalion – Special Service (four companies): Maj William Hartwell; Pelham Cadets Battalion: Capt P. Williams, Jr.
Unassigned	Holtzclaw's Brigade BG James T. Holtzclaw	18th Alabama Infantry: Cpt A.C. Greene; 32nd–58th Alabama Infantry: Col Bushrod Jones; 36th Alabama Infantry: Col Thomas H. Herndon; 38th Alabama Infantry: Cpt Charles E. Bussey
Unassigned	Maury's Command Col Henry Maury	15th Confederate Cavalry: Col Henry Maury; Tobin's Battery: Cpt Thomas F. Tobin
Unassigned	Sappers and Miners	Hutchinson's company: Lt R. Middleton; Vernon's company: Lt J. Armstrong
Liddell's Division; BG St. John R. Liddell (c)	Gibson's Brigade BG Randall L. Gibson	1st–16th–20th Louisiana Infantry: Ltc Robert H. Lindsay; 4th–13th–30th Louisiana Infantry; 19th Louisiana Infantry: Maj Camp Flournoy; 25th Regiment–4th Battalion Louisiana Infantry: Col Francis C. Zacharie; Sharpshooters Battalion: Col Francis L. Campbell
French's Division; BG Francis M. Cockrell (c)	Cockrell's Brigade (1st Missouri Brigade) Col James McCown (c)	1st–3rd Missouri Cavalry (dismounted): Cpt Joseph H. Neal; 1st–4th Missouri Infantry: Cpt Charles L. Edmondson; 2nd–6th Missouri Infantry: Ltc Stephen Cooper; 3rd–5th Missouri Infantry: Cpt Benjamin E. Guthrie; Steede's (Mississippi) Cavalry Battalion: Maj Abner C. Steede; Abbay's Battery: Cpt George F. Abbay
French's Division; BG Francis M. Cockrell (c)	Ector's Brigade Col David Coleman	29th North Carolina Infantry: Cpt John W. Gudger; 39th North Carolina Infantry: Maj Paschal C. Hughes; 9th Texas Infantry: Ltc Miles A. Dillard; 10th Texas Cavalry (dismounted): Cpt Jacob Ziegler; 14th Texas Cavalry (dismounted): Ltc Abram Harris; 32nd Texas Cavalry (dismounted): Cpt Nathan Anderson
French's Division; BG Francis M. Cockrell (c)	Sears' Brigade Col Thomas N. Adaire	4th Mississippi Infantry: Maj Thomas P. Nelson; 7th Mississippi Infantry Battalion: Cpt Samuel D. Harris; 35th Mississippi Infantry: Cpt George W. Oden; 36th Mississippi Infantry: Ltc Edward Brown; 39th Mississippi Infantry: Cpt C. W. Gallaher; 46th Mississippi Infantry: J. A. Barwick
Cavalry	Clanton's Brigade BG James H. Clanton (c)	3rd Alabama Reserves: Maj Solomon T. Strickland; 6th Alabama Cavalry: Ltc Washington T. Lary; 8th Alabama Cavalry: Ltc Thomas L. Faulkner; Keyser's detachment: Cpt Joseph C. Keyser
Cavalry	Armistead's Cavalry Brigade	8th Alabama Cavalry: Col Charles P. Ball; 16th Confederate Cavalry: Ltc Philip B. Spence; Lewis' Cavalry Battalion: Maj William V. Harrell

== Artillery reserves ==
Division	Brigade	Regiments and others
Left wing, defenses of Mobile; Col Charles A. Fuller	Maj Henry A. Clinch	1st Louisiana Artillery, Company C: Cpt John H. Lamon; 1st Louisiana Artillery, Company I: Cpt Edward G. Butler; Coffin's (Virginia) Artillery: Lt J. B. Humphreys; State Reserves: Cpt William H. Homer; State Reserves: Lt R. H. Bush; Barry's Battery: Lt Richard L. Watkins; Young's Battery: Cpt Alfred J. Young
Left wing, defenses of Mobile; Col Charles A. Fuller	Ltc L. Hoxton	Dent's Battery: Cpt Staunton H. Dent; Douglas' Battery: Lt Benjamin Hardin; Eufaula Battery: Lt William H. Woods; Fenner's Battery: Lt W. T. Cluverius; Garrity's Battery: Cpt James Garrity; Rice's Battery: Cpt T. W. Rice; Thrall's Battery: Cpt James C. Thrall
Right Wing, Defenses of Mobile; Col Melancthon Smith	Cobb's Battalion Cpt Cuthbert H. Slocomb	Philip's Battery: Cpt J. W. Philips; Ritter's Battery: Cpt William L. Ritter; Slocomb's Battery: Lt J. A. Chalaron
Right Wing, Defenses of Mobile; Col Melancthon Smith	Gee's Battalion Maj James T. Gee	Perry's Battery: Cpt Thomas J. Perry; Phelan's Battery: Cpt John Phelan; Turner's Battery: Cpt William B. Turner; 1st Alabama Artillery (detachment): Lt P. Lee Hammond
Right Wing, Defenses of Mobile; Col Melancthon Smith	Grayson's Battalion Cpt John B. Grayson	Cowan's Battery: Cpt James J. Cowan; Culpeper's Battery: Lt J. L. Moses; Tarrant's Battery: Cpt Edward Tarrant; Winston's Battery: Cpt William C. Winston
Right Wing, Defenses of Mobile; Col Melancthon Smith	Trueheart's Battalion Cpt Charles L. Lumsden	Lovelace's Battery: Lt William M. Selden; Lumsden's Battery: Lt A. C. Hargrove
Batteries; Col William E. Burnet	Battery Buchanan	Crew Gun–Boat Gaines: Cpt P. U. Murphy, CS Navy
Batteries; Col William E. Burnet	Battery Gladden Cpt Richard C. Bond	2nd Alabama Artillery, Companies C and E; 1st Louisiana Artillery, Companies B and G
Batteries; Col William E. Burnet	Battery McIntosh Maj W. C. Capers	1st Louisiana Artillery, Companies A and D; 1st Mississippi Artillery, Company L
Batteries; Col William E. Burnet	Battery Missouri Cpt James Gibney	2nd Louisiana Regiment, Companies E and K; Holmes' Battery
Batteries; Col William E. Burnet	Battery Tilghman	Green's (Kentucky) Battery: Lt H. S. Quesenberry
Batteries; Col William E. Burnet	Picket Fleet	1st Mississippi Artillery, four companies: Maj Jeff L. Wofford
	Other units	3rd Missouri Light Artillery: Lt T. B. Catron

== Sources ==
- War of the Rebellion: Official Records of the Union and Confederate Armies, Series I, Volume 49, part 1.
