= Mobile campaign order of battle =

The order of battle for the Mobile campaign includes:

- Mobile campaign order of battle: Confederate
- Mobile campaign order of battle: Union

== See also ==
- Battle of Mobile (disambiguation)
