= 89th Indiana Infantry Regiment =

89th Indiana Infantry
- Active: August 28, 1862–July 19, 1865
- Disbanded: July 19, 1865
- Country: United States
- Allegiance: Union
- Branch: XVI Corps
- Type: Infantry
- Size: Regiment
- Engagements: American Civil War: Battle of Munfordville; Expedition to Hernando; Expedition after Forest; Meridian Campaign; Red River Campaign; Battle of Pleasant Hill; Smith's Expedition to Tupelo; Smith's Expedition to Oxford; Expedition to DeSoto; Pursuit of Price; Battle of Westport; Battle of Nashville; Pursuit of Hood; Mobile Campaign; Battle of Fort Blakeley

89th Indiana Infantry Regiment was an infantry regiment that served in the Union Army in the Western Theater of the American Civil War.

== History ==
=== Service ===
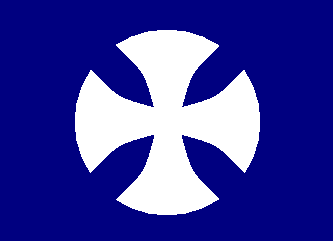
2nd Division of XVI Corps

The 89th Indiana was formed at Camp Morton on August 28, 1862, in Indianapolis, Indiana. Under the command of Colonel Charles D. Murray, Lieutenant Colonel Hervey Craven, Major George Cubberly, Major Samuel Henry and Major Joseph P. Winters.

It was disestablished in Mobile, Alabama, on July 19, 1865. The regiment lost 6 officers and 55 enlisted men killed during service and 3 officers and 188 enlisted men by disease, for a total of 252 casualties.

=== Battle of Munfordville ===
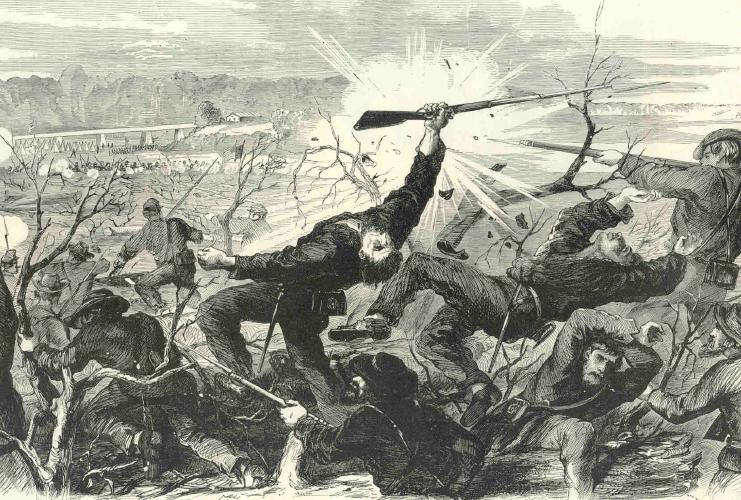
Battle of Munfordville as illustrated - in Harper's Weekly

On September 2, 1862, the 89th Indiana Regiment was sent to reinforce the Federal garrison at Munfordville, Kentucky. Upon reaching their destination, they were stationed to guard the railroad bridge across the Green River. On September 14, 1862, the 89th would see their first battle, which would become known as the Battle of Munfordville. They were attacked by the Confederate Army of Mississippi under Gen. Braxton Bragg. The 89th were driven within their fortifications and held off two major Confederate charges on the garrison. The Confederate Army began to conduct siege operations on September 15 and by September 16 had surrounded the smaller Union force, planting artillery on every hill lying around the fortification. The Confederates demanded surrender from Commander of the Union garrison Col. John T. Wilder, who was escorted under a flag of truce. Confederate Maj. Gen. Simon B. Buckner escorted him to view the strength of the Confederates, which convinced him that any attempt at fighting would only be a waste of life. On September 17, the entire Union force surrendered and was immediately paroled and sent towards General Buell's Army of the Ohio.

=== Fort Pickering ===
Fort Pickering Memphis Tennessee

On December 4, 1862, they were attached to the District of Memphis, Tennessee, in the 16th Army Corps. The 89th Indiana performed guard and fatigue duty at Fort Pickering (Memphis, Tennessee) located just south of Memphis, Tennessee. As Fort Pickering never saw battle, the 89th did not do any fighting there.

=== Expedition to Hernando ===
On August 16, 1863, the 89th Indiana went on an expedition from Memphis, Tennessee, to Hernando, Mississippi and encountered some Confederates near Panola, Mississippi.

=== Expedition after Forrest ===
On December 24, 1863, the 89th Indiana was part of the expedition to attempt to cut off Brigadier General Nathan Bedford Forrest's retreat. The overall Union strength was ten thousand strong, marching an average of twenty miles a day. Nonetheless, General Forrest still managed to escape across the Tennessee River.

=== Meridian Campaign ===
February 3, 1864, was the start of the Meridian Campaign, also known as the Battle of Meridian. The 89th Indiana had skirmished with Confederate forces on the march to Meridian. As they approached Meridian, they met stiffer resistance from the combined forces but steadily moved on and reach Meridian, Mississippi, on Feb 14th. By Feb 20th the Union victory was complete with the destruction of Confederate transportation facilities.

=== Red River Campaign ===
March 10, 1864, was the start of the Red River Campaign The 89th Indiana left Vicksburg, Mississippi, to take the Confederate Louisiana state capital of Shreveport, Louisiana, by traveling on transports down river and escorted into the Red River, fought at Henderson's hill, assisting in the capture of 270 men and 4 pieces of artillery, fighting at the battle of Pleasant Hill and in the various minor engagements incidental to the Red River Campaign.

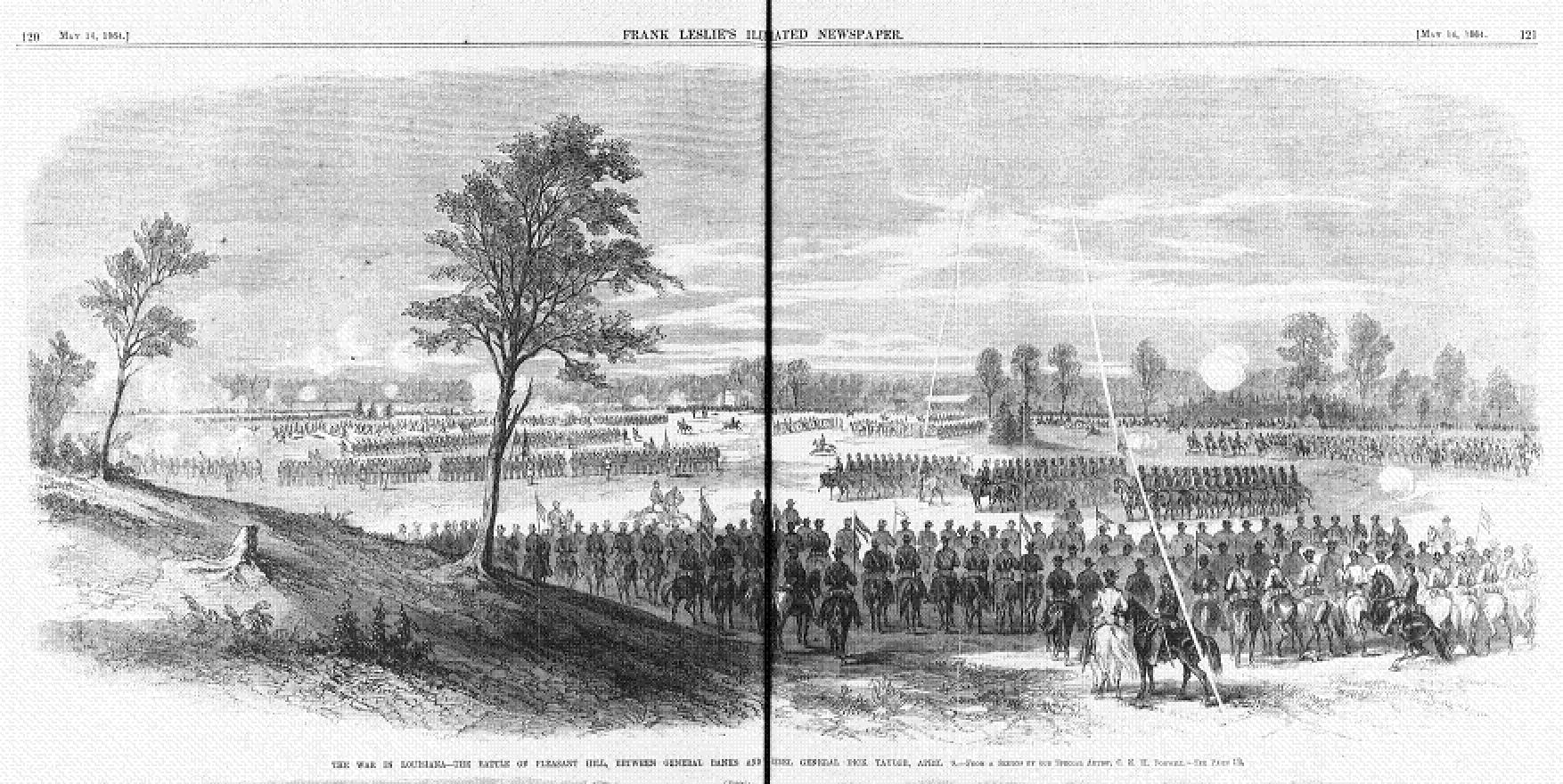
Battle of Pleasant Hill by C. E. H. Bonwell — as illustrated in Frank Leslie's Weekly, May 14, 1864

On April 9, 1864, the 89th Indiana was in the Battle of Pleasant Hill. The 89th Indiana was reinforcing the Union forces from the previous day's Battle of Mansfield. Officially, the battle was a Union victory; as the Confederates were successfully driven from the field.

The Battle is also the largest battle fought west of the Mississippi River. Despite the success with the battle, however, the campaign was a failure for the Union.

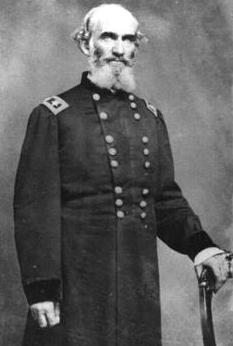
Major General Andrew Jackson Smith of the XVI Corps

=== Smith's Expeditions ===
On July 5, 1864, the 89th Indiana advanced south from Tennessee on Smith's Expedition to Tupelo to protect Maj. Gen. William T. Sherman’s supply line for his campaign against Atlanta. The 89th engaged in the Battle of Tupelo in Harrisburg on July 14th and 15th. The expedition was a success with the defeat of Stephen D. Lee and Nathan Bedford Forrest and the fulfilled mission of insuring William T. Sherman’s supply lines. On the 15th of July, the 89th started back to Memphis.

On August 1, 1864, 89th Indiana set out on Smith's expedition to Oxford. No major battles were fought on this expedition, just minor skirmishes with Confederates on the march to Oxford, Mississippi. On the 22nd, the Union force reached Oxford and burned both the brick blocks fronting on the public square and the Court-House in one conflagration. The houses of some prominent official rebels were also burned, such as that of Jacob Thompson, Confederate Secretary of the Interior. They marched back to Memphis as quickly as the extreme heat would allow.

=== Expedition to DeSoto ===
The 89th Indiana had been at the Jefferson Barracks in Missouri since September 8, 1864. When word was received of Confederates reaching DeSoto, Missouri, Major Gen. Andrew J. Smith led some of his troops out, with the 89th Indiana being one of these regiments. On September 20, 1864, they marched to DeSoto, Missouri, to meet the Confederate force of Major General Sterling Price.

=== Pursuit of Price ===
On October 1, 1864, 89th Indiana and the detachment of the Army of the Tennessee under Andrew J. Smith accompanied Major General Alfred Pleasonton after Major General Sterling Price to stop Price's campaign for Missouri. They fought at the Battle of Westport on October 23, 1864, a battle which would later become known as "The Gettysburg of the West." The resulting Union victory put an end to Price's campaign for Missouri. and rendered the Army of Missouri incapable of any future significant operations.

=== Battle of Nashville ===
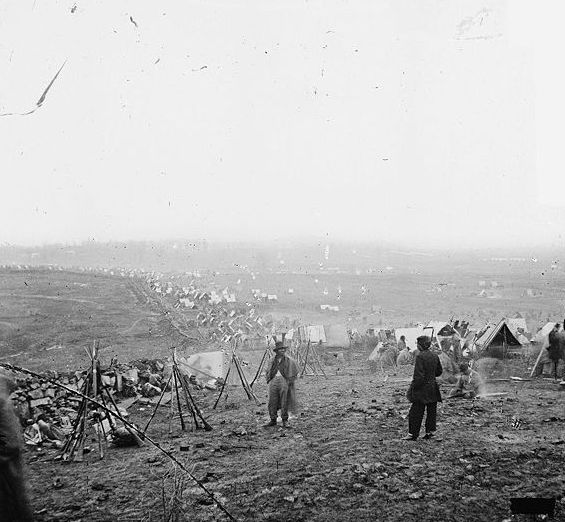
Federal outer line on December 16, 1864 Battle of Nashville

The 89th arrived in Nashville, Tennessee, by steamers on the Cumberland River to reinforce Nashville's defenses against Major General John Bell Hood's Army of Tennessee. On the opening day of the Battle of Nashville on December 15, 1864, the 1st Brigade under Colonel David Moore defended the main assault of the Confederates. By the end of the next day, December 16, 1864, the Confederate Army of Tennessee was no longer an effective fighting force.

=== Pursuit of Hood ===
On December 17, 1864, Major General John Bell Hood's Army of Tennessee was routed from the hills around Nashville, Tennessee, and fled toward the Franklin Pike, the only route of retreat left open to them. Behind them rose loud cheers from victorious Union soldiers. There were skirmishes throughout 120-mile retreat until the Army of Tennessee crossed the Tennessee River on December 28 and the pursuit was called off.

=== Mobile Campaign ===
On March 17, 1865, the Mobile Campaign began to take the city of Mobile, Alabama. The 89th Indiana, with the rest of the XVI Corps and XIII Corps, moved along the eastern shore of Mobile Bay, forcing the Confederates back into their defenses. Union forces then concentrated on the defenses of Mobile. The siege of Spanish Fort and Fort Blakely after the fall of the other major forts opened the city of Mobile itself to attack. On April 12, 1865, Union forces occupied Mobile.

=== Battle of Fort Blakely ===
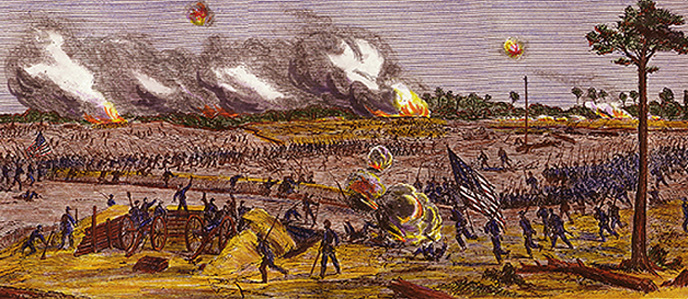
Storming of Fort Blakely

On March 26, 1865, the siege of Fort Blakely began. By April 1, Union forces had enveloped Spanish Fort, thereby releasing more troops to focus on Fort Blakely. The Confederate force at Spanish Fort fell on April 8. The final assault began the next day on the Confederate force at Fort Blakely. The 89th Indiana assisted in the capture of 3,700 Confederates and 40 pieces of artillery on their last major engagement of the Civil War.

== Commanders ==
Commanders of the 89th Indiana
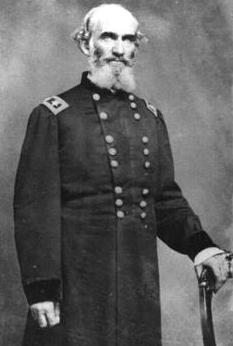
Major General Andrew Jackson Smith XVI Corps

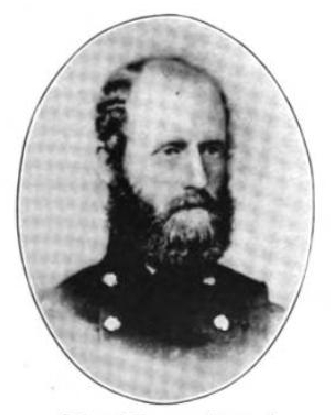
Brigadier General Kenner Garrard 2nd Division

Colonel John I. Rinaker 1st Brigade

Lieutenant Colonel Hervey Craven 89th Indiana Regiment

=== Other known commanders of the 89th Indiana ===
Major General William T. Sherman
Major General Nathaniel P. Banks
Major General Samuel Ryan Curtis
Major General George H. Thomas
Major General Edward Canby
Colonel John T. Wilder
Colonel Charles D. Murray
Colonel T.J. Kinney
Colonel David Moore

== See also ==
- List of Indiana Civil War regiments
