= 93rd Indiana Infantry Regiment =

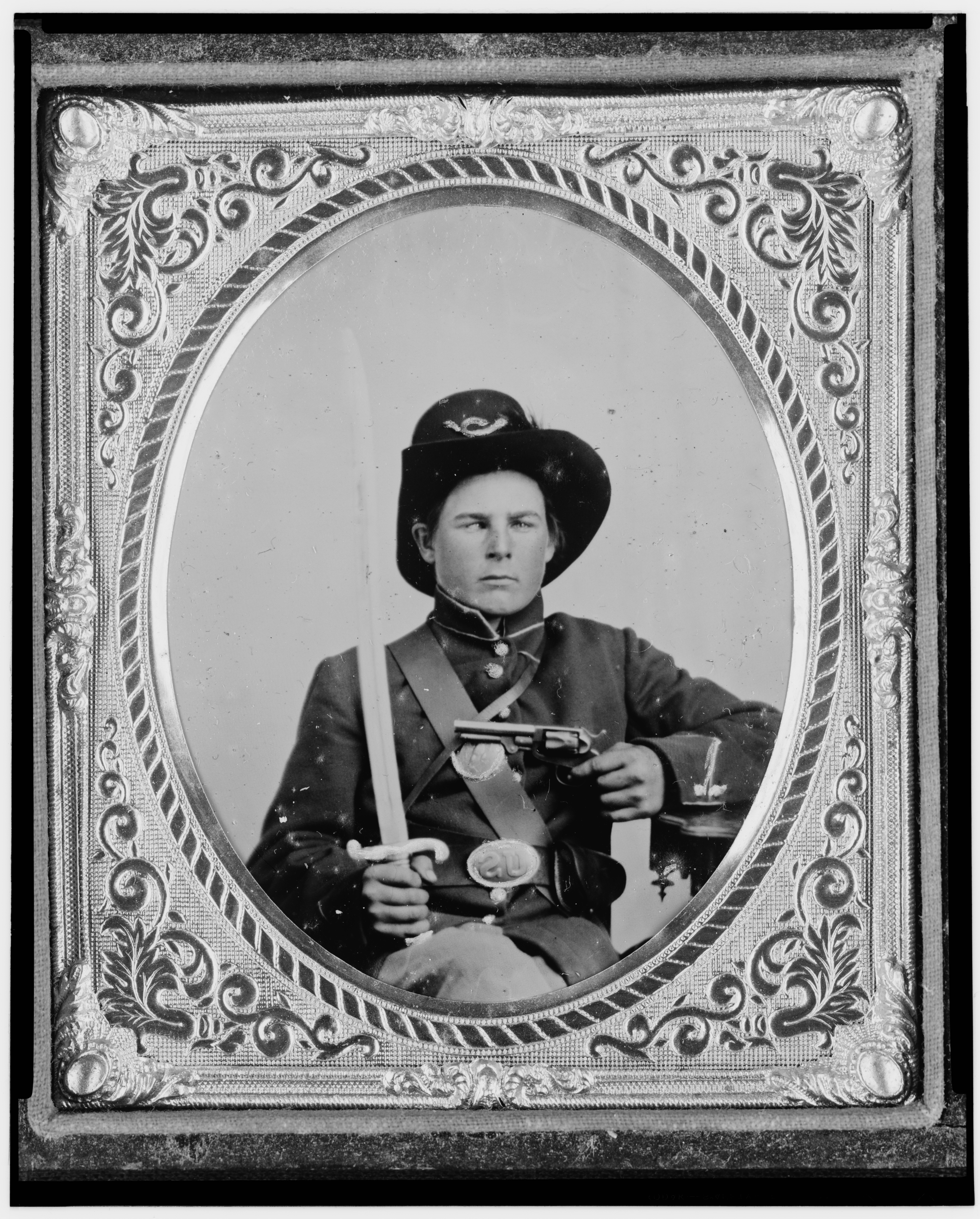
- Private George Kimbrue of Company C, 93rd Indiana from Florence, Indiana
- Active: August 1862 - August 1865
- Country: United States of America
- Allegiance: Union Army
- Branch: Infantry
- Engagements: American Civil War: Vicksburg Campaign; Siege of Vicksburg; Battle of Jackson; Forrest's Defense of Mississippi; Battle of Brice's Cross Roads; Smith's Expedition to Tupelo; Battle of Tupelo; Franklin-Nashville Campaign; Battle of Nashville; Mobile campaign (1865); Battle of Spanish Fort; Battle of Fort Blakeley

Commanders
- Colonel: Dewitt Clinton Thomas

The 93rd Regiment Indiana Infantry was an American infantry regiment that was organized at Madison, Indianapolis and New Albany, Indiana, August 16 to October 31, 1862, during the Civil War. The regiment marched out of Indiana for Memphis, Tennessee, on November 9, 1862, attached to the 5th Brigade, 13th Army Corps. By August, 1865 it was attached to the 1st Brigade, 1st Division, 16th Army Corps, Military Division West Mississippi.

== Service ==
The regiment was primarily on guard duty until March 1863. It then marched off to meet up with other contingents to join in the siege of Vicksburg, May 18–July 4. From there it advanced on Jackson, Mississippi, on the 4th and took part in the siege of Jackson, July 10–17. After its participation in this battle, it was moved to Memphis, Tennessee, for provost duty until May 1864.

The regiment continued with expeditions through Mississippi until June 10 when it fought in the Battle of Brice's Cross Roads or Tishamingo Creek near Guntown. It moved through Arkansas and Missouri in pursuit of retreating Confederate forces. It then saw action in the Battle of Nashville from December 15–16 and pursued Confederate commander Gen. Hood to the Tennessee River. It was sent to Vicksburg and then New Orleans for light duties for some time after this.

It was then sent to campaign against Mobile, Alabama, and its defenses on March 17, 1865, and then took part in the siege of Spanish Fort and Fort Blakely, March 26–April 8. The regiment was one of the lead unit for the assault and capture of Fort Blakely on April 9. Next it marched with the army and captured Mobile on April 12. From there it moved on to Montgomery and had guard duty there until May 10 after the surrender of the Confederacy. The regiment was finally mustered at Gainesville, Alabama, on August 10, 1865, for inspections, and awarding citations. It was on guard duty in Alabama and Mississippi for part of the Reconstruction period until it was finally sent home and disbanded.

== Casualties ==
The regiment lost only one officer and 37 enlisted men in action, and three officers and 250 enlisted men by disease, totaling 291 casualties.

== Commanders ==
- Colonel Dewitt Clinton Thomas: October 1862 - August 1862

== See also ==
- List of Indiana Civil War regiments
