= 161st New York Infantry Regiment =

- Active: October 27, 1862–November 12, 1865
- Disbanded: November 12, 1865
- Country: United States
- Allegiance: Union
- Branch: Infantry
- Size: Regiment
- Engagements: American Civil War: Battle of Plains Store; Siege of Port Hudson; Battle of Kock's Plantation; Second Battle of Sabine Pass; Red River Campaign; Battle of Sabine Cross Roads; Mobile Campaign; Battle of Spanish Fort; Battle of Fort Blakeley

Insignia
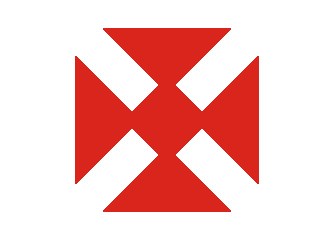
- 1st Division, XIX Corps

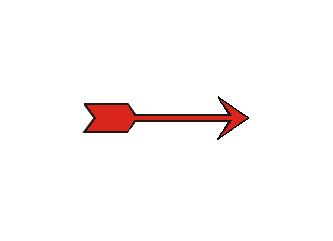
- XVII Corps

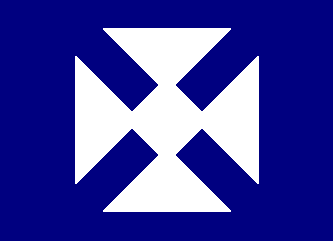
- 2nd Division, Reserve, XIX Corps

The 161st New York Infantry Regiment was an infantry regiment of the Union Army during the American Civil War.

== Service ==
The regiment was organized in Elmira, New York and was mustered in for a three-year enlistment on October 27, 1862; it was composed of companies from Chemung, Steuben, Schuyler, Chenango and Broome Counties. During this time, a typhoid epidemic caused many deaths, with subsequent desertions both at Elmira and in New York City.

The regiment left the State December 4, 1862; it served in Grover's Division, Department of the Gulf, from December, 1862; in 2d Brigade, Augur's Division, from December 31, 1862; in the 3d Brigade, Augur's Division, 19th Corps, from January 21, 1863; in 3d Brigade, 1st Division, 19th Corps, from March, 1863; in the 1st Brigade, 1st Division, 19th Corps, from August 15, 1863; in the Engineer Brigade, Department of the Gulf, from June, 1864; with the 17th Corps from August 14, 1864; in the 3d Brigade, 2d Division, Reserve, 19th Corps, from August 17, 1864; at Columbus, Kentucky, from October 26, 1864; in the 3d Brigade, 2d Division, Reserve, 19th Corps, at Memphis, Tennessee, from November 20, 1864; in the 4th Brigade, Reserve, Military Division of West Mississippi, from December 4, 1864; in 3d Brigade, 1st Division, 13th Corps, from February, 1865; in the District of Florida in June, 1865.

The spring 1863 attack on Port Hudson and the battle at Donaldsonville caused many casualties; illness at New Iberia caused many deaths while the autumn attack on Sabine Pass resulted in many captured. New recruits arrived in the winter of 1863–4 in time for the Red River Campaign. At the Battle of Sabine Cross Roads, many were wounded and captured, while in the summer many deaths from chronic diarrhea occurred at Morganza. New recruits again arrived in the fall, while the beginning of 1865 saw a steamboat accident with drownings and injuries. In the spring, the regiment participated in the Mobile Campaign, then traveled to Florida.

They were in the Department of Florida from July, 1865, and assigned to Fort Jefferson, Florida in Aug. 1865; the regiment was honorably discharged and mustered out November 12, 1865, at Tallahassee, Florida.

== Total strength and casualties ==
During its service the regiment lost by death, killed in action, 1 officer, 32 enlisted men; of wounds received in action, 23 enlisted men; of disease and other causes, 250 enlisted men; total, 1 officer, 305 enlisted men; aggregate, 306; of whom 13 enlisted men died in the hands of the enemy.

== Commanders ==
- Colonel Gabriel T. Harrower
- Colonel Henry G. Harrower
- Lieutenant Colonel Marvin D. Stillwell
- Lieutenant Colonel William B. Kinsey
- Major Charles Straun
- Major Willis E. Craig

== See also ==
- List of New York Civil War regiments
