= Mobile order of battle =

Mobile order of battle may refer to:

- Mobile campaign order of battle
- Battle of Mobile Bay order of battle

== See also ==
- Battle of Mobile (disambiguation)
- Mobile (disambiguation)
