= 7th Vermont Infantry Regiment =

- Flag of Vermont, 1837–1923
- Active: March 10, 1862 to March 14, 1866
- Disbanded: April 6, 1866
- Allegiance: (United States) United States; Union
- Branch: United States Army; Union Army
- Type: Infantry
- Engagements: Battle of Baton Rouge; Battle of Gonzales Station; Mobile Campaign; Battle of Spanish Fort; Battle of Whistler, AL; CSA Surrender at Citronelle, AL

Commanders
- Colonel: George T. Roberts

The 7th Vermont Infantry Regiment was a three years' infantry regiment in the Union Army during the American Civil War. It served in the Western Theater, predominantly in Louisiana and Florida, from February 1862 to March 1866. It was the longest serving Vermont regiment during the war.

Seventh Vermont Regiment was mustered into Federal service on February 12, 1862, at Rutland, Vermont. It was engaged in, or present at, the 1862 first Siege of Vicksburg, Battle of Baton Rouge, Battle of Gonzales Station, the Mobile Campaign and Spanish Fort, and Whistler, Alabama.

== Service ==
The 7th was mustered into the U. S. service at Rutland, on Wednesday, February 12, 1862, for a three years' term. Its initial commander was Colonel George T. Roberts of Burlington with Volney S Fullman of Ludlow serving as Lieutenant Colonel.

Greatly to the disappointment of its members, (Note: They wanted to serve with the other Vermont regiments in the Army of the Potomac) it was ordered to join Gen. Butler's southern expedition. The Regiment proceeded from Rutland on March 10, 1862, to New York City, boarding the sailing ships Premier and Tammerlane, and sailed to Ship Island (Mississippi) sailed from New York, on Monday, March 10.

== Western theater ==
The Premier arrived on Saturday, April 5 and Tammerlane on the following Thursday, April 10 at Ship Island. On Saturday, May 3, Companies B, C, and part of D boarded the gunboats USS New London and USS Calhoun and were sent to capture Fort Pike, which guarded the entrance to Lake Pontchartrain. They found the Confederates had just evacuated the fort. They occupied it without opposition and set about repairing the damage inflicted by the Confederates as they left. The rest of the regiment was shipped to Carrollton, New Orleans, on the Steamer Whitman.

On May 15, 1862, the Regiment, minus those at Fort Pike, sailed on the Iberville to Baton Rouge.

On June 19, 1862, eight companies boarded the steamers Ceres and Morning Light for the ill-conceived and under-manned expedition to lay siege to Vicksburg, Mississippi, arriving near Vicksburg on the 25th. The Siege of Vicksburg was abandoned on July 24, and the Regiment returned to Baton Rouge on July 26, with 100 of the 800 men who went up the river still fit for duty.

The Battle of Baton Rouge took place on Tuesday, August 5, 1862, a very foggy day. Many units fired on other Union troops, with the 7th firing, on orders of Brigadier General Thomas Williams, firing into the neighboring 21st Indiana Regiment. During the battle, Williams was killed and the 7th's Commander, Colonel George T. Roberts, was mortally wounded, dying two days later. The Confederate attack was defeated.

Before the battle, no preparations, such as digging entrenchments, nor any defensive plans were made, despite the knowledge that CS General Breckinridge had a large force nearby. After the battle, General Benjamin Butler directed blame for Union confusion and poor performance on the 7th, including firing on other Union troops and withdrawing from the front lines during the battle. The "withdrawal" was the evacuation of the hospital, including a large number of 7th Vermont troops, to the river bank to keep them safe. The allegations of Butler poisoned his relations with the Regiment, whose Officers were aware of Butler's continued Presidential ambitions. It was their opinion that Butler, though he wasn't at the battle, might be blamed for the poor performance of the troops in the battle and decided to scapegoat the Vermont Regiment because it represented the least politically powerful State that had troops in the battle. Butler forbade the Regiment permission to put the battle honor "Baton Rouge" on their battle flag and prohibited their carrying the colors. Permission to carry was later restored.

=== Florida campaign ===
Butler became aware that the commander of the forts south of Pensacola, Florida, was not happy with the conduct and performance of one of his regiments, so 7th Vermont was sent there in exchange for the 6th New York Volunteer Infantry (Wilson's Zouaves). The Regiment boarded the steam tugboat Nassau on Thursday, November 13, 1862, arriving in Escambia Bay the next day. The southern summers proved very difficult for troops from the climate of Vermont to endure, and the ranks were greatly depleted by yellow fever, malaria, etc.

The Regiment performed garrison duties at Fort Barrancas and Fort Pickens from November 1862 until August 1864. It was engaged in the defense of important fortifications at Pensacola and skirmished with the enemy at several points in the vicinity.

In early February 1864, a detail of Company B established an outpost at Point Washington, Florida on Choctawhatchee Bay to receive refugees and runaway slaves. They would be sent to the forts where white males would be enlisted in the 1st Florida Cavalry Regiment (Union) and black male slaves into the 82nd or 86 U.S. Colored Infantry. On February 8, a detachment proceeded to Haine's Bluff where they captured Company E, 4th Florida Infantry Battalion without firing a shot. Before they could return to Point Washington, they were run down by Company A, and a detachment of Company E, 5th Florida Cavalry Battalion that freed the prisoners and captured half of the Union troops involved in the raid. After this the outpost at Point Washington was abandoned.

On February 13, 1864, 110 new recruits arrived from Vermont. During February, soldiers of the 7th reenlisted for three years or the duration of the War and had their designation changed to 7th Regiment Vermont Veteran Volunteers. On July 20, 1864, a Union force, including four companies of the 7th, were dispatched from Fort Barrancas on a raid up to Pollard, Alabama. Along the way, they were attacked by Rebel troops and a skirmish ensued at the Gonzalez Farm. On Tuesday, August 30, 1864, the original members not reenlisted were mustered out. All but 58, however, had enlisted for another term and, in spite of the great reduction of the regiment by disease, it was continued in the field as a veteran organization.

=== Mobile campaign ===
On August 10, 1864, the 7th (without the new recruits) boarded the steamer Hudson to travel back to Vermont for a reenlistment furlough, arriving in Brattleboro August 26. The Regiment reassembling there on 27 September 1864. They departed on the 30th and arrived in New York City on October 1, boarding the steamer "Cassandra" on October 3 for New Orleans, and arriving there on the 13th.

Seventh Vermont was part of Gen. Gordon Granger's 13th Corps. for the Mobile Campaign, participating in the Siege of Spanish Fort, a battle at Whistler, Alabama, and the surrender of the CS Army of Mobile at Citronelle, Alabama. During the Siege of Spanish fort the 7th was assigned to the siege of Fort McDermett. During that siege the Captain and 20 men of Company K were captured and sent to a POW camp.

=== Texas assignment ===
On May 30, 1865, the Regiment boarded the steamer "Starlight" for Mobile, where the men were transferred to the steamer "General Sedgwick" and shipped to Texas. They arrived June 5 to become part of the "Army of Observation" along the Rio Grande, keeping an eye on Maximilian's French Army there. The regiment was stationed at Clarksville and later at Brownsville, TX. They were officially mustered out on Wednesday, March 14, 1866, traveling as a group back to Brattleboro, where the unit disbanded on April 6, 1866.

== Regimental Organization ==
=== Staff ===
Through its service, the staff officers were:

- Colonels — George T. Roberts, William C. Holbrook, David B. Peck, Henry M. Porter
- Lieutenant-Colonels — Volney S. Fullam, David B. Peck, Henry M. Porter, Edgar N. Bullard
- Majors — William C. Holbrook, Henry M. Porter, Edgar N. Bullard, Darwin A. Smalley, George E. Croff.
- Surgeon — Frank W. Kelley
- Assistant Surgeon — Enoch Blanchard
- Chaplain — Rev. Henry M. Frost

=== Companies ===
The companies at the onset were recruited and commanded as follows:

- Company A — Recruited in Burlington, VT, on January 14, 1862, Capt. David B. Peck commanding
- Company B — Recruited in Brandon, VT, on January 6, 1862, Capt. William Cronan commanding
- Company C — Recruited in Middlebury, VT, on January 15, 1862, Henry M. Porter commanding
- Company D — Recruited in Rutland, VT, on January 7, 1862, John B. Kilburn commanding
- Company E — Recruited in Johnson, VT, on January 9, 1862, Daniel Landon commanding
- Company F — Recruited in Swanton, VT, on January 9, 1862, Lorenzo D. Brooks commanding
- Company G — Recruited in Cavendish, VT, on January 31, 1862, Salmon Dutton commanding
- Company H — Recruited in Woodstock, VT, on February 3, 1862, Mahlon M. Young commanding
- Company I — Recruited in Poultney, VT, on February 1, 1862, Charles C. Ruggles commanding
- Company K — Recruited in Northfield, VT, on February 1, 1862,| David P. Barber commanding

== Affiliations, battle honors, detailed service, and casualties ==
=== Organizational affiliation ===
Its assignments are as follows:

- Attached to Phelps' 1st Brigade, Department of the Gulf, to October 1862
- District of West Florida to December 1863.
- Defences of New Orleans, Department of the Gulf, to November, 1864
- 2nd Brigade, Reserve Division, Department of the Gulf, to February 1865
- 2nd Brigade, 3rd Division, XIII Corps, Department of the Gulf to June 1865.
- Department of Texas to March 1866.

=== List of battles ===
The official list of battles in which the regiment bore a part:

- Battle of Baton Rouge
- Battle of Gonzales Station
- Mobile Campaign
- Battle of Spanish Fort
- Battle of Whistler, AL
- CSA Surrender at Citronelle, AL

=== Detailed service ===
The 7th Vermont's detailed service is as follows

==== 1862 ====
- Left State for New York March 10, 1862
- Left State New York March 14 for Ship
- Arrived at Ship Island April 7 and 10.
- Duty at Ship Island, till May 13, 1862. (Cos. "B," "C" and "D" detached at Fort Pike May 5 to June 13.)
- Regiment moved to New Orleans, La., May 13–16.
- At Carrollton till June 15.
- Moved to Baton Rouge June 15–16.
- Expedition from Baton Rouge to Vicksburg, Miss., and operations against Vicksburg June 20-July 26.
- Hamilton's Plantation, near Grand Gulf, June 24.
- Battle of Baton Rouge August 5. Evacuation of Baton Rouge August 20.
- Duty at Carrollton till October 13.
- Ordered to Pensacola, Fla., October 13
- Garrison duty there till February 20, 1863
- Reconnaissance to Oakfield December 29

==== 1863 ====
- Garrison, Forts Barrancas and Pickens, till June 19, 1863
- Expedition to Oakfield February 17, 1863.
- Duty at Barrancas and at Santa Rosa Island till August, 1864.

==== 1864 ====
- Garrison Point Washington February 9, 1864 (Co. "B")
- Expedition from Barrancas toward Pollard, AL, July 21–25, 1864
- Gonzales Station July 22
- Old members mustered out August 10, 1864
- Veterans absent on furlough in Vermont, August 10 to September 27
- Left State for Department of the Gulf September 30
- Sailed from New York to New Orleans, La., October 4
- Arrived October 13
- Duty at New Orleans till February 19, 1865

==== 1865 ====
- Moved to Mobile Point, Ala., February 19
- Campaign against Mobile and its Defences March 17-April 12
- Siege of Spanish Fort and Fort Blakely March 26-April 8
- Fort Blakely April 9
- Occupation of Mobile April 12
- Action at Whistler's Station April 13
- Expedition to Mc Intosh Bluff on Tombigbee River April 19-May 9
- At Mobile till June 2
- Moved to Brazos Santiago, Texas, June 2–5
- To Clarksville June 14
- Duty there till August 2
- At Brownsville till March, 1866.
- Mustered out March 14, 1866.

=== Casualties ===
The total strength of the 7th was 1,572 members, of whom 13 were killed or died of wounds, 405 died of disease, 6 in prison and 15 by accident. It was longer in the service than any other Vermont regiment, lost more members from sickness and a larger number of its members reenlisted than any other Vermont organization. In total. The regiment lost during service 3 Officers and 10 Enlisted men killed and mortally wounded and 4 Officers and 403 Enlisted men by disease for an aggregate of 420. (Note: Benedict has this breakdown of 11 men killed and mortally wounded, 15 dead from accident, 6 dead in Confederate prisons, and 379 dead of disease, for a campaign loss of 411 men, plus another 242 discharged for disability, primarily from disease, reaching a total of 649.)
