= Samuel McConnell (Medal of Honor) =

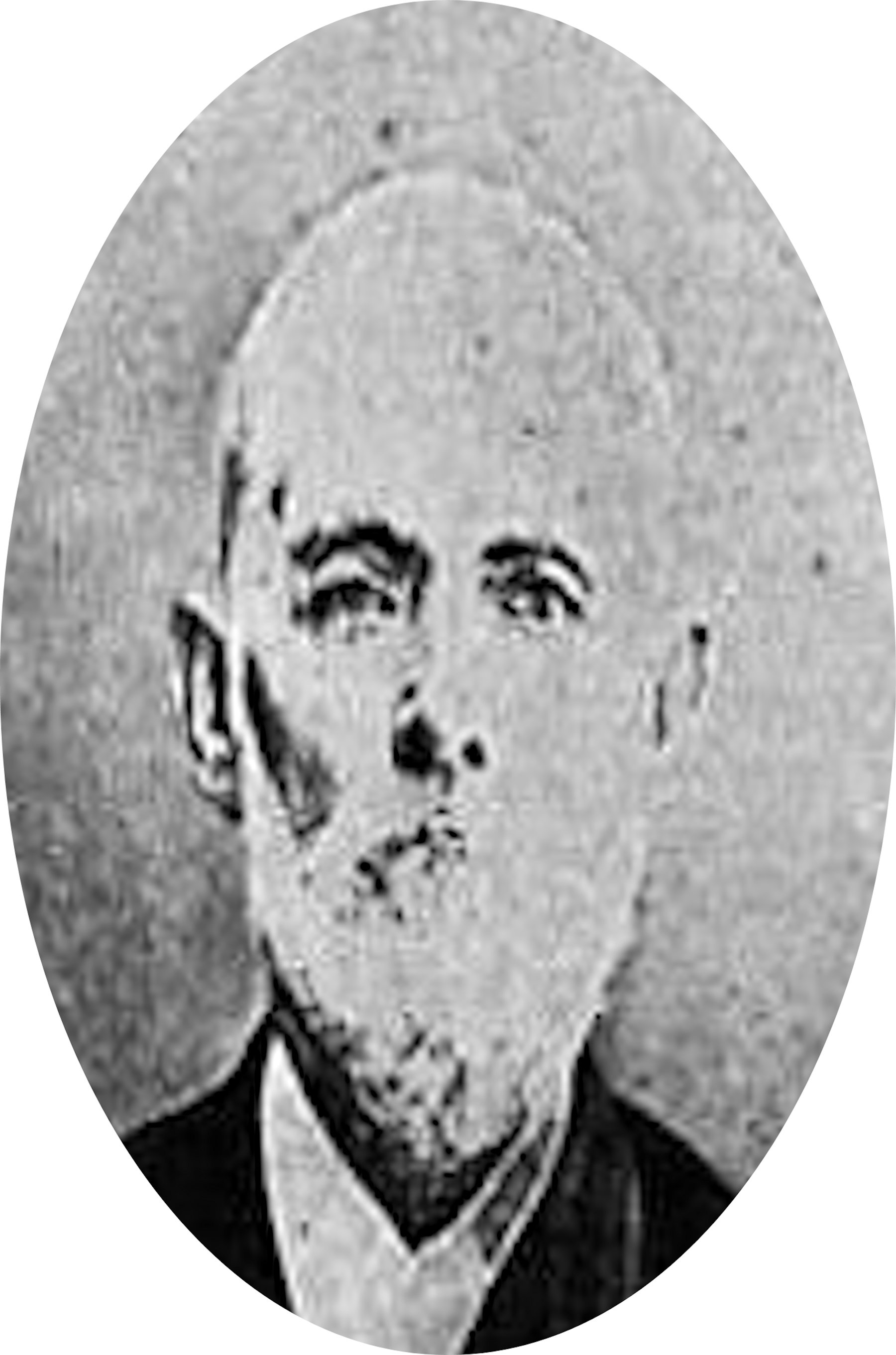
- Samuel McConnell in 1910
- Born: June 1, 1830; Belmont County, Ohio
- Died: March 26, 1915 (aged 84) Havelock, Nebraska
- Allegiance: Union
- Branch: Union Army
- Service years: 1861-1865
- Rank: Captain
- Commands: Company H, 119th Illinois Infantry Regiment
- Conflicts: American Civil War; Battle of Fort Blakeley
- Awards: Medal of Honor

Samuel McConnell (June 1, 1830 - March 26, 1915) was a Union soldier who received the Medal of Honor for capturing a Confederate flag on April 9, 1865, during the Battle of Fort Blakeley.

== Biography ==
Samuel was born in Ohio in 1830 to Joseph McConnell (1806–1888) and Judith Jane Sweeney (1808–1893). On January 6, 1853, Samuel married Elizabeth Worley and had 4 children with her: Joseph Cass (1853–1936), Samuel Frank (1855–1938), Elizabeth Ella (1859–1933) and Richard McConnell (1861-19??).

When Samuel was 31 in 1861, he enlisted in the Union Army and was placed in Company H, of the 119th Illinois Infantry Regiment and on April 9, 1865, During the Battle of Fort Blakeley: "While leading his company in an assault, Capt. McConnell braved an intense fire that mowed down his unit. Upon reaching the breastworks, he found that he had only one member of his company with him, Pvt. Wagner. He was so close to an enemy gun that the blast knocked him down a ditch. Getting up, he entered the gun pit, the gun crew fleeing before him. About 30 paces away he saw a Confederate flag bearer and guard which he captured with the last shot in his pistol."

Samuel was awarded the Medal of Honor for his service on July 12, 1865. Following the war, Samuel worked as a farmer in Nebraska until his death in 1915.
