= 36th Alabama Infantry Regiment =

Infantry regiment of the Confederate States Army

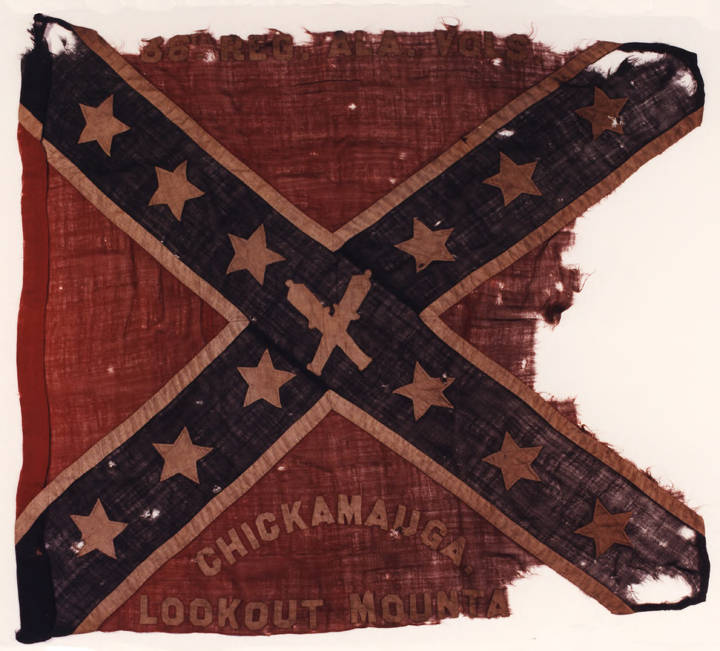
- Battle flag of the regiment, issued early 1864
- Active: 12 May 1862 – 4 May 1865
- Country: Confederate States of America
- Branch: Confederate States Army
- Type: Infantry
- Engagements: Battle of Resaca; Battle of Atlanta

Commanders
- Notable commanders: Lewis Thompson Woodruff

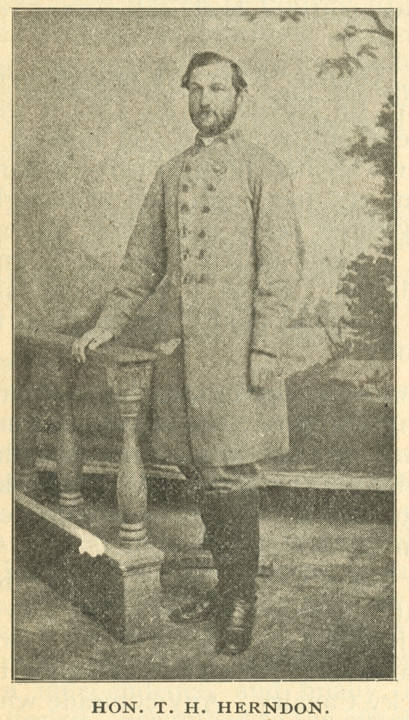
Col. Thomas H. Herndon

The 36th Alabama Infantry Regiment was an infantry regiment that served in the Confederate Army during the American Civil War.

== History ==
The 36th Alabama Infantry Regiment was organized at Mount Vernon Arsenal on 12 May 1862. Robert Hardy Smith was colonel, Lewis Thompson Woodruff lieutenant colonel, and Thomas Hord Herndon major. The regiment spent a month there, and helped build defenses at Oven and Choctaw Bluffs. It was part of the garrison of Mobile, Alabama between August 1862 and April 1863, when it was sent to Tullahoma to join the Army of Tennessee.

At Tullahoma, the 36th Alabama was brigaded under Henry DeLamar Clayton together with the 32nd and 58th Consolidated, 18th, and 38th Alabama Infantry Regiments. Clayton's brigade was part of Alexander P. Stewart's division. The regiment participated in the retreat of the army during the Tullahoma campaign and fought in the Battle of Chickamauga, in which it lost 125 men killed and wounded. The regiment suffered light casualties at Battle of Lookout Mountain but lost a large number in killed, wounded, and captured at the Battle of Missionary Ridge.

The regiment encamped at Dalton with the army during the winter of 1863 to 1864. In the Atlanta campaign, it fought in the Battle of Rocky Face Ridge, Battle of Resaca, Battle of New Hope Church, the Battle of Atlanta. The 36th Alabama lost roughly 300 men in action after departing Dalton, and at the Battle of Jonesboro was involved in particularly heavy fighting, losing a quarter of those present. The regiment went with the army into Middle Tennessee during the Franklin–Nashville Campaign. It lost roughly 60 men at Battle of Nashville but was able to survive as an organized force following the battle.

The regiment and the rest of James T. Holtzclaw's brigade was sent to Mobile to garrison Spanish Fort. In the Mobile campaign it lost 110 killed, wounded, and captured. Following the evacuation of Mobile, the regiment surrendered at Meridian, Mississippi in April 1865. Since the beginning of the Atlanta Campaign, where it had mustered 460 effectives, the regiment had lost 470 men and 21 officers, mostly killed and wounded.

== Commanders ==
- Colonel Robert Hardy Smith
- Colonel Lewis Thompson Woodruff
- Colonel Thomas Hord Herndon

== See also ==
- List of Confederate units from Alabama
