= 28th Wisconsin Infantry Regiment =

Union Army infantry regiment

- Flag of Wisconsin
- Active: October 14, 1862 – August 23, 1865
- Country: United States
- Allegiance: Union
- Branch: Infantry
- Size: Regiment
- Engagements: American Civil War: Vicksburg Campaign; Battle of Helena; Little Rock Campaign; Battle of Bayou Fourche; Red River Campaign; Camden Expedition; Mobile campaign; Battle of Spanish Fort

Commanders
- Colonel: James M. Lewis
- Colonel: Edmund B. Gray

The 28th Wisconsin Infantry Regiment was a volunteer infantry regiment that served in the Union Army during the American Civil War.

== Service ==
The 28th Wisconsin was organized at Milwaukee, Wisconsin, and mustered into Federal service October 14, 1862. Six companies were from Waukesha County, Wisconsin, four companies were from Walworth County, Wisconsin.

The regiment was mustered out on August 23, 1865.

== Casualties ==
The 28th Wisconsin suffered 1 officer and 12 enlisted men killed in action or who later died of their wounds, plus another 6 officers and 221 enlisted men who died of disease, for a total of 240 fatalities.

== Commanders ==
- Colonel James M. Lewis
- Colonel Edmund B. Gray

== Battles Fought ==
- Battle on 24 March 1863
- Battle on 26 April 1863
- Battle at Helena, Arkansas, on 4 July 1863
- Battle at Montana Elba, Arkansas, on 30 March 1864
- Battle at Mark's Mills, Arkansas, on 25 April 1864
- Battle on 19 January 1865
- Battle at Spanish Fort, Alabama, on 27–31 March 1865
- Battle at Spanish Fort, Alabama, on 2–4 April 1865

== See also ==
- List of Wisconsin Civil War units
- Wisconsin in the American Civil War
