= Lewis Woodruff =

Lewis Woodruff may refer to:

- Lewis Bartholomew Woodruff (1809–1875), American judge
- Lewis Thompson Woodruff (1816–1869), officer in the Confederate States Army
