= 36th Mississippi Infantry Regiment =

- Active: 1862-1865
- Country: Confederate States of America
- Allegiance: Mississippi
- Branch: Confederate States Army
- Type: Infantry
- Size: Regiment
- Battles: American Civil War: Siege of Corinth; Battle of Iuka; Second Battle of Corinth; Siege of Vicksburg; Atlanta campaign; Battle of Franklin; Battle of Nashville; Battle of Fort Blakeley

The 36th Mississippi Infantry Regiment was an infantry unit of the Confederate States Army. Formed in 1862, mostly of men from Copiah County, Mississippi, the 36th Regiment fought in many battles of the Western Theater of the American Civil War before being captured at Fort Blakely, Alabama in the closing days of the conflict.

== History ==
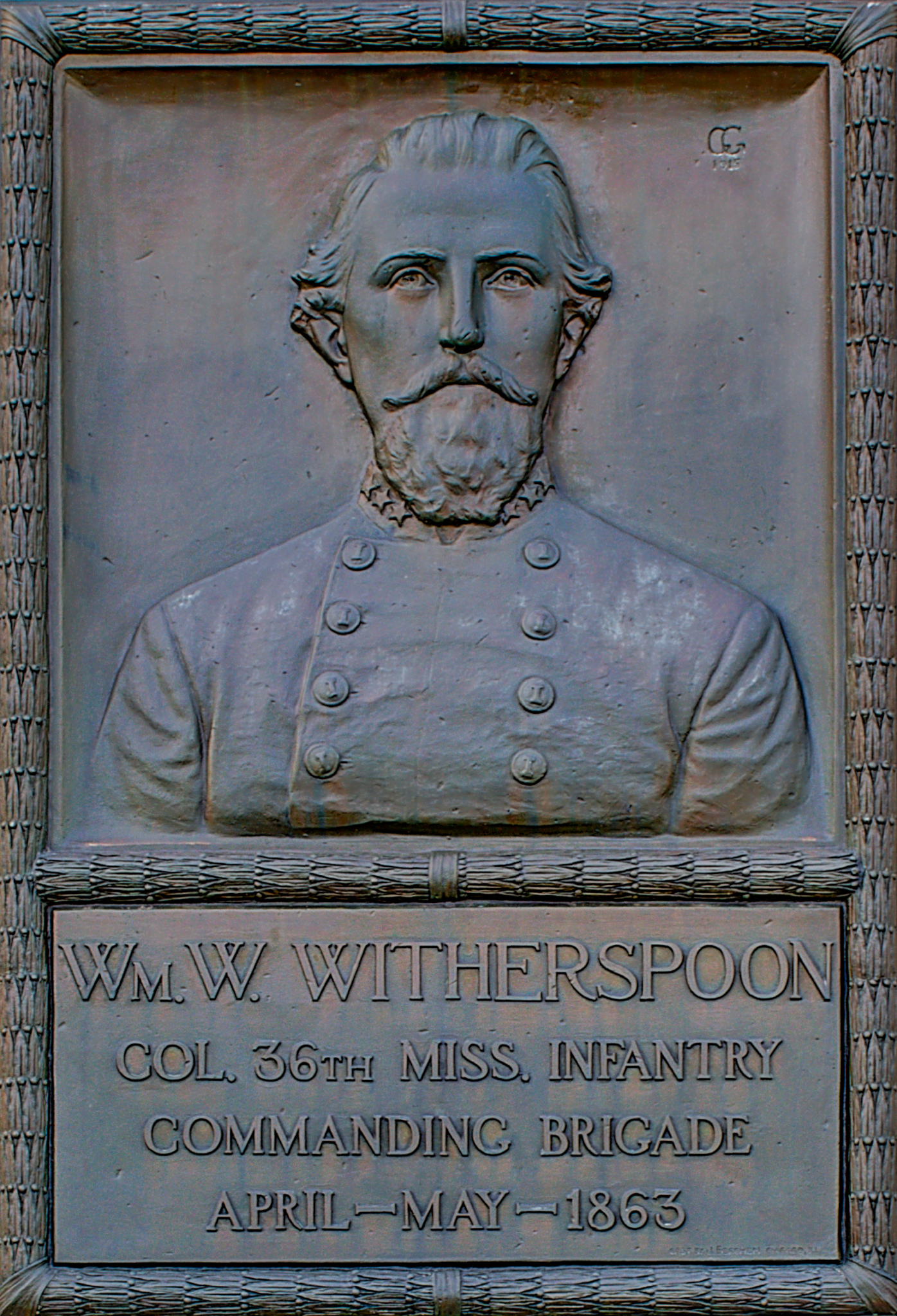
Plaque commemorating Col. William Witherspoon of the 36th Mississippi, at Vicksburg National Military Park.

The companies of the 36th Infantry Regiment were organized in May 1862, with an original strength of 602 men. The 36th first saw action during the Siege of Corinth, fighting at Farmington on May 9, where the Regiment earned praise from General James Patton Anderson, who wrote: "A large portion of the Thirty-sixth Mississippi regiment, although never having formed a line of battle or heard a hostile gun before, behaved with that gallantry and spirit which characterized the troops of that chivalrous State on every field."

In September, the 36th fought at the Battle of Iuka, the conduct of the commanding officers of the regiment was praised in an after-action report by brigade commander Colonel John Donelson Martin. During the Second Battle of Corinth, the Regiment took several casualties while charging the Union-held defensive works around the town.

In early 1863 the regiment was sent to the trenches around Vicksburg to take part in the defense of the city. The 36th took numerous casualties during Union assaults on the defenses. On July 4, the defenders of Vicksburg surrendered, and the 36th Regiment was taken prisoner along with the rest of the Confederate garrison. The 36th Mississippi suffered 28 killed and 72 wounded during the siege. Col. William Witherspoon of the 36th was acting brigade commander for most of the siege, and afterwards he was recommended for promotion to brigadier general by his fellow officers, but he never received a promotion.

The regiment was exchanged, reorganized, and assigned to the brigade of General Claudius W. Sears before being sent to Georgia in the spring of 1864. During the Atlanta campaign, the 36th fought at New Hope Church, Kennesaw Mountain, Atlanta, and Lovejoy's Station. After the Confederate defeat at Atlanta, the 36th Regiment joined General John Bell Hood's Franklin–Nashville campaign, fighting at Allatoona, Franklin, and Nashville. The 36th took many casualties during the desperate charge against the Federal defenses at Franklin, including Col. Witherspoon, who was killed. After the defeat of Hood's Tennessee campaign, the 36th retreated to North Mississippi.

In the spring of 1865, the 36th was sent to Alabama, where it fought at the Battle of Spanish Fort before being captured following the Confederate defeat at the Battle of Fort Blakeley. The remaining Confederate forces in the Western theater surrendered shortly afterwards.

== Commanders ==
Commanders of the 36th Mississippi Infantry:

- Col. Drury J. Brown
- Col. William W. Witherspoon, killed at Franklin, 1864.
- Lt. Col. S.G Harper
- Lt. Col. Edward Brown

== Organization ==
Companies of the 36th Mississippi Infantry:

- Company A, "Mount Zion Guards" of Copiah County.
- Company B, "Zollicoffer Avengers" of Crystal Springs.
- Company C, "Harper Reserves" of Newton, Lauderdale, and Smith counties.
- Company D, "Yankee Hunters" of Union.
- Company E, "Hazlehurst Fencibles"
- Company F, "Hillsboro Rebels" of Scott County.
- Company G, "Copiah Rebels" of Copiah County.
- Company H, "Edwards Tigers" of Meridian.
- Company I, "Stephens Guards" of Newton County.
- Company K, "Dixie Guards" of Copiah County.

== See also ==
- List of Mississippi Civil War Confederate units
