= 14th Independent Battery Indiana Light Artillery =

- Active: March 24, 1862 – September 1, 1865
- Country: United States
- Allegiance: Union
- Branch: Artillery
- Engagements: Siege of Corinth; Battle of Brice's Crossroads; Battle of Nashville; Battle of Spanish Fort; Battle of Fort Blakeley

14th Indiana Battery Light Artillery was an artillery battery that served in the Union Army during the American Civil War.

== Service ==
The battery was organized at Indianapolis, Indiana, and mustered in March 24, 1862, for a three years service.

The battery was attached to 1st Division, Army of the Tennessee, to July 1862. Artillery, 1st Division, District of Jackson, Tennessee, to November 1862. Artillery, District of Jackson, Tennessee, XIII Corps, Department of the Tennessee, to December 1862. Artillery, District of Jackson, XVI Corps, to March 1863. Artillery, 3rd Division, XVI Corps, to June 1863. District of Corinth, Mississippi, 2nd Division, XVI Corps, to November 1863. Post of Corinth, 2nd Division, XVI Corps, to January 1864. Artillery, 3rd Division, XVI Corps, to June 1864. Unattached Artillery, District of West Tennessee, to December 1864. Artillery, 3rd Division Detachment, Army of the Tennessee, Department of the Cumberland, to February 1865. Artillery, 3rd Division, XVI Corps, Military Division West Mississippi, to March 1865. Artillery Brigade, XVI Corps, Military Division West Mississippi, to August 1865.

The 14th Indiana Battery Light Artillery mustered out September 1, 1865 in Indianapolis.

== Detailed service ==
Advance on and siege of Corinth, Mississippi, April 29-May 30, 1862. Moved to Jackson, Tennessee, and duty there until June 1863. Action at Lexington, Tennessee, December 18, 1862. (Detachment captured.) Parker's Cross Roads, near Jackson, December 30. Red Mound (or Parker's Cross Roads) December 31, 1862. Duty at LaGrange, Tennessee, June to October 1863. Moved to Pocahontas October 11, and duty there until November 23. Moved to Corinth, Mississippi, November 23, and duty there until January 25, 1864. Ordered to Memphis, Tennessee, then to Vicksburg, Mississippi. Meridian Campaign February 3-March 2, 1864. Queen Hill February 4. Return to Memphis, Tennessee, March, and duty there until November 16. Veterans on furlough May and June. Sturgis' Expedition from Memphis to Guntown, Mississippi, June 1–13 (non-veterans). Battle of Brice's Cross Roads, near Guntown, June 10. (Guns captured.) Smith's Expedition to Tupelo, Mississippi, July 5–21. Harrisburg, near Tupelo, July 14–15. Smith's Expedition to Oxford, Mississippi, August 1–30. Duty at Memphis, Tennessee, until November 16. Moved to Nashville, Tennessee, November 16-December 1. Battle of Nashville December 15–16. Pursuit of Hood to the Tennessee River December 17–28. At Eastport, Mississippi, until February 7, 1865. Moved to New Orleans, Louisiana, February 7–22. Campaign against Mobile, Alabama, and its defenses March 17-April 12. Siege of Spanish Fort and Fort Blakely March 26-April 8. Fort Blakely April 9. Occupation of Mobile April 12. March to Montgomery April 13–25. Duty there until August. Ordered to Indianapolis, August 15.

== Casualties ==
The battery lost a total of 28 men during service; 4 enlisted men killed or mortally wounded, 1 officer and 23 enlisted men died of disease.

== Commanders ==
- Captain Francis W. Morse

== See also ==
- List of Indiana Civil War regiments
- Indiana in the Civil War
