= 119th Illinois Infantry Regiment =

119th Regiment Illinois Volunteer Infantry
- Active: September 1862 - August 26, 1865
- Country: United States
- Allegiance: Union
- Branch: Infantry
- Engagements: Meridian Campaign; Red River Campaign; Battle of Pleasant Hill; Battle of Tupelo; Battle of Nashville; Battle of Westport; Battle of Fort Blakeley

The 119th Regiment, Illinois Volunteer Infantry was an infantry regiment in the Union Army during the American Civil War.

== Service ==
The 119th Illinois Infantry was organized in Quincy, Illinois beginning in September 1862 and mustered in for three years' service on October 7, 1862, under the command of Colonel Thomas Jefferson Kinney.

The regiment was attached to District of Jackson, Tennessee, XIII Corps, Department of the Tennessee, to December 1862. District of Columbus, Kentucky, XVI Corps, to January 1863. 3rd Brigade, District of Jackson, XVI Corps, to March 1863. 4th Brigade, 1st Division, XVI Corps, to May 1863. 4th Brigade, District of Memphis, Tennessee, 5th Division, XV Corps, to January 1864. 1st Brigade, 3rd Division, XVI Corps, to December 1864. 1st Brigade, 2nd Division, Detachment Army of the Tennessee, Department of the Cumberland, to February 1865. 1st Brigade, 2nd Division, XVI Corps, Military Division West Mississippi, to August 1865.

The 119th Illinois Infantry mustered out of service August 26, 1865.

== Detailed service ==
Ordered to Columbus, Kentucky, then to Jackson, Tennessee, and duty along Mobile & Ohio Railroad until December 1862. Company G captured at Rutherford Station and Company K at Dyer's Station December 21, 1862. Duty at Columbus, Kentucky, and at Union City, Tennessee, until February 1863. Moved to Humboldt, Huntington, and Memphis, Tennessee, and guarding railroad near Memphis until May 30. Moved to Memphis and post duty there until January 1864. Ordered to Vicksburg, Mississippi, January 21, 1864. Meridian Campaign February 3-March 2. Queen Hill February 4. Meridian February 14–15. Red River Campaign March 10 May 22. Fort DeRussy March 14. Occupation of Alexandria, Louisiana, March 16. Battle of Pleasant Hill April 9. Natchitoches April 20–21. About Cloutiersville April 22–24. At Alexandria April 26-May 13. Bayou La Mourie May 7. Retreat to Morganza May 13–20. Mansura May 16. Yellow Bayou May 18. Moved to Vicksburg, Mississippi, then to Memphis, Tennessee, May 21-June 10. Lake Chicot, Arkansas, June 6. Defeat of Marmaduke. Smith's Expedition to Tupelo, Mississippi, July 5–21. Camargo's Cross Roads, near Harrisburg, July 13. Harrisburg, near Tupelo, July 14–15. Old Town (or Tishamingo) Creek July 15. Smith's Expedition to Oxford, Miss., August 1–30. Tallahatchie River August 7–9. Abbeville August 23. Mower's Expedition to Brownsville, Ark., September 2–10. Marched through Arkansas and Missouri in pursuit of Price September 17-November 19. Moved to Nashville, Tennessee, November 21-December 1. Battle of Nashville December 15–16. Pursuit of Hood to the Tennessee River December 17–28. Moved to Eastport, Mississippi, and duty there until February 1865. Movement to New Orleans, Louisiana, February 8–26. To Dauphin Island March 6. Campaign against Mobile and its defenses March 17-April 12. Siege of Spanish Fort and Fort Blakely March 26-April 8. Assault and capture of Fort Blakely April 9. Occupation of Mobile April 12. Marched to Montgomery April 13–25. Returned to Mobile and duty there until August.

== Casualties ==
The regiment lost a total of 157 men during service; 2 officers and 22 enlisted men killed or mortally wounded, 3 officers and 130 enlisted men died of disease.

== Commanders ==
- Colonel Thomas Jefferson Kinney - promoted to brevet brigadier general, March 26, 1865

== Notable members ==
- Sergeant John H. Cook, Company A - Medal of Honor recipient for action at the Battle of Pleasant Hill
- Captain Samuel McConnell, Company. H - Medal of Honor recipient for action at the Battle of Fort Blakeley, Alabama
- Sergeant George F. Rebman, Company B (Medal of Honor) recipient for gallantry in action in capture of the Confederate flag at Battle at Fort Blakely, Alabama

== See also ==
- List of Illinois Civil War units
- Illinois in the Civil War
