= 24th Indiana Infantry Regiment =

24th Regiment Indiana Volunteer Infantry
- Flag of the United States, 1863-1865
- Active: July 31, 1861, to November 15, 1865
- Country: United States
- Allegiance: Union
- Branch: Infantry
- Engagements: Battle of Shiloh; Siege of Corinth; Battle of Port Gibson; Battle of Champion Hill; Siege of Vicksburg; Battle of Fort Blakeley

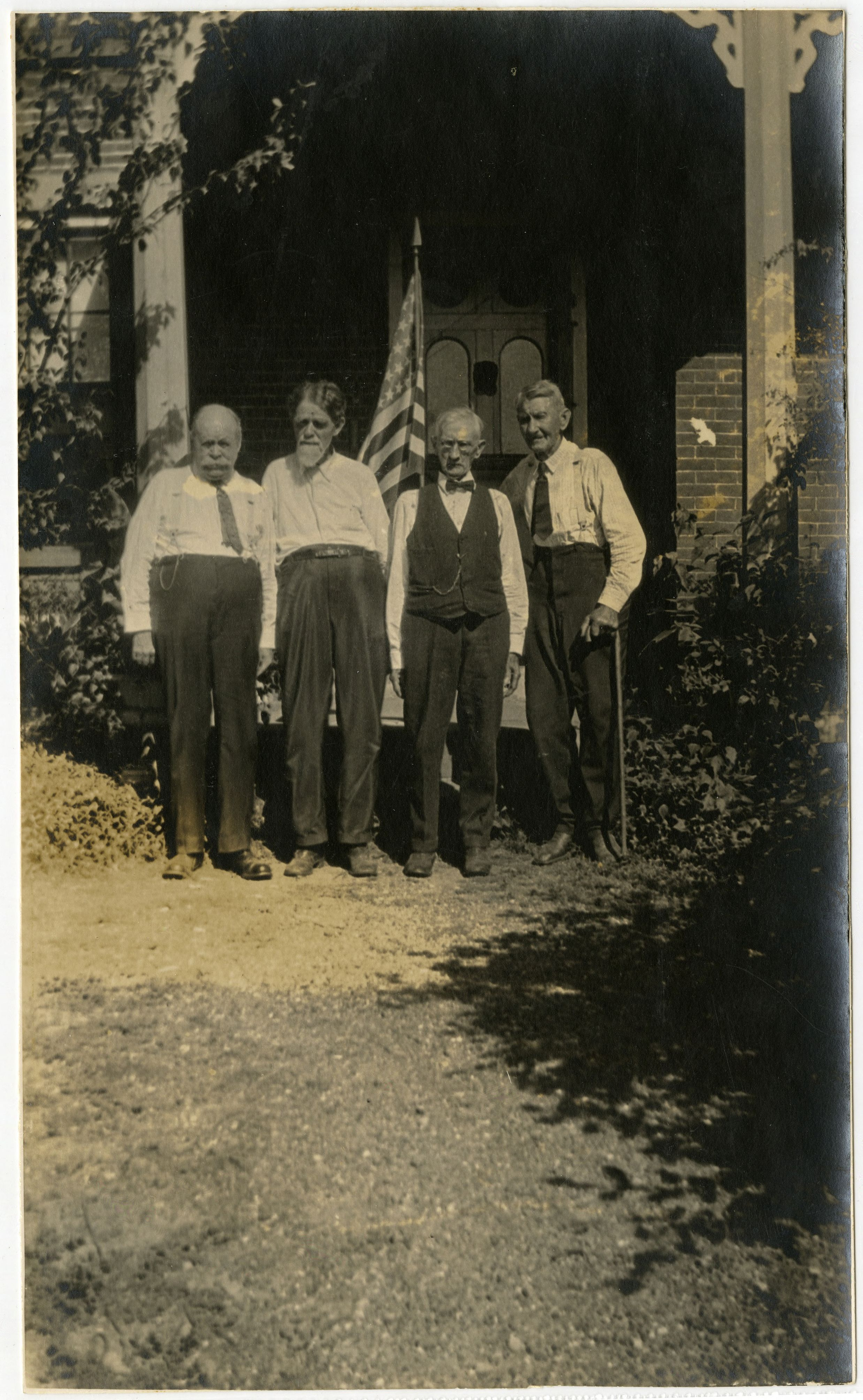
Living members of Co. F, 24th Indiana Regiment (1926)

The 24th Regiment, Indiana Volunteer Infantry was an infantry regiment that served in the Union Army during the American Civil War.

== Service ==
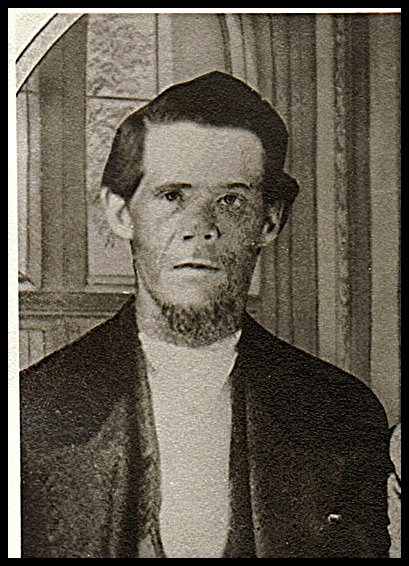
Alfred Agan, veteran of the 24th Indiana Infantry, after the war in Orange County, Indiana.

The 24th Regiment, Indiana Volunteer Infantry, was organized for 3 years' service at Vincennes, Indiana, on September 13, 1861.

- Battle of Shiloh
- Siege of Corinth
- Battle of Port Gibson
- Battle of Champion Hill
- Siege of Vicksburg
- Battle of Fort Blakeley

The 24th Indiana on January 1, 1864, re-enlisted as a veteran organization. On December 10, 1864, it was consolidated with the 67th Regiment, Indiana Volunteer Infantry, the new organization retaining the designation of the 24th Indiana. The regiment mustered out of service on November 15, 1865.

== Total strength and casualties ==
The regiment suffered 8 officers and 80 enlisted men killed in action or died of wounds and 3 officers and 204 enlisted men who died of disease, for a total of 295 fatalities.

== Commanders ==
- Colonel Alvin Peterson Hovey - promoted to brigadier general, April 28, 1862
- Colonel William Thomas Spicely - mustered out July 21, 1865, expiration of term of service

== See also ==
- List of Indiana Civil War regiments
- Indiana in the Civil War
