= Bryan M. Thomas =

Confederate States Army office during the American Civil War

Bryan Morel Thomas
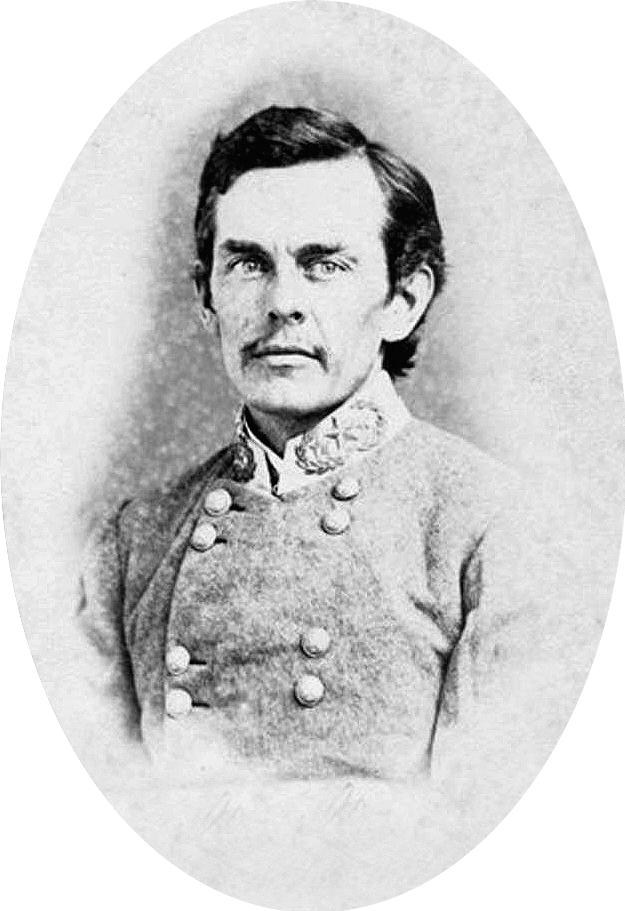
- Brig. Gen. Bryan Morel Thomas, CSA photo taken in 1864 or 1865
- Born: May 8, 1836; Milledgeville, Georgia, US
- Died: July 16, 1905 (aged 69); Dalton, Georgia, US
- Burial place: West Hill Cemetery, Dalton
- Military career
- Allegiance: United States; Confederate States of America
- Branch: US Army; Confederate States Army
- Service years: 1858–1861 (USA); 1861–1865 (CSA)
- Rank: Second Lieutenant (USA); Colonel (CSA); Brigadier General (CSA) (unconfirmed)
- Units: 8th U.S. Infantry; 5th U.S. Infantry; 18th Alabama Infantry
- Commands: Artillery, Reserve Corps, AoM; 12th Mississippi Cavalry; Thomas's Brigade
- Conflicts: American Civil War: Battle of Shiloh; Kentucky Campaign; Battle of Stone's River; Battle of Fort Blakeley
- Other work: farmer, Deputy U.S. Marshal, academy headmaster, school superintendent

Bryan Morel Thomas (May 8, 1836 – July 16, 1905) was an American soldier, farmer, marshal, and educator. He served as an officer in the United States Army, and later in the Confederate States Army during the American Civil War. He was a son-in-law of Jones M. Withers, under whom Thomas would serve in the war. Thomas also participated in and was captured during the 1865 Battle of Fort Blakeley, the conflict's final infantry fight.

== Early life and U.S. Army career ==
Thomas was born in 1836 in Milledgeville, Georgia, and gained his primary education while attending Atlanta's Oglethorpe University. On July 1, 1854, he entered the United States Military Academy at West Point. Thomas graduated four years later and stood 22nd out of 54 cadets. On July 1, 1858, he was brevetted as a second lieutenant and assigned to the 8th U.S. Infantry.

With the 8th Infantry, Thomas performed garrison duty in New York and then was stationed in the Utah Territory. On January 19, 1859, he was promoted to second lieutenant and assigned to the 5th U.S. Infantry. With the 5th Infantry he was stationed at Fort Union in the New Mexico Territory until resigning in 1861.

== American Civil War service ==
Following Georgia's secession, Thomas resigned his commission in the U.S. Army effective April 6, 1861. He was commissioned as a first lieutenant in the regular Confederate infantry on March 16, and promoted to major in the regular service that same day. In July Thomas was assigned to the 18th Alabama Infantry with the rank of major. Leaving the line service for staff work, Thomas was assigned to command the ordnance in the Confederate Department of Alabama & West Florida on December 20.

In 1862 Thomas was sent to serve in the Western Theater, and was given command of the artillery belonging to a brigade in the Army of Mississippi as of March 18. Eight days later Thomas was appointed assistant inspector general of the brigade, a post he held until that summer. Assigned to the staff of Maj. Gen. Jones M. Withers, Thomas fought at the Battle of Shiloh on April 6–7, performing a "commendable part in the battle..." In July he was assigned command of the army's Reserve Corps artillery, a position Thomas would hold for the rest of the year. He also participated in the Kentucky Campaign that autumn, and then took a brief sick leave. Thomas returned to duty in time to fight during the Battle of Stone's River in late 1862.

Beginning on January 2, 1863, Thomas was assigned as assistant inspector general of the Withers' Division in the renamed Army of Tennessee. Later in 1863, on the recommendation of Lt. Gen. Leonidas Polk, he was promoted to colonel and given command of the 12th Mississippi Cavalry. This new regiment, the reserve cavalry of Brig. Gen. James H. Clanton's Alabama Brigade, was also variously known as "Col. Thomas's Alabama Cavalry." On August 4, 1864, he was appointed as a "temporary" brigadier general of volunteer troops and that September was assigned brigade command in the defenses in Mobile, Alabama. His appointment was never confirmed by the Confederate Congress so his actual highest grade was colonel.

=== Fort Blakeley ===
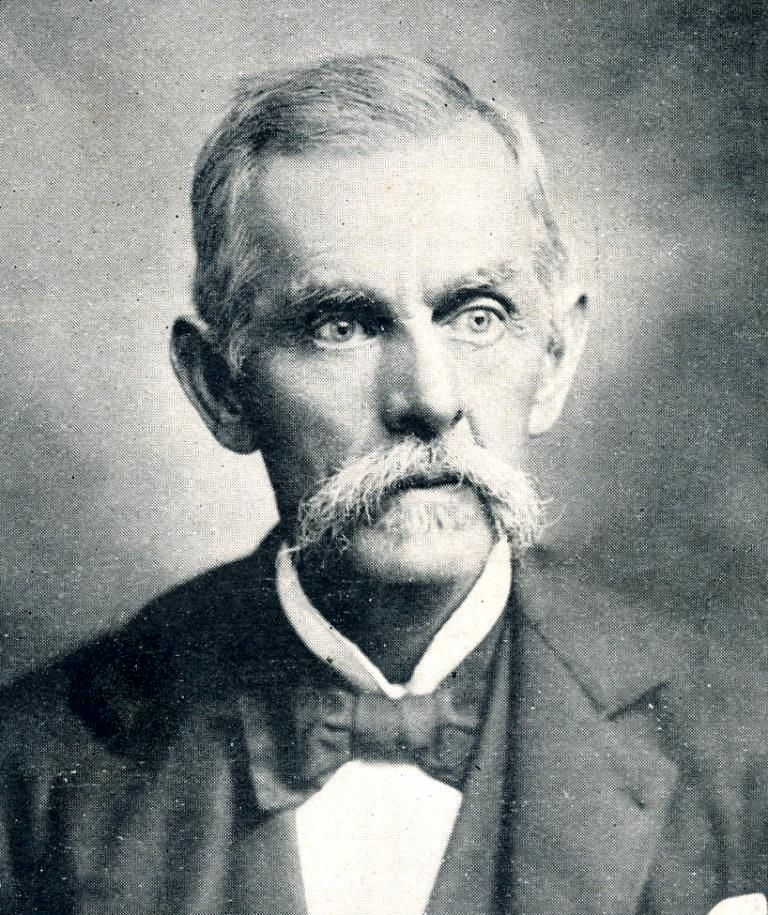
Bryan Thomas in later life

In 1865 Thomas participated in the Mobile Campaign as part of the Confederate force holding Fort Blakeley in Baldwin County, Alabama. Beginning on April 1 Thomas and the fort was put under siege by the Union forces of Maj. Gen. Edward R. S. Canby. His command—mostly consisting of "boy reserves"—held the right of the Confederate works, on the left was the division of Brig. Gen. Francis Cockrell, and both under Brig. Gen. St. John Richardson Liddell, the garrison commander. At 5:30 p.m. on April 9 the attack came, with simple numbers (around 16,000 Union versus 4,475 Confederate) deciding the assault, which lasted only 20 minutes. In the fight, 3,700 Confederates, Thomas, Cockrell, as well as Liddell were all captured. Thomas was held until June when he was released from Fort Gaines, Alabama, paroled and returned home.

== Postbellum career ==
After the American Civil War, Thomas worked as a farmer in Dooly County and then Whitfield County, Georgia. He then worked as a deputy U.S. Marshal, and in 1884 he founded a private academy. Finally settling in Dalton, Thomas served as superintendent of the city's schools from 1891 to 1900. He died in Dalton in 1905 and was buried in the city's West Hill Cemetery.

The Bryan M. Thomas Chapter of the United Daughters of the Confederacy was named in his honor.

== Personal ==
In 1865, Thomas married Mary Jones Withers, the daughter of Maj. Gen. Jones M. Withers, his first commander. Together they had a daughter named Harriet. Thomas was a member of Rocky Mountain Lodge No. 205 (Missouri Registry) in Utah Territory 1858-1869

== See also ==
- List of American Civil War generals (Acting Confederate)
