= John H. Cook =

- Born: July 19, 1840; London, England
- Died: July 22, 1916 (aged 76); New York City
- Burial place: Woodlawn Cemetery, New York
- Military career
- Allegiance: United States of America
- Branch: United States Army; Union Army
- Service years: 1862 - 1865
- Rank: Sergeant
- Unit: 119th Regiment Illinois Volunteer Infantry - Company A
- Awards: Medal of Honor

John Henry Cook (July 19, 1840 to July 22, 1916) was an English soldier who fought in the American Civil War. Cook received the United States' highest award for bravery during combat, the Medal of Honor, for his action at Pleasant Hill in Louisiana on 9 April 1864. He was honored with the award on 19 September 1890.

== Biography ==
Cook was born in London on 19 July 1840. He enlisted with the 119th Illinois Infantry from Quincy, Illinois in August 1862, and mustered out with his regiment in June 1865. He died on 22 July 1916, and his remains are interred at Woodlawn Cemetery in New York.

== Medal of Honor citation ==
During an attack by the enemy, voluntarily left the brigade quartermaster, with whom he had been detailed as a clerk, rejoined his command, and, acting as first lieutenant, led the line farther toward the charging enemy.

== See also ==
- List of American Civil War Medal of Honor recipients: A–F
