= 7th Mississippi Infantry Battalion =

7th Battalion Mississippi Infantry
- Active: 1862 – 1865
- Country: Confederate States
- Allegiance: Mississippi
- Branch: Army
- Type: Infantry
- Size: Battalion
- Engagements: American Civil War: Second Battle of Corinth; Siege of Vicksburg; Atlanta campaign

The 7th Battalion Mississippi Infantry was a unit in the Confederate States Army during the American Civil War, formed of volunteers from southern Mississippi. The Battalion was organized at Quitman, Mississippi, in May 1862.

== History ==
In September 1862 the 7th Battalion was mobilized and under General Martin E. Green took part in the Battle of Iuka.

The 7th Battalion participated in the Second Battle of Corinth and the Siege of Vicksburg, where it was captured along with the rest of the Confederate garrison. After being reorganized at Enterprise, Mississippi, and placed under the command of General Claudius W. Sears, the battalion took part in the Atlanta campaign and Hood’s Tennessee campaign. The remnants of the 7th Battalion were ordered to Mobile, Alabama in February, 1865, and surrendered on April 8th, 1865 after the Battle of Spanish Fort.

Casualties reported by the 7th Battalion include 65 at Corinth, 50 at Vicksburg, 72 at Kennesaw Mountain, and 9 at the Chattahoochee River.

== Commanders ==
Officers of the 7th Battalion, Mississippi Infantry:

- Lt. Col James S. Terral (killed in action at Corinth, October 1862)
- Lt. Col. L. B. Pardue (killed in action June 1864)
- Maj. Joel E. Welborn (resigned commission 1863)

== Notable members ==
- Newton Knight, Company F, deserted October 1862, after the Battle of Corinth. Many members of Knight’s anti-Confederate guerilla force were deserters from the 7th Battalion

== Organization ==
Companies of the 7th Battalion, Mississippi Infantry:

- Company A, from Jasper County
- Company B, from Jones County and Perry County
- Company C, from Jones County
- Company D, from Clarke County
- Company E, from Clarke County
- Company F, from Jones and Perry counties
- Company G, from Covington County

== See also ==
- List of Mississippi Civil War Confederate units
