= Lewis Thompson Woodruff =

Lewis T. Woodruff
- Born: March 5, 1816; Hartford, Connecticut, U.S.
- Died: May 25, 1869 (aged 53); Mobile, Alabama, U.S.
- Military career
- Allegiance: Confederate States of America
- Branch: Confederate States Army
- Service years: 1861–1864
- Rank: Colonel
- Commands: 36th Alabama Infantry Regiment
- Conflicts: American Civil War; Battle of Chickamauga; Battle of Lookout Mountain; Battle of Missionary Ridge; Battle of Rocky Face Ridge; Battle of Resaca; Battle of New Hope Church (WIA)

Lewis Thompson Woodruff (March 5, 1816 – May 25, 1869) was an officer in the Confederate States Army during the American Civil War.

== Biography ==
He was born in Hartford, Connecticut, but moved to Mobile, Alabama, in 1839. He entered Alabama state service on April 24, 1861, as captain of the "Mobile Rifles", which was designated Company K, 3rd Alabama Infantry. Woodruff was so well thought of that an offshoot of his company took his name, and the "Woodruff Rifles" fought in the 21st Alabama Infantry. The 3rd Alabama was organized at Montgomery, Alabama, and was the first Alabama regiment to make the trek to the seat of war in Virginia, where it mustered into Confederate service at Lynchburg on May 4.

Woodruff served as a captain in the 3rd Alabama for a year. The 3rd was brigaded with the 1st and 12th Virginia at Norfolk, on the Peninsula, first under Colonel Jones M. Withers and then under Colonel William Mahone. On May 12, 1862, Woodruff was elected lieutenant colonel of the newly formed 36th Alabama Infantry. The 36th was organized at Mount Vernon Arsenal in Mount Vernon, Alabama, on May 12, 1862. It remained there a month, then aided in the construction of the defenses at Oven Bluff shipyard on the Tombigbee River and at Choctaw Point and was then stationed in Mobile. On March 14, 1863, Woodruff was promoted to full colonel of the 36th.

The following month, April 1863, Woodruff and his regiment were sent to the winter camps at Tullahoma, Tennessee. There it was placed in a brigade with the 18th, 32nd, 38th, and 58th Alabama regiments under Brigadier General Henry Clayton, in Alexander Stewart's division.

When General Braxton Bragg was maneuvered out of middle Tennessee during the Tullahoma Campaign, the 36th fell back with the army. Their first major engagement in which Woodruff commanded the regiment was the Battle of Chickamauga. In an after action report, Woodruff reported that his regiment went in at 1:30 and fought till out of ammunition, then they were withdrawn to resupply. After resupplying they went back into action.

The 36th was awarded credit for capturing the battery and the crossed cannon honors were placed on their flag. Loses for the regiment were light at the Battle of Lookout Mountain on November 24, 1863, but they suffered severely at the Battle of Missionary Ridge the following day. Thus began a series of reverses that did not stop until the army went into winter quarters in and around Dalton, Georgia.

After a cold, hungry winter the colonel led his men into battle in Georgia at Rocky Face Ridge, Resaca and finally at New Hope Church. At New Hope Church "Colonel L. T. Woodruff was seriously wounded on the 25th of May, at 4 o'clock, the ball entering his thigh near the leading artery. He was carried from the field, believed to be mortally wounded." He survived and was recommended for promotion to brigadier general, but his leg was so badly damaged that he could not walk fifty yards even with crutches, so the medical board recommended his retirement. On December 13, 1864, he retired from the Confederate Army and made his way back to Mobile in early 1865.

On May 25, 1869, "forgetting his own safety he rushed into a burning building to save the property of a fellow citizen" and his skull was crushed by the falling of a wall. He received a tribute in the May 27, Mobile Register.
