= Battle of Mobile =

Several historical battles were fought near the town of Mobile, Alabama:

- In 1780, the Spanish captured British West Floria (now Mobile, Alabama) at the Battle of Fort Charlotte.
- In 1781, the Spanish defeated a British and Waldecker counterattack at the Battle of Mobile (1781).
- In 1813, American forces captured the city of Mobile during the Capture of Mobile.
- In 1864, a Union fleet defeated a Confederate fleet at the Battle of Mobile Bay.
- In 1865, the Mobile Campaign (1865) consisted of the Battle of Spanish Fort and the Battle of Fort Blakely.
