= Jones M. Withers =

American politician (1814–1890)

Jones Mitchell Withers
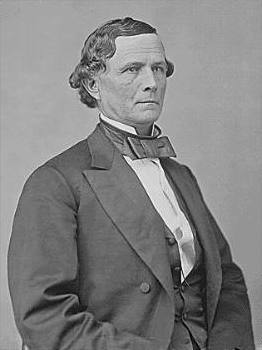
- Jones Mitchell Withers
- Born: January 12, 1814; Madison County, Alabama
- Died: March 13, 1890 (aged 76); Mobile, Alabama
- Burial place: Magnolia Cemetery, Mobile, Alabama
- Relatives: Bryan M. Thomas (son-in-law)
- Military career
- Allegiance: United States of America; Confederate States of America
- Branch: United States Army; Confederate States Army
- Service years: 1835–36, 1847–48 (USA); 1861–65 (CSA)
- Rank: Colonel (USA); Major general (CSA)
- Commands: 9th U.S. Infantry
- Conflicts: Mexican–American War; American Civil War

Jones Mitchell Withers (January 12, 1814 – March 13, 1890) was a United States Army officer who fought during the Mexican–American War and later served as a Confederate major general during the American Civil War. He also was a lawyer, politician, and businessman from the state of Alabama.

== Early life and career ==
Withers was born in 1814 in Huntsville, located in both Madison County and Limestone County, Alabama. He was a son of John Wright Withers, a Virginia planter, and of Mary Herbert Jones. He was of English descent. Withers received his education at Greene Academy in Huntsville. In 1831 he attended the United States Military Academy at West Point, and graduated four years later standing 44th out of 56 cadets. He was appointed a brevet second lieutenant in the 1st U.S. Dragoons on July 1, 1835. He was posted to Fort Leavenworth, Kansas, and resigned his commission the following year on December 5.

After resigning, Withers began a law practice in Alabama. In 1836 he entered the state's militia forces, and he later became a cotton broker. On January 12, 1837, Withers married Rebecca Eloise Forney, and the couple had ten children together. He was admitted to Alabama's bar association in 1838. During the Mexican–American War, Withers was appointed a lieutenant colonel in the U.S. Army on March 3, 1847, and was assigned to the 13th U.S. Infantry. He was promoted to colonel on September 13 in the 9th U.S. Infantry, and resigned on May 23, 1848.

Withers returned to Alabama following the war with Mexico and became a merchant there before entering local politics. He served first in Alabama's State Legislature, then, in 1855, he was elected to the U.S. House of Representatives. From 1858 to 1861, Withers was the mayor of Mobile, Alabama.

== Civil War service ==
During the American Civil War, Withers chose to follow his home state and the Confederate cause, and entered the Confederate States Army in 1861. He was appointed the colonel of the 3rd Alabama Infantry on April 28, and served briefly as commander of the Department of Norfolk that May. Withers was promoted to brigadier general on July 10, and began his Western Theater service in the fall.

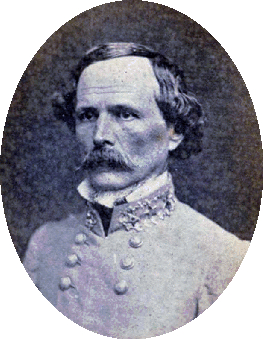
Withers during the Civil War

Withers commanded the District of Alabama from September 12, 1861, to January 27, 1862. His command was re-designated the Army of Mobile on January 27 until February 5, and became the 2nd Division of the II Corps in the Army of Mississippi on March 29. Withers fought during the Battle of Shiloh in Tennessee on April 6, and was promoted to major general from that date. He commanded the reserve corps of the Army of Mississippi from June 30 to August 18, later referred to as "Withers' Division" in the "Right Wing" until November 20.

The Army of Mississippi was renamed the Army of Tennessee on November 20, 1862, and Withers led his 2nd Division with distinction during the Battle of Stones River from December 31 to January 2, 1863. His conduct in the fight was praised by his corps commander, Lt. Gen. Leonidas Polk, as well as by the army's commander, General Braxton Bragg. An account of his performance at Stones River (also called Murfreesboro) follows:

At the battle of Murfreesboro his division was posted west of the river, and was the front center division of the army, its right being the pivot on which the successful wheel of the army was made on December 29. His skill and gallantry in the battle were highly commended by Polk and Bragg. His division had the most dangerous, difficult work of the day to perform, and they fought nobly, but with terrible loss, 2,500 out of 7,700 engaged.

Withers commanded his division until resigning his commission in the Confederate Army on July 13, 1863, but was quickly restored to his rank as a major general a week later and sent to Alabama to guard the railroad between Demopolis and West Point. He was given command of the District of North Alabama in the Department of Alabama, Mississippi, and East Louisiana from February 6 to July 27, 1864. He also commanded the reserve forces of Alabama from April 30 to May 4, 1865. He was paroled at Meridian, Mississippi, on May 11, after the department had been surrendered and the war came to an end.

== Postbellum ==
Withers was pardoned by the U.S. government on December 28, 1865, and returned to civilian life in Alabama. Withers again took up the law, then became a cotton broker and editor of Mobile's Tribune newspaper. Briefly, in 1867, Withers was once again mayor of the city of Mobile, and from 1878 to 1879, he was treasurer of the city. Withers died in 1890, in Mobile, and was buried in the Magnolia Cemetery.

== See also ==
- List of American Civil War generals (Confederate)
