= Expedition after Forrest =

- Part of the American Civil War
Date	December 24, 1863 – December 31, 1863
Location	Tennessee
Result	Forrest escapes

Belligerents
United States (Union)	(Confederate States of America) Confederate States (Confederacy)

Expedition after Forrest was a military movement of the Union Army during the American Civil War.

== Expedition ==
Major General Nathan Bedford Forrest of the Confederate States Army was making raids in west Tennessee, his force giving Union commanders headaches on their supply lines Major General William T. Sherman order his Memphis commanders to catch him on December 24 an expedition began to cut off Forrest's retreat to Mississippi. The Union force set out marching an average of twenty miles a day with many skirmishes with Forrest. Nonetheless, General Forrest still managed to escape across the Tennessee River to end the expedition On December 31, 1863.

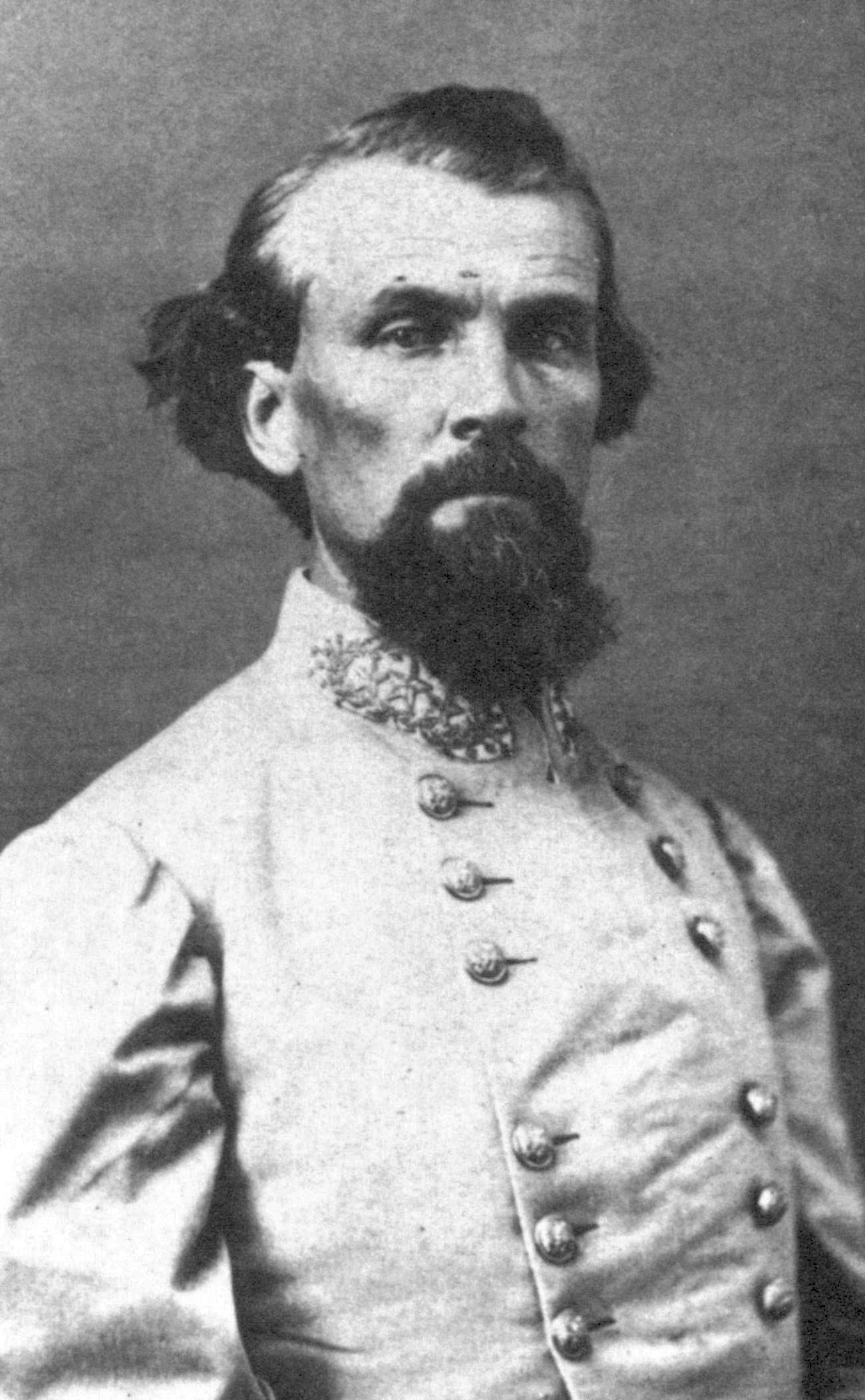
Major General Nathan Bedford Forrest

== Result ==
Major General Forrest escaped capture from the Union forces, carried off one hundred wagons, two hundred beef cattle, three thousand conscripts and innumerable stores, torn up railroad track, cut telegraph wire, and burned and sacked towns.
