= 38th Alabama Infantry Regiment =

Infantry regiment of the Confederate States Army

- Flag of Alabama in 1861 (obverse and reverse)
- Active: May 1862 to May 4, 1865
- Country: Confederate States of America
- Allegiance: CSA
- Branch: Infantry
- Engagements: Battle of Chickamauga; Battle of Resaca; Battle of Atlanta; Battle of Resaca; Battle of Nashville

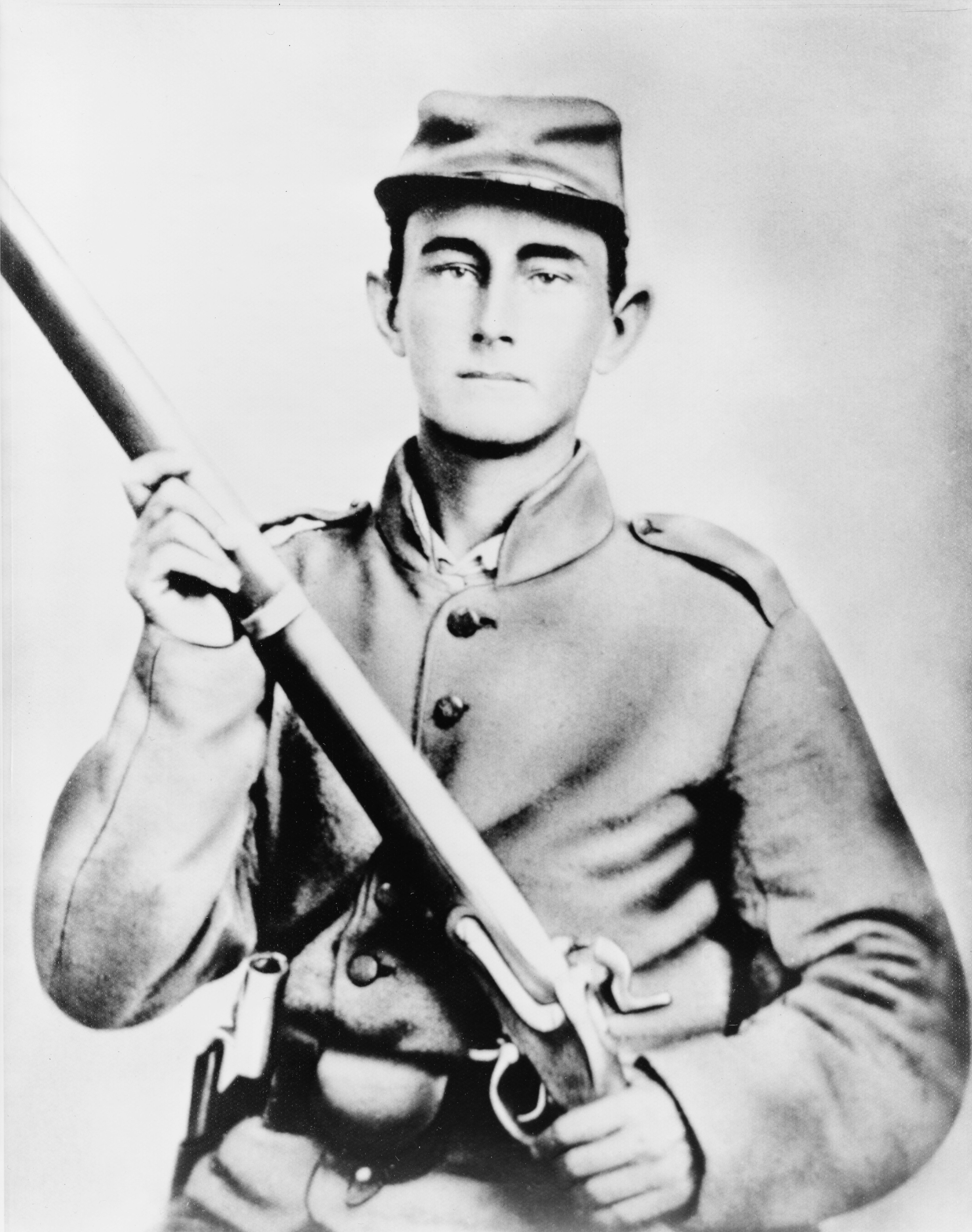
Enoch Hooper Cook Jr., Pvt, Co. H., 38th Alabama Infantry

The 38th Alabama Infantry Regiment was an infantry regiment that served in the Confederate Army during the American Civil War.

== Service ==
The 38th Alabama Infantry Regiment was mustered in at Mobile, Alabama, in May 1862.

The regiment surrendered at Meridian, Mississippi, on May 4, 1865.

== Total strength and casualties ==
The 38th Alabama was at Mobile, Alabama, from the spring of 1862 when it formed until the spring of 1863. They were primarily at Camp Holt on Dauphin Way, a few miles west of downtown, near Monterey and Dauphin Streets. Here they were occupied with learning to be soldiers, drilling and tactics and constructing defensive fortifications around the city of Mobile. The men came from Clarke, Monroe, Wilcox, Choctaw, Fayette, Conecuh, Coosa, Dallas, Baldwin and Mobile counties of Alabama. Most had never been away from home before and many died from disease long before they saw an enemy. There are 1500 men listed in the compiled service records as having enlisted in the 38th Alabama Infantry Volunteers. The regiment was commanded by Colonel Charles T. Ketchum of Mobile.

They were part of General Henry D. Clayton's Brigade and were transferred from Mobile to Tullahoma, Tennessee, in the spring of 1863 and became part of the Confederate Army of Tennessee. The 38th left Mobile with approximately 830 men. The Regiment fought at Chickamauga just south of Chattanooga, Tennessee, on September 19 and 20, 1863, where they experienced heavy losses. In November, they fought at Lookout Mountain, and the next day were overrun at nearby Missionary Ridge where they lost their wagon train, their flag and many officers and men.

The group reformed and wintered with the Army of Tennessee just north of Dalton, Georgia. Spring of '64 brought a northern offensive, and they participated in what is known as the One Hundred-Day Battle as they fought a retreat at places like Dalton, Resaca, New Hope Church and finally Atlanta on July 22, 1864. After the fall of Atlanta the Southern Army, and the 38th along with it, swung north in an effort to attract General William T. Sherman's U. S. Army to follow and to attempt to cut his northern supply lines. After retracing its route to northwest Georgia (U.S. state), the army traversed Alabama as far west as Florence. Major General John Bell Hood advanced his troops on the Federal Forces in Tennessee during November and December 1864 when "the Gallant Hood of Texas played hell in Tennessee." They crossed the Tennessee River at Florence and attacked the enemy at Franklin. Luckily the 38th drew rear guard duty and was spared the awful fate of many southern boys and five Confederate Generals on November 30, 1864, at Franklin. They again saw defeat at Nashville on December 15 and 16, 1864, and Hood withdrew to Tupelo, Mississippi. At this point, Clayton's Brigade and the 38th were reassigned to defend Mobile and were sent to Spanish Fort on the Bay. They saw battle again from March 26 to April 9, 1865, at Spanish Fort. The 38th was among the troops surrendered by Lt. General Richard Taylor, CSA, at Citronelle, Alabama, on May 4, 1865. The troops themselves had been withdrawn to Meridian, Mississippi, and Livingston, Alabama. Of the 830 men of the 38th Alabama who left Mobile in the spring of 1863, there were only 80 left.

== Commanders ==
- Colonel Charles Thomas Ketchum
- Colonel Augustus R. Lankford

== See also ==
- List of Confederate units from Alabama
