= Expedition to Hernando =

- Part of the American Civil War
Date	August 16, 1863 – August 20, 1863
Location	Mississippi
Result	Minor Skirmish

Belligerents
United States (Union)	(Confederate States of America) Confederate States (Confederacy)

The expedition to Hernando was a military movement of the Union Army during the American Civil War.

U.S. flag as of 1862

== The expedition ==
On August 16, 1863, the Union force set out on an expedition to Hernando, Mississippi, from Memphis, Tennessee, with a skirmish with Confederate combatants near Panola, Mississippi, on August 17, 1863. The Union force had returned to Memphis, Tennessee, on August 20, 1863, to end the expedition.

=== Result ===
A minor skirmish
