= Mobile campaign (1865) =

American Civil War campaign

The Mobile campaign was a military campaign of the American Civil War in the western theatre in the Spring of 1865 to take the city of Mobile, Alabama. Opposing forces included the Union Army, and the Confederate Army. Important battles were fought at Spanish Fort and Fort Blakeley.

== Background ==
In 1860, Mobile was the South's fourth-largest city, and home to several shipbuilding companies. The city was a key hub for the cotton trade upon which the South's economy depended, and the gateway to the interior of Alabama. Until 1862 when the Union Army captured New Orleans, Mobile was the second-largest port city of the South. With the fall of New Orleans, Mobile became the most important Confederate port city on the Gulf Coast. Its position at the northern point of Mobile Bay made it a strategic location; if it fell, the Union Army's advance would be unimpeded. Mobile was one of the last significant Gulf Coast cities east of the Mississippi River still held by the Confederacy. In early 1865, General-in-Chief U.S. Grant considered Mobile's capture one of the keys to ending the war.

== Before the Siege ==
The Mobile Campaign was a series of battles fought during the civil war in the Federals' efforts to capture the city of Mobile, Alabama. From March 26 to April 9, 1865, 6,000 outnumbered Confederate soldiers held off 45,000 Union soldiers that were attacking from Fort Blakeley and Spanish fort. The Union troops knew that the capture of Mobile would be one of the key points of ending the Civil War.

Union Major General Gordon Granger's original plan was to attempt to capture Mobile right after the fall of Fort Morgan. To capture the city, Granger wanted to bring his troops up the bay, disembark on Dog River, and march into Mobile. Even though Mobile did have a lot of earthen protection, its number of men that were defending it was very scarce. According to Paul Brueske, author of The Last Siege, "Had the Federals known how few men defended Mobile, they could have then captured the city with minimal losses." However, after the battle of Mobile Bay, Confederate General Maury, fearing an attack from the Federals, asked his superiors for reinforcements. Confederate General St. John R. Liddell was sent to aid Maury. In late 1864, Union Major General Henry W. Halleck sent a letter to General Grant asking for the Armies of the Cumberland to be sent to General Canby to aid him in capturing Mobile. Mobile's value lay as a logistical center with its access to key river and rail communication into the interior. Halleck planned to use Mobile as a base to springboard into the interior of Alabama to attack the Selma and Montgomery corridor, which provided critical supplies such as ammunition and food. Canby was apprehensive in attacking Mobile due to the strong defenses the Confederates had established. The Federals could not attack from the north due to a marsh in that direction. Many large vessels could not get within 12-miles of Mobile because of these geographical features. General Pierre Gustave Toutant Beauregard boasted that Mobile would hold a siege for at least two months.

Major General Dabney H. Maury commanded the small garrison that defended Mobile. Although the Federals stopped blockade running from Mobile Bay at the Battle of Mobile Bay, the Confederates were still apprehensive that the Federals would attack the city of Mobile. In December 1864, Granger initiated a raid on Mobile's western defenses. However, on December 26, Granger and his men had to turn back due to a shortage of supplies and they could not break through the strong defense that the Confederates had put up. This raid encouraged Alabama Governor Thomas H. Watt to issue a draft for more men to fight and to defend Mobile from Federal attacks. Confederate Departmental commander, General Richard Taylor, detached Gibson's and Holtzclaw's brigades along with General French's Division from the Army of Tennessee to defend Mobile. These veteran brigades suffered many casualties at the Battles of Franklin and Nashville.

On January 28, 1865, Lieutenant John T. Walker prepared to attack the Federal flagship Octorara docked in Mobile Bay with his vessel, the semi-submersible Saint Patrick. The torpedo boat attacked the USS Octorara, but the torpedo ship malfunctioned and failed to explode.

== Campaign ==
Major General E.R.S. Canby launched the campaign for Mobile on March 17, 1865. Canby personally led the 13th and 16th Army Corps as they advanced north in Baldwin County, on Mobile Bay's eastern shore. Meanwhile, Major General Frederick Steele led a column from Barrancas, Florida toward Pollard, Alabama, before turning east to besiege Fort Blakeley. Canby's forces arrived in front of Spanish Fort on March 26 and Steele's Column arrived before Fort Blakeley on April 1. Spanish Fort was assaulted on April 8, but most of the garrison escaped. The next evening, Fort Blakeley was assaulted and few of the garrison escaped capture. The Confederates evacuated Mobile on April 10-11. Mobile's Mayor Slough surrendered the city to the Union Navy and Army on April 12, 1865.

== See also ==
- Battle of Nashville
- Mobile campaign Union order of battle
- Mobile campaign Confederate order of battle
- Sherman's March to the Sea
- Wilson's Raid
