= Battle of Spanish Fort =

Battle of the American Civil War

Coordinates: 30°41′3.4″N 87°54′58.95″W

- Part of the American Civil War
| Date | March 27 – April 8, 1865 (1 week and 5 days) |
| Location | Baldwin County, Alabama |
| Result | Union victory |

Belligerents
| United States (Union) | (Confederate States of America) CSA (Confederacy) |

Commanders and leaders
| E.R.S. Canby | Randall L. Gibson |

Units involved
| Army of West Mississippi | Spanish Fort Garrison |

Strength
| 30,000 | 2,000 |

Casualties and losses
| 657 | 744 |

The Battle of Spanish Fort took place from March 27 to April 8, 1865, in Baldwin County, Alabama, as part of the Mobile Campaign of the Western Theater of the American Civil War.

After the Union victory in the Battle of Mobile Bay, Mobile nevertheless remained in Confederate hands. Spanish Fort was heavily fortified as an eastern defense to the city of Mobile. Fort Huger, Fort (Battery) Tracey, Fort (Battery) McDermott, Fort Alexis, Red Fort, and Old Spanish Fort were all part of the Mobile defenses at Spanish Fort.

== Battle ==
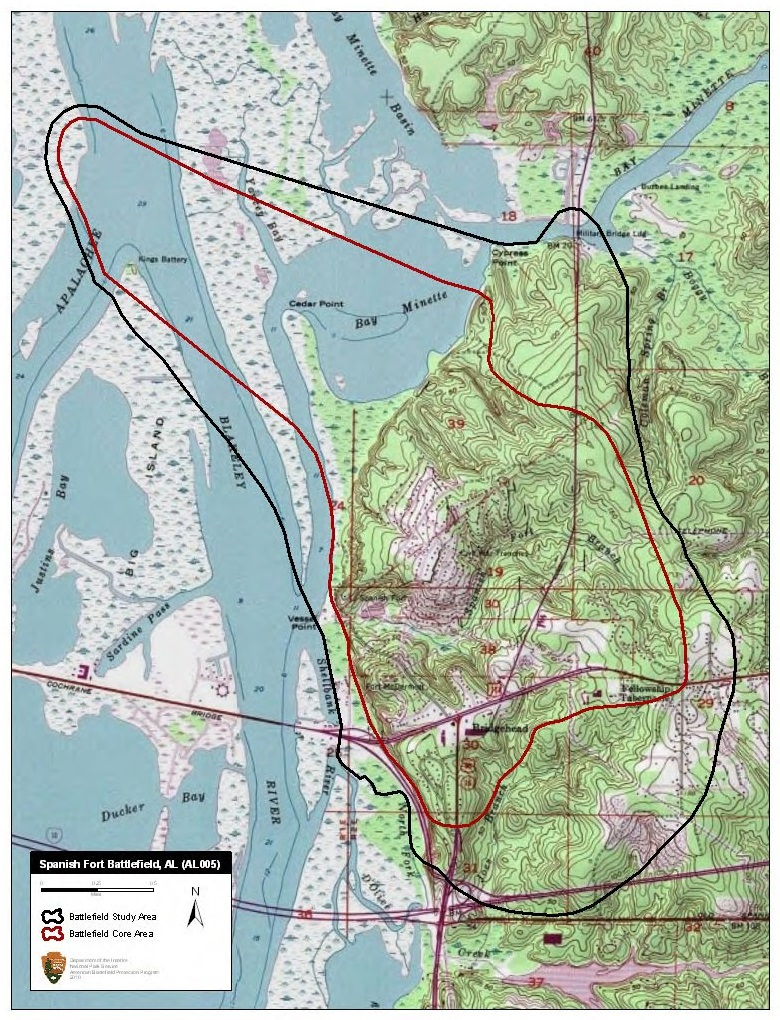
Map of Spanish Fort Battlefield core and study areas by the American Battlefield Protection Program.

Union forces embarked on a land campaign in early 1865 to take Mobile from the east. Maj. Gen. E.R.S. Canby's XIII and XVI corps crossed the Fish River at Marlow Ferry, and moved along the eastern shore of Mobile Bay forcing the Confederates back into their defenses. Union forces then concentrated on Spanish Fort and Fort Blakeley, five miles to the north. On March 27, 1865, Canby's forces rendezvoused at Danley's Ferry and immediately undertook a siege of Spanish Fort. The Union had enveloped the fort by April 1, and on April 8 captured it. Most of the Confederate forces, under the command of Brig. Gen. Randall L. Gibson, escaped and fled to Mobile, but Spanish Fort was no longer a threat.

Fort Blakeley continued to fight after Spanish Fort's fall on April 8. However, as early as April 1, when Spanish Fort's fall became inevitable, Union forces had begun moving north in order to concentrate on Fort Blakeley, which eventually succumbed late on April 9 in the Battle of Fort Blakeley.

The fall of Spanish Fort and Fort Blakeley permitted Union troops to subsequently enter Mobile unopposed after the Army of Mobile evacuated the city, occupying it on April 12, 1865.

== Defense plans ==
Map displaying line of works ordered by Major General Gardner:

- Map of Spanish fort and vicinity, drawn under the direction of Lieutenant Colonel V. Sheliha

== See also ==
- Spanish Fort Union order of battle
