= Battle of Fort Blakeley =

1865 siege during the American Civil War

- Part of the American Civil War
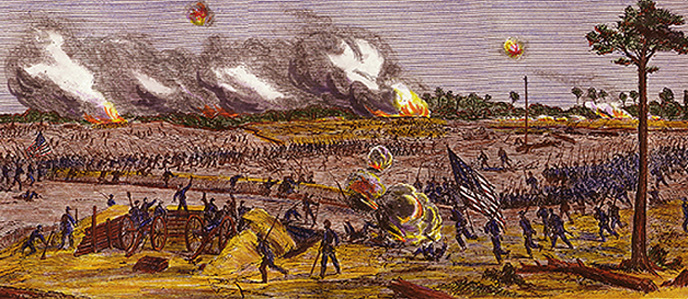
- Storming of Fort Blakeley
Date	April 2–9, 1865
Location	Baldwin County, Alabama 30°44′32.67″N 87°55′37.34″W
Result	Union victory: Fort Blakeley surrendered to the U.S.

Belligerents
United States (Union)	(Confederate States of America) CSA (Confederacy)

Commanders and leaders
Edward Canby; Frederick Steele	St. John R. Liddell

Units involved
Army of West Mississippi, Union ships	Fort Blakeley Garrison, Confederate ships

Strength
16,000	4,000

Casualties and losses
629 on April 9 (150 killed, 650 wounded total)	2,900 (75 killed)

The Battle of Fort Blakeley took place from April 2 to April 9, 1865, in Baldwin County, Alabama, about 6 miles (9.7 km) north of Spanish Fort, Alabama, as part of the Mobile Campaign of the American Civil War. At the time, Blakeley, Alabama, had been the county seat of Baldwin County.

The Battle of Blakeley was the final major battle of the Civil War, with surrender just hours after Grant had accepted the surrender of Lee at Appomattox in the afternoon of April 9, 1865. Mobile, Alabama, was the last major Confederate port to be captured by Union forces, on April 12, 1865. After the assassination of President Lincoln on April 15, 1865, other Confederate surrenders continued into June 1865.

== Background ==
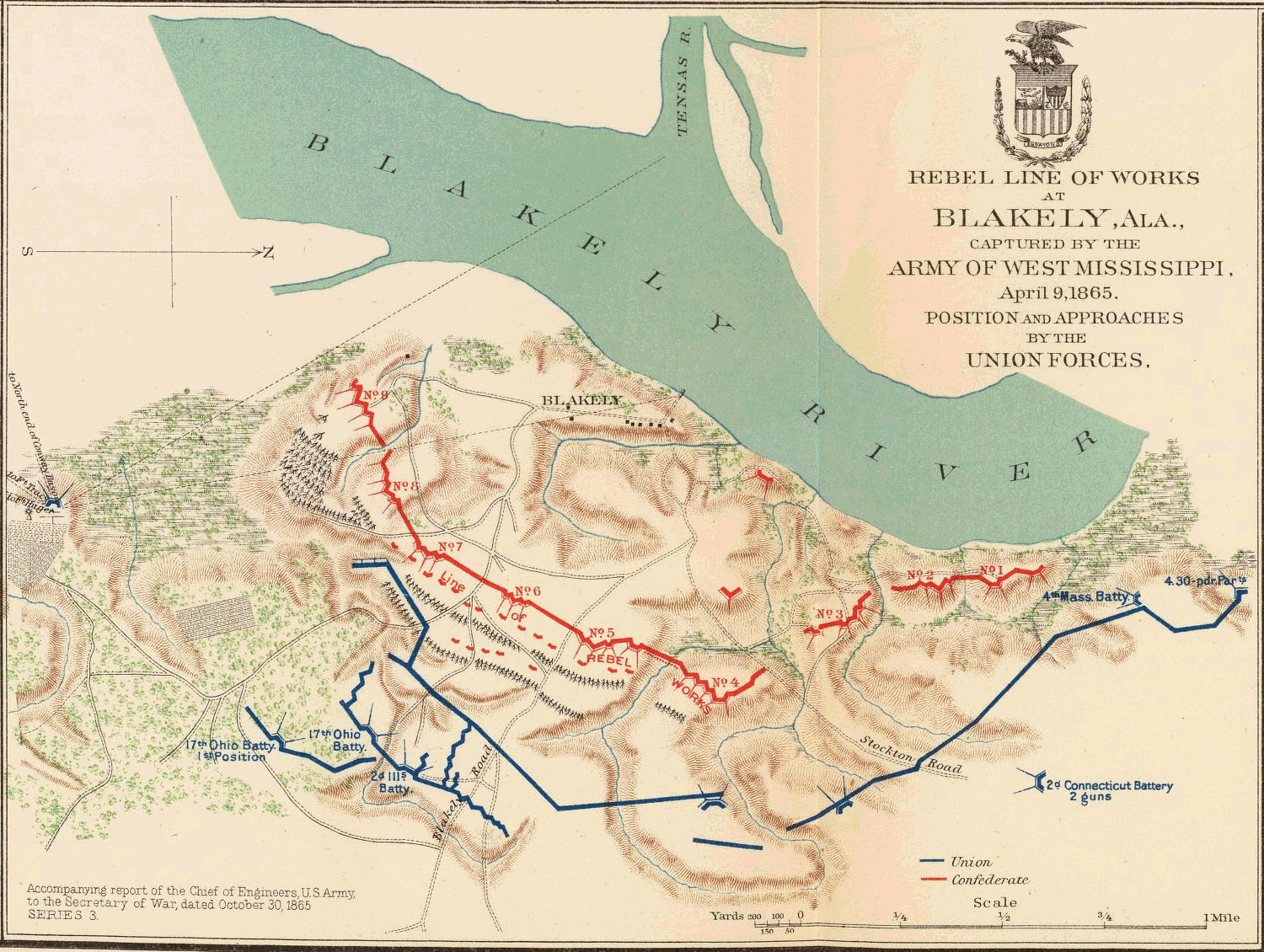
Positions of units involved

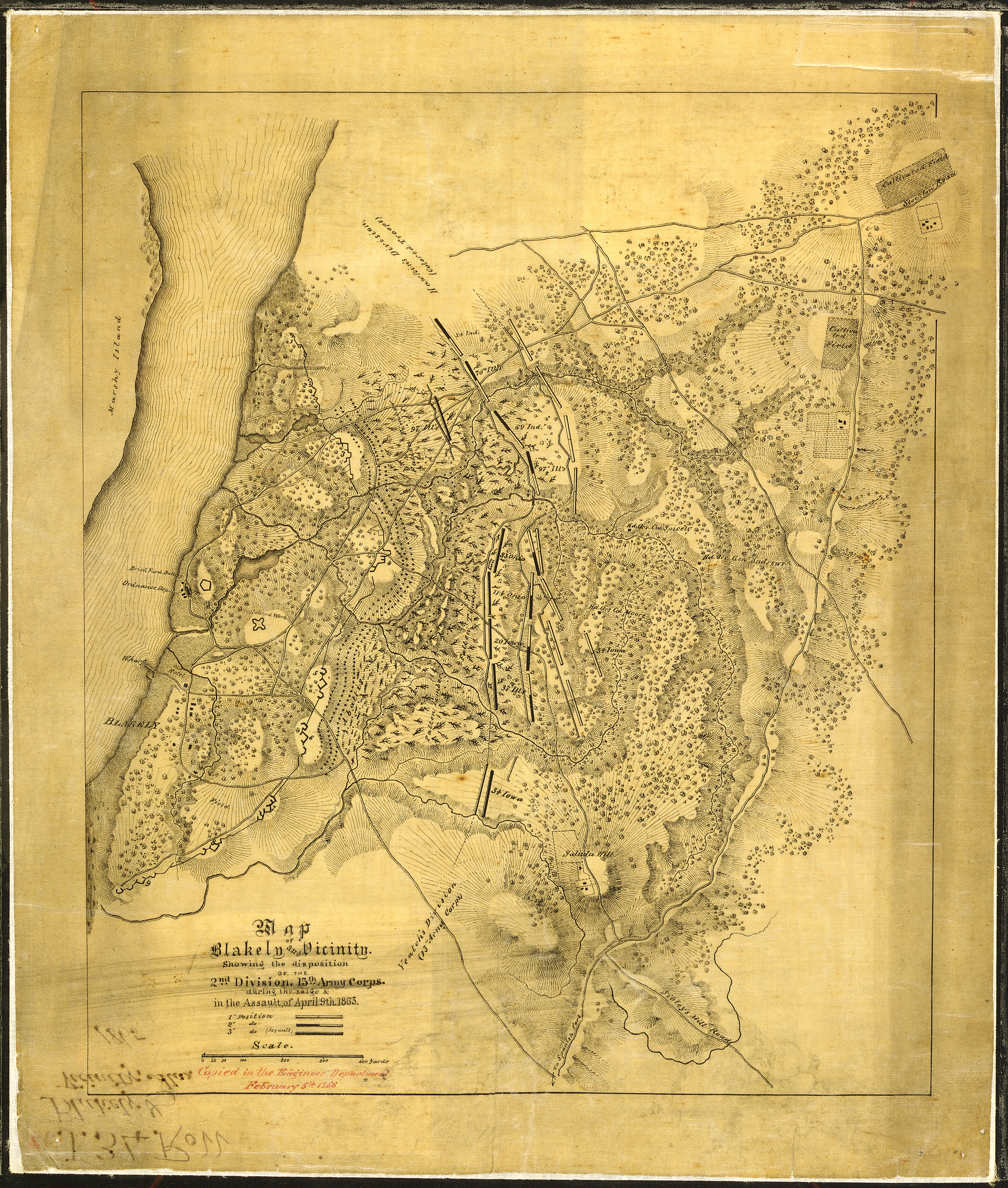
Position of 2nd Division, 13th Army Corps

Maj. Gen. Edward Canby's Union forces, the XVI and XIII Corps, moved along the eastern shore of Mobile Bay, forcing the Confederates back into their defenses. Union forces then concentrated on Spanish Fort, Alabama, and nearby Fort Blakeley. By April 1, Union forces had enveloped Spanish Fort, thereby releasing more troops to focus on Fort Blakeley. Union forces built three rings of earthworks reaching ever closer until nearly 1,000 yards (910 m) from the Fort Blakeley front. Confederate Brig. Gen. St. John R. Liddell, with about 4,000 men, held out against the much larger Union force until Spanish Fort fell on April 8 in the Battle of Spanish Fort. This allowed Canby to concentrate 16,000 men for the attack on Fort Blakeley.

== Battle ==
The final assault began on April 9, led by Brig. Gen. John P. Hawkins. Sheer numbers breached the Confederate earthworks, compelling the Confederates, including Liddell, to surrender within about 30 minutes in the final assault after 5:30 pm.

== Aftermath ==
The casualty figures are approximate, but an estimated 75 Confederate soldiers were killed, with over 2,800 captured, and 150 Union troops were killed with 650 wounded during the siege and assault. The siege and capture of Fort Blakeley was basically the last combined-force battle of the war. Yet, it is criticized by some (such as Ulysses S. Grant) as an ineffective contribution to Union war effort due to Canby's lateness in engaging his troops. The battle was actually fought hours after the Confederate General Robert E. Lee surrendered at Appomattox. The battle is considered the last major battle of the Civil War with the exception of the Battle of Columbus, Georgia, fought a few days later. African-American forces played a major role in the successful Union attack, with 5,000 colored troops of the Union U.S.C.T. brought through Pensacola, FL.

Two days later, the two nearby island batteries in the Blakeley River were abandoned. After this battle, Union forces were finally able to occupy the city of Mobile, Alabama, on April 12, 1865.

== Legacy ==
The site of the battle is now a historical park, Historic Blakeley State Park. The American Battlefield Trust and its partners, including the Historic Blakeley Foundation, have saved 126 acres of Fort Blakeley Battlefield through mid-2023.
