= Red River campaign order of battle: Union =

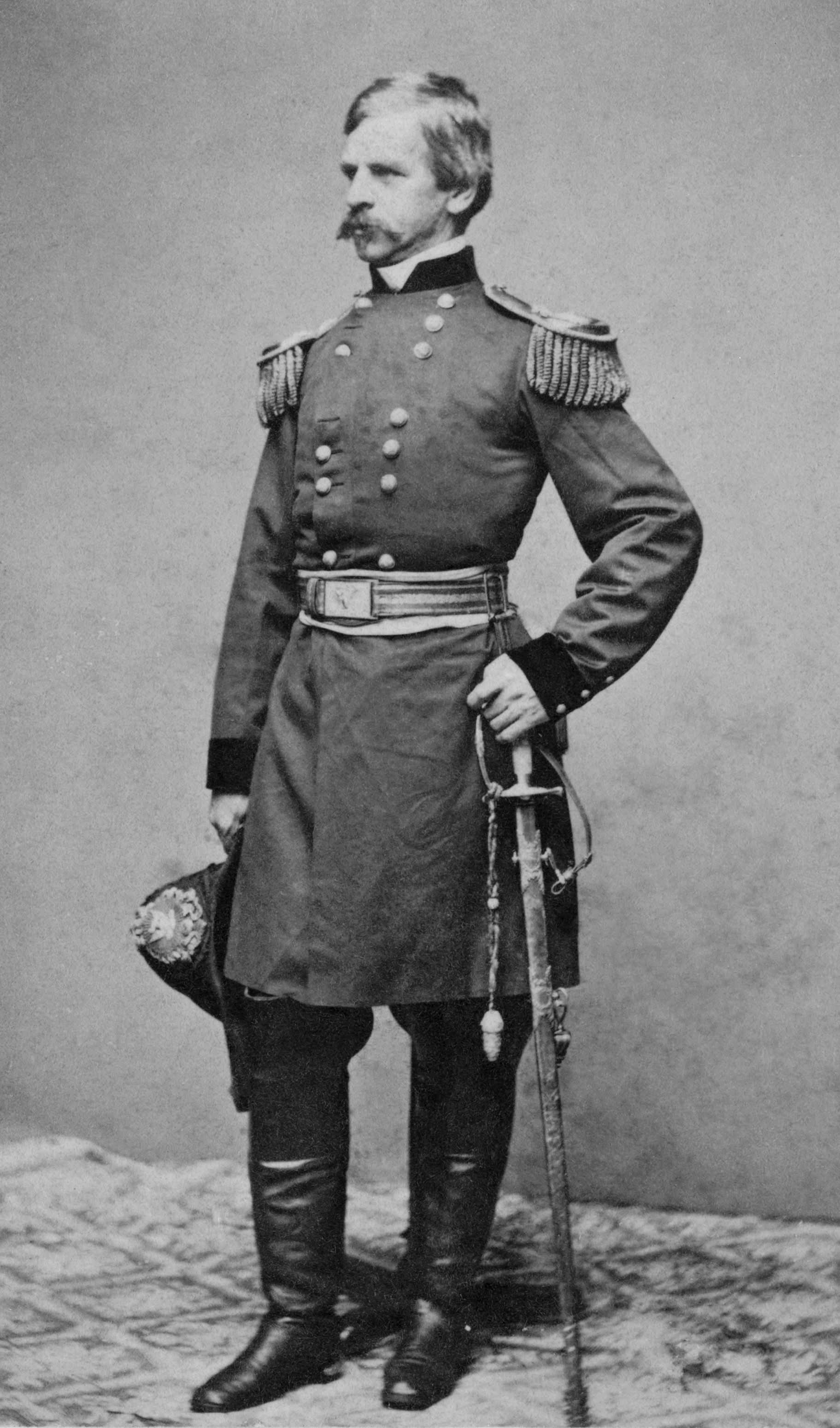
Nathaniel P. Banks

The following is the organization of the Union forces engaged in the Red River campaign, during the American Civil War in 1864. Order of battle compiled from the army organization during the campaign. The Confederate order of battle is listed separately.

== Abbreviations used ==
=== Military rank ===
- MG = Major General
- BG = Brigadier General
- Col = Colonel
- Ltc = Lieutenant Colonel
- Maj = Major
- Cpt = Captain
- Lt = 1st Lieutenant
- RA = Rear Admiral
- Cmdr = Commander
- Lcdr = Lieutenant Commander
- Ltn = Lieutenant (navy)
- Mstr = Master

=== Other ===
- w = wounded
- mw = mortally wounded
- k = killed
- c = captured

=== Naval artillery ===
- 100-pdr PR = 100-pounder Parrott rifled gun
- 50-pdr DR = 50-pounder Dahlgren gun (rifled)
- 32-pdr = 32-pounder gun (smoothbore)
- 30-pdr PR = 30-pounder Parrott rifled gun
- 20-pdr PR = 20-pounder Parrott rifled gun
- 24-pdr how = M1841 24-pounder howitzer
- 12-pdr how = M1841 12-pounder howitzer
- 11-inch = 11-inch smoothbore gun
- 9-inch = 9-inch smoothbore gun
- 8-inch = 8-inch smoothbore gun

== Union forces, March 31 ==
=== Army of the Gulf (Department of the Gulf) ===
MG Nathaniel P. Banks, Commanding
Manpower and guns are from Official Records. All manpower strengths are "Aggregate Present".
Regiments and other units in parentheses were not present and were not included in unit strengths.

Engineer Brigade
Brigade	Regiments and Others
Engineer Brigade Col George D. Robinson (872 men)	3rd Engineers, Corps d'Afrique: Ltc George A. Harmount; 5th Engineers, Corps d'Afrique: Ltc Uri B. Pearsall

- Headquarters troops (Companies A and B): Cpt Richard W. Francis
- Escort (Company C): Cpt Frank Sayles

==== XIII Corps ====
BG Thomas E. G. Ransom (w)
BG Robert A. Cameron

XIII Corps (Detachment)
Division	Brigade	Regiments and Others
1st and 2nd Divisions	All Brigades	Detached in Texas
3rd Division BG Robert A. Cameron (2,275 men)	1st Brigade Ltc Aaron M. Flory	46th Indiana: Cpt William M. DeHart; 29th Wisconsin: Maj Bradford Hancock; 11th Indiana: On veteran furlough; 24th Indiana: On veteran furlough; 34th Indiana: On veteran furlough
3rd Division BG Robert A. Cameron (2,275 men)	2nd Brigade Col William H. Raynor	24th Iowa: Maj Edward Wright; 28th Iowa: Col John Connell; 56th Ohio: Cpt Maschil Manring
3rd Division BG Robert A. Cameron (2,275 men)	Artillery (8 guns)	1st Missouri Light, Battery A: Lt Elisha Cole; Ohio Light, 2nd Battery: Lt William H. Harper
4th Division Col William J. Landram (2,990 men)	1st Brigade Col Frank Emerson (w&c)	77th Illinois: Ltc Lysander R. Webb (k), Maj John A. Burdett; 67th Indiana: Ltc Theodore E. Buehler (Non-veterans of 60th Indiana attached); 19th Kentucky: Ltc John Cowan; 23rd Wisconsin: Maj Joseph E. Greene; 60th Indiana: On veteran furlough; 1st United States: Detached at New Orleans
4th Division Col William J. Landram (2,990 men)	2nd Brigade Col Joseph W. Vance (k); Ltc Albert H. Brown	130th Illinois: Maj John B. Reid; 48th Ohio: Ltc Joseph W. Lindsey; 83rd Ohio: Ltc William H. Baldwin; 96th Ohio: Ltc Albert H. Brown; 97th Illinois: Detached at New Orleans
4th Division Col William J. Landram (2,990 men)	Artillery (10 guns) Cpt Patrick H. White; XIII Chief of artillery	Indiana Light, 1st Battery: Cpt Martin Klauss; Chicago (Illinois) Mercantile Battery: Lt Pinckney S. Cone

==== XIX Corps ====
MG William B. Franklin (w)

XIX Corps
Division	Brigade	Regiments and Others
1st Division BG William H. Emory (7,134 men)	1st Brigade BG William Dwight	29th Maine: Col George L. Beal; 114th New York: Ltc Henry B. Morse (w), Maj Oscar H. Curtis; 116th New York: Col George M. Love; 153rd New York: Col Edwin P. Davis; 161st New York: Ltc William B. Kinsey; 30th Massachusetts: On veteran furlough
1st Division BG William H. Emory (7,134 men)	2nd Brigade BG James W. McMillan	13th Maine: Col Henry Rust, Jr.; 15th Maine: Col Isaac Dyer; 160th New York: Ltc John B. Van Petten; 47th Pennsylvania: Col Tilghman H. Good; 8th Vermont: On veteran furlough
1st Division BG William H. Emory (7,134 men)	3rd Brigade Col Lewis Benedict (k); Col Francis Fessenden (w); Ltc Justus W. Blanchard	30th Maine: Col Francis Fessenden, Ltc Thomas H. Hubbard; 162nd New York: Ltc Justus W. Blanchard; 165th New York: Ltc Gouverneur Carr (w), Cpt Henry C. Inwood; 173rd New York: Col Lewis M. Peck, Cpt Howard C. Conrady
1st Division BG William H. Emory (7,134 men)	Artillery (14 guns) Cpt George T. Hebard	New York Light, 25th Battery: Lt Irving D. Southworth; 1st United States, Battery L: Lt Franck E. Taylor; Vermont Light, 1st Battery: Cpt George T. Hebard
2nd Division BG Cuvier Grover (4,477 men)	1st Brigade	Detached at Carrollton
2nd Division BG Cuvier Grover (4,477 men)	2nd Brigade BG Henry Warner Birge; Col Edward L. Molineux	13th Connecticut: Col Charles D. Blinn; 1st Louisiana: Col William O. Fiske; 90th New York (3 companies): Maj John C. Smart; 159th New York: Ltc Edward L. Gaul; 90th New York (7 companies): Detached in Lafourche District; 131st New York: Detached at Brashear City
2nd Division BG Cuvier Grover (4,477 men)	3rd Brigade Col Jacob Sharpe	38th Massachusetts: Ltc James P. Richardson; 128th New York: Col James Smith; 156th New York: Cpt James J. Hoyt; 175th New York (3 companies): Cpt Charles McCarthey
2nd Division BG Cuvier Grover (4,477 men)	Artillery (18 guns) Cpt George W. Fox	7th Massachusetts Battery: Cpt Newman W. Storer; New York Light, 26th Battery: Cpt George W. Fox; 1st United States, Battery F: Lt Hardman P. Norris; 2nd United States, Battery C: Lt John I. Rodgers
2nd Division BG Cuvier Grover (4,477 men)	Cavalry	3rd Maryland: Col C. Carroll Tevis
Corps Artillery Reserve Cpt Henry W. Closson; XIX chief of artillery	Artillery (280 men, 14 guns)	Delaware Light, 1st Battery: Cpt Benjamin Nields; 1st Indiana Heavy (two companies): Cpt William S. Hinkle
Corps d'Afrique (United States Colored Troops)	1st Brigade, 1st Division Col William H. Dickey (1,745 men)	1st Infantry (73rd U.S.C.T.): Maj Hiram E. Perkins; 3rd Infantry (75th U.S.C.T.): Col Henry W. Fuller; 12th Infantry (84th U.S.C.T.): Cpt James H. Corrin; 22nd Infantry (92nd U.S.C.T.): Col Henry N. Frisbie
Cavalry Division BG Albert L. Lee (5,333 men)	1st Brigade Col Thomas J. Lucas	16th Indiana Infantry (mounted): Ltc James H. Redfield; 2nd Louisiana Infantry (mounted): Maj Alfred Hodsdon; 6th Missouri: Cpt Sidney A. Breese (Howitzer battery, under Captain Herbert H. Rottaken, attached.); 14th New York: Maj Abraham Bassford
Cavalry Division BG Albert L. Lee (5,333 men)	2nd Brigade	Detached at Port Hudson
Cavalry Division BG Albert L. Lee (5,333 men)	3rd Brigade Col Harai Robinson	87th Illinois Infantry (mounted): Ltc John M. Crebs; 1st Louisiana: Maj Algernon Sidney Badger
Cavalry Division BG Albert L. Lee (5,333 men)	4th Brigade Col Nathan Dudley	2nd Illinois: Maj Benjamin F. Marsh, Jr.; 3rd Massachusetts: Ltc Lorenzo D. Sargent; 31st Massachusetts Infantry (mounted): Cpt Elbert H. Fordham; 8th New Hampshire Infantry (mounted): Ltc George A. Flanders
Cavalry Division BG Albert L. Lee (5,333 men)	5th Brigade Col Oliver P. Gooding	2nd New York Veteran: Col Morgan H. Chrysler; 18th New York: Col James J. Byrne; 3rd Rhode Island (detachment): Maj George R. Davis
Cavalry Division BG Albert L. Lee (5,333 men)	Artillery Brigade (12 guns)	2nd Massachusetts Battery: Cpt Ormand F. Nims; 5th United States, Battery G: Lt Jacob B. Rawles

=== Army of the Tennessee (detachment) ===
BG Andrew J. Smith

==== XVI Corps ====
XVI Corps: Army of the Tennessee (Detachment)
Division	Brigade	Regiments and Others
1st Division BG Joseph A. Mower (2,431 men)	1st Brigade	Detached at Memphis
1st Division BG Joseph A. Mower (2,431 men)	2nd Brigade Col Lucius F. Hubbard	47th Illinois: Col John D. McClure; 5th Minnesota: Maj John C. Becht; 8th Wisconsin: Ltc John W. Jefferson; 11th Missouri: On veteran furlough
1st Division BG Joseph A. Mower (2,431 men)	3rd Brigade Col Sylvester G. Hill	35th Iowa: Ltc William B. Keeler; 33rd Missouri: Ltc William H. Heath (w), Maj George Van Beck; 8th Iowa: On veteran furlough; 12th Iowa: On veteran furlough
1st Division BG Joseph A. Mower (2,431 men)	Artillery	Detached at Memphis and Vicksburg
3rd Division BG Joseph A. Mower (6,151 men)	1st Brigade Col William F. Lynch	58th Illinois: Maj Thomas Newlan; 119th Illinois: Col Thomas J. Kinney; 89th Indiana: Col Charles D. Murray
3rd Division BG Joseph A. Mower (6,151 men)	2nd Brigade Col William T. Shaw	14th Iowa: Ltc Joseph H. Newbold; 27th Iowa: Col James I. Gilbert; 32nd Iowa: Col John Scott; 24th Missouri: Maj Robert W. Fyan (Non-veterans of 21st Missouri attached)
3rd Division BG Joseph A. Mower (6,151 men)	3rd Brigade Col Risdon M. Moore	49th Illinois: Maj Thomas W. Morgan; 117th Illinois: Ltc Jonathan Merriam; 178th New York: Col Edward Wehler
3rd Division BG Joseph A. Mower (6,151 men)	Artillery (10 guns) Cpt James M. Cockefair	Indiana Light, 3rd Battery: Cpt James M. Cockefair; Indiana Light, 9th Battery: Cpt George R. Brown
2nd and 4th Divisions	1st, 2nd, and 3rd Brigades	Serving in Atlanta campaign

==== XVII Corps ====
XVII Corps: Army of the Tennessee (Detachment)
Division	Brigade	Regiments and Others
Provisional Division BG T. Kilby Smith (2,039 men)	1st Brigade Col Jonathan B. Moore	41st Illinois: Ltc John H. Nale; 3rd Iowa: Ltc James Tullis; 33rd Wisconsin: Maj. Horatio H. Virgin
Provisional Division BG T. Kilby Smith (2,039 men)	2nd Brigade Col Lyman M. Ward	81st Illinois: Ltc Andrew W. Rogers; 95th Illinois: Col Thomas W. Humphrey; 14th Wisconsin: Cpt Carlos M. G. Mansfield
Provisional Division BG T. Kilby Smith (2,039 men)	Artillery (4 guns)	1st Missouri, Battery M: Lt John H. Tiemeyer

== Union forces, April 30 ==
=== Army of the Gulf (Department of the Gulf) ===
MG Nathaniel P. Banks, Commanding

Engineer Brigade
Brigade	Regiments and Others
Engineer Brigade Col George D. Robinson (811 men)	97th U.S. Colored Infantry: Ltc George A. Harmount; 99th U.S. Colored Infantry: Ltc Uri B. Pearsall

- Headquarters troops (Companies A and B): Cpt Richard W. Francis
- Escort (Company C): Cpt Frank Sayles

==== XIII Corps (detachment) ====
MG John A. McClernand
Corps headquarters and 2nd Brigade, 1st Division, reached Alexandria, April 26.
Warren brought additional troops from Texas but they only reached Fort De Russy and are not listed.

XIII Corps (Detachment)
Division	Brigade	Regiments and Others
1st Division BG Fitz Henry Warren (2,383 men)	2nd Brigade BG Michael K. Lawler	49th Indiana: Col James Keigwin; 69th Indiana: Ltc Oran Perry; 34th Iowa: Col George W. Clark; 22nd Kentucky: Col George W. Monroe; 16th Ohio: Ltc Philip Kershner; 114th Ohio: Ltc John H. Kelly; 7th Kentucky: Detached at Baton Rouge; 42nd Ohio: Detached at Baton Rouge; 120th Ohio: Detached at Baton Rouge
2nd Division	All brigades	Detached in Texas
3rd Division BG Robert A. Cameron (2,333 men)	1st Brigade Col Thomas H. Bringhurst	46th Indiana: Cpt Henry Snyder; 29th Wisconsin: Col William A. Green; 11th Indiana: On veteran furlough; 24th Indiana: On veteran furlough; 34th Indiana: On veteran furlough
3rd Division BG Robert A. Cameron (2,333 men)	2nd Brigade Col James R. Slack	47th Indiana: Ltc John A. McLaughlin; 24th Iowa: Maj Edward Wright; 28th Iowa, Ltc Bartholomew W. Wilson; 56th Ohio: Col William H. Raynor
4th Division Col William J. Landram (1,784 men)	1st Brigade Col Frederick W. Moore	77th Illinois: Maj John A. Burdett; 19th Kentucky: Cpt William T. Cummins; 83rd Ohio: Ltc William H. Baldwin; 23rd Wisconsin: Maj Joseph E. Greene; 60th Indiana: On veteran furlough; 1st United States: Detached at New Orleans
4th Division Col William J. Landram (1,784 men)	2nd Brigade Col John R. Parker	130th Illinois: Cpt John H. Robinson; 67th Indiana: Maj Francis A. Sears; 48th Ohio: Cpt James R. Lynch; 96th Ohio: Ltc Albert H. Brown; 97th Illinois: Detached at New Orleans
Artillery Maj Adolph Schwartz (396 men, 18 guns)	Unbrigaded	Indiana Light, 1st Battery: Lt Lawrence Jacoby; 1st Missouri Light, Battery A: Lt Elisha Cole; Ohio Light, 2nd Battery: Lt William H. Harper; Wisconsin Light, 1st Battery: Cpt Jacob T. Foster; Chicago (Illinois) Mercantile Battery: Lt Henry Roe, at New Orleans; Battery A, 2nd Illinois: Detached at New Orleans; Battery E, 2nd Illinois: Detached at Baton Rouge; Battery B, 1st Missouri: Detached at Brownsville, Texas; Battery E, 1st Missouri: Detached at Brownsville, Texas; Battery F, 1st Missouri: Detached at Matagorda Island, Texas; Battery G, 1st Michigan: Detached at Matagorda Island, Texas; 16th Ohio Battery: Detached at Matagorda Island, Texas; 17th Ohio Battery: Detached at New Orleans
Unattached		Independent Company Kentucky Engineers: Cpt William F. Patterson

==== XIX Corps ====
MG William B. Franklin (until May 2)
BG William H. Emory

XIX Corps
Division	Brigade	Regiments and Others
1st Division BG William H. Emory; BG James W. McMillan (6,392 men)	1st Brigade Col George L. Beal	29th Maine: Ltc Charles S. Emerson; 114th New York: Maj Oscar H. Curtis; 116th New York: Col George M. Love; 153rd New York: Col Edwin P. Davis; 161st New York: Ltc William B. Kinsey; 30th Massachusetts: On veteran furlough
1st Division BG William H. Emory; BG James W. McMillan (6,392 men)	2nd Brigade BG James W. McMillan	13th Maine: Col Henry Rust, Jr.; 15th Maine: Col Isaac Dyer; 160th New York: Ltc John B. Van Petten; 47th Pennsylvania: Col Tilghman H. Good; 8th Vermont: On veteran furlough
1st Division BG William H. Emory; BG James W. McMillan (6,392 men)	3rd Brigade Ltc Justus W. Blanchard	30th Maine: Ltc Thomas H. Hubbard; 162nd New York: Ltc Cpt Samuel Cowdrey; 165th New York: Cpt Henry C. Inwood; 173rd New York: Cpt Howard C. Conrady
1st Division BG William H. Emory; BG James W. McMillan (6,392 men)	Artillery (14 guns) Cpt Benjamin Nields	New York Light, 25th Battery: Lt Irving D. Southworth; 1st United States, Battery L: Lt Franck E. Taylor; Delaware Light, 1st Battery: Lieutenant Thomas A. Porter
2nd Division BG Cuvier Grover (4,907 men)	1st Brigade (Reached Alexandria, La., April 18.) BG Frank S. Nickerson	133rd New York: Col Leonard D. H. Currie; 176th New York: Maj Charles Lewis; 9th Connecticut On veteran furlough; 12th Maine On veteran furlough
2nd Division BG Cuvier Grover (4,907 men)	2nd Brigade BG Henry W. Birge	13th Connecticut: Col Charles D. Blinn; 1st Louisiana: Col William O. Fiske; 159th New York: Col Edward L. Molineux; 90th New York: Detached at Donaldsonville; 131st New York: Detached at Brashear City
2nd Division BG Cuvier Grover (4,907 men)	3rd Brigade Col Jacob Sharpe	38th Massachusetts: Ltc James P. Richardson; 128th New York: Ltc James P. Foster; 156th New York: Cpt James J. Hoyt; 175th New York (3 companies): Cpt Charles McCarthey
2nd Division BG Cuvier Grover (4,907 men)	Artillery (14 guns) Cpt George W. Fox	7th Massachusetts Battery: Cpt Newman W. Storer; New York Light, 26th Battery: Cpt George W. Fox; 2nd United States, Battery C: Lt John I. Rodgers
3rd Division; Detached in New Orleans	Artillery Reserve (295 men, 14 guns) Cpt Henry W. Closson; XIX Corps Chief of artillery	Vermont Light, 1st Battery: Lt Edward Rice; 1st Indiana Heavy (two companies): Cpt William S. Hinkle
Corps d'Afrique (United States Colored Troops)	1st Brigade, 1st Division Col William H. Dickey (1,745 men)	1st Infantry (73rd U.S.C.T.): Maj Hiram E. Perkins; 3rd Infantry (75th U.S. C.T.): Col Henry W. Fuller; 12th Infantry (84th U.S.C.T.): Cpt James H. Corrin; 22nd Infantry (92nd U.S.C.T.): Col Henry N. Frisbie
Cavalry Division BG Richard Arnold (6,210 men); Arnold relieved Lee, April 18	1st Brigade Col Thomas J. Lucas	12th Illinois: Col Hasbrouck Davis; 16th Indiana Infantry (mounted): Cpt James M. Hildreth; 2nd Louisiana Infantry (mounted): Col Charles Everett; 6th Missouri: Maj Bacon Montgomery
Cavalry Division BG Richard Arnold (6,210 men); Arnold relieved Lee, April 18	2nd Brigade	Detached at Port Hudson
Cavalry Division BG Richard Arnold (6,210 men); Arnold relieved Lee, April 18	3rd Brigade Ltc John M. Crebs	87th Illinois Infantry (mounted): Maj George W. Land; 1st Louisiana: Maj Algernon Sidney Badger
Cavalry Division BG Richard Arnold (6,210 men); Arnold relieved Lee, April 18	4th Brigade Col Edmund J. Davis	2nd Illinois: Maj Benjamin F. Marsh, Jr.; 3rd Massachusetts: Ltc Lorenzo D. Sargent; 31st Massachusetts Infantry (mounted): Cpt Elbert H. Fordham; 8th New Hampshire Infantry (mounted): Ltc George A. Flanders
Cavalry Division BG Richard Arnold (6,210 men); Arnold relieved Lee, April 18	5th Brigade Col Oliver P. Gooding	2nd New York Veteran: Col Morgan H. Chrysler; 18th New York: Col James J. Byrne; 3rd Rhode Island: Ltc Charles H. Parkhurst
Cavalry Division BG Richard Arnold (6,210 men); Arnold relieved Lee, April 18	Artillery Brigade (6 guns)	2nd Massachusetts Battery: Cpt Ormand F. Nims; 1st United States, Battery F: Lt William L. Haskin; 5th United States, Battery G: Lt Jacob B. Rawles
Unattached		4th Indiana Cavalry, Company C: Cpt Andrew P. Gallagher; 3rd Maryland Cavalry: Ltc Byron Kirby

=== Army of the Tennessee (detachment) ===
BG Andrew J. Smith

==== XVI Corps ====
XVI Corps received approximately 1,000 replacements on April 26.

XVI Corps: Army of the Tennessee (Detachment)
Division	Brigade	Regiments and Others
1st Division BG Joseph A. Mower (4,101 men)	1st Brigade	On expedition from Memphis against N. B. Forrest
1st Division BG Joseph A. Mower (4,101 men)	2nd Brigade Col Lucius F. Hubbard	47th Illinois: Col John D. McClure; 5th Minnesota: Maj John C. Becht; 8th Wisconsin: Ltc John W. Jefferson; 11th Missouri: On veteran furlough
1st Division BG Joseph A. Mower (4,101 men)	3rd Brigade Col Sylvester G. Hill	35th Iowa: Ltc William B. Keeler; 33rd Missouri: Maj George W. Van Beek; 8th Iowa: On veteran furlough; 12th Iowa: On veteran furlough
3rd Division BG Joseph A. Mower (5,464 men)	1st Brigade Col William F. Lynch	58th Illinois: Maj Thomas Newlan; 119th Illinois: Col Thomas J. Kinney; 89th Indiana: Col Charles D. Murray
3rd Division BG Joseph A. Mower (5,464 men)	2nd Brigade Col William T. Shaw	14th Iowa: Cpt Warren C. Jones; 27th Iowa: Col James I. Gilbert; 32nd Iowa: Col John Scott; 24th Missouri: Maj Robert W. Fyan
3rd Division BG Joseph A. Mower (5,464 men)	3rd Brigade Col Risdon M. Moore	49th Illinois: Cpt Jacob E. Gauen; 117th Illinois: Ltc Jonathan Merriam; 178th New York: Col Edward Wehler
3rd Division BG Joseph A. Mower (5,464 men)	Artillery (10 guns) Cpt James M. Cockefair	Indiana Light, 3rd Battery: Cpt James M. Cockefair; Indiana Light, 9th Battery: Cpt George R. Brown

==== XVII Corps ====
XVII Corps: Army of the Tennessee (Detachment)
Division	Brigade	Regiments and Others
Provisional Division BG T. Kilby Smith (2,052 men)	1st Brigade Col Jonathan B. Moore	41st Illinois: Ltc John H. Nale; 3rd Iowa: Ltc James Tullis; 33rd Wisconsin: Maj. Horatio H. Virgin
Provisional Division BG T. Kilby Smith (2,052 men)	2nd Brigade Col Lyman M. Ward	81st Illinois: Ltc Andrew W. Rogers; 95th Illinois: Col Thomas W. Humphrey; 14th Wisconsin: Cpt Carlos M. G. Mansfield
Provisional Division BG T. Kilby Smith (2,052 men)	Artillery (4 guns)	1st Missouri, Battery M: Lt John H. Tiemeyer

== Union naval forces ==
=== Mississippi Flotilla ===
RA David Dixon Porter

U.S. Navy Mississippi Flotilla in the Red River Expedition
Warship	Type	Master	Armament
USS Benton	Ironclad	Lcdr James A. Greer	2 × 100-pdr PR, 8 × 9-inch, 2 × 50-pdr DR, 4 × 32-pdr
USS Carondelet	Ironclad	Lcdr J. G. Mitchell	2 × 100-pdr PR, 3 × 9-inch, 4 × 8-inch, 1 × 50-pdr DR, 1 × 30-pdr PR
USS Chillicothe	Ironclad	Ltn Joseph P. Couthouy	2 × 11-inch, 1 × 12-pdr how
USS Choctaw	Ironclad	Lcdr Francis M. Ramsay	1 × 100-pdr PR, 3 × 9-inch, 2 × 30-pdr PR, 2 × 12-pdr how
USS Eastport	Ironclad	Lcdr Seth L. Phelps	2 × 100-pdr PR, 4 × 9-inch, 2 × 50-pdr DR
USS Essex	Ironclad	Cmdr Robert Townsend	2 × 100-pdr PR, 6 × 9-inch, 4 × 12-pdr how
USS Lafayette	Ironclad	Lcdr J. P. Foster	2 × 11-inch, 2 × 9-inch, 2 × 100-pdr PR, 2 × 24-pdr how, 2 × 12-pdr how
USS Louisville	Ironclad	Lcdr Elias K. Owen	1 × 100-pdr PR, 4 × 9-inch, 2 × 30-pdr PR, 4 × 32-pdr
USS Mound City	Ironclad	Ltn A. R. Langthorne	1 × 100-pdr PR, 4 × 9-inch, 3 × 8-inch, 1 × 50-pdr DR, 1 × 30-pdr PR, 2 × 32-pdr
USS Pittsburgh	Ironclad	Ltn William R. Hoel	4 × 9-inch, 1 × 100-pdr PR, 2 × 30-pdr PR
USS Neosho	Monitor	Ltn Samuel Howard	2 × 11-inch, 2 × 12-pdr how
USS Osage	Monitor	Lcdr Thomas O. Selfridge Jr.	2 × 11-inch, 2 × 12-pdr how
USS Ozark	Monitor	Ltn George W. Brown	2 × 11-inch, 1 × 12-pdr how
USS Cricket	Tinclad	Mstr H. H. Gorringe	2 × 20-pdr PR, 4 × 24-pdr how, 1 × 12-pdr how
USS Gazelle	Tinclad	Mstr Charles Thatcher	6 × 24-pdr how
USS Juliet	Tinclad	Mstr J. S. Watson	6 × 24-pdr how
USS Signal	Tinclad	Ltn Edward Morgan	4 × 24-pdr how, 2 × 12-pdr how
USS Black Hawk	Gunboat	Lcdr Kidder Breese	2 × 30-pdr PR, 8 × 24-pdr how, 3 × 12-pdr how, 2 × repeating guns, 1 × Parmenter gun
USS Covington	Gunboat	Ltn George P. Lord	2 × 50-pdr DR, 2 × 30-pdr PR, 4 × 24-pdr how, 1 × 12-pdr how
USS Lexington	Gunboat	Ltn George M. Bache	4 × 8-inch, 1 × 32-pdr, 2 × 30-pdr PR
USS Fort Hindman	Gunboat	Ltn John Pearce	6 × 8-inch, 1 × 12-pdr how
USS Ouachita	Gunboat	Lcdr Byron Wilson	5 × 30-pdr PR, 18 × 24-pdr how, 16 × 12-pdr how
USS Benefit	Transport	Lcdr S. W. Terry	none
