= Battle of Champion Hill order of battle: Union =

The following Union Army units and commanders fought in the Battle of Champion Hill of the American Civil War. The Confederate order of battle is listed separately. Order of battle compiled from the army organization, returns of casualties and reports.

== Abbreviations used ==
=== Military rank ===
- MG = Major General
- BG = Brigadier General
- Col = Colonel
- Ltc = Lieutenant Colonel
- Maj = Major
- Cpt = Captain
- Lt = 1st Lieutenant

=== Other ===
- w = wounded
- mw = mortally wounded
- k = killed

== Army of the Tennessee ==
MG Ulysses S. Grant

=== XIII Corps ===
MG John A. McClernand
Escort:

- 3rd Illinois Cavalry (Company L): Cpt David R. Sparks

Division	Brigade	Regiments and Others
Ninth Division; BG Peter J. Osterhaus	1st Brigade BG Theophilus T. Garrard	118th Illinois: Col John G. Fonda; 49th Indiana: Col James Keigwin; 69th Indiana: Col Thomas W. Bennett; 7th Kentucky: Ltc John Lucas
Ninth Division; BG Peter J. Osterhaus	17th Brigade Col Daniel W. Lindsey	22nd Kentucky: Ltc George W. Monroe; 16th Ohio: Cpt Eli W. Botsford; 42nd Ohio: Maj Frederick A. Williams; 114th Ohio: Col John Cradlebaugh
Ninth Division; BG Peter J. Osterhaus	Artillery	Battery G, 1st Michigan Light Artillery: Cpt Charles H. Lamphere; 1st Wisconsin Light Artillery: Lt Charles B. Kimball
Ninth Division; BG Peter J. Osterhaus	Cavalry	3rd Illinois Cavalry (Companies A, E, & K): Cpt John L. Campbell
Tenth Division; BG Andrew J. Smith	1st Brigade BG Stephen G. Burbridge	16th Indiana: Col Thomas J. Lucas; 67th Indiana: Ltc Theodore E. Buehler; 83rd Ohio: Col Frederick W. Moore; 23rd Wisconsin: Col Joshua J. Guppey
Tenth Division; BG Andrew J. Smith	2nd Brigade Col William J. Landram	77th Illinois: Col David P. Grier; 97th Illinois: Col Friend S. Rutherford; 108th Illinois: Ltc Charles Turner; 130th Illinois: Col Nathaniel Niles; 19th Kentucky: Ltc John Cowan; 48th Ohio: Ltc Job R. Parker
Tenth Division; BG Andrew J. Smith	Artillery	Chicago Mercantile Battery, Illinois Light Artillery: Cpt Patrick H. White; 17th Ohio Light Artillery: Cpt Ambrose A. Blount
Tenth Division; BG Andrew J. Smith	Cavalry	4th Indiana Cavalry (Company C): Cpt Andrew P. Gallagher
Twelfth Division; BG Alvin P. Hovey	1st Brigade BG George F. McGinnis	11th Indiana: Col Daniel Macauley (w), Ltc William W. Darnell; 24th Indiana: Col William T. Spicely; 34th Indiana: Maj Robert B. Jones; 46th Indiana: Col Thomas H. Bringhurst; 29th Wisconsin: Col Charles R. Gill
Twelfth Division; BG Alvin P. Hovey	2nd Brigade Col James R. Slack	47th Indiana: Ltc John A. McLaughlin; 24th Iowa: Col Eber C. Byam; 28th Iowa: Col John Connell; 56th Ohio: Ltc William H. Raynor
Twelfth Division; BG Alvin P. Hovey	Artillery	2nd Ohio Battery: Lt Augustus Beach; 16th Ohio Battery: Cpt James A. Mitchell (mw), Lt Russell P. Twist; Battery A, 1st Missouri Light Artillery: Cpt George W. Schofield
Twelfth Division; BG Alvin P. Hovey	Cavalry	1st Indiana Cavalry (Company C): Lt James L. Carey
Fourteenth Division; BG Eugene A. Carr	1st Brigade BG William P. Benton	33rd Illinois: Col Charles E. Lippincott; 99th Illinois: Col George W. K. Bailey; 8th Indiana: Col David Shunk; 18th Indiana: Col Henry D. Washburn
Fourteenth Division; BG Eugene A. Carr	2nd Brigade BG Michael K. Lawler	21st Iowa: Col Samuel Merrill; 22nd Iowa: Col William M. Stone; 23rd Iowa: Col William H. Kinsman; 11th Wisconsin: Col Charles L. Harris
Fourteenth Division; BG Eugene A. Carr	Artillery	Battery A, 2nd Illinois Light Artillery (4 guns): Lt Frank B. Fenton; 1st Indiana Light Artillery: Cpt Martin Klauss
Fourteenth Division; BG Eugene A. Carr	Unattached units	2nd Illinois Cavalry (7 companies): Ltc Daniel B. Bush Jr.; 6th Missouri Cavalry (7 companies): Col Clark Wright; Kentucky Engineers & Mechanics: Cpt William F. Patterson

=== XV Corps ===
MG William T. Sherman

Division	Brigade	Regiments and Others
Second Division [attached to XIII Corps] MG Francis Preston Blair Jr.	1st Brigade Col Giles A. Smith	113th Illinois: Col George B. Hoge; 116th Illinois: Col Nathan W. Tupper; 6th Missouri: Ltc Ira Boutell; 8th Missouri: Ltc David C. Coleman; 13th U.S. Infantry, 1st Battalion: Cpt E. Washington
Second Division [attached to XIII Corps] MG Francis Preston Blair Jr.	2nd Brigade Col Thomas Kilby Smith	55th Illinois: Col Oscar Malmborg; 127th Illinois: Col Hamilton N. Eldridge; 83rd Indiana: Col Benjamin J. Spooner; 54th Ohio: Ltc Cyrus W. Fisher; 57th Ohio: Col Americus V. Rice
Second Division [attached to XIII Corps] MG Francis Preston Blair Jr.	Artillery	Battery A, 1st Illinois Light Artillery: Cpt Peter P. Wood; Battery B, 1st Illinois Light Artillery: Cpt Samuel E. Barrett

=== XVII Corps ===
MG James B. McPherson

Provisional Cavalry Battalion: Cpt John S. Foster

- 2nd Illinois Cavalry (Companies A & B): Lt W. B. Cummins
- 4th Missouri Cavalry (Company F): Lt A. Mueller
- 4th Independent Company Ohio Cavalry: Cpt John S. Foster

Division	Brigade	Regiments and Others
Third Division; MG John A. Logan	1st Brigade BG John E. Smith	20th Illinois: Maj Daniel Bradley; 31st Illinois: Ltc John D. Reese; 45th Illinois: Col Jasper A. Maltby; 124th Illinois: Col Thomas J. Sloan; 23rd Indiana: Ltc William P. Davis
Third Division; MG John A. Logan	2nd Brigade BG Mortimer D. Leggett	30th Illinois: Ltc Warren Shedd; 20th Ohio: Col Manning F. Force; 68th Ohio: Ltc John S. Snook (k); 78th Ohio: Ltc Greenbury F. Wiles
Third Division; MG John A. Logan	3rd Brigade BG John Dunlap Stevenson	8th Illinois: Ltc Robert H. Sturgess; 81st Illinois: Col James J. Dollins; 7th Missouri: Cpt Robert Buchanan; 32nd Ohio: Col Benjamin F. Potts
Third Division; MG John A. Logan	Artillery	Battery D, 1st Illinois Light Artillery (4 guns): Cpt Henry A. Rogers; Battery L, 2nd Illinois Light Artillery (4 guns): Cpt William H. Bolton; Battery H, 1st Michigan Light Artillery: Cpt Samuel De Golyer; 3rd Ohio Battery: Cpt William S. Williams
Seventh Division; BG Marcellus M. Crocker; BG Isaac F. Quinby	1st Brigade Col John B. Sanborn	48th Indiana: Col Norman Eddy; 59th Indiana: Col Jesse I. Alexander; 4th Minnesota: Ltc John E. Tourtellotte; 18th Wisconsin: Col Gabriel Bouck
Seventh Division; BG Marcellus M. Crocker; BG Isaac F. Quinby	2nd Brigade Col Samuel A. Holmes	17th Iowa: Col David B. Hillis; 10th Missouri: Ltc Leonidas Horney (k), Maj Francis C. Deimling; 24th Missouri (Company E): Lt Vincent Chalefoux
Seventh Division; BG Marcellus M. Crocker; BG Isaac F. Quinby	3rd Brigade Col George B. Boomer	93rd Illinois: Col. Holden Putnam; 5th Iowa: Ltc Ezekiel S. Sampson; 10th Iowa: Col William E. Small; 26th Missouri: Maj Charles F. Brown
Seventh Division; BG Marcellus M. Crocker; BG Isaac F. Quinby	Artillery Cpt Frank C. Sands	Company M, 1st Missouri Light Artillery: Lt Junius G. W. McMurray; 11th Ohio Battery: Lt Fletcher E. Armstrong; 6th Wisconsin Light Artillery: Cpt Henry Dillon; 12th Wisconsin Light Artillery (4 guns): Cpt William Zickerick

== See also ==
- Mississippi in the American Civil War
