= Oliver Paul Gooding =

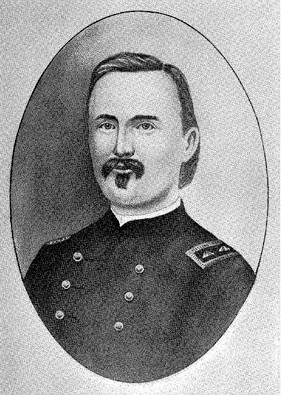
- Oliver Paul Gooding
- Born: 29 January 1835; Moscow, Indiana
- Died: 19 September 1909 (aged 74) Washington, D.C.
- Branch: United States Army
- Service years: 1858–1865
- Rank: Colonel; Brevet Major General
- Conflicts: Utah War; American Civil War; Capture of New Orleans (1862); Battle of Fort Bisland (1863); Battle of Vermilion Bayou (1863); Siege of Port Hudson (1863); Red River campaign (1864)
- Other work: Police commissioner

Oliver Paul Gooding (29 January 1835 – 19 September 1909) was an officer in the Union Army during the American Civil War and was brevetted Major General for his war service. He graduated from the United States Military Academy in 1858 and served in the Utah expedition. After the Civil War broke out, he was named colonel of an infantry regiment and accompanied the New Orleans expedition in 1862. He led an infantry brigade at Fort Bisland and Port Hudson in 1863. He led a cavalry brigade in the Red River campaign in 1864. After the war, he practiced law and wrote two religious books.

== Early career ==
Oliver Paul Gooding was born in Moscow, Indiana, on 29 January 1835. He and his parents moved to Greenfield, Indiana, in 1837. He enrolled in the U.S. Military Academy, commonly known as West Point, at 18 years of age. He graduated 24th out of 27 in his class in 1858. He was posted to the 4th U.S. Infantry at Fort Columbus in New York Harbor as a brevet second lieutenant. On 5 February 1859, Gooding was promoted to full second lieutenant and assigned to the 10th U.S. Infantry. He joined his unit at Fort Bridger in August 1859 and participated in the Utah War, a dispute between Mormon pioneers and the United States. In 1861, he was ordered to return to Washington, D.C. and on 7 May 1861, he was promoted to first lieutenant in the 10th Infantry.

== Civil War ==
=== 1862 ===
On 18 February 1862, Gooding was promoted colonel of the 31st Massachusetts Infantry Regiment and sent to the Gulf of Mexico. On 8 March 1862, the first three regiments of Major General Benjamin F. Butler's expedition landed at Ship Island. Other Union army units, including Gooding's regiment, arrived shortly afterward. At 2:00 am on 24 April 1862, Rear Admiral David G. Farragut's fleet began the Battle of Forts Jackson and St. Philip, successfully ran past the forts, and by dawn, the Capture of New Orleans was assured. Butler's army occupied the city on 1 May. Butler's occupation force numbered about 6,000 troops and was made up of six infantry regiments, including Gooding's 31st Massachusetts, two cavalry companies, and three artillery batteries. From 20 September 1862 to 19 January 1863, Gooding commanded Forts Jackson and St. Philip. On 8 November 1862, Butler was replaced in command of the Department of the Gulf by Major General Nathaniel P. Banks, who was to be reinforced by 10,000 troops. The formal transfer occurred on 16 December.

=== 1863 ===
At the end of March 1863, Banks began preparing for the First Bayou Teche campaign. He planned to frontally assault Major General Richard Taylor's Confederate force near Pattersonville while a flanking column under Brigadier General Cuvier Grover moved up the Atchafalaya River on transports to attack Taylor from the rear. On 11 April, Banks' column began moving and engaged in the Battle of Fort Bisland on 12–13 April.

The Confederates entrenched defense lines on the narrow strips of land on each side of Bayou Teche. On each bank of the bayou, the Confederates had 1,500 soldiers whose flanks were guarded by impassible swamps and canebrakes. Gooding led a brigade of five regiments that attacked the Confederate position on the east bank, while Brigadier Generals Godfrey Weitzel and Halbert E. Paine attacked on the west bank. Gooding's men were opposed by the 7th Texas Cavalry Regiment and Brigadier General Alfred Mouton's Louisiana brigade. On the morning of 13 April, Gooding was ordered to move to the east bank and take command of all the troops there. These were the 31st Massachusetts, 38th Massachusetts, 53rd Massachusetts, 156th New York, and the 175th New York Infantry Regiments, the 1st Maine Battery, and a detachment of Louisiana cavalry.

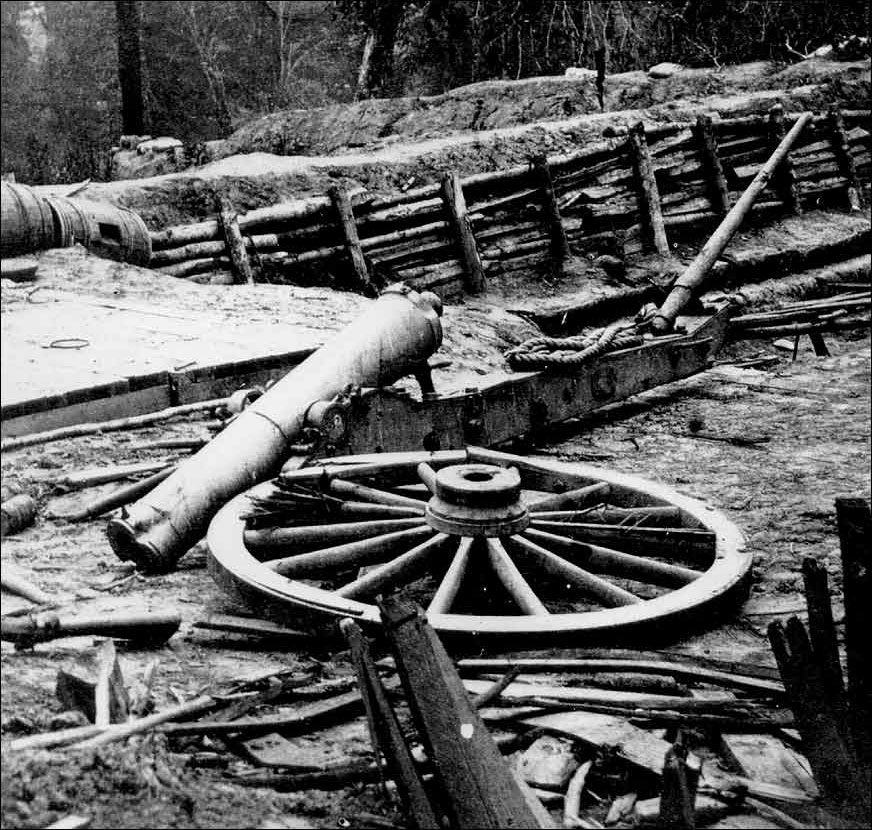
Disabled Confederate gun in the Port Hudson defenses.

Starting at 10:00 am on 13 April, Gooding's men cautiously pressed forward until they reached a position to launch an assault. The attack was never ordered because Grover's movement was slow to develop. When the Union soldiers mounted an attack on the morning of 14 April, they found the Confederates were gone. Losses were 31st Massachusetts (1 killed, 5 wounded), 38th Massachusetts (6 killed, 29 wounded), 53rd Massachusetts (3 killed, 9 wounded), 156th New York (4 killed, 18 wounded), 175th New York (1 killed, 6 wounded), 1st Maine Battery (2 wounded), 1st Louisiana Cavalry (3 wounded). Gooding claimed that the 156th New York overran a Confederate breastwork, capturing 86 men, and that his troops captured 130 Confederates altogether. On 17 April, Gooding's brigade was attached to Grover's division and was present at the Battle of Vermilion Bayou.

At the Siege of Port Hudson (22 May – 9 July 1863), Gooding commanded the 3rd Brigade in Paine's 3rd Division of the XIX Corps. The brigade included the 31st, 38th, and 53rd Massachusetts and the 156th New York. During the siege, the brigade's losses were 48 killed, 265 wounded, and 8 missing. Banks ordered an assault on 27 May, but it was a complete failure and cost 1,995 Union casualties. Banks' orders were not explicit, and one of his division commanders willfully disobeyed his instructions, so that the attacks were not simultaneous. Gooding's brigade was in reserve during the 27 May assault. Gooding's brigade participated in the 14 June assault. Advancing in the open, the soldiers met withering fire from the defenders and immediately went to ground, unable to get forward, and Paine was badly wounded. The failed 14 June assault cost the Union 1,792 casualties.

Gooding took a leave of absence, then commanded the District of Baton Rouge from 1 September to 19 October 1863. Afterward, he served on a military commission in Washington, D.C. until 27 January 1864.

=== 1864–1865 ===
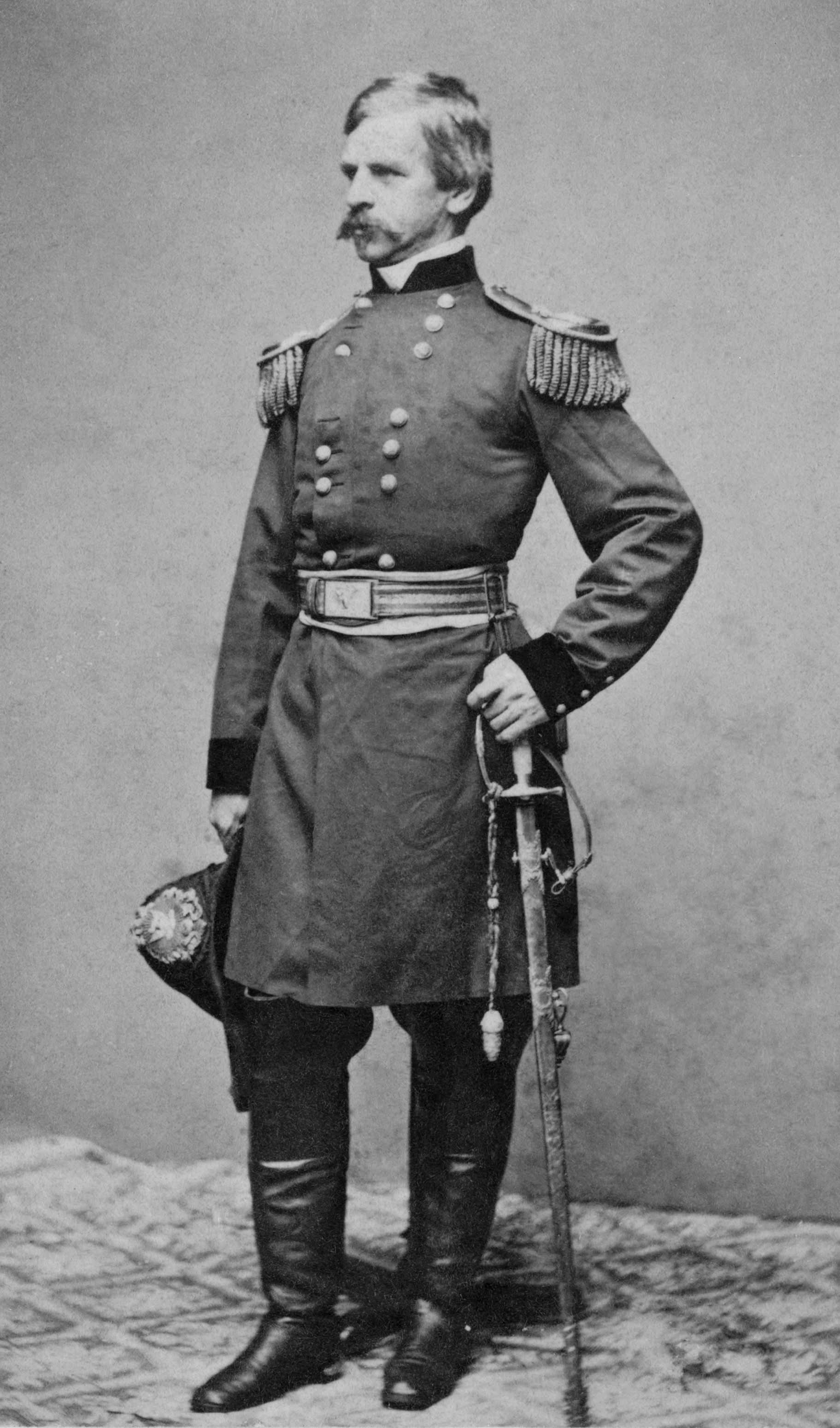
Nathaniel P. Banks

During the Red River campaign, Gooding led the 5th Brigade in Brigadier General Albert Lindley Lee's Cavalry Division, XIX Corps. The brigade consisted of the 18th New York Cavalry and 2nd New York Veteran Cavalry Regiments, and part of the 3rd Rhode Island Cavalry. At the beginning of April 1864, Banks' army occupied Natchitoches, Louisiana, and part of Gooding's brigade was sent on a reconnaissance to the opposite bank of the Red River. On 4 April, while Gooding's brigade was on the east bank of the Red River, Major General A. J. Smith ordered him to clear some of St. John Richardson Liddell's Confederates out of Campti. Gooding's troopers drove the Confederates out of the town, but needed assistance from the 5th Minnesota Infantry to drive them out of the area.

On 6 April, Gooding's brigade was switched to the west bank to protect the left flank and rear of Banks' army. The rest of Lee's cavalry was leading the march. On 8 April, Banks' army was routed at the Battle of Mansfield. Though the Union troops repulsed the Confederates at the Battle of Pleasant Hill on 9 April, Banks soon abandoned the campaign. A bullet grazed Gooding's scalp at Pleasant Hill. After the Actions near Alexandria, the Union army evacuated Alexandria on 13 May. Hearing that Union soldiers planned to burn down the town, a citizen asked Banks if it was true. The Union commander replied that Gooding had 500 men who were to protect the town against arsonists. When shown a note to that effect from Banks, Gooding professed complete ignorance of any such instructions and said, "This is just like old Banks."

Gooding briefly led a cavalry division from 5 June to 11 July 1864. Subsequently, he commanded a cavalry brigade from 23 September to 11 November 1864. He was mustered out of volunteer service on 26 November 1864 and was Inspecting Officer until his resignation on 20 March 1865. He was brevetted Brigadier General for Port Hudson and brevetted Major General for the Red River campaign on 13 March 1865.

== Later career ==
In fall 1865, Gooding moved to Washington, D.C. and resumed his study of the law. He was admitted to the Washington, D.C. bar on 6 January 1866 and practiced law there until 1869. He retired to Greenfield, Indiana, but in February 1874, he moved to St. Louis, where he resumed practicing law. In 1881, he was appointed General Attorney of the Insurance Department of Missouri. Historian Mark M. Boatner III stated that he was a police commissioner in St. Louis. He wrote two books, The People's God vs. the Monarchic God in 1892 and The People's Holy Bible in 1895. He died 9 September 1909 in Washington D.C.

== See also ==
- List of American Civil War brevet generals (Union)
