= M1841 6-pounder field gun =

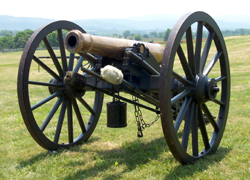
- M1841 6-pounder field gun at Antietam National Battlefield
- Type: Smoothbore cannon
- Place of origin: United States

Service history
- In service: 1841–1868
- Used by: United States
- Wars: Mexican–American War; American Civil War

Production history
- Manufacturer: Cyrus Alger & Co. N. P. Ames
- Produced: 1841
- No. built: over 1,100
- Variants: 1835, 1838, 1840

Specifications
- Mass: 880 lb (399.2 kg)
- Length: 60.0 in (152.4 cm)
- Crew: 9
- Shell weight: 6.1 lb (2.8 kg) shot 1.25 lb (0.6 kg) charge
- Caliber: 3.67 in (93 mm)
- Barrels: 1
- Action: Muzzle loading
- Carriage: 900 lb (408.2 kg)
- Muzzle velocity: 1,439 ft/s (439 m/s)
- Effective firing range: 1,523 yd (1,393 m)

The M1841 6-pounder field gun was a bronze smoothbore muzzleloading cannon that was adopted by the United States Army in 1841 and used from the Mexican–American War to the American Civil War. It fired a 6.1 lb (2.8 kg) round shot up to a distance of 1,523 yd (1,393 m) at 5° elevation. It could also fire canister shot and spherical case shot (shrapnel). The cannon proved very effective when employed by light artillery units during the Mexican–American War. The cannon was used during the early years of the American Civil War, but it was soon outclassed by newer field guns such as the M1857 12-pounder Napoleon. In the U.S. Army, the 6-pounders were replaced as soon as more modern weapons became available and none were manufactured after 1862. However, the Confederate States Army continued to use the cannon for a longer period because the lesser industrial capacity of the South could not produce new guns as fast as the North.

== Background ==
By the early 1800s gun-founders knew that two metals were suitable for the manufacture of cannon, iron and bronze. Bronze, an alloy made up of about 90% copper and 10% tin, was strong enough to resist the explosion of gunpowder without bursting the cannon. The guns were often referred to as brass cannons when in fact their composition was of bronze. The weakness of bronze guns was that, if fired too rapidly, they overheated and warped. Iron cannons did not warp and were much cheaper to manufacture. However, cast iron was more brittle than bronze. Iron cannons were heavier than bronze guns; this was not a problem with large caliber weapons aboard ships or in fortresses, but field artillery pieces needed to be lighter and more mobile.

Before a cannon was accepted into service, it was subjected to proof testing in order to determine if the piece met the desired specifications and was safe to fire. First, the gun was weighed and measured. Second, the gun was fired; if it burst, then the entire batch was given extra scrutiny. Typically, a proofing charge used approximately twice the weight of gunpowder as a normal firing charge. Third, the inside of the bore was probed with a special instrument to make sure there were no cracks or gaps. Fourth, the vent was stopped up and water was forced into the bore; if water leaked out the cannon was rejected. Fifth, a mirror was inserted into the bore for a final inspection.

From 1820 to 1840, American cannon founders made cast iron 6-pounders that were less reliable than guns used in the War of 1812. In 1824, the Fort Pitt Foundry delivered 74 cast-iron 6-pounder guns out of an order of 100. A second order of 100 cast-iron 6-pounders was delivered in 1828–1830 and at least 10 were rejected. Finally, 113 cast-iron 6-pounders were manufactured in 1836–1838 and 22 were rejected. No more orders were placed with the Fort Pitt Foundry. In 1833, the Columbia Foundry produced two cast-iron 6-pounders of which one burst during proof. They delivered 43 cast-iron 6-pounders in 1834–1836 but these were the last ones produced by the Columbia Foundry. In 1840, an exasperated Secretary of War Joel Roberts Poinsett wrote, "...if guns sometimes fail, it is not because the gun is of iron, but because the founder is not perfect in his art. At present, he makes a good gun by accident, whereas it is by accident only that he should make a bad one." The problem was finally discovered in 1847. During the period 1835–1839, American cannon founders switched from cold blast to hot blast cast iron for reasons of economy and convenience; this led to cast-iron guns being more prone to failure.

== Model 1841 and its variants ==
In 1835, the U.S. Army Ordnance Board meeting in Watervliet, New York decided to switch to bronze field guns. In July 1836, two established bronze foundries, Cyrus Alger & Company of Boston and N. P. Ames of Cabotville, Massachusetts were hired to manufacture bronze 6-pounder guns. Alger produced 26 and Ames produced 32 bronze Model 1835 6-pounder guns. The Model 1838 bronze 6-pounder was a lighter cannon designed for horse artillery units. Alger delivered 62 and Ames delivered 36 of the Model 1838 gun. Ames also manufactured 27 Model 1840 bronze 6-pounders, which were heavier than the Model 1838.

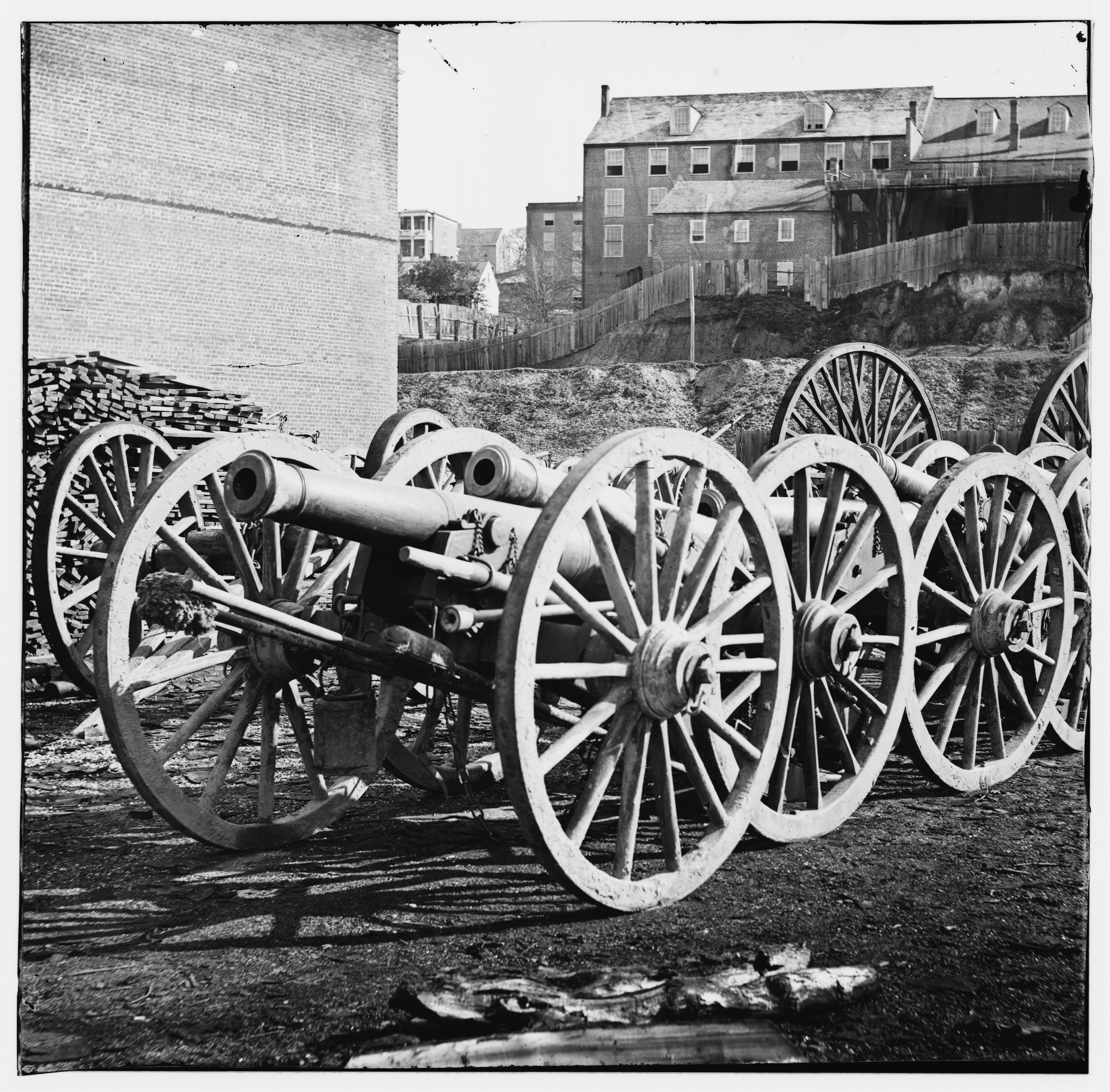
M1841 6-pounder field guns

The Model 1841 bronze 6-pounder cannon proved to be the most successful. The gun was not officially discarded by the US Army until 1868 though none were produced after 1862. Ames manufactured at least 646 Model 1841 guns and Alger produced at least 337. Of the latter group, 10 were so-called Cadet guns which weighed only 570 lb (258.5 kg). There were no recorded losses during proofing, though some of the guns varied as much as 10 lb (4.5 kg) from the official weight. Four of the Cadet guns were produced for the Virginia Military Institute, two for the Arkansas Military Institute, and four for the Georgia Military Institute. The first Model 1841 Ames guns were accepted in October 1841 and the first Alger guns were accepted in November 1841.

The M1841 6-pounder was designed as a smoothbore gun, and only later were some 6-pounders converted to rifled guns. The Eagle Foundry of Miles Greenwood of Cincinnati delivered 97 bronze 6-pounders of which 43 were rifled between August 1861 and December 1862. The Western Foundry of William D. Marshall & Company of St. Louis manufactured 33 bronze 6-pounders of which six were rifled between December 1861 and May 1862. Henry N. Hooper & Company of Boston produced eight bronze 6-pounders and Revere Copper Company of Boston delivered two similar guns in February 1862.

Model 1841 bronze 6-pounder cannon and variants (Note: The "854+" figure for the Model 1841 was given in a table published in Hazlett, Olmstead & Parks. It is not clear how this number was calculated. If the numbers of Model 1841 produced by Ames (646), Alger (337), Greenwood (97), Marshall (33), Hooper (8), and Revere (2) are added up, the sum is 1,123.)
Description	No. Accepted	Base ring diameter	Length w/o knob	Bore length	Bore len. in calibers	Weight of barrel
Model 1835	58	9.8 in (24.9 cm)	60 in (152.4 cm)	57.5 in (146.1 cm)	15.7	743 lb (337.0 kg)
Model 1838	98	9.8 in (24.9 cm)	53.75 in (136.5 cm)	51.25 in (130.2 cm)	14.0	690 lb (313.0 kg)
Model 1840	27	10.3 in (26.2 cm)	53.75 in (136.5 cm)	51.25 in (130.2 cm)	14.0	812 lb (368.3 kg)
Model 1841	854+	10.3 in (26.2 cm)	60 in (152.4 cm)	57.5 in (146.1 cm)	15.7	880 lb (399.2 kg)
Cadet guns	10	9.53 in (24.2 cm)	46 in (116.8 cm)	43 in (109.2 cm)	11.7	570 lb (258.5 kg)

== Specifications ==
The Model 1841 bronze 6-pounder gun barrel was 60 in (152.4 cm) from the base ring to the muzzle and weighed 880 lb (399.2 kg). The diameter of the bore (caliber) was 3.67 in (9.32 cm) and the bore length was 57.5 in (146.1 cm). This means the bore was 15.67 calibers long. The cannon fired a 6.1 lb (2.8 kg) round shot of 3.58 in (9.1 cm) diameter. The spherical case shot weighed 5.7 lb (2.6 kg) and released 41 musket balls when it burst. The canister round weighed 7.32 lb (3.3 kg) and contained 27 iron balls. At 5° elevation, the gun could hurl the round shot a distance of 1,523 yd (1,392.6 m) with the standard firing charge of 1.25 lb (0.6 kg). At 4° elevation, the gun could throw the spherical case shot a distance of 1,200 yd (1,097.3 m). Canister shot was effective up to a distance of 350 yd (320 m). The muzzle velocity was 1,439 ft/s (439 m/s).

Side elevation of a typical 19th-century cannon

A 6-pounder battery typically included four 6-pounder field guns and two M1841 12-pounder howitzers. Altogether, the battery required fourteen 6-horse teams and seven spare horses. The teams pulled the six artillery pieces and limbers, six limbers and caissons, one battery wagon, and one traveling forge. Each caisson weighed 3,800 lb (1,724 kg) and carried two ammunition chests, each with 50 rounds. Each of the two limbers also carried one, so that each gun was supplied with four ammunition chests. The carriage for the 6-pounder gun weighed 900 lb (408 kg). A 6-pounder cannon and its limber weighed 3,185 lb (1,445 kg) when fully loaded with one 50-round ammunition chest. The 1864 U.S. Field Artillery Instructions recommended that each ammunition chest contain 25 round shot, 20 spherical case shot, and 5 canister rounds. Nine men manned each cannon, the gunner who commanded the gun and eight artillerists who were numbered according to their function. Of these, numbers 1 and 2 placed the round in the muzzle and rammed it home.

Model 1841 bronze 6-pounder cannon specifications
Description	Dimension
Weight of the gun barrel	880 lb (399.2 kg)
Diameter of the bore (caliber)	3.67 in (9.32 cm)
Length of the bore	57.5 in (146.1 cm)
Length of the bore in calibers	15.7
Length from the rear of the base ring to the face of the muzzle	60 in (152.4 cm)
Length from the rear of the knob to the face of the muzzle	65.6 in (166.6 cm)
Length from the rear of the base ring to the end of the (second) reinforce	30 in (76.2 cm)
Length of the chase from the end of the reinforce to the rear of the astragal	22 in (55.9 cm)
Length from the rear of the astragal to the face of the muzzle	8 in (20.3 cm)
Length from the rear of the base ring to the rear of the trunnions	23.25 in (59.1 cm)
Diameter of the base ring	10.3 in (26.2 cm)
Thickness of metal at the vent	3.03 in (7.7 cm)
Thickness of metal at the end of the (second) reinforce	2.415 in (6.1 cm)
Thickness of metal at the end of the chase (astragal)	1.415 in (3.6 cm)

== History ==
=== Mexican War ===
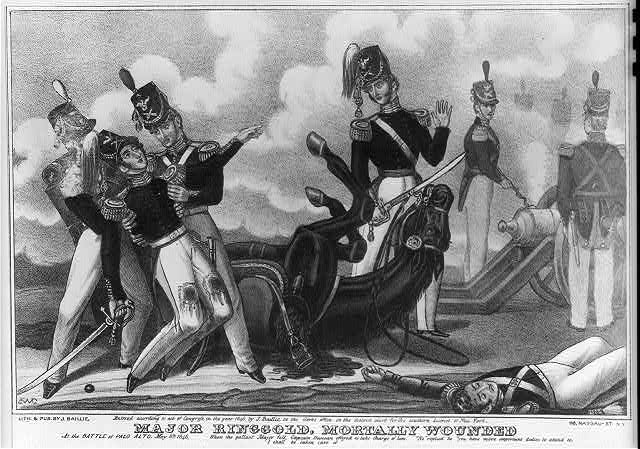
Major Ringgold was fatally wounded while leading a 6-pounder battery at Palo Alto.

The American bronze 6-pounder field guns saw action at the Battle of Palo Alto on 8 May 1846 during the Mexican–American War. General Zachary Taylor led a force numbering 2,228 troops that included two 18-pounder heavy cannons and two 4-gun light batteries under Major Samuel Ringgold and Captain James Duncan. They were opposed by General Mariano Arista with 365 officers, 3,461 rank and file, eight 4-pounder and two 8-pounder cannons. The action became largely an artillery duel where the American guns proved to be superior. American losses were five killed, 43 wounded, and two missing. However, 10 more soon died of their wounds, including Ringgold who was struck in both knees by a 4-pounder round shot. Arista verbally admitted losing 252 killed but wrote only 102 killed in his official report. The next morning, the Mexican army withdrew to a second position, but it was defeated that day at the Battle of Resaca de la Palma.

At Palo Alto, both Ringgold's and Duncan's batteries maneuvered rapidly and inflicted severe casualties in the Mexican ranks. At the start of the action they deployed 100 yd (91 m) in front of the American infantry. Near the end of the action, under the cover of smoke, Duncan's battery unlimbered 300 yd (274 m) from its opponents and caused the Mexican right flank to pull back. Both Ringgold's and Duncan's batteries were armed with bronze 6-pounder field guns. However, archeological evidence indicates that one or more 12-pounder howitzers may have been used also. The Mexicans employed old French Gribeauval system cannons but they were still effective weapons. However, the inferior Mexican gunpowder caused many rounds to fall short. The Mexican artillery drivers were hired civilians, so that their cannons were much less mobile than those of the well-trained American drivers.

=== Civil War ===
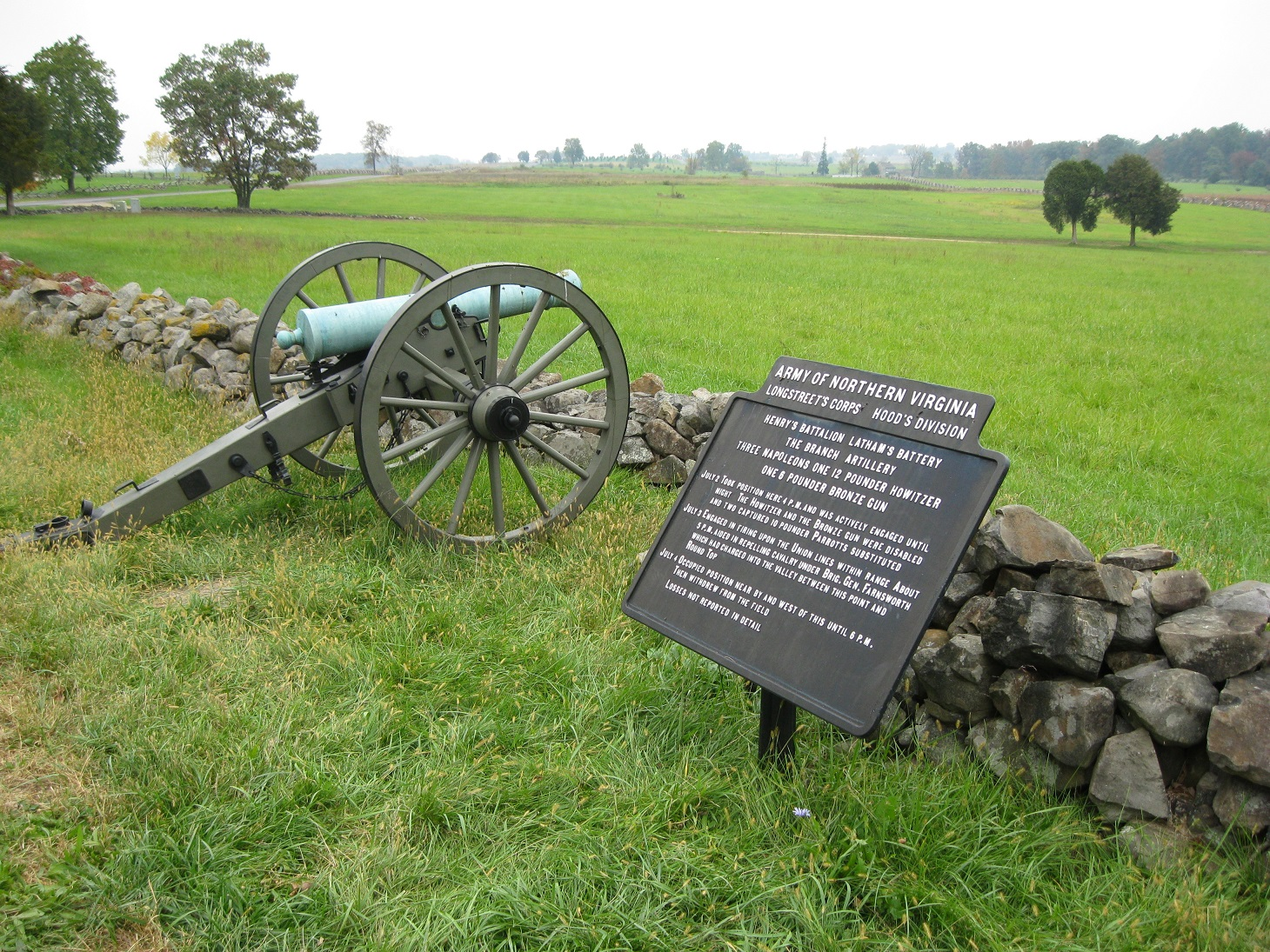
M1841 6-pounder field gun stands at Gettysburg National Military Park. The sign indicates that Latham's Confederate Battery was armed with one 6-pounder, one 12-pounder howitzer, and three 12-pounder Napoleons.

The M1841 bronze 6-pounder cannon proved to be a highly effective weapon during the Mexican–American War. However, American Civil War combat experience soon showed that bronze smoothbore 6-pounder field guns were no longer effective weapons. When George B. McClellan became commander of the Union Army of the Potomac he ordered, with only a few exceptions, that all of the Model 1841 smoothbore guns be replaced by M1857 12-pounder Napoleons, 3-inch Ordnance rifles, and Parrott rifles. The Model 1841 guns were replaced in the eastern armies first and surviving records show a westward migration of the older model guns to the western armies where they persisted for a longer period of time. This is shown by the 30 June 1863 inventories of two western departments. The Department of the Cumberland reported having 24 smoothbore 6-pounders out of a total of 220 field artillery pieces, while the Department of the Ohio had eight smoothbore 6-pounders out of a total of 72 pieces. Rifling was added to bronze 6-pounders, but this experiment was not successful because bronze wore out more easily than iron. The rifling eroded rapidly, rendering the guns inaccurate.

During the Battle of Pea Ridge in the far west Trans-Mississippi theater on 7–8 March 1862, both armies still employed significant numbers of smoothbore and rifled 6-pounder field guns. In the Union army, three units were armed with four 6-pounder smoothbores and two 12-pounder howitzers: the 2nd Ohio Battery, 1st Iowa Independent Battery Light Artillery, and 3rd Iowa Independent Battery Light Artillery. The 4th Ohio Battery had four rifled 6-pounders and two 12-pounder howitzers. The 1st Independent Battery Indiana Light Artillery had four rifled and two smoothbore 6-pounder field guns. Battery A, 2nd Illinois Light Artillery Regiment had two rifled and two smoothbore 6-pounder field guns and two 12-pounder howitzers. In the Confederate army, Clark's, Jackson's, and Gorham's Missouri batteries and Hart's Arkansas Battery each had four 6-pounder smoothbores. Mixed batteries with two 6-pounder smoothbores included Provence's Arkansas Battery and Wade's Missouri Battery and two more batteries.

Approximately 127 bronze 6-pounder guns were manufactured in the Confederacy. Because the South lacked the North's industrial capacity, the 6-pounders were employed by Confederate armies for a longer period. At the Battle of Antietam on 17 September 1862, there were at least 41 smoothbore 6-pounder guns still being used in Robert E. Lee's Confederate Army of Northern Virginia, while the Union Army of the Potomac no longer had any 6-pounders. For example, the 4th Company, Washington Artillery (Eshleman's) was equipped with two 6-pounders and two 12-pounder howitzers. On 13 November 1862, the Confederate Chief of Ordnance Josiah Gorgas issued an order that the only bronze guns to be manufactured must be 12-pounder Napoleons. In early 1863, Lee sent his army's Model 1841 bronze 6-pounder guns to be melted down and recast into 12-pounder Napoleons. At the Battle of Brice's Cross Roads the Confederates used canister in this old weapon to deadly effect.

== Civil War artillery ==
Characteristics of American Civil War artillery pieces
Description	Caliber	Tube length	Tube weight	Carriage weight	Shot weight	Charge weight	Range 5° elev.
M1841 6-pounder cannon	3.67 in (9.3 cm)	60 in (152.4 cm)	884 lb (401 kg)	900 lb (408 kg)	6.1 lb (2.8 kg)	1.25 lb (0.6 kg)	1,523 yd (1,393 m)
M1841 12-pounder cannon	4.62 in (11.7 cm)	78 in (198.1 cm)	1,757 lb (797 kg)	1,175 lb (533 kg)	12.3 lb (5.6 kg)	2.5 lb (1.1 kg)	1,663 yd (1,521 m)
M1841 12-pounder howitzer	4.62 in (11.7 cm)	53 in (134.6 cm)	788 lb (357 kg)	900 lb (408 kg)	8.9 lb (4.0 kg)	1.0 lb (0.5 kg)	1,072 yd (980 m)
M1841 24-pounder howitzer	5.82 in (14.8 cm)	65 in (165.1 cm)	1,318 lb (598 kg)	1,128 lb (512 kg)	18.4 lb (8.3 kg)	2.0 lb (0.9 kg)	1,322 yd (1,209 m)
M1857 12-pounder Napoleon	4.62 in (11.7 cm)	66 in (167.6 cm)	1,227 lb (557 kg)	1,128 lb (512 kg)	12.3 lb (5.6 kg)	2.5 lb (1.1 kg)	1,619 yd (1,480 m)
12-pounder James rifle	3.67 in (9.3 cm)	60 in (152.4 cm)	875 lb (397 kg)	900 lb (408 kg)	12 lb (5.4 kg)	0.75 lb (0.3 kg)	1,700 yd (1,554 m)
3-inch Ordnance rifle	3.0 in (7.6 cm)	69 in (175.3 cm)	820 lb (372 kg)	900 lb (408 kg)	9.5 lb (4.3 kg)	1.0 lb (0.5 kg)	1,830 yd (1,673 m)
10-pounder Parrott rifle	3.0 in (7.6 cm)	74 in (188.0 cm)	899 lb (408 kg)	900 lb (408 kg)	9.5 lb (4.3 kg)	1.0 lb (0.5 kg)	1,900 yd (1,737 m)
20-pounder Parrott rifle	3.67 in (9.3 cm)	84 in (213.4 cm)	1,750 lb (794 kg)	1,175 lb (533 kg)	20 lb (9.1 kg)	2.0 lb (0.9 kg)	1,900 yd (1,737 m)

== See also ==
- 14-pounder James rifle

== Notes ==
Footnotes

Citations
