= John McNulta =

American politician

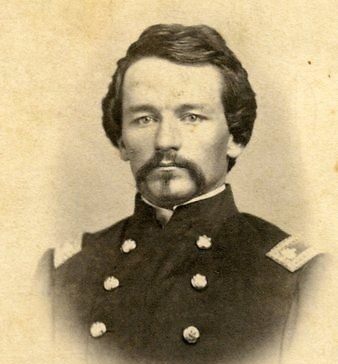
- McLean County Historical Society, Bloomington, Illinois

Member of the U.S. House of Representatives from Illinois's 13th district
- In office March 4, 1873 – March 3, 1875
- Preceded by: John M. Crebs
- Succeeded by: Adlai Stevenson I

Personal details
- Born: November 9, 1837 New York, New York, U.S.
- Died: February 22, 1900 (aged 62) Washington, D.C., U.S.
- Occupation: Lawyer
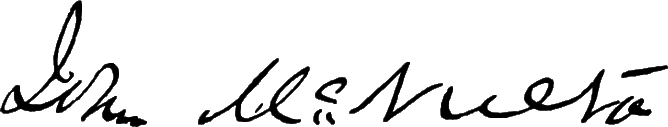
- Signature

John McNulta (November 9, 1837 – February 22, 1900) was a U.S. representative from Illinois.

== Biography ==
Born in New York City, McNulta pursued an academic course and visited the West Indies and Europe. He moved to Attica, Indiana, in 1853 and to Bloomington, Illinois, in 1859. At one point, he engaged in the manufacture of cigars. During the Civil War, McNulta served in the Union Army with the 1st Regiment Illinois Volunteer Cavalry and the 94th Illinois Volunteer Infantry Regiment.

He studied law and was admitted to the bar in 1865 and commenced the practice of law in Bloomington, Illinois. He served as member of the State senate 1869–1873.

McNulta was elected as a Republican to the Forty-third Congress (March 4, 1873 – March 3, 1875). He was an unsuccessful candidate for reelection in 1874 to the Forty-fourth Congress. McNulta later resumed his legal practice. He died in Washington, D.C., on February 22, 1900, and is interred in Evergreen Cemetery, Bloomington, Illinois.

U.S. House of Representatives
Preceded by John M. Crebs	Member of the U.S. House of Representatives from Illinois's 13th congressional district March 4, 1873 – March 3, 1875	Succeeded by Adlai Stevenson I
