= 31st Massachusetts Infantry Regiment =

31st Massachusetts Volunteer Infantry
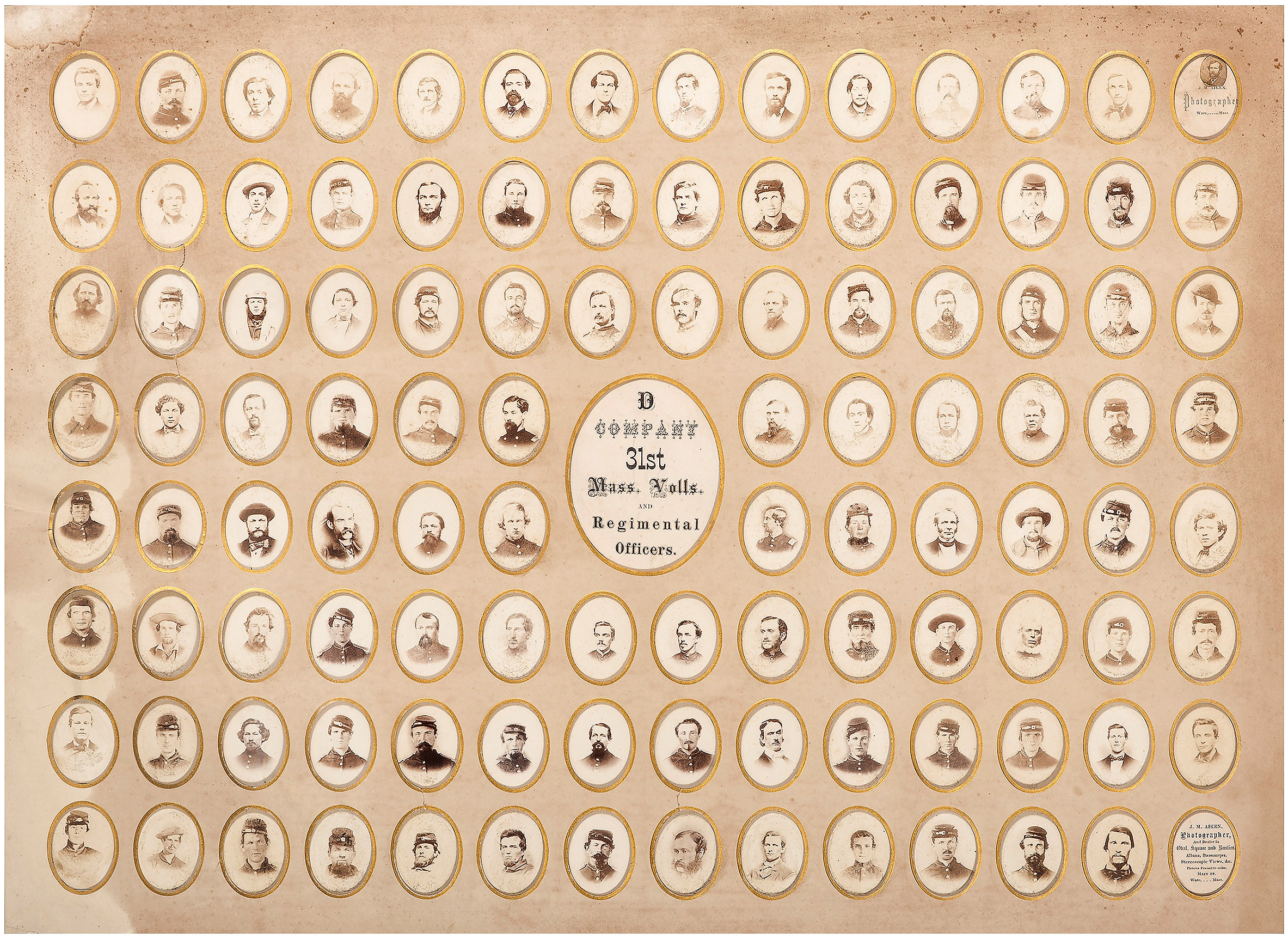
- Company D composite image
- Active: November 20, 1861 – September 30, 1865
- Country: United States
- Allegiance: Union
- Branch: Infantry & Mounted Infantry
- Engagements: Battle of Port Hudson; Bayou Teche Campaign; Battle of Fort Blakeley

The 31st Massachusetts was an infantry regiment that served in the Union Army during the American Civil War. It was converted into a mounted infantry regiment in December 1863.

== Service ==
The 31st Massachusetts was initially organized by Colonel Benjamin Butler beginning November 20, 1861 in Pittsfield, Massachusetts as the "Western Bay State Regiment". The regiment moved to Boston on February 19, 1862, where it mustered in for a three-year enlistment on February 20, 1862, under the command of Colonel Oliver P. Gooding.

The regiment was attached to 2nd Brigade, Department of the Gulf, to October 1862. Sherman's Division, Department of the Gulf, to January 1863. 3rd Brigade, 3rd Division, XIX Corps, Department of the Gulf, to July 1862. 2nd Brigade, 1st Division, XIX Corps, Department of the Gulf, to December 1863. 4th Brigade, Cavalry Division, Department of the Gulf, to June 1864. Defenses of New Orleans to September 1864. 1st Brigade, Cavalry Division, Department of the Gulf, to October 1864. Defenses of New Orleans to March 1865. 1st Brigade, Lucas' Cavalry Division, Steele's Command, Military Division West Mississippi, to April 1865. District of Mobile, Alabama, to September 1865.

The 31st Massachusetts mustered out of service on September 9, 1865. The regiment moved to Boston and was discharged on September 30, 1865.

== Detailed service ==
Duty at Camp Chase in Lowell, until February 1862. Moved to Boston February 19, then sailed on the steamer Mississippi for Ship Island, Miss. Detained at Hilton Head, S.C., repairing vessel, March 1–13. Arrived at Ship Island March 23, and duty there until April 18. Operations against Forts St. Phillip and Jackson, Mississippi River, April 18–28, 1862. Moved to New Orleans April 29–30. Occupation of New Orleans May 1. (The first Union regiment to enter city.) Provost duty at New Orleans until August. Garrison duty at Forts St. Phillip and Jackson until January 1863. (Three companies at Fort Pike until September 1863. Rejoined the regiment September 9.) Skirmish at Bayou Bontecou November 21, 1862, and Deserted Station December 10. Moved to Carrollton January 1863, and duty there until March 6. Moved to Baton Rouge March 6–7. Expedition to Port Hudson March 7–27. Moved to Algiers April 1, then to Berwick City April 9. Operations in western Louisiana April 9-May 14. Bayou Teche Campaign April 11–20. Fort Bisland April 12–13. March from Opelousas to Alexandria and Simsport May 5–18. Moved to Bayou Sara, then to Port Hudson May 22–25. Siege of Port Hudson May 25-July 9. Skirmish at Thompson's Creek May 25 (detachment). Assaults on Port Hudson May 27 and June 14. Expedition to Clinton June 3–8. Surrender of Port Hudson July 9. Moved to Baton Rouge July 11, then to Donaldsonville July 15-August 1. Moved to Baton Rouge September 1 and duty there until December 9. Moved to New Orleans December 9 and there converted into a mounted infantry regiment. Bonfonca November 26. Duty at Carrollton until February 29, 1864. March to Berwick Bay and Brashear City February 29-March 9. Red River Campaign March 10-May 22. Advance to Alexandria March 11–26. Bayou Rapides March 20. Monett's Ferry and Cloutiersville March 29–30. Natchitoches March 31. Crump's Hill, Piney Woods, April 2. Wilson's Farm April 7. Bayou de Paul, Carroll's Mill and Sabine Cross Roads April 8. Pleasant Hill April 9. Monett's Bluff, Cane River Crossing, April 23. Hudnot's Plantation May 1. Near Alexandria May 2–9. Retreat to Morganza May 13–20. Near Alexandria May 14. Mansura May 16. Near Moreauville May 17. Yellow Bayou May 18. At Morganza until July 3. Expedition to the Atchafalaya May 30-June 6. Expedition to Tunica Bend June 19–21. Moved to New Orleans July 3. Veterans absent on furlough July 21 to September 19. Non-veterans guarded prisoners at New Orleans until September. Duty in the defenses of New Orleans until March 1865. Non-veterans mustered out November 19, 1864. Ordered to Donaldsonville November 27, and operated against guerrillas until February 1865. Operations near Hermitage Plantation December 14, 1864 to January 5, 1865. Expedition from Plaquemine to the Park January 26 to February 4 (detachment). Skirmish at the Park February 4 (detachment). Consolidated to a battalion of five companies. Ordered to Carrollton February 9, 1865, then moved to Barrancas, Fla., March 6–9. Marched to Fort Blakely, Mobile Bay, March 20-April 1. Siege of Fort Blakely April 1–9. Occupation of Mobile April 12 and duty there until September.

== Casualties ==
The regiment lost a total of 205 men during service; 52 enlisted men killed or mortally wounded, 3 officers and 150 enlisted men died of disease.

== Commanders ==
- Colonel Oliver Paul Gooding

== See also ==
- List of Massachusetts Civil War Units
- Massachusetts in the American Civil War
