= 87th Illinois Infantry Regiment =

87th Regiment Illinois Volunteer Infantry
- Illinois state flag
- Active: October 3, 1862, to June 16, 1865
- Country: United States
- Allegiance: Union
- Branch: Infantry; Mounted infantry
- Equipment: Siege of Vicksburg; Battle of Wauhatchie; Battle of Missionary Ridge; Battle of Resaca; March to the Sea; Battle of Bentonville

The 87th Regiment Illinois Volunteer Infantry, later the 87th Regiment Illinois Volunteer Mounted Infantry, was an infantry regiment that served in the Union Army during the American Civil War.

== Service ==
The 87th Illinois Infantry was organized at Shawneetown, Illinois and mustered into Federal service on October 3, 1862. It was mounted in November, 1863.

The regiment was mustered out on June 16, 1865.

== Total strength and casualties ==
The regiment suffered 1 officer and 15 enlisted men who were killed in action or who died of their wounds and 3 officers and 219 enlisted men who died of disease, for a total of 238 fatalities.

== Commanders ==
- Colonel John E. Whiting - resigned October 8, 1863
- Lieutenant Colonel John M. Crebs - Mustered out with the regiment.

== See also ==
- List of Illinois Civil War Units
- Illinois in the American Civil War
