= John M. Crebs =

American politician

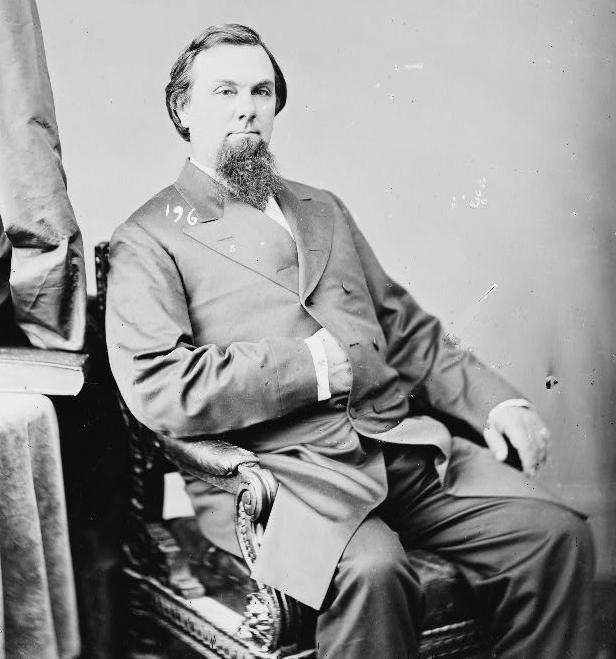

Member of the U.S. House of Representatives from Illinois's 13th district
- In office March 4, 1869 – March 3, 1873
- Preceded by: Green Berry Raum
- Succeeded by: John McNulta

Personal details
- Born: April 9, 1830 Middleburg, Virginia, U.S.
- Died: June 26, 1890 (aged 60) Carmi, Illinois, U.S.
- Party: Democratic

John Montgomery Crebs (April 9, 1830 – June 26, 1890) was a U.S. Representative from Illinois, as well as an officer and brigade commander in the Union Army during the American Civil War.

== Biography ==
Born in Middleburg, Virginia, Crebs moved to Illinois in 1837 with his parents, who settled in White County. He attended the public schools and subsequently studied law. He was admitted to the bar in 1852 and commenced practice in White County.

Following the outbreak of the Civil War, Crebs was commissioned as the lieutenant colonel of the 87th Illinois Infantry in 1862. He took part in several leading campaigns and battles in the Western Theater, including the Siege of Corinth, Mississippi, in early 1862 and the Vicksburg Campaign the following year. He was also a part of the Union effort to take control of Arkansas late in 1864. He subsequently commanded a brigade of cavalry in the Department of the Gulf until the end of the war.

After the close of the war, Crebs resigned his commission and returned to White County, where he resumed the practice of law. He was elected as a Democrat to the Forty-first and Forty-second Congresses (March 4, 1869 – March 3, 1873), defeating incumbent and fellow former Civil War officer Green Raum in the 1868 election. He was an unsuccessful candidate for renomination in 1872.

Crebs engaged in the practice of his profession until his death in Carmi, Illinois, on June 26, 1890. He was interred in Maple Ridge Cemetery.

U.S. House of Representatives
| Preceded by Green Raum | Member of the U.S. House of Representatives from Illinois's 13th congressional district March 4, 1869-March 3, 1873 | Succeeded by John McNulta |
