= Morgan Henry Chrysler =

American soldier

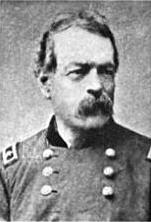
- Morgan H. Chrysler
- Born: September 30, 1822; Ghent, New York
- Died: August 24, 1890 (aged 67); Kinderhook, New York
- Burial place: Prospect Hill Cemetery, Valatie, New York
- Military career
- Allegiance: United States of America; Union
- Branch: United States Army; Union Army
- Service years: 1861–1866
- Rank: Brevet Major General
- Conflicts: American Civil War

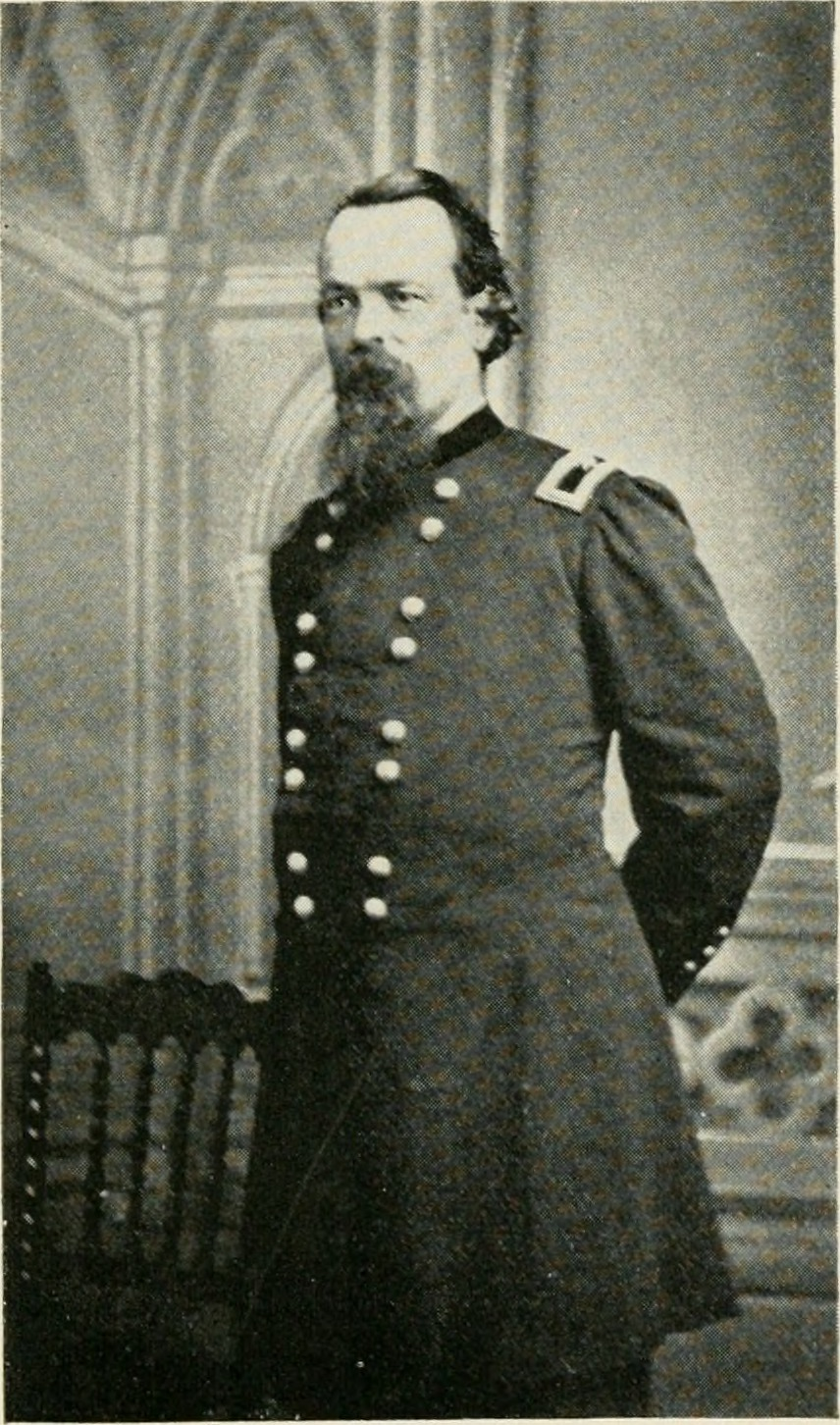
Gen. Morgan H. Chrysler

Morgan Henry Chrysler (September 30, 1822 – August 24, 1890) was an American soldier who served as a Union Army general during the American Civil War.

== Early life ==
Chrysler was born at Ghent, Columbia County, New York. He received a normal school education in his native town. He was involved in farming nearly all his life.

== Civil War service ==
When the American Civil War began in 1861, Chrysler chose to support the Union. He entered federal service as a private for a company that later joined the 30th New York Infantry. He was appointed captain of the 30th New York on June 1, 1861. He became major on March 11, 1862; lieutenant colonel on August 30, 1863; and colonel of a regiment of cavalry on December 13, 1863.

Chrysler served in the Peninsula Campaign, the Second Battle of Bull Run, the Battle of Antietam, and the Battle of Chancellorsville. He and the regiment were mustered out after the battle of Chancellorsville because their term of service had expired. He was instantly granted the authority to reorganize the discharged men into a cavalry regiment. In fifty-five days, he raised the 2nd New York veteran cavalry, which consisted of 1,176 men. He and his regiment were briefly stationed at Washington during the winter of 1863–64, before they were sent to New Orleans, Louisiana, to join the Department of the Gulf. Chrysler's regiment participated in the Red River Campaign, and led a brigade of cavalry as the advance guard of Lawler's Division to secure a crossing on the Atchafalaya River used by Confederate forces to threaten the Union camp at Morganza, Louisiana. They did their remaining service in the lower South. Chrysler commanded a brigade in Thomas John Lucas's division during the final campaign against Mobile in 1865.

Chrysler was appointed a brevet major general on March 13, 1865. He was one of only four men who rose from private to major general during the Civil War.

He became military governor of the District of Northern Alabama for a short period of time before he was mustered out in 1866.

== Postbellum ==
Following the war, Chrysler led a private life. He died at Kinderhook, New York, and was interred at Valatie, New York.

== See also ==
- List of American Civil War generals (Union)
