= 67th Indiana Infantry Regiment =

67th Regiment Indiana Infantry
- Active: August 20, 1862 – December 21, 1864
- Country: United States
- Allegiance: Union
- Branch: Infantry
- Engagements: Battle of Munfordville; Yazoo Pass Expedition; Battle of Chickasaw Bayou; Battle of Arkansas Post; Battle of Port Gibson; Battle of Champion Hill; Battle of Big Black River Bridge; Siege of Vicksburg, May 19 & May 22 assaults Bayou Teche Campaign; Red River Campaign; Battle of Sabine Crossroads; Siege of Fort Gaines; Siege of Fort Morgan

The 67th Regiment Indiana Infantry was an infantry regiment that served in the Union Army during the American Civil War.

== Service ==
The 67th Indiana Infantry was organized at Madison, Indiana and mustered in for a three-year enlistment on August 20, 1862, under the command of Colonel Frank Emerson.

The regiment was attached to 1st Brigade, 2nd Division, Army of Kentucky, Department of the Ohio. 1st Brigade, 10th Division, Right Wing, XIII Corps, Department of the Tennessee, December 1862. 1st Brigade, 1st Division, Sherman's Yazoo Expedition, to January 1863. 1st Brigade, 10th Division, XIII Corps, Army of the Tennessee, to August 1863. 1st Brigade, 4th Division, XIII Corps, Department of the Gulf, to June 1864. 3rd Brigade, 3rd Division, XIX Corps, Department of the Gulf, to December 1864. 2nd Brigade, Reserve Division, Military Division West Mississippi, December 1864.

The 67th Indiana Infantry ceased to exist on December 21, 1864, when it was consolidated with the 24th Indiana Infantry.

== Casualties ==
The regiment lost a total of 249 men during service; 1 officer and 52 enlisted men killed or mortally wounded, 2 officers and 194 enlisted men died of disease.

== Commanders ==
- Colonel Frank Emerson
- Lieutenant Colonel Theodore E. Buehler - commanded at the battle of Champion Hill and during the siege of Vicksburg

== See also ==
- List of Indiana Civil War regiments
- Indiana in the Civil War
