= 7th Massachusetts Battery =

- Active: March 17, 1862 – November 10, 1865
- Country: United States
- Branch: Union Army
- Type: Field artillery
- Size: Battery
- Engagements: American Civil War

Commanders
- 1st: Captain Phineas A. Davis
- 2nd: Capt. Newman W. Storer

The 7th Massachusetts Battery (or 7th Battery Massachusetts Light Artillery) was an artillery battery that served in the Union Army during the American Civil War. The original core of the unit was a company of infantry known as the Richardson Light Guard. The company initially served provost duty at Fortress Monroe, was eventually trained in light artillery drill, and reorganized on March 17, 1862 as the 7th Massachusetts Battery.

The battery served in a geographically diverse variety of military departments and campaigns. In 1862 and 1863, they served in the Department of Virginia and North Carolina primarily in operations in the vicinity of Suffolk, Virginia and saw combat in several engagements there including the Battle of Deserted House. Later in 1863, the 7th Massachusetts Battery served on the Virginia Peninsula during a demonstration against Richmond, in New York City in the wake of the draft riots, and later in the defenses of Washington. In January 1864, the battery was transferred to the Department of the Gulf and took part in operations in Louisiana. Later in 1864 the battery moved to Arkansas as part of the Army of West Mississippi. In 1865, the battery took part in the Mobile Campaign and saw action during the Battle of Fort Blakeley. After the Confederate surrender, the battery was deployed to Houston, Texas where they performed various details over the summer of 1865. In October, the unit began its journey back to Massachusetts and was mustered out in Boston on November 10, 1865.

== Organization and early service ==
The Richardson Light Guard was recruited in Lowell, Massachusetts in April immediately after the Battle of Fort Sumter and the start of the war. It was mustered in for a three-year term of service on May 21, 1861 and departed Boston for Fortress Monroe, Virginia the following day. The company was originally to be attached to the 3rd Massachusetts Volunteer Militia Regiment but instead was assigned to provost duty at Fortress Monroe and remained an unattached company. It remained on this duty until December 25 when they were assigned to light artillery drill. On March 17, 1862, it was officially reorganized by the War Department as the 7th Massachusetts Battery. During the summer of 1862, the battery was stationed at Norfolk and later Yorktown, Virginia. It was transferred to Suffolk, Virginia on September 29.

== Southeastern Virginia ==
Soon after reaching Suffolk, the 7th Massachusetts Battery was posted outside the town near the crossing of the Nansemond River until January 29, 1863. On that day, the battery became part of an expedition to the Blackwater River (which represented the boundary between the Union occupied counties of southeast Virginia and Confederate territory of the interior). Confederates opposed this Union advance on January 30 during the Battle of Deserted House in an isolated location about ten miles west of Suffolk. The 7th Massachusetts Battery was heavily engaged during this battle, suffering 13 casualties including two killed in action and two mortally wounded.

In March 1862, the battery took part in another expedition towards Franklin, Virginia, marching 46 miles in 17 hours and engaging the enemy. When Union forces at Suffolk were besieged by Confederates under the command of Major General James Longstreet, the 7th Massachusetts Battery played an active role in defending the fortifications. After Confederate forces withdrew, the battery participated in a reconnaissance-in-force again towards the Blackwater River led by Maj. Gen. Robert Foster. This movement was opposed by Confederates during the Battle of Carrsville, also known as the Battle of Holland House, on May 14 and 15, 1863 in which the 7th Massachusetts Battery was engaged.

== New York and Washington ==
On June 27, 1863, the battery was transferred back to the Virginia Peninsula where it took part in a demonstration against Richmond commanded by Maj. Gen. John A. Dix. The operation was intended to divert Confederate forces from the Gettysburg Campaign, possibly even resulting in the capture of a lightly defended Richmond but Dix did not press an offensive. On August 18, the battery shipped to New York where it joined other units of the Union army in keeping order in the city in the wake of the New York City draft riots. The battery camped in Madison Square until September 11 when it departed for Washington, D.C. It occupied Camp Barry in the defenses of Washington until January 1864. While at Camp Barry, 24 members of the battery reenlisted for a second three-year term. Together with new recruits and transfers, the unit numbered enough men to continue service as a full field battery. In connection with this reorganization for a second term, the roster of officers was almost completed reorganized and Newman Storer, who had originally joined the unit as a quartermaster sergeant, became captain and commanding officer.

== Louisiana and Arkansas ==
On January 24, 1864, the 7th Massachusetts Battery was assigned to the Department of the Gulf and ordered to ship to New Orleans. The battery reached the city on February 5 and became part of the Second Division of the XIX Corps. For most of the spring the battery was posted in Alexandria, Louisiana, taking part in occasional patrol activities in that vicinity during the Red River Campaign. The battery moved with its division in force on May 11, taking part in the Battle of Mansura and assuming a new post in Morganza, Louisiana. For the most part the battery remained there until July 13.

During the latter part of July 1864, the battery traveled by steamship on an expedition to St. Charles, Arkansas. After returning to Morganza in August, the battery made a second expedition to St. Charles, reaching that point on September 11. On October 23, two of the three sections of the battery were sent to Duvall's Bluff, Arkansas. The battery remained posted in these locations until the end of the year.

== Alabama and Texas ==
On January 10, 1865, the 7th Massachusetts Battery boarded a steamship and began a journey to Alabama to participate in the operations against Mobile. On reaching Dauphin Island, Alabama they were assigned to the First Division of the XIII Corps. From March 27 to April 8, the battery took part in the Battle of Spanish Fort, firing on one of the defenses outside Mobile and taking casualties. When the fort was captured, the battery was immediately sent to participate in the Battle of Fort Blakeley. When the Confederates evacuated Mobile, the battery entered the city with other Union troops and set up camp there, remaining until after the end of the war.

On June 30, the battery was ordered to Texas, reaching Galveston on July 3 and proceeding to Houston. The battery remained there only a short time until they were ordered to return to Massachusetts. The unit stopped at New Orleans and was delayed there for weeks, finally leaving Louisiana in October. They arrived at Gallop's Island in Boston harbor on November 3 and were mustered out on November 10, 1865. The battery lost 3 men killed and mortally wounded and 37 by disease.

== See also ==
- Massachusetts in the Civil War
- List of Massachusetts Civil War units
