= 175th New York Infantry Regiment =

- Active: August 23, 1862 - November 29, 1865
- Country: United States
- Allegiance: Union
- Branch: Infantry
- Engagements: Bayou Teche Campaign; Siege of Port Hudson; Red River Campaign; Battle of Fort Stevens; Third Battle of Winchester; Battle of Fisher's Hill; Battle of Cedar Creek; Carolinas campaign

The 175th New York Infantry Regiment was an infantry regiment in the Union Army during the American Civil War.

== Service ==
The 175th New York Infantry was recruited at large in New York beginning August 23, 1862 and mustered in for three-years service under the command of Colonel Michael K. Bryan.

The regiment was attached to Division at Suffolk, Virginia, VII Corps, Department of Virginia, to December 1862. 1st Brigade, Augur's Division, Department of the Gulf, to March 1863. 3rd Brigade, 3rd Division, XIX Corps, Department of the Gulf, to May 1863. 3rd Brigade, 2nd Division, XIX Corps, to August 1863. 2nd Brigade, 1st Division, XIX Corps, to February 1864. 3rd Brigade, 2nd Division, XIX Corps, Department of the Gulf, to July 1864, and Army of the Shenandoah, Middle Military Division, to January 1865. 3rd Brigade, Grover's Division, District of Savannah, Georgia, Department of the South, to March 1865. 3rd Brigade, 1st Division, X Corps, Army of the Ohio, Department of North Carolina, to May 1865. District of Savannah, Georgia, Department of the South, to July 1865. Department of Georgia to November 1865.

The 175th New York Infantry mustered out of service July 19, 1865, at Raleigh, North Carolina.

== Detailed service ==
Left New York for Suffolk, Va., November 21, 1862. Duty at Suffolk, Va., until December 1862. Moved to New Orleans, La., and duty at Carrollton until March 6, 1863. Moved to Baton Rouge March 6. Operations against Port Hudson March 7–27. Moved to Algiers April 1, then to Berwick April 9. Operations in western Louisiana April 9-May 14. Bayou Teche Campaign April 11–20. Fort Bisland, near Centreville, April 12–13. Vermilion Bayou April 17. Expedition from Opelousas to Alexandria and Simsport May 5–18. Expedition from Berne's Landing to Berwick May 21–26. Franklin May 25. Moved to Port Hudson May 26–30. Siege of Port Hudson May 30-July 9. Assault on Port Hudson June 14. Surrender of Port Hudson July 9. Moved to Baton Rouge July 22, and duty there until March 1864. Operations about St. Martinsville November 12, 1863. Red River Campaign March 23-May 22. At Alexandria March 25-April 12. Cane River April 23–24. At Alexandria April 26-May 13. Retreat to Morganza May 13–20. Mansura May 16. At Morganza until July. Expedition from Morganza to the Atchafalaya May 30-June 5. Atchafalaya River June 1. Moved to Fort Monroe, Va., then to Washington, D.C., July 5–29. Sheridan's Shenandoah Valley Campaign August 7-November 28. Third Battle of Winchester September 19. Fisher's Hill September 22. Battle of Cedar Creek October 19. Duty at Kernstown and Winchester until January 1865. Moved to Savannah, Ga., January 5–22, and duty there until March. Moved to Wilmington, N.C., March 5, then to Morehead City March 10, and duty there until April 8. Moved to Goldsboro April 8, then to Savannah, Ga., May 2. Duty at Savannah and at other points in the Department of Georgia until November 1865.

== Casualties ==
The regiment lost a total of 134 men during service; 2 officers and 12 enlisted men killed or mortally wounded, 3 officers and 117 enlisted men died of disease.

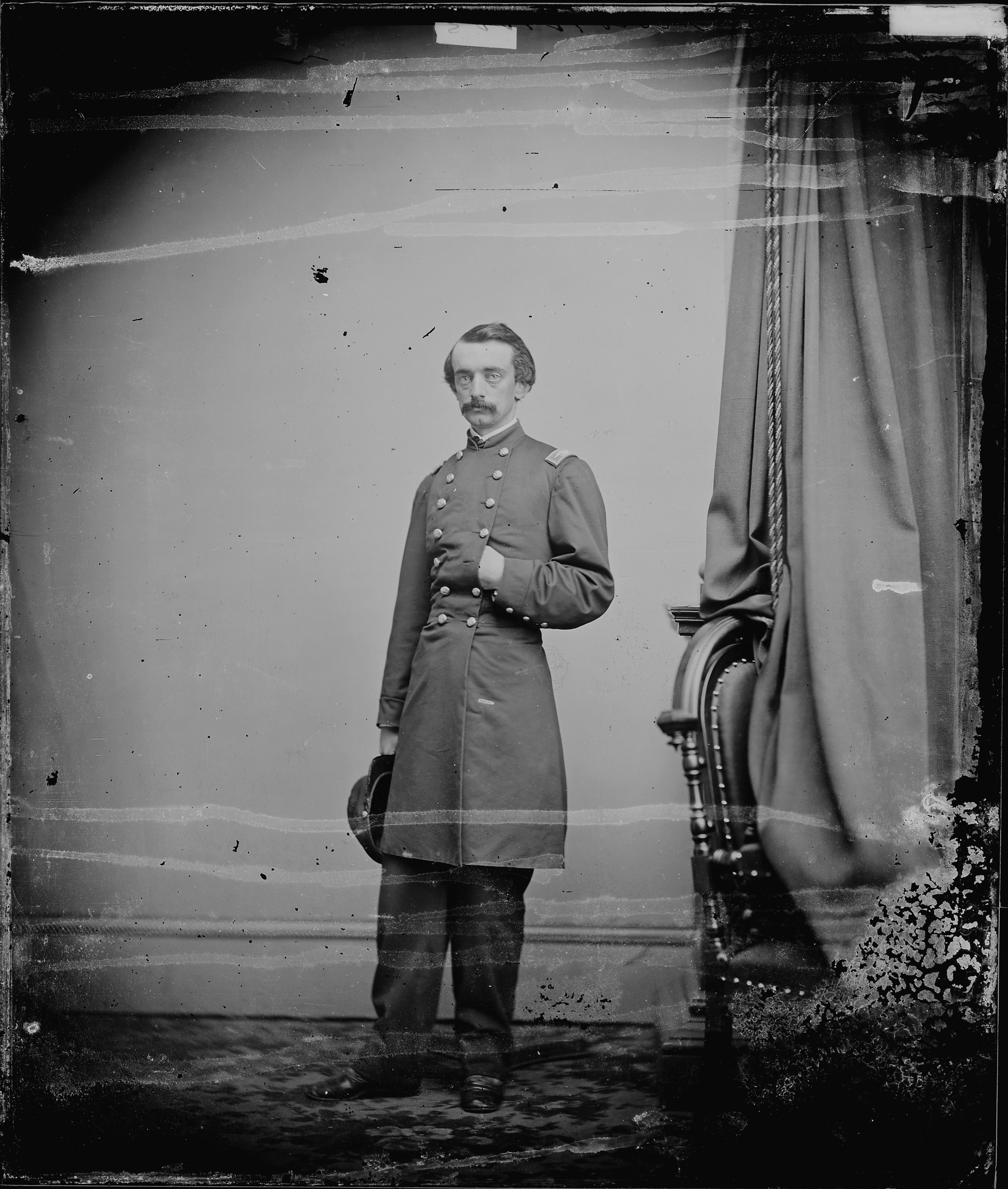
Col. John A. Foster

== Commanders ==
- Colonel Michael K. Bryan - killed in action during the assault on Port Hudson, June 14, 1863
- Colonel John A. Foster

== See also ==
- List of New York Civil War regiments
- New York in the Civil War
