= 156th New York Infantry Regiment =

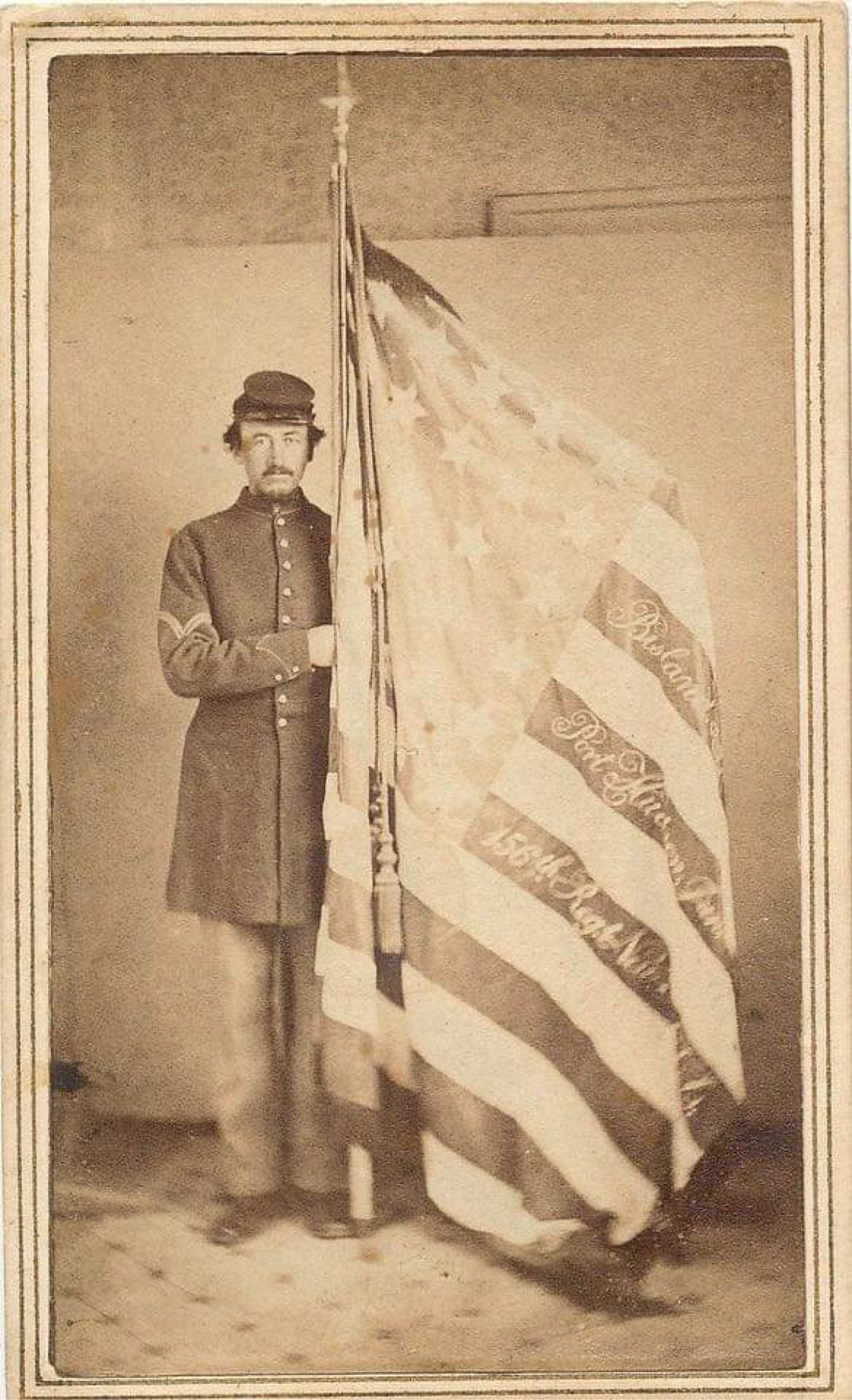
- Active: August 23, 1862 - October 23, 1865
- Country: United States
- Allegiance: Union
- Branch: Infantry
- Engagements: Bayou Teche Campaign; Siege of Port Hudson; Red River Campaign; Battle of Fort Stevens; Third Battle of Winchester; Battle of Fisher's Hill; Battle of Cedar Creek; Carolinas campaign

The 156th New York Infantry Regiment (aka, "Mountain Legion") was an infantry regiment in the Union Army during the American Civil War.

== Service ==
The 156th New York Infantry was organized at Kingston, New York beginning August 23, 1862 and mustered in for three-years service on November 17, 1862 under the command of Colonel Erastus Cooke.

The regiment was attached to Sherman's Division, Department of the Gulf, to January 1863. 1st Brigade, 3rd Division, XIX Corps, Department of the Gulf, January 1863. 3rd Brigade, 3rd Division, XIX Corps, to July 1863. 2nd Brigade, 1st Division, XIX Corps, to February 1864. 3rd Brigade, 2nd Division, XIX Corps, Department of the Gulf, to July 1864, and Army of the Shenandoah, Middle Military Division, to January 1865. 3rd Brigade, Grover's Division, District of Savannah, Georgia, Department of the South, to March 1865. 3rd Brigade, 1st Division, X Corps, Army of the Ohio, to May 1865. District of Savannah, Georgia, Department of Georgia, to July, 1865.

The 156th New York Infantry mustered out of service October 23, 1865 at Augusta, Georgia.

== Detailed service ==
Left New York for New Orleans, La., December 4, 1862. Camp at Carrollton, La., until February 11, 1863. Expedition to Plaquemine February 11–19. At Carrollton until March 6. Moved to Baton Rouge, La., March 6. Operations against Port Hudson March 7–27. Moved to Algiers April 1, then to Berwick City April 9. Operations in western Louisiana April 9-May 14. Bayou Teche Campaign April 11–20. Fort Bisland near Centreville, April 12–13. Vermilion Bayou April 17. Opelousas April 20. Expedition from Opelousas to Alexandria and Simsport May 5–18. Moved to Port Hudson May 22–25. Siege of Port Hudson May 25-July 9. Assaults on Port Hudson May 27 and June 14. Expedition to Clinton June 3–8. Surrender of Port Hudson July 9. Moved to Baton Rouge, then to Donaldsonville, July 11–15, and duty there until August 15. At Baton Rouge until March 1864. Red River Campaign March 23-May 22. At Alexandria March 25-April 12. Cane River April 23–24. Construction of dam at Alexandria April 30-May 10. Actions at Alexandria May 2 and 9. Retreat to Morganza May 13–20. Mansura May 16. At Morganza until July. Expedition from Morganza to the Atchafalaya May 30-June 5. Atchafalaya River June 1. Moved to Fort Monroe, Va., then to Washington, D.C., July 5–29. Sheridan's Shenandoah Valley Campaign August 5-November 28. Third Battle of Winchester September 19. Fisher's Hill September 22. Battle of Cedar Creek October 19. Duty at Kernstown and Winchester until January 1865. Moved to Savannah, Ga., January 5–22, and duty there until March 5. Moved to Wilmington, N.C., March 5, then to Morehead City March 10, and duty there until April 8. Moved to Goldsboro April 8, then to Savannah May 2. Duty at Savannah, Ga., and in the Department of Georgia until October.

== Casualties ==
The regiment lost a total of 227 men during service; 4 officers and 56 enlisted men killed or mortally wounded, 3 officers and 164 enlisted men died of disease.

== Commanders ==
- Colonel Erastus Cooke
- Colonel Jacob Sharpe
- Lieutenant Colonel Alfred Neafie

== See also ==
- List of New York Civil War regiments
- New York in the Civil War
