= 81st Illinois Infantry Regiment =

81st Regiment Illinois Volunteer Infantry
- Illinois flag
- Active: August 21, 1862, to August 5, 1865
- Country: United States
- Allegiance: Union
- Branch: Infantry
- Equipment: Battle of Port Gibson; Battle of Raymond; Battle of Jackson; Battle of Champion's Hill; Siege of Vicksburg; Battle of Lovejoy's Station

The 81st Regiment Illinois Volunteer Infantry was an infantry regiment that served in the Union Army during the American Civil War.

== Service ==
The 81st Illinois Infantry was organized at Anna, Illinois and mustered into Federal service on August 21, 1862.

The regiment was mustered out on August 5, 1865.

== Total strength and casualties ==
The regiment suffered 8 officers and 66 enlisted men who were killed in action or who died of their wounds and 3 officers and 292 enlisted men who died of disease, for a total of 369 fatalities.

== Commanders ==
- Colonel James J. Dollins - Killed in action at the Siege of Vicksburg, May 22, 1863.
- Colonel Franklin Campbell - Resigned August 20, 1864.
- Lieutenant Colonel Andrew W. Rogers - Mustered out with the regiment.

== See also ==
- List of Illinois Civil War Units
- Illinois in the American Civil War
