= 24th Iowa Infantry Regiment =

- Iowa state flag
- Active: September 18, 1862, to July 17, 1865
- Country: United States
- Allegiance: Union
- Branch: Infantry
- Engagements: Battle of Port Gibson; Battle of Champion Hill; Battle of Big Black River; Siege of Vicksburg; Red River Campaign; Battle of Cedar Creek

The 24th Iowa Infantry Regiment was an infantry regiment that served in the Union Army during the American Civil War.

== Service ==
The 24th Iowa Infantry was organized at Muscatine, Iowa and mustered in for three years of Federal service on September 18, 1862.

The regiment was mustered out on July 17, 1865.

== Total strength and casualties ==
A total of 1204 men served in the 24th Iowa at one time or another during its existence. It suffered 6 officers and 69 enlisted men who were killed in action or who died of their wounds and 1 officer and 208 enlisted men who died of disease, for a total of 284 fatalities.

== Commanders ==
- Colonel Eber C. Byam
- Colonel John Q. Wilds
- Lieutenant Colonel Edward Wright

== See also ==
- List of Iowa Civil War Units
- Iowa in the American Civil War
- Samuel J. Kirkwood
- Siege of Vicksburg
- Battle of Big Black River Bridge

== Notes ==
This article incorporates text from Iowa and the rebellion: A history of the troops furnished by the state of Iowa to the volunteer armies of the Union, which conquered the great Southern Rebellion of 1861-5, by Lurton Dunham Ingersoll, a publication from 1866, now in the public domain in the United States.
