= 56th Ohio Infantry Regiment =

- Active: December 12, 1861, to April 25, 1866
- Country: United States
- Allegiance: Union
- Branch: Union Army
- Type: Infantry
- Engagements: Battle of Shiloh; Siege of Corinth; Battle of Port Gibson; Battle of Champion Hill; Siege of Vicksburg; Siege of Jackson; Red River Campaign; Battle of Sabine Cross Roads

The 56th Ohio Infantry Regiment was an infantry regiment in the Union Army during the American Civil War.

== Service ==
The 56th Ohio Infantry Regiment was organized at Camp Morrow in Portsmouth, Ohio and mustered in for three years service On December 12, 1861, under the command of Colonel Peter Kinney.

The regiment was attached to 3rd Brigade, 3rd Division, Army of the Tennessee, to July 1862. Helena, Arkansas, District of Eastern Arkansas, to November 1862. 2nd Brigade, 12th Division, District of Eastern Arkansas, Department of the Tennessee, to January 1863. 2nd Brigade, 12th Division, XIII Corps, Army of the Tennessee, to July 1863. 2nd Brigade, 3rd Division, XIII Corps, Department of the Tennessee, to August 1863, and Department of the Gulf, to June 1864. Defenses of New Orleans, Louisiana, Department of the Gulf, to April 1866.

The 56th Ohio Infantry mustered out of service on December 25, 1866, at New Orleans, Louisiana.

== Detailed service ==
Moved to Paducah, Ky., then to Fort Donelson, Tenn., February 12–15, 1862. Fort Donelson February 15–16. Expedition toward Purdy and operations about Crump's Landing March 9–14, 1862. Battle of Shiloh, Tenn., April 6–7. Advance on and siege of Corinth, Miss., April 29-May 30. March to Memphis, Tenn., June 1–13, and duty there until July 24. Germantown and Lafayette Station June 25. Ordered to Helena, Ark., June 24, and duty there until April 1863. Gorman's Expedition from Helena to Eunice August 28-September 5, 1862. Expedition against Arkansas Post November 16–21. Ordered to Milliken's Bend, La., April 11, 1863. Movement on Bruinsburg, Mississippi and turning Grand Gulf April 25–30. Battle of Port Gibson May 1. Fourteen-Mile Creek May 12. Battle of Champion Hill May 16. Siege of Vicksburg, Miss., May 18-July 4. Assaults on Vicksburg May 19 and 22. Advance on Jackson, Miss., July 4–10. Siege of Jackson July 10–17. Ordered to New Orleans, La., August 13. Duty there until September 13, and at Berwick Bay until October. Western Louisiana Campaign October 3-November 30. Grand Coteau November 3. At New Iberia until December 17. Moved to New Orleans December 17, then to Madisonville January 22, 1864, and duty there until March 1. Moved to New Orleans March 1. Red River Campaign March 10-May 5. Advance from Franklin to Alexandria March 14–26. Battle of Sabine Cross Roads April 8. Pleasant Hill April 9. Monett's Ferry, Cane River, April 23. At Alexandria April 26-May 4. Davidson's Ferry, Red River, May 4–5. Natchitoches May 5. Dunn's Bayou, destruction of transport Warner, May 5. Veterans absent on furlough May to July. Return to New Orleans, La., and duty in the defenses of that city until April 1866. Expedition from New Orleans to Mandeville January 15–17, 1865 (detachment).

== Casualties ==
The regiment lost a total of 216 men during service; 3 officers and 55 enlisted men killed or mortally wounded, 2 officers and 156 enlisted men died of disease.

== Commanders ==
- Colonel Peter Kinney - resigned in April 1863
- Colonel William Henry Raynor

== Notable members ==
- Captain George Wilhelm, Company F - Medal of Honor recipient for action at the battle of Champion Hill; later promoted to lieutenant colonel of the regiment

== See also ==
- List of Ohio Civil War units
- Ohio in the Civil War
- Battle of Shiloh
- Siege of Corinth
- Siege of Vicksburg
- Red River Campaign
