= 1st Independent Battery Indiana Light Artillery =

1st Indiana Light Artillery Battery
- Active: August 5, 1861–August 22, 1865
- Disbanded: August 22, 1865
- Allegiance: Union
- Branch: Artillery
- Size: Battery
- Engagements: Battle of Pea Ridge; Battle of Port Gibson; Battle of Champion Hill; Battle of Big Black River Bridge; Siege of Vicksburg, May 19 & May 22 assaults Bayou Teche Campaign; Red River Campaign; Battle of Sabine Crossroads; Battle of Spanish Fort; Battle of Fort Blakeley

Commanders
- Captain: Martin Klauss

The 1st Indiana Light Artillery Battery was an artillery battery from Indiana that served in the Union Army between August 5, 1861, and August 22, 1865, during the American Civil War.

== Service ==
The battery was organized at Evansville, Indiana August 5, 1861, and mustered in at Indianapolis, Indiana for a three-year enlistment on August 16, 1861, under the command of Captain Martin Klauss.

The battery was attached to Fremont's Army of the West and Department of the Missouri to January 1862. Artillery, 1st Brigade, 3rd Division, Army of Southwest Missouri, Department of the Missouri, to May 1862. Artillery, 1st Division, Army of Southwest Missouri, to July 1862. District of Eastern Arkansas, Department of the Missouri, to October 1862. Artillery, 1st Division, District of Southeast Missouri, Department of the Missouri, to March 1863. Artillery, 14th Division, XIII Corps, Army of the Tennessee, to July 1863. Artillery, 1st Division, XIII Corps, Department of the Tennessee, to August 1863, and Department of the Gulf to September 1863. District of LaFourche, Department of the Gulf, to February 1864. Artillery, 1st Division, XIII Corps, Department of the Gulf, to March 1864. Artillery, 4th Division, XIII Corps, to July 1864. Artillery Reserve, Department of the Gulf, to February 1865. Artillery Brigade, XVI Corps, Military Division West Mississippi, to August 1865.

The 1st Indiana Battery Light Artillery mustered out of service on August 22, 1865.

== Detailed service ==
Moved to St. Louis, Missouri. Fremont's Advance on Springfield, Missouri, September 27-October 3, 1861. Camp at LaMine until January 1862. Advance on Springfield, Missouri, in pursuit of Price January 25-February 14. Pursuit of Price into Arkansas February 15–29. Battles of Pea Ridge, March 6–8. March to Sugar Creek March 10, then to Cross Timbers March 15. March to Batesville April 5-May 3. March to Helena, Arkansas, May 25-July 14, and duty there until October. Moved to Ironton, Pilot Knob, Missouri, and operations in southeast Missouri until March 1863. Ordered to St. Genevieve, Missouri, March 5; then to Milliken's Bend, Louisiana, March 14–25, and duty there until April 25. Movement on Bruinsburg and turning Grand Gulf April 25–30. Battle of Port Gibson, May 1. Battle of Champion Hill May 16. Big Black River May 17. Siege of Vicksburg, Mississippi, May 18-July 4. Assaults on Vicksburg May 19 and 22. Advance on Jackson, Mississippi, May 4–10. Siege of Jackson July 10–17. Duty at Vicksburg until August 20. Ordered to New Orleans, Louisiana. Duty there and at Brashear City until October. Western Louisiana Campaign October 3-November 30. Duty in the District of LaFourche, Louisiana, until March 1864. Red River Campaign March 10-May 22. Battle of Sabine Crossroads April 8. Cane River Crossing April 23. At Alexandria April 27-May 13. Retreat to Morganza May 13–20. Moved to New Orleans and duty there until March 1865. Campaign against Mobile, Alabama, and its defenses March 17-April 12. Siege of Spanish Fort and Fort Blakely March 26-April 8. Fort Blakely April 9. Capture of Mobile April 12. March to Montgomery April 13–25, and duty there until August.

== Casualties ==
The battery lost a total of 35 men during service; 3 enlisted men killed or mortally wounded, 1 officer and 31 enlisted men died of disease.

== Commanders ==
- Captain Martin Klauss

== See also ==
- List of Indiana Civil War regiments
- Indiana in the Civil War
