= 16th Ohio Independent Light Artillery Battery =

16th Ohio Battery
- Active: August 20, 1861, to August 2, 1865
- Country: United States
- Allegiance: Union
- Branch: Artillery
- Engagements: Battle of Port Gibson; Battle of Champion Hill; Siege of Vicksburg, May 19 & May 22 assaults Siege of Jackson

16th Ohio Battery was an artillery battery that served in the Union Army during the American Civil War.

== Service ==
The 16th Ohio Battery was organized in Springfield, Ohio August 20, 1861, and mustered in September 5, 1861, for a three-year enlistment under Captain James A. Mitchell. Despite its designation, it was actually the third battery raised in Ohio.

The battery was attached to 1st Division, District of Southeast Missouri, Department of the Missouri, to May 1862. Artillery, 1st Division, Army of Southwest Missouri, to July 1862. District of Eastern Arkansas, Department of the Missouri, to January 1863. Artillery, 12th Division, XIII Corps, Army of the Tennessee, to July 1863. Artillery, 3rd Division, XIII Corps, Department of the Tennessee, to August 1863, and Department of the Gulf to January 1864. Artillery, 1st Division, XIII Corps, Department of the Gulf, to June 1864. Defenses of New Orleans, Louisiana, Department of the Gulf, to August 1864. Artillery Reserve, Department of the Gulf, to August 1865.

The 16th Ohio Battery mustered out of service at Camp Chase in Columbus, Ohio, on August 2, 1865.

== Detailed service ==
Ordered to St. Louis, Mo., September 5. Moved from St. Louis to Jefferson City, Mo., October 13, and duty there until February 14, 1862. Moved to St. Louis, Mo., then to Pilot Knob, Mo., March 6. March to Doniphan March 21–31, 1862. Action at Pitman's Ferry April 1. Moved to Pocahontas, Ark., April 5–11; then to Jacksonport May 3. To Batesville May 14, then marched to Augusta, Ark., June 20-July 4. Marched to Clarendon, then to Helena, Ark., July 5–14. Duty at Helena and at Old Town Landing until April 1863. Ordered to Milliken's Bend, La., April 8. Movement on Bruinsburg and turning Grand Gulf April 25–30. Battle of Port Gibson May 1. Fourteen-Mile Creek May 12–13. Battle of Champion Hill May 16. Siege of Vicksburg, Miss., May 18-July 4. Assaults on Vicksburg May 19 and 22. Advance on Jackson, Miss., July 5–10. Siege of Jackson July 10–17. Ordered to New Orleans, La., August 21, and duty there until September 20. Moved to Berwick Bay and duty there until December 27. Ordered to New Orleans, then to Texas January 1, 1864. Duty at Matagardo Peninsula, Indianola, Powder Horn, and Matagorda Island until June 1864. Ordered to New Orleans, La., and garrison duty there until July 13, 1865. Ordered home July 13, 1865.

== Casualties ==
The battery lost a total of 47 men during service; 1 officer and 1 enlisted man killed or mortally wounded, 45 enlisted men died due to disease.

== Commanders ==
- Captain James A. Mitchell

== See also ==
- List of Ohio Civil War units
- Ohio in the Civil War
