= 2nd Illinois Cavalry Regiment =

- Illinois flag
- Active: August 12, 1861, to December 30, 1865
- Country: United States
- Allegiance: Union
- Branch: Cavalry
- Engagements: Battle of Champion Hill (7 companies)

The 2nd Illinois Cavalry Regiment was a cavalry regiment that served in the Union Army during the American Civil War.

== Service ==
Companies "A" to "L of the 2nd Illinois Cavalry was mustered into service at Camp Butler, Illinois, on August 12, 1861. Company "M"" was mustered in on December 30, 1861.

The regiment was mustered out on December 30, 1865.

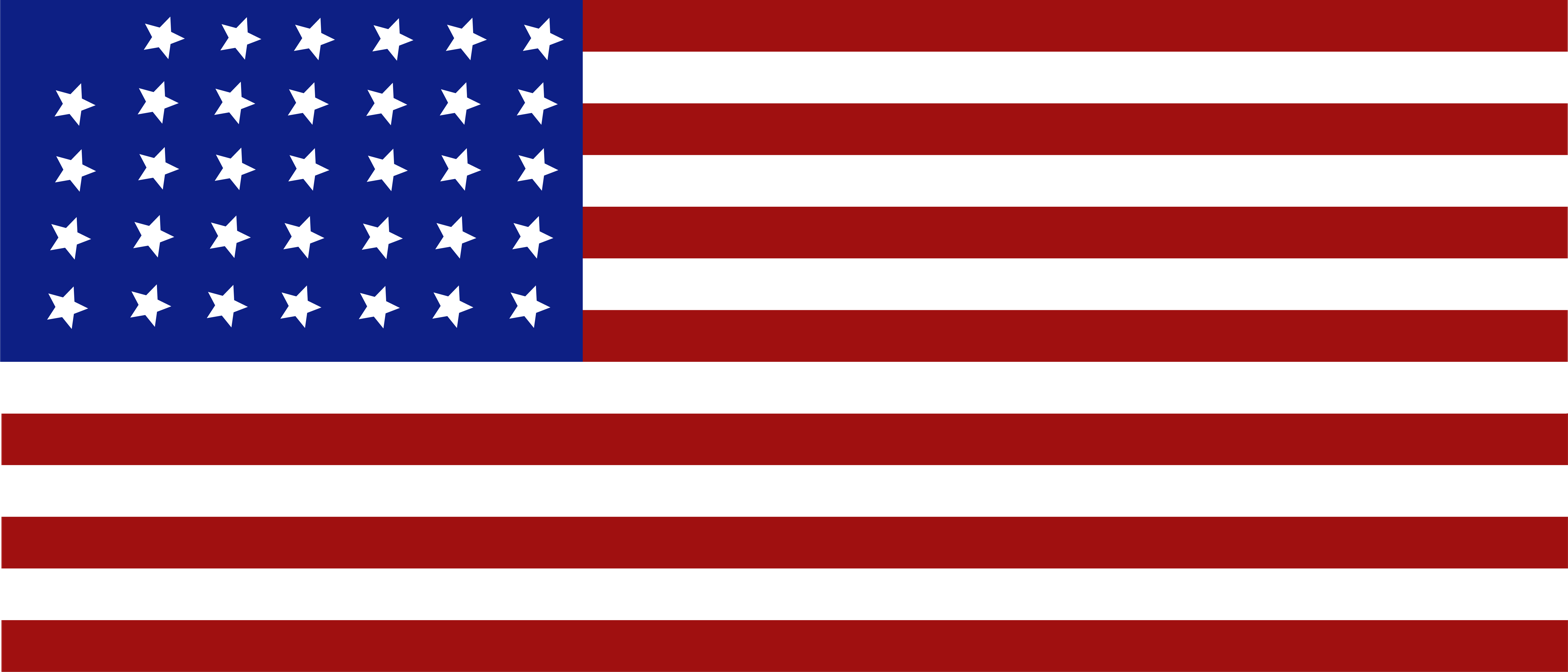
Digital remake of the flag used by Company I

== Total strength and casualties ==
The regiment suffered 8 officers and 50 enlisted men who were killed in action or who died of their wounds and 3 officers and 173 enlisted men who died of disease, for a total of 234 fatalities.

== Commanders ==
- Colonel Silas Noble - mustered out February 16, 1863
- Colonel John J. Mudd - killed in action May 3, 1864
- Colonel Daniel B. Bush, Jr. - discharged July 24, 1865
- Colonel Benjamin F. Marsh

== See also ==
- List of Illinois Civil War Units
- Illinois in the American Civil War
