= 2nd New York Veteran Cavalry Regiment =

Former unit of the Union Army

The 2nd New York Veteran Cavalry Regiment, officially known as the 2nd Regiment, New York Veteran Volunteer Cavalry, was a unit of the Union Army during the American Civil War. The three-year volunteer cavalry regiment was raised in 1863 from veterans of the 30th New York Volunteer Infantry Regiment, briefly reorganized as the Empire Light Cavalry. It was mustered into federal service by companies 15 August through 30 December 1863. Due to the end of the war before its three-year enlistment, it mustered out of service on 8 November 1865.

== Service ==
It served primarily in the Department of the Gulf's Cavalry Division.

== See also ==
- List of New York Civil War units
