= 2nd Ohio Independent Light Artillery Battery =

2nd Ohio Independent Battery
- Active: August 7, 1861, to July 21, 1865
- Country: United States
- Allegiance: Union
- Branch: Artillery
- Engagements: Battle of Pea Ridge; Battle of Port Gibson; Battle of Champion Hill; Siege of Vicksburg, May 19 & May 22 assaults Siege of Jackson; Red River Campaign

2nd Ohio Independent Battery was an artillery battery that served in the Union Army during the American Civil War.

== Service ==
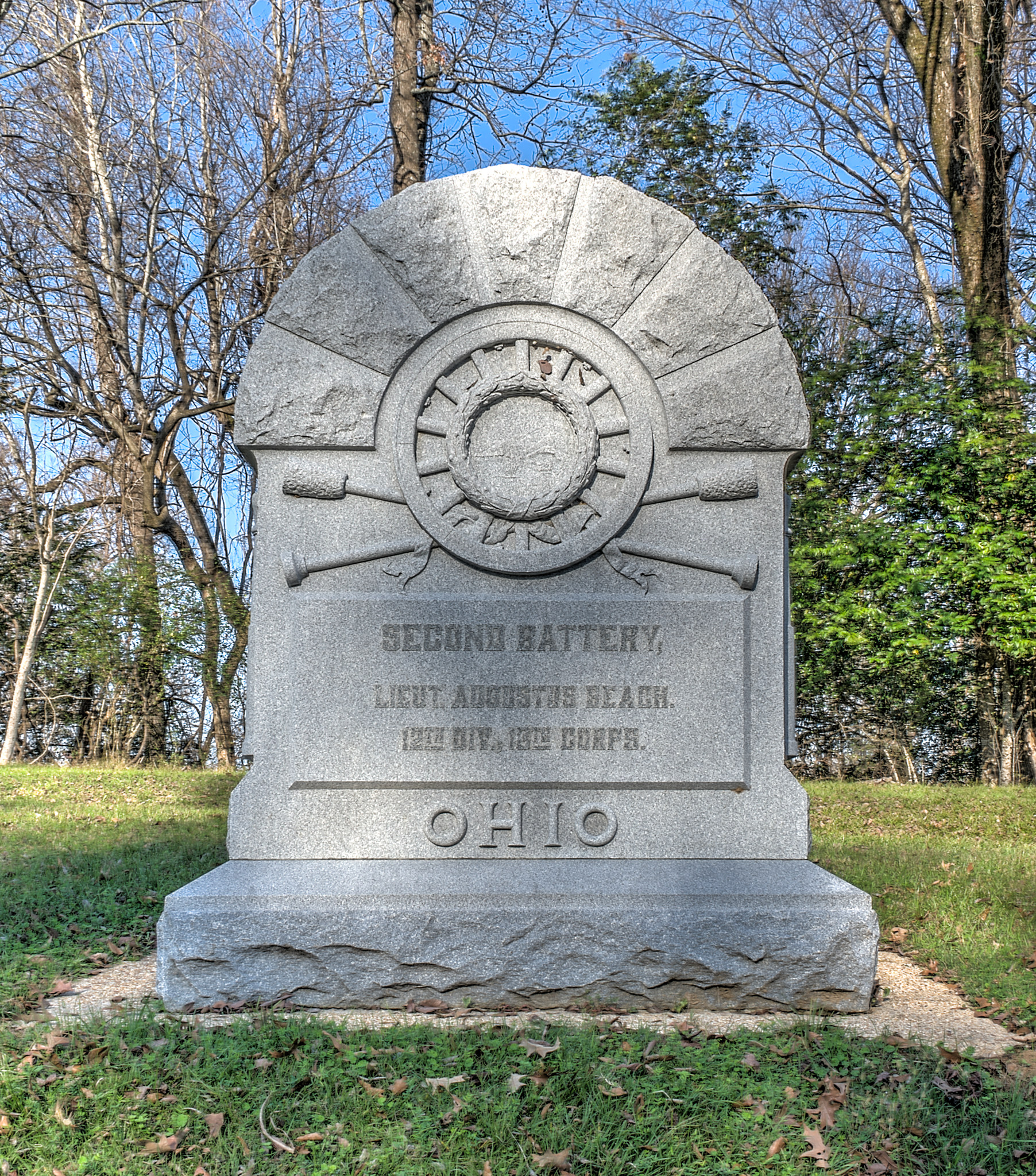
Memorial at Vicksburg National Military Park

The 2nd Ohio Battery was organized at Camp Chase in Columbus, Ohio and mustered in for three years service on August 7, 1861, under Captain Thomas J. Carlin.

The battery was attached to Army of the West and Department of the Missouri to January 1862. 5th Brigade, Army of Southwest Missouri, to March 1862. Artillery, 2nd Division, Army of Southwest Missouri, to May 1862. Artillery, 3rd Division, Army of Southwest Missouri, to July 1862. District of Eastern Arkansas, Department of Missouri, to January 1863. Artillery, 12th Division, XIII Corps, Department of the Tennessee, to July 1863. Artillery, 3rd Division, XIII Corps, Department of the Tennessee, to August 1863, and Department of the Gulf to November 1863. Plaquemine, Louisiana, District of Baton Rouge, Louisiana, Department of the Gulf, to March 1864. Artillery, 3rd Division, XIII Corps, to June 1864. Defenses of New Orleans, Louisiana, Department of the Gulf, to August 1864. Reserve Artillery, Department of the Gulf, to February 1865. Post of Ship Island, Department of the Gulf, to August 1865.

The 2nd Ohio Battery mustered out of service July 21, 1865.

== Detailed service ==
Ordered to St. Louis, Mo., August 15; thence to Jefferson City, Mo., and duty there until October 4. Fremont's advance on Springfield, Mo., October 4–27, 1861. Duty at Springfield until November 8. Moved to Rolla, Mo., and duty there until February 24, 1862. Curtis' Campaign against Price in Missouri and Arkansas February–March. Battles of Pea Ridge, Ark., March 6–8. March to Batesville over Ozark Mountains April 5-May 8, thence to Helena, Ark., May 25-July 13. Duty at Helena, Ark., until March 1863. Expedition from Helena to St. Francis and Little Rivers March 5–12. Madison March 9. Ordered to Milliken's Bend, La., March 20, and duty there until April. Movements on Bruinsburg, Mississippi and turning Grand Gulf April 25–30. Battle of Port Gibson May 1. Fourteen-Mile Creek May 12–13. Battle of Champion Hill May 16. Siege of Vicksburg, Miss., May 18-July 4. Assaults on Vicksburg May 19 and 22. Advance on Jackson, Miss., July 5–10. Siege of Jackson July 10–17. At Big Black until August. Ordered to New Orleans, La., August 13; duty there and at Plaquemine, La., until March 1864. Western Louisiana Campaign October 3-November 30, 1863. Red River Campaign March 10-May 22, 1864. Advance from Franklin to Alexandria, La., March 14–26. Middle Bayou May 8. Retreat to Morganza May 13–20. Duty at Plaquemine until February 1865, and at Ship Island, Miss., until July.

== Casualties ==
The battery lost a total of 47 men during service; 2 enlisted men killed or mortally wounded, 45 enlisted men died of disease or accident.

== Commanders ==
- Captain Thomas J. Carlin, August 1861-June 1862, resigned due to failing health
- Lieutenant / Captain William B. Chapman, June-October 1862, wounded at the Battle of Pea Ridge in March 1862, resigned due to health
- Captain Newton J. Smith, October 1862-March 1863, returned to Ohio on medical leave April 1863, Special Order discharge August 1863
- Lieutenant / Captain Augustus Beach, April 1863-August 1865

== See also ==
- List of Ohio Civil War units
- Ohio in the Civil War
