= Bayou Teche campaign =

1863 campaign of the American Civil War in Louisiana

The Bayou Teche campaign, or First Bayou Teche campaign, was a brief military campaign in April and May 1863 during the American Civil War by forces from the Confederate States Army seeking to prevent the Union Army from gaining control of northern Louisiana. Union forces were seeking to gain a foothold on the Red River as a prelude to besieging Port Hudson, a Confederate strong point on the Mississippi River.

A second campaign, featuring a series of maneuvers in the same region from October until November 1863 is often referred to as the Second Bayou Teche campaign.

== First Bayou Teche campaign ==
In March 1863, Union commander Nathaniel P. Banks, headquartered near New Orleans, wanted to drive back the Confederate forces in western Louisiana and secure a route to connect with the Mississippi River north of Confederate-held Port Hudson. Using a combined force of infantry and Union Navy vessels, Banks advanced up the Teche against Confederate units under the overall command of Richard Taylor, son of former U.S. President Zachary Taylor. Banks was successful in the Battle of Fort Bisland and Battle of Irish Bend. Taylor retreated from the Teche region, and Banks was able to capture the Confederate fort at Butte a la Rose and Alexandria.

== Second Bayou Teche campaign ==
In the second half of 1863, Banks was under orders to gain a foothold in Texas. His first attempt had been repulsed at the Second Battle of Sabine Pass. In October, he ordered troops under Maj. Gen. William B. Franklin to move north-west from New Iberia and the Berwick Bay area to probe the land route toward Texas. The difficulty of the route, the resistance from Confederates, and the success of a coastal operation in Texas led to the termination of Franklin's advance.
