= Indiana Volunteer Infantry =

The Indiana Volunteer Infantry is a military organization organized from citizens or residents of the U.S. state of Indiana.

Individual organizations that have been part of the Indiana Volunteer Infantry include:

- 1st Indiana Volunteers
- 5th Indiana Volunteers
- 6th Indiana Infantry Regiment
- 7th Indiana Infantry Regiment
- 8th Indiana Infantry Regiment
- 9th Indiana Infantry Regiment
- 11th Indiana Infantry Regiment
- 13th Indiana Infantry Regiment
- 18th Indiana Infantry Regiment
- 19th Indiana Infantry Regiment, the "Iron Brigade"
- 20th Indiana Infantry Regiment
- 22nd Indiana Infantry Regiment
- 23rd Indiana Infantry Regiment
- 24th Indiana Infantry Regiment
- 25th Indiana Infantry Regiment
- 26th Indiana Infantry Regiment
- 27th Indiana Infantry Regiment
- 29th Indiana Infantry Regiment
- 30th Indiana Infantry Regiment
- 32nd Indiana Infantry Regiment, the "1st German"
- 33rd Indiana Infantry Regiment
- 35th Indiana Infantry Regiment
- 2nd Regiment Indiana Cavalry, the "41st Indiana Infantry"
- 42nd Indiana Infantry Regiment
- 43rd Indiana Infantry Regiment
- 44th Indiana Infantry Regiment
- 47th Indiana Infantry Regiment
- 48th Indiana Infantry Regiment
- 97th Indiana Infantry Regiment
- 99th Indiana Infantry Regiment
- 101st Indiana Infantry Regiment
