= 75th Indiana Infantry Regiment =

75th Regiment Indiana Infantry
- Active: August 19, 1862 – June 8, 1865
- Country: United States
- Allegiance: Union
- Branch: Infantry
- Engagements: Tullahoma Campaign; Battle of Chickamauga; Siege of Chattanooga; Battle of Missionary Ridge; Atlanta campaign Battle of Resaca; Battle of Kennesaw Mountain; Battle of Peachtree Creek; Siege of Atlanta; Battle of Jonesboro; Sherman's March to the Sea; Carolinas campaign Battle of Bentonville

The 75th Regiment Indiana Infantry was an infantry regiment that served in the Union Army during the American Civil War.

== Service ==
The 75th Indiana Infantry was organized at Wabash, Indiana and mustered in for a three-year enlistment on August 19, 1862, under the command of Colonel Milton Stapp Robinson.

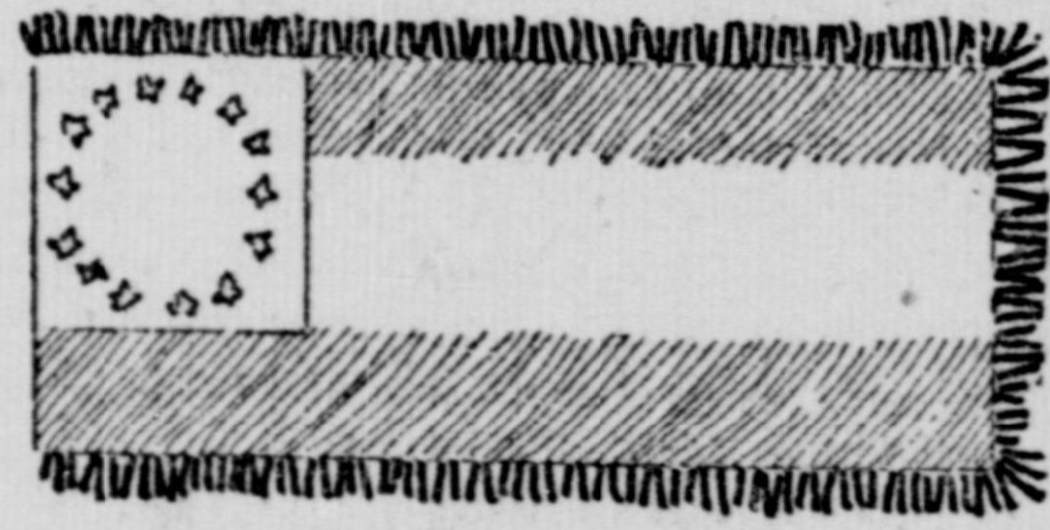
Flag of the 3rd Regiment Georgia Cavalry captured by the regiment on September 29, 1862

The regiment was attached to 40th Brigade, 12th Division, Army of the Ohio, to November 1862. 2nd Brigade, 5th Division, Center, XIV Corps, Army of the Cumberland, to January 1863. 2nd Brigade, 5th Division, XIV Corps, to June 1863. 2nd Brigade, 4th Division, XIV Corps, to October 1863. 2nd Brigade, 3rd Division, XIV Corps, to June 1865.

The 75th Indiana Infantry mustered out of service at Washington, D.C., on June 8, 1865.

== Detailed service ==
This regiment was organized at Wabash and was mustered in on August 19, 1862. It left the state on August 21 for Lebanon, Kentucky, but retired to Louisville upon Bragg's advance. It then moved to Frankfort, Scottsville, Gallatin and Cave City in pursuit of Morgan's forces. It was in camp near Gallatin during December and moved in January 1863 to Murfreesboro, being engaged in scouting and brief expeditions, with the 2nd Brigade, 3rd Division, 14th Army Corps. On June 24 it started for Tullahoma, participated in the Battle at Hoover's Gap and was the first regiment to enter the enemy's works at Tullahoma. Moving then towards Chattanooga, it was engaged at Chickamauga, losing 17 killed and 107 wounded. It remained near Chattanooga during the fall and winter and was engaged in the battle of Missionary Ridge. It moved to Ringgold, Georgia, in Spring 1864, joined the campaign to Atlanta, and was engaged at Dalton, Resaca, Dallas, Kennesaw Mountain, Peachtree Creek, in front of Atlanta, and at Jonesboro. On October 4, the regiment moved with its corps to Pine Mountain, and arrived in time to threaten the rear of French's division of Hood's army, which was investing the garrison at Allatoona. The regiment pursued the enemy to Gaylesville, and returned in time to join the march upon Savannah, which city was reached in December. In January 1865, the regiment made the march through the Carolinas to Goldsboro, participating en route in the battles of Fayetteville and Bentonville. It then moved with the advance of the army to Raleigh, skirmishing at Smithfield, then to Richmond and Washington, and was mustered out at Washington, June 8, 1865. Recruits were transferred to the 42nd Indiana Infantry. and served with that regiment until its muster out. The original strength of the 75th was 1,031; gain by recruits, 96; total, 1,127. Loss by death, 227; desertion, 30; unaccounted for, 31.

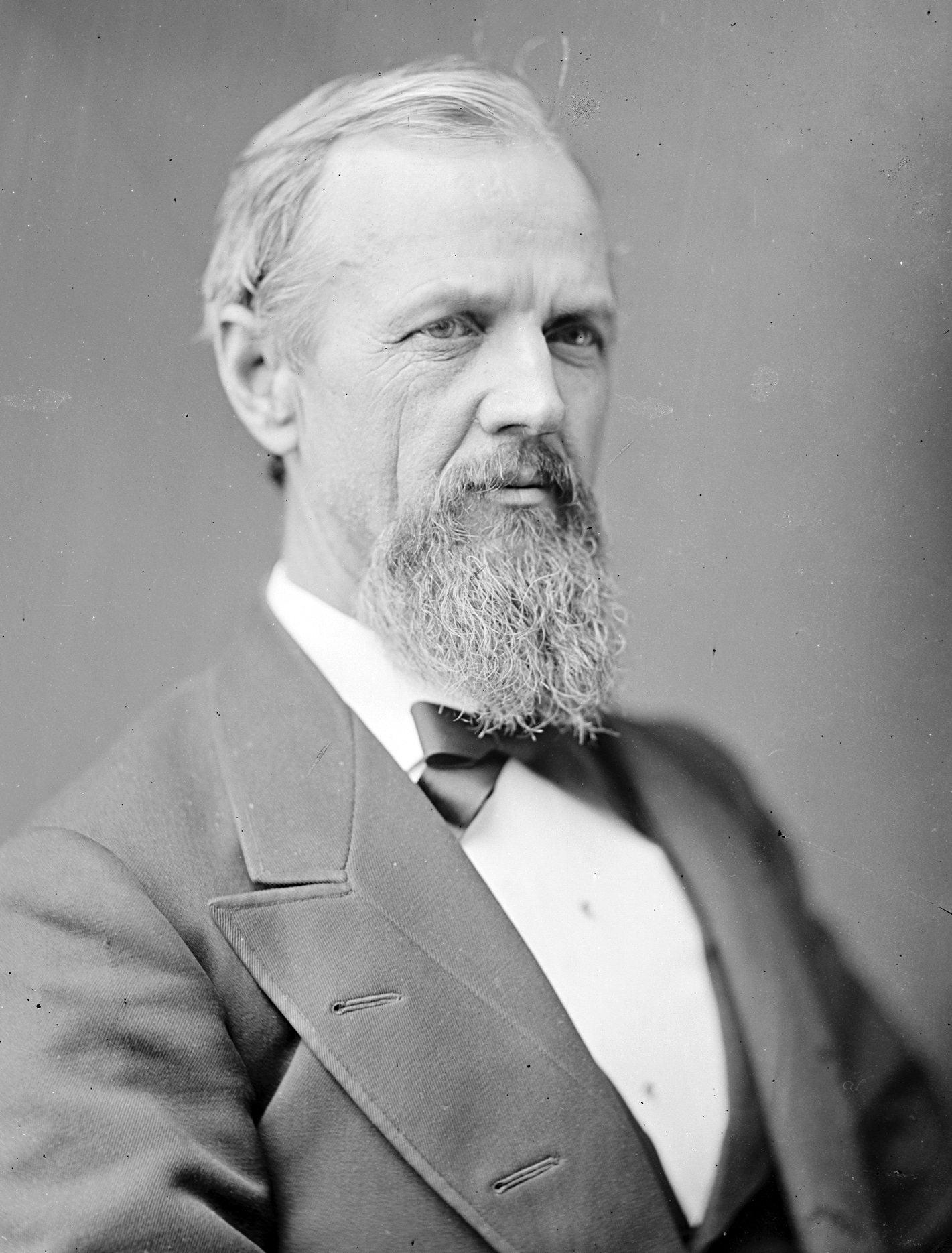
Milton S. Robinson one of the commanders of the 75th Indiana.

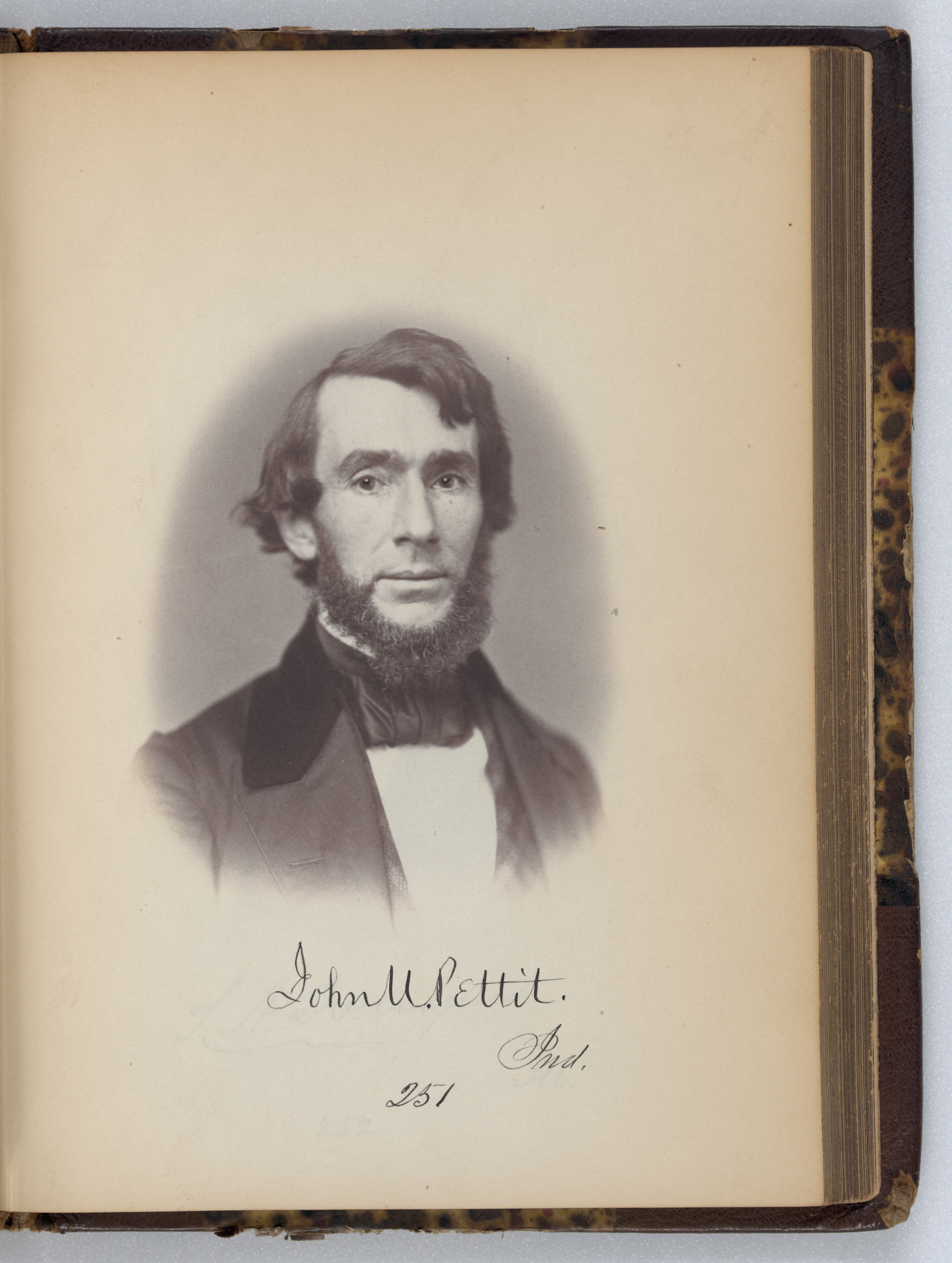
John U. Pettit, also one of the commanders of the 75th Indiana.

== Casualties ==
The regiment lost a total of 232 men during service; one officer (Capt William McGinniss D: Savanna GA) and 43 enlisted men killed or mortally wounded, two officers and 186 enlisted men died of disease.

== Commanders ==
- Colonel Milton Stapp Robinson

== See also ==
- List of Indiana Civil War regiments
- Indiana in the Civil War
