= James McHugh =

James McHugh may refer to:

- James McHugh (Gaelic footballer) (1964–2026), Irish Gaelic footballer
- James T. McHugh (1932–2000), American Roman Catholic bishop
- James M. McHugh (1899–1966), American World War II intelligence officer
- Jimmy McHugh (James Francis McHugh, 1894–1969), American composer
