= Otis Bridge =

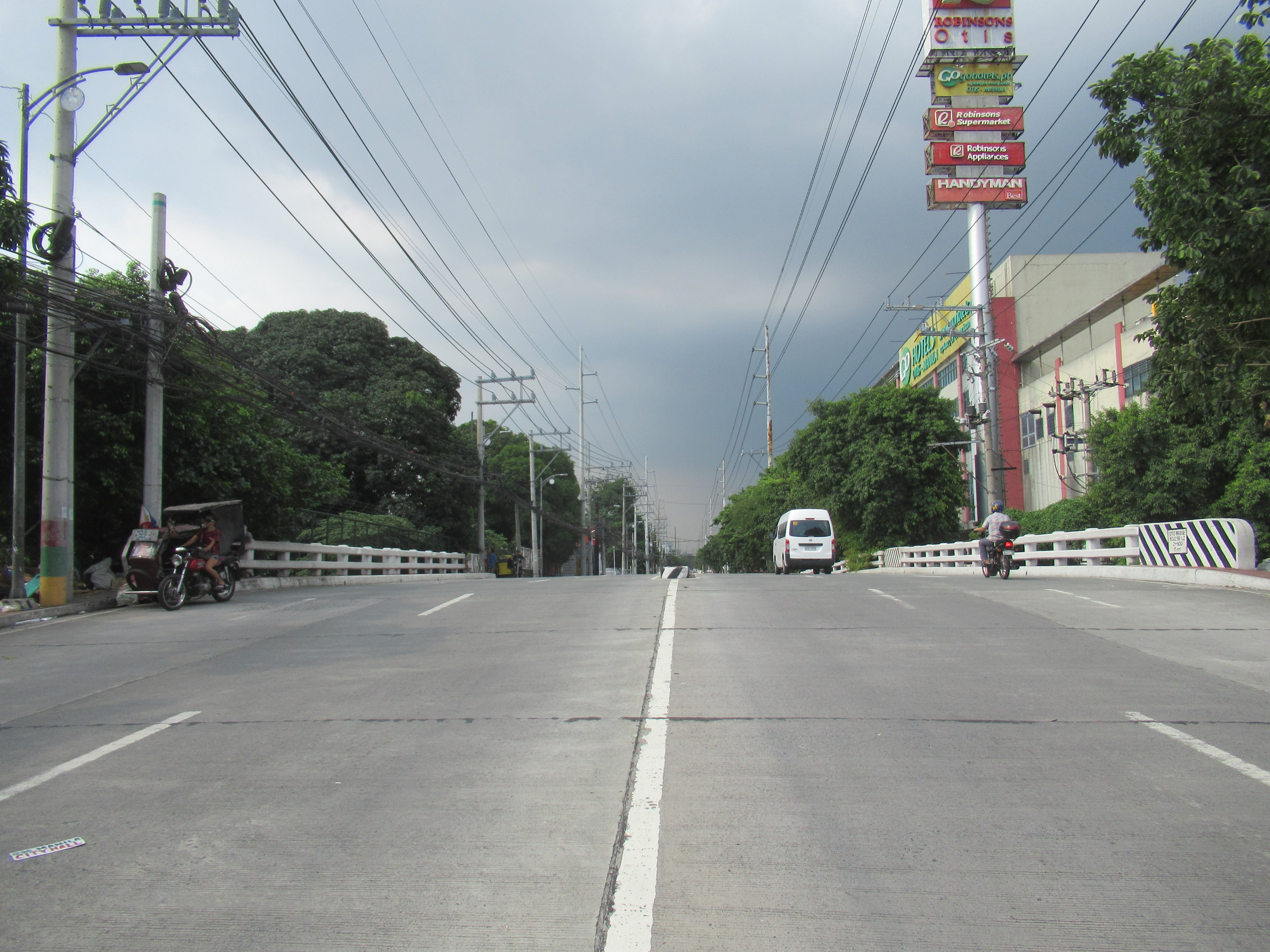
- View of the bridge northeastbound
- Coordinates: 14°35′12.4″N 120°59′41.7″E
- Carries: Vehicular traffic and pedestrians
- Crosses: Estero de Concordia
- Locale: Paco, Manila, Philippines
- Maintained by: Department of Public Works and Highways – South Manila District Engineering Office

Characteristics
- Design: Girder bridge
- Material: Concrete
- Total length: 80 m (260 ft)
- Width: 12 m (39 ft)
- No. of spans: 1
- Load limit: 15 metric tons (15,000 kg)
- No. of lanes: 6 (3 lanes per direction)

History
- Constructed by: Department of Public Works and Highways
- Opened: 1968 (original bridge); December 4, 2018 (new bridge)
- Rebuilt: 2015

Location
- Interactive map of Otis Bridge

The Otis Bridge is a six-lane girder bridge crossing the Estero de Concordia, a tributary of the Pasig River, in Manila, Philippines. Constructed in 1968, it carries Paz Mendoza Guazon Street, formerly known as Otis Street (named after the American Governor-General Elwell Stephen Otis). The bridge is a major artery for commercial vehicles carrying cargo from the Port of Manila, with around 10,000 trucks crossing the bridge daily.

In 2015, the bridge was slated for replacement or reconstruction as it neared the end of its 50-year service life, with ₱37,000,000 initially being allocated for construction work by the Department of Public Works and Highways (DPWH). However, on June 26, 2018, the bridge was ordered closed by the Metropolitan Manila Development Authority (MMDA) on the advice of the Manila Disaster Risk Reduction Management Council after media reports showed that 20-foot (6.1 m) long cracks started appearing along the center island, caused by the number of overloaded trucks that used the bridge, as well as construction work on the nearby Concordia Bridge which prevented its timely replacement.

The bridge was reopened on December 4, 2018, three months ahead of the March 2019 target date, with ₱217,000,000 being allocated from the national budget for its replacement. Construction took place 24/7 in phases until the project was completed.
