= William R. Myers =

American attorney, educator, and politician

William Ralph Myers

Member of the U.S. House of Representatives from Indiana's 6th district
- In office March 4, 1879 – March 4, 1881
- Preceded by: Milton S. Robinson
- Succeeded by: Thomas M. Browne

Secretary of State of Indiana
- In office January 16, 1883 – January 16, 1887
- Governor: Albert G. Porter; Isaac P. Gray
- Preceded by: Emanuel R. Hawn
- Succeeded by: Charles F. Griffin

Secretary of State of Indiana
- In office January 17, 1893 – January 17, 1895
- Governor: Claude Matthews
- Preceded by: Myron D. King
- Succeeded by: William D. Owen

Personal details
- Born: June 12, 1836 Wilmington, Ohio, U.S.
- Died: April 18, 1907 (aged 70) Anderson, Indiana, U.S.
- Resting place: East Maplewood Cemetery
- Party: Democratic

Military service
- Branch/service: Indiana Volunteer Infantry
- Battles/wars: American Civil War

William Ralph Myers (June 12, 1836 – April 18, 1907) was an American attorney, educator, and politician who served as the two-time Secretary of State of Indiana and a member of the United States House of Representatives from Indiana.

== Early life ==
Born near Wilmington, Ohio, Myers moved with his parents to Anderson, Indiana in October 1836. He attended public schools and later worked as a teacher. He was surveyor of Madison County from 1858 until 1860.

== Career ==
=== Military service ===
During the Civil War, he enlisted as a private in Company G, Forty-seventh Regiment of the Indiana Volunteer Infantry. He was promoted to orderly sergeant, second lieutenant, first lieutenant, and captain, and served four years and three months.

=== Teaching and legal career ===
After returning from the Army, Myers returned to teaching. He became Superintendent of the public schools of Anderson, Indiana in 1868 and 1869, and served as member of the school board of Anderson from 1871 to 1879. He studied law and was admitted to the bar in 1871. He established a private legal practice in Anderson.

=== Politics ===
Myers was elected as a Democrat to the Forty-sixth Congress (March 4, 1879 – March 3, 1881). He was an unsuccessful candidate for reelection in 1880 to the Forty-seventh Congress.

Myers served as Secretary of State of Indiana from 1882 to 1886. Afterwards, he purchased the newspaper The Anderson Democrat in 1886 and served as its editor. He ran an unsuccessful campaign for the Democratic nomination for Governor of Indiana, but would later become Secretary of State for a second time from 1892 to 1894. He resumed the practice of law thereafter.

== Death ==
Myers died in Anderson, Indiana on April 18, 1907. He was interred in East Maplewood Cemetery.

U.S. House of Representatives
Preceded by Milton S. Robinson	Member of the U.S. House of Representatives from Indiana's 6th congressional district 1879–1881	Succeeded by Thomas M. Browne
Political offices
Preceded by Emanuel R. Hawn	Secretary of State of Indiana; 1883–1887	Succeeded by Charles F. Griffin
Preceded by Myron D. King	Secretary of State of Indiana; 1893–1895	Succeeded by William D. Owen
