= Schurman Commission =

US Commission from 1899 to 1900

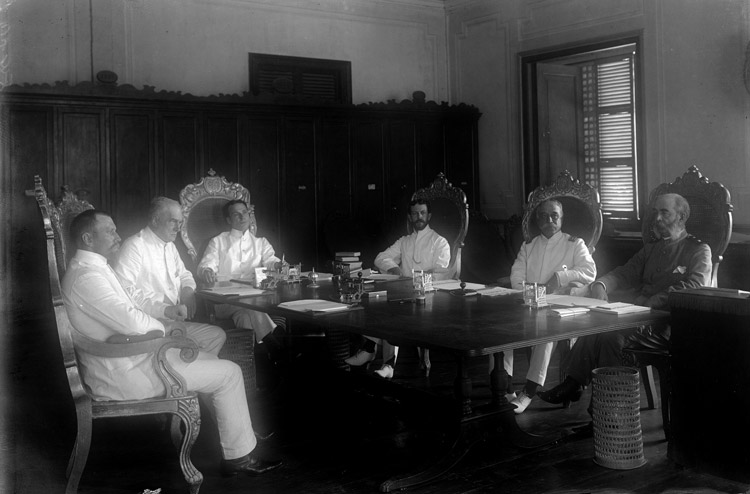
Composition of the Schurman Commission. From left to right: Mr. Dean C. Worcester, Colonel Charles Denby, Jacob G. Schurman (president), Mr. John R. MacArthur (secretary), Admiral George Dewey and General E. S. Otis

The Schurman Commission, also known as the First Philippine Commission, was established by United States President William McKinley on January 20, 1899, and tasked to study the situation in the Philippines and make recommendations on how the U.S. should proceed after the sovereignty of the Philippines was ceded to the U.S. by Spain on December 10, 1898, following the 1898 Treaty of Paris.

Its final report was submitted on January 3, 1900, and recommended the establishment of a civil government having a bicameral legislature and being financially independent from the U.S. The report also recommended the establishment of a system of public education. Following on this report, President McKinley established the Taft Commission, also known as the Second Philippine Commission on March 16, 1900.

== Background ==
On January 20, 1899, President William McKinley appointed the First Philippine Commission (the Schurman Commission), a five-person group headed by Dr. Jacob Schurman, president of Cornell University, to investigate conditions in the islands and make recommendations. In the report that they issued to the president the following year, the commissioners acknowledged Filipino aspirations for independence. (Note: When offered the presidency of the commission he replied, "To be plain, Mr. President, I am opposed to your Philippine policy. I never wanted the Philippines.", to which President McKinley replied, "Oh, that need not trouble you; I did not want the Philippines either, and in the protocol of the treaty I kept myself free not to take them, but in the end there was no alternative.") They declared, however, that the Philippines was not ready for it.

Specific recommendations included the establishment of civilian government as rapidly as possible (the American chief executive in the islands at that time was the military governor), including establishment of a bicameral legislature, autonomous governments on the provincial and municipal levels, and a system of free public elementary schools.

== Leadership ==
- President:

Jacob Gould Schurman

== Members ==
- Members:

Member	Appointed	Administrative office
Jacob G. Schurman	1899	Head of the Commission
George Dewey	1899	Admiral of the United States Navy
Charles H. Denby	1899	Former Minister to China
Elwell S. Otis	1899	Military Governor
Dean C. Worcester	1899	Philippines Affairs Expert

== Survey visit to the Philippines ==
The three civilian members of the commission arrived in Manila on March 4, 1899, a month after the Battle of Manila, which had begun armed conflict between U.S. forces and Filipino forces under Emilio Aguinaldo. General Otis viewed the arrival of his fellow commission members as an intrusion and boycotted commission meetings. The commission spent a month meeting with Ilustrados who had deserted Aguinaldo's Malolos Republic government and studying the Malolos Constitution and other documents of Aguinaldo's revolutionary government. Meanwhile, with U.S. forces under Otis advancing northwards from Manila, the seat of Aguinaldo's revolutionary government had been moved from Malolos to new headquarters in San Isidro, Nueva Ecija. When Malolos fell at the end of March, it was moved further north to San Fernando, Pampanga.

The commission published a proclamation containing assurances that the U.S. did not intend exploitation of Filipinos, but their "advancement to a position among the most civilized peoples of the world", and announced "that the United States is ... anxious to establish in the Philippine Islands an enlightened system of government under which the Philippine people may enjoy the largest measure of home rule and the amplest liberty." The revolutionary government counterproposed a three-month armistice during which representatives of the two governments would meet and arrange terms for the settlement of the war. President McKinley's instructions to the Commission issued in Washington before the outbreak of hostilities had not authorized it to discuss an armistice.

In April, the commission met with Colonel Manuel Arguelles, an emissary from the insurgents, who requested a suspension of hostilities. The commission explained that it had no power to arrange that, and such a request would need to be put to General Otis but, in fact, hostilities were suspended as long as insurgent representatives were within American lines. After some discussions, Arguelles left and returned with a letter from Mabini expressing continuing confidence in the "friendship, justice, and magnanimity of the North American nation", expressing a desire to seek peace, and requesting that a commission with full power to negotiate be appointed. This convinced the commission that Filipinos wanted concrete information on the governmental role they would be allowed to play, and the commission requested authorization from McKinley to offer a specific plan. McKinley responded as follows:

Washington, May 6, 1899--10:20 p.m.
Yours 4th received. You are authorized to propose that under the military power of the President, pending action of Congress, government of the Philippine Islands shall consist of a Governor-General appointed by the President; Cabinet appointed by the Governor-General; a general advisory council elected by the people; the qualifications of electors to be carefully considered and determined; and the governor-general to have absolute veto. Judiciary strong and independent; principal judges appointed by the President. The cabinet and judges to be chosen from natives and Americans, or both, having regard to fitness. The President earnestly desires cessation of bloodshed, and that the people of the Philippines Islands at an early date shall have the largest measure of local self-government consistent with peace and good order.

Arguelles said that, in his opinion, the plan would meet much approval.

A session of the Revolutionary Congress convened by Aguinaldo voted unanimously to cease fighting and accept peace based on McKinley's proposal as reported by Arguelles. The revolutionary cabinet headed by Apolinario Mabini was replaced on May 8 by a new "peace" cabinet headed by Pedro Paterno and Felipe Buencamino. After a meeting of the Revolutionary Congress and military commanders, Aguinaldo advised the commission that he was being advised by a new cabinet "which is more moderate and conciliatory", and appointed a delegation to meet with the commission. At this point, General Antonio Luna, field commander of the revolutionary army, arrested Paterno and most of his cabinet. On his return, Arguelles was accused of having become an Americanista, expelled from the army, and sentenced to twelve years of imprisonment.

Arguelles was replaced as Aguinaldo's representative by new emissaries who after meeting with the Commission on May 19, said that they had larger powers than what Arguelles had, discussed the Commission proclamation and proposal in detail, and departed. The Commission was given to understand that they would return in three weeks, but they did not return.

Following these developments, Aguinaldo withdrew his support from the "peace" cabinet, and Mabini and his cabinet returned to power. Schurman, after proposing unsuccessfully to the commission that they urge McKinley to revise his plan to enlarge Filipino participation, cabled the suggestion to the President as his own. McKinley instructed Secretary of State John Hay to cable Schurman that he wanted peace "preferably by kindness and conciliation," but the preference was contradicted by a threat to "send all the force necessary to suppress the insurrection if Filipino resistance continued." McKinley also polled the other commission members, receiving a response that "indecision now would be fatal" and urging "prosecution of the war until the insurgents submit."

== Conclusions ==
The commission concluded that "the United States cannot withdraw. ... We are there and duty binds us to remain. The Filipinos are wholly unprepared for independence ... there being no Philippine nation, but only a collection of different peoples."

In the report that they issued to the president the following year, the commissioners acknowledged Filipino aspirations for independence; they declared, however, that the Philippines was not ready for it. On November 2, 1899, The commission issued a preliminary report containing the following statement:

Should our power by any fatality be withdrawn, the commission believe that the government of the Philippines would speedily lapse into anarchy, which would excuse, if it did not necessitate, the intervention of other powers and the eventual division of the islands among them. Only through American occupation, therefore, is the idea of a free, self-governing, and united Philippine commonwealth at all conceivable. And the indispensable need from the Filipino point of view of maintaining American sovereignty over the archipelago is recognized by all intelligent Filipinos and even by those insurgents who desire an American protectorate. The latter, it is true, would take the revenues and leave us the responsibilities. Nevertheless, they recognize the indubitable fact that the Filipinos cannot stand alone. Thus the welfare of the Filipinos coincides with the dictates of national honour in forbidding our abandonment of the archipelago. We cannot from any point of view escape the responsibilities of government which our sovereignty entails; and the commission is strongly persuaded that the performance of our national duty will prove the greatest blessing to the peoples of the Philippine Islands.

Specific recommendations included the establishment of civilian government as rapidly as possible (the American chief executive in the islands at that time was the military governor), including establishment of a bicameral legislature, autonomous governments on the provincial and municipal levels, and a system of free public elementary schools.

== See also ==
- Congress of the Philippines
- Senate of the Philippines
- House of Representatives of the Philippines
