= James M. McHugh =

James Marshall McHugh (27 December 1899 – 7 November 1966) was an American intelligence officer in China.

McHugh was born in Nevada, Missouri and graduated from the U.S. Naval Academy in 1922. Following training at Quantico he went to China in 1923 to study the country and its language. He was married to Dorothy Schurman Hawes from 1926 to 1940; her father, Jacob Gould Schurman, was president of Cornell University from 1892–1920, and was American minister to China in the 1920s.

== Career ==
McHugh spent over twenty years in China, where he served as intelligence officer for the 4th Marines and U.S. Asiatic Fleet, Shanghai, from 1933–1935, became special Assistant Naval Attaché, American Embassy at Nanjing, Hankou, and Chongqing. He was Naval Attaché and Naval Attaché for Air from 1940–1943, serving as a special representative of Secretary of the Navy Frank Knox to Generalissimo Chiang Kai-shek, with whom he was a close friend.

For his work in this capacity he was awarded the Legion of Merit. He was officer in charge of the Far East Secret Intelligence and served on the staff of the Fifth Amphibious Corps (G-5), was sent to Guam in 1944 to help plan the attack on Iwo Jima. An attack of malaria led to his recall in 1943; after which he was assigned to Navy Department, to one of the forerunners of the present CIA.

In October 1942, McHugh encouraged Chiang Kai-shek to seek the replacement of Joseph Stilwell with Claire Lee Chennault. While returning to the United States, McHugh visited Archibald Wavell, criticized Stilwell severely, and spoke favorably of Chennault's claim that Japan could be defeated by a small American air force based in China. This infuriated George Marshall, the Army Chief of Staff, who believed that McHugh's indiscretion irreparably damaged the American war strategy in southeast Asia and China.

== Later life ==
After retirement in 1946, he was an economic consultant for corporations having interest in the Far East, including Jardine, Matheson & Co. (Hong Kong), and Balfour, Guthrie & Co. (New York).

== See also ==
- Guide to the James M. McHugh Papers, 1930-1965
