= Milton S. Robinson =

American politician (1832–1892)

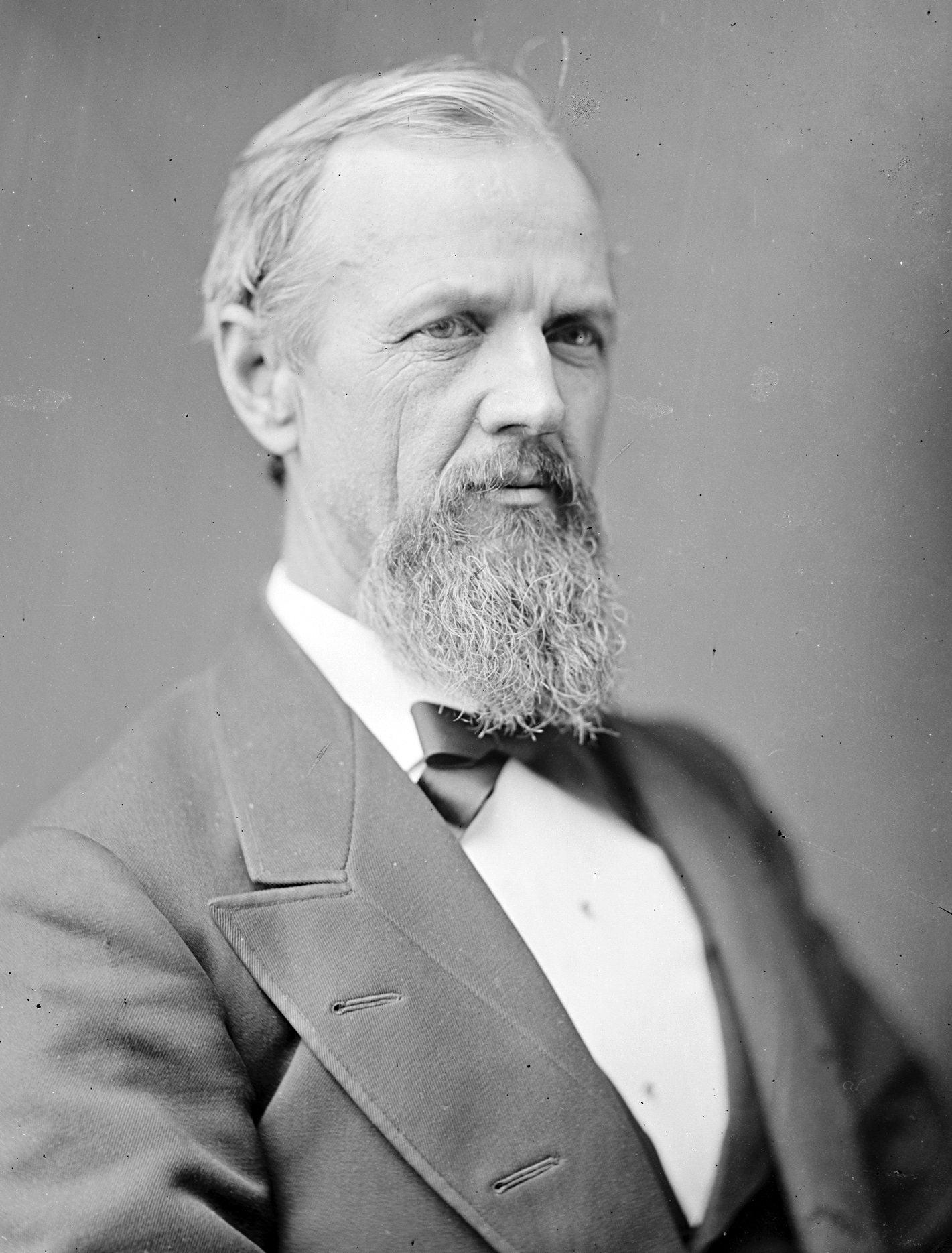
- Born: April 20, 1832; Versailles, Indiana
- Died: July 28, 1892 (aged 60); Anderson, Indiana
- Burial place: Maplewood Cemetery, Anderson, Indiana
- Military career
- Allegiance: United States of America; Union
- Branch: United States Army; Union Army
- Service years: 1861–1865
- Rank: Colonel; Brevet Brigadier General
- Commands: 75th Indiana Infantry Regiment; 2nd Brigade, 4th Division, XIV Corps
- Conflicts: American Civil War
- Other work: Congressman, lawyer, judge

Milton Stapp Robinson (April 20, 1832 – July 28, 1892) was an Indiana lawyer, politician, judge, and soldier. He was a brigade commander in the Union Army during the American Civil War and a reconstruction era U.S. Representative, serving two terms from 1875 to 1879.

== Biography ==
=== Civil War ===
During the Civil War, he entered the Union Army in September 1861 as the lieutenant colonel of the 47th Indiana Infantry. Soon he was promoted to colonel of the 75th Indiana Infantry, which he led during the December 1862 Battle of Stones River near Murfreesboro, Tennessee. Robinson then commanded the 2nd Brigade, 4th Division of the XIV Corps at the September 1863 Battle of Chickamauga. He was brevetted as a brigadier general in the omnibus promotions at the end of the war, dating from March 13, 1865.

=== Early political career ===
After the war, he served in the Indiana State Senate 1866–1870. He was delegate to the 1872 Republican National Convention.

=== Congress ===
Robinson was elected as a Republican to the Forty-fourth and Forty-fifth Congresses (March 4, 1875 – March 3, 1879). He was not a candidate for renomination in 1878 and resumed the practice of law in Madison County, Indiana.

=== Judicial career ===
Robinson was appointed associate justice of the appellate court of Indiana in March 1891. He was subsequently appointed chief justice and served until his death.

== Death and burial ==
He died in Anderson, Indiana, on July 28, 1892, and was interred in Maplewood Cemetery.

U.S. House of Representatives
Preceded by Morton C. Hunter	Member of the U.S. House of Representatives from Indiana's 6th congressional district 1875–1879	Succeeded by William R. Myers
