= Joseph Sweetman Ames =

American physicist and academic (1864–1943)

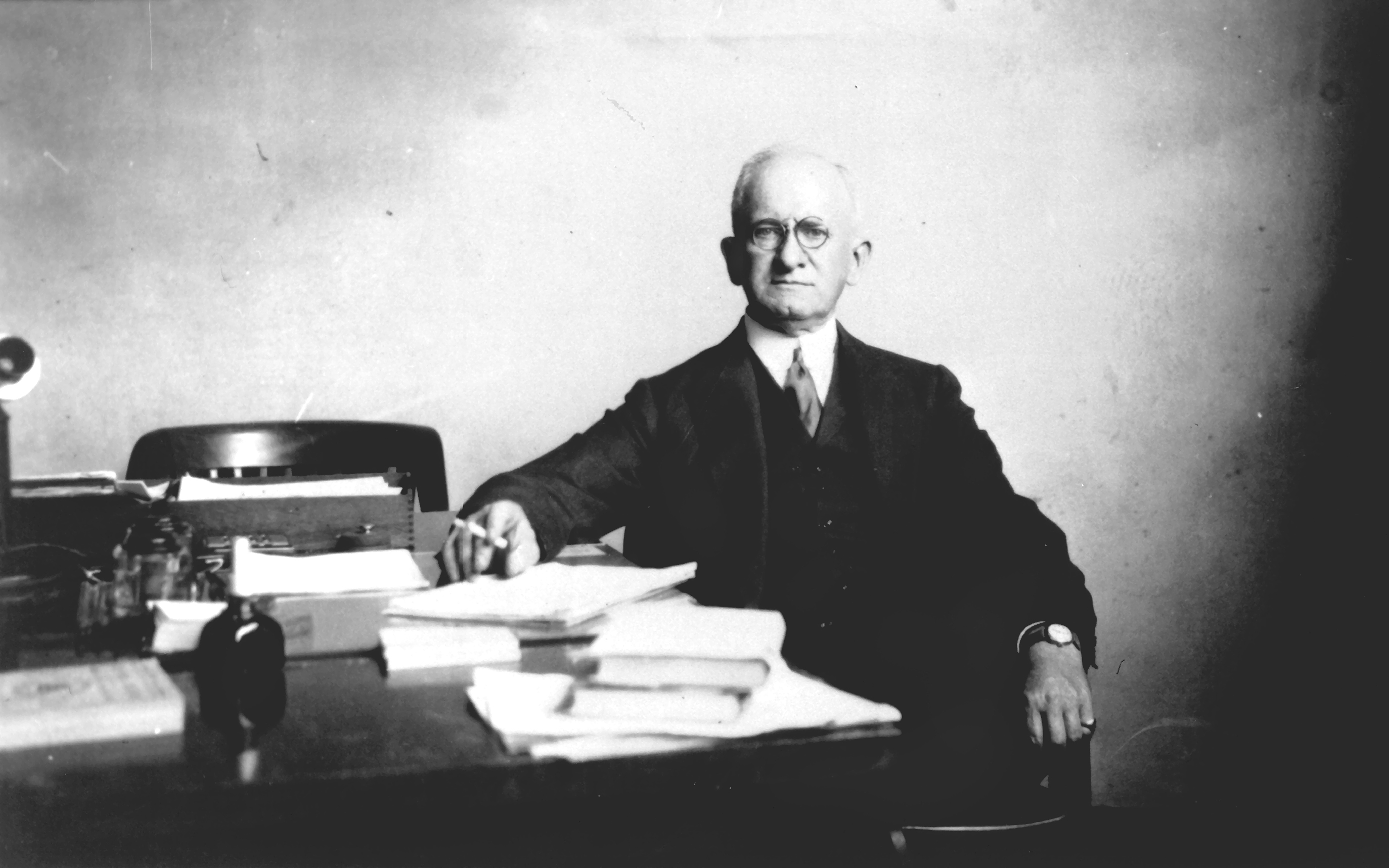

President of Johns Hopkins University
- Succeeded by: Isaiah Bowman
- Preceded by: Frank Johnson Goodnow

Personal details
- Born: July 3, 1864 Manchester, Vermont, United States
- Died: June 24, 1943 (aged 78)
- Education: Johns Hopkins University
- Profession: Academic administrator, educator, physicist, author
- Scientific career
- Doctoral students: Albert Francis Zahm

Joseph Sweetman Ames (July 3, 1864 – June 24, 1943) was an American physicist, professor at Johns Hopkins University, provost of the university from 1926 to 1929, and university president from 1929 to 1935. He is best remembered as one of the founding members of the National Advisory Committee for Aeronautics (NACA, the predecessor of NASA) and its longtime chairman (1919–1939). NASA Ames Research Center is named after him. He was elected to the American Philosophical Society in 1905 and the United States National Academy of Sciences in 1909. He was elected a Fellow of the American Academy of Arts and Sciences in 1911. He was the 1935 recipient of the Langley Gold Medal from the Smithsonian Institution.

Ames was also an assistant editor of The Astrophysical Journal and associate editor of the American Journal of Science; editor-in-chief of the Scientific Memoir Series; and editor of Joseph von Fraunhofer's memoirs on Prismatic and Diffractive Spectra (1898).

== Career ==
Joseph Sweetman Ames was born in Manchester, Vermont on July 3, 1864. Ames was the son of George Lapham Ames and Elizabeth (Bacon) Ames and a descendant of the Ames and Bacon families of Connecticut. His family moved to Minnesota when he was a young boy and he attended the Shattuck School, where he showed a special interest in mathematics. When he arrived at Hopkins as a freshman in 1883, he began a lifelong affiliation of sixty years, with only a year's hiatus after his graduation in 1886 (the undergraduate curriculum was then three years). After traveling in Europe and attending Helmholtz's lectures at the University of Berlin, he returned to Hopkins in 1887 to study physics under Henry A. Rowland. He earned his PhD in 1890. As a graduate student, he served as a laboratory assistant and he continued to do so until promoted to associate [equivalent to assistant professor] in 1891. In 1893 he became associate professor, and Professor of Physics in 1898. Ames was elected an honorary member of the Royal Institution of Great Britain in 1899. Upon Rowland's death in 1901, he was appointed Director of the Physics Laboratory.

Ames contributed to his field by publishing four textbooks, serving on the editorial staff of the Astrophysical Journal and Harper's Scientific Monthly, delivering Northwestern University's Harris Lectures on "The Constitution of Matter", co-authoring a book, Theoretical Mechanics, and holding the office of president of the American Physical Society, of which he was a charter member. His expertise also led to his being called to chair the Foreign Service Committee of the National Research Council, to direct the educational work of the United States Bureau of Standards, to lead a wartime scientific mission to France, and to head the executive committee of the National Advisory Committee for Aeronautics (NACA), predecessor to the National Aeronautics and Space Administration (NASA).

As a faculty member, Ames was considered an excellent teacher, able to explain complex principles of physics in terms a lay person could understand. Whereas Rowland was known for delivering lectures that prompted more questions than they answered, Ames' lectures displayed a mastery of the subject that was frequently commented on favorably by students and colleagues. Both as a teacher and an administrator Ames supported academic freedom and objected to loyalty oaths then required of teachers in many states.

Ames at the Fourth Conference International Union for Cooperation in Solar Research at Mount Wilson Observatory, 1910

At Hopkins, his gift for administration led to his becoming secretary of the Academic Council in 1915, Dean of the College Faculty in 1924, and Provost in 1926. In 1929, when the university searched for a new president, Ames was appointed. He assumed office July 1, 1929 and commenced an administration which spanned six of the most difficult years in the university's history, due to the economic hardships of the Great Depression. The university's deficit grew as the general financial picture worsened. President Ames managed the university as efficiently as possible, coping with problems such as the "Goodnow Plan" and the new but troubled Institute of Law. He even dealt with the question of commercialism in Hopkins athletics, maintaining that charging admission to athletic events was "improper". Shortly after his retirement on June 30, 1935, gate receipts were abolished. Many years later, this action was reversed and admission charges re-instituted. During his Hopkins presidency, the William H. Welch Medical Library opened on the university's medical campus, and the Walter Hines Page School of International Relations was organized as a division of the university.

When the Second World War began, as chair of the Foreign Service Committee of the National Research Council, Ames toured Europe studying scientific developments. Upon his return, he criticized the United States’ isolationist foreign policy, urging that war materials be sent to France as quickly as possible. He also urged that the United States immediately speed up development and production of warplanes.

Towards the end of his life, Ames’ work in aviation gained further recognition. In 1935, he was made an honorary fellow of the Institute of Aeronautical Sciences and received from the Smithsonian Institution the Langley Gold Medal for Aerodynamics. In 1939, the National Advisory Committee for Aeronautics presented him with a testimonial resolution. Perhaps the greatest honor bestowed on him was the naming of the Ames Aeronautical Laboratory in California. Ames died on June 24, 1943, after being in failing health for several years due to a stroke.

== Publications ==
- 1897: The Theory of Physics ISBN 978-1-112-24574-9
- 1898: A Manual of Experiments in Physics at Internet Archive
- 1898: The Free Expansion of Gases at Internet Archive
- 1900: Elements of Physics ISBN 978-1-172-27730-8
- 1900: The Induction of Electric Currents (two volumes)
- 1904: Text-Book of General Physics via Internet Archive
- 1929: Theoretical Mechanics
