= Frank Johnson Goodnow =

American legal scholar (1859–1939)

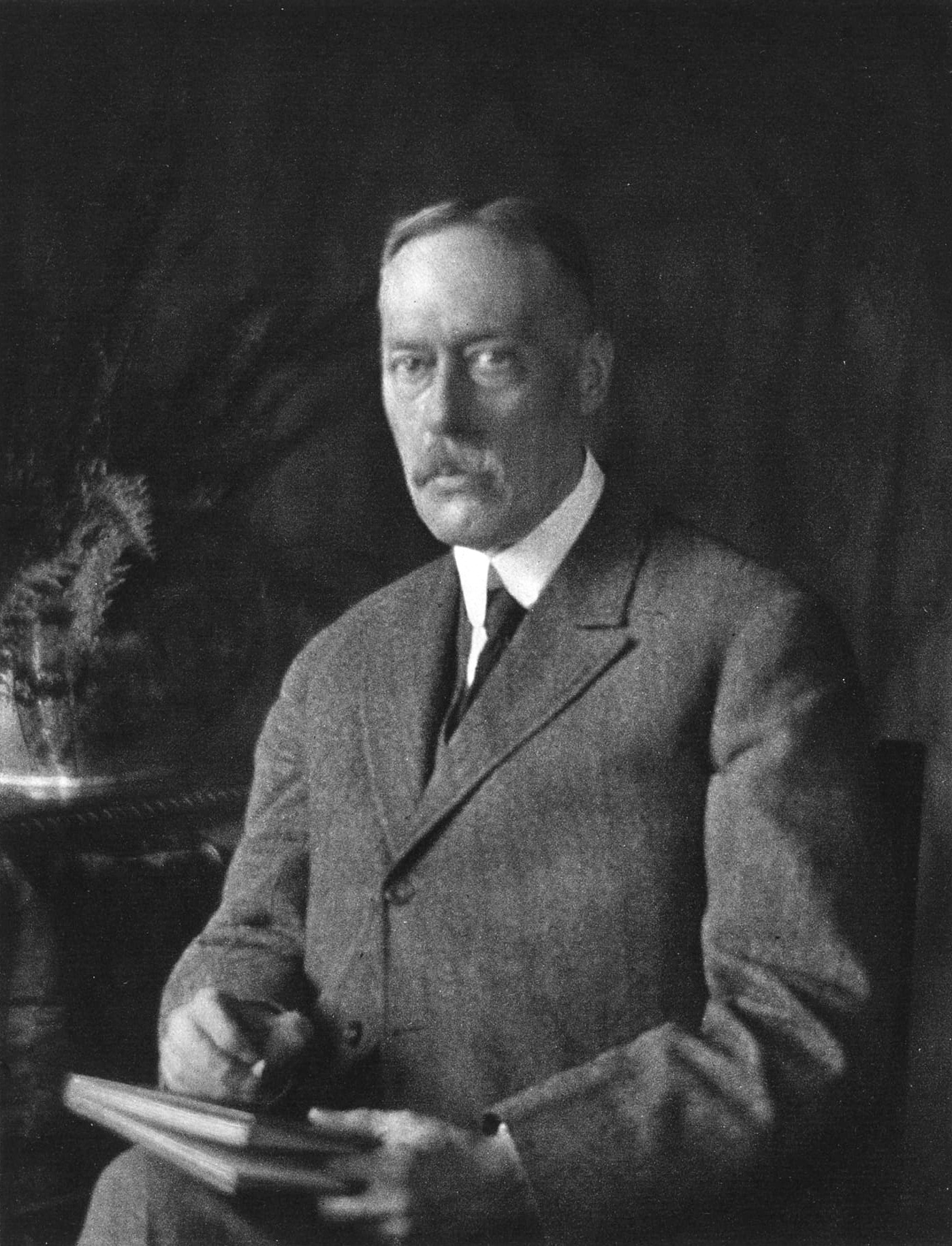
- Born: Frank Johnson Goodnow; 18 January 1859; New York City, US
- Died: 15 November 1939 (aged 80)
- Occupation: President of Johns Hopkins University
- Years active: 1893–1914
- Spouse: Elizabeth Buchanan (m. 1886–1939)
- Children: 3

Academic background
- Education: Amherst College (1879); Columbia University (LL.B., 1882)
- Influences: Johann Kaspar Bluntschli, Francis Lieber, Lorenz von Stein

Academic work
- Influenced: Charles A. Beard

Signature
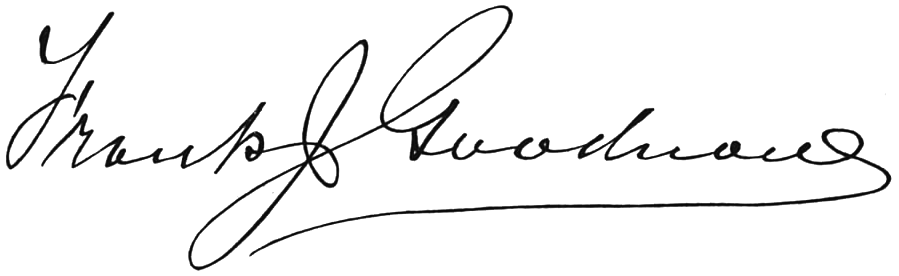

Frank Johnson Goodnow (January 18, 1859 – November 15, 1939) was an American educator and legal scholar. He was the first president of the American Political Science Association and an elected member of both the American Academy of Arts and Sciences and the American Philosophical Society. He worked as an advisor to Yuan Shikai.

== Personal life ==
He married Elizabeth Lyall (1861–1942) in 1886 and had 3 children: Isabel C. (Mrs. E. Kendall Gillett), David F. and Lois R. (Mrs. John V. A. MacMurray).

== Early life and education ==
He was born in Brooklyn, New York.

After private schooling he graduated from Amherst College (AB) in 1879 and from Columbia Law School (LLB) in 1882. At Columbia, in addition to such subjects essential for admission to the Bar, he took courses in public law and jurisprudence offered in the recently organized School of Political Science. Late in 1882 he was offered a position in the School of Political Science on the condition that he prepare himself with a year of study abroad. He studied at the Ecole Libre des Sciences Politiques in Paris and at the University of Berlin.

== Career ==
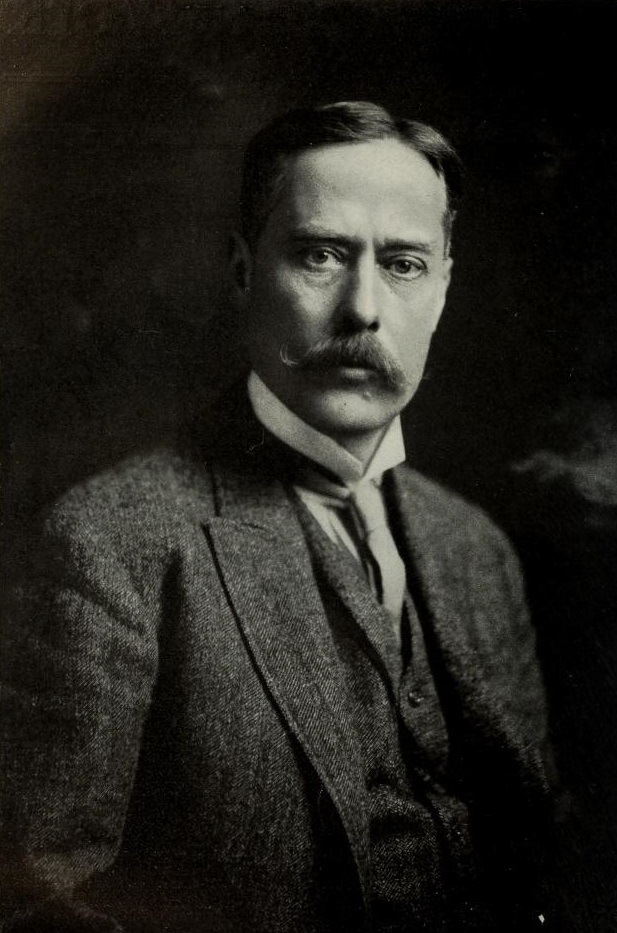
Frank Johnson Goodnow

Goodnow took up his teaching in October 1884 at Columbia, giving some instruction in History as well as in United States Administrative Law.

Made Adjunct Professor in 1887, Goodnow became Professor of Administrative Law in 1891, and in 1903 Eaton Professor of Administrative Law and Municipal Science. He became the first president of the American Political Science Association in 1903. Governor Theodore Roosevelt made him a member of the commission to draft a new charter for Greater New York, and President Taft chose him as a member of his Commission on Economy and Efficiency.

In 1914 he became the third president of Johns Hopkins University. At Hopkins, he is best remembered for his attempt to eliminate the bachelor's degree by cutting the first two years of undergraduate work. Called the Goodnow Plan or New Plan, students would have entered Hopkins after two years of study in other universities and would have worked toward an advanced degree, bypassing the bachelor's degree. (similar to the role of Senior Colleges) Although briefly implemented, the plan failed, largely because of the difficulty of persuading enough students to transfer to Hopkins halfway through their college education. The plan was attempted again in substantially the same form, in the early 1950s, under President Detlev W. Bronk, meeting with the same lack of success. Known as a good financial manager, Goodnow greatly increased the university's income during his fifteen-year presidency.

Goodnow resigned the Johns Hopkins University presidency in 1929 and was succeeded by Joseph Sweetman Ames, but thereafter frequently gave graduate lectures in his special subjects. He was for some time a regent of the University of Maryland and a member of the Board of School Commissioners of Baltimore.

== Public administration ==
Goodnow is considered an important early scholar in the field of public administration and administrative law, as well as an expert in government. Goodnow argued for the centrality of law in public administration. (Other public administration theorists have argued that other non-legal values ought to guide civil servants.) His first book, Comparative Administrative Law: An Analysis of the Administrative Systems, National and Local, of the United States, England France and Germany (1893) brought two important contributions to the emerging field of political science. It was one of the first systematic studies of public administration and a pioneer work in the United States for the use of a comparative method of inquiry.

His most influential work Politics and Administration: A Study in Government was published in 1900 and triggered a long lasting controversy. Goodnow was also a well-known and influential Progressive, authoring a critical view of America's founding principles in his 1916 essay: The American Conception of Liberty. Influenced by previous studies by Woodrow Wilson, Goodnow carved a dichotomy between two distinct functions of government, politics as the sphere that “as to do with the guiding or influencing of governmental policy” and administration as the sphere that “has to do with the execution of that policy”. The distinction was severely criticized by Dwight Waldo in his Study of the Administration (1955) but later rehabilitated by scholars who argue that Goodnow intended the distinction as a “typological” one, useful for analytical purposes.

== Imperialism and racial theory ==
Goodnow supported the development of an American empire after the Spanish-American War of 1898. In 1900, he began teaching a course on "The History and Principles of Colonial Administration" at Columbia University, "to meet the demands occasioned by the new position assumed by the United States" by educating "those who desire to serve the country in its new possessions." The course was offered at Columbia University until 1911. Goodnow may have intended to publish a textbook on the principles of colonial administration. A working manuscript, almost five hundred pages long, is preserved among his papers. There are also shorter manuscripts on the governance of dependencies and "race relations." He traveled to the dependencies, corresponded with colonial officials, and reviewed books on colonial administration by American and European scholars.

Goodnow's course at Columbia University and the accompanying manuscript were concerned with principles for the design of "administrative systems" in the dependencies. He distinguished between "colonies of occupation" – those in temperate climates suitable for white settlement – and "colonies of production" that were established mainly for trade or extraction of raw materials. In colonies of settlement, Goodnow said, there was "no need of determining the question of how shall the native races be treated, inasmuch as that question is settled . . . by the admission of the fact that the native races will be destroyed." In colonies of production, like the Philippines, the handling of "native races" was more complicated. Democratic principles had to be put aside, because natives were not ready for self-rule. It would be "futile . . . to treat the Filipinos as anything but a dependent race," Goodnow said, "which must for long years be denied any great share in the government of the islands."

Goodnow believed that humanity was divided by color and degree of civilization, and that there was competition among races. The white race, he said, had reached the highest stage of civilization, mainly through its mastery of science and technology. He considered the peoples of India, China and Japan as less advanced but still with some degree of civilization, while in South America "interbreeding" had produced "a new race . . . vastly superior to the Indian race as the Spaniards found it." In the rest of the world, however, the "colored races" sometimes lived "in the depths of barbarism." In a 1921 paper, Goodnow worried about the "rising tide of color." He was concerned that whites were already outnumbered, other races were growing more rapidly, and colonization itself was improving the ability of other races to challenge white domination.

Goodnow conceded that colonization served the economic interests of white countries. But he quoted Rudyard Kipling and wrote about "the white man's burden"—the "duty or destiny" to bring "a higher and a better civilization" to "our less fortunate brothers." In the Philippines, Goodnow said that it would be misguided to "treat the Filipino as if he were a white man with centuries of experience and achievement back of him." He said that imperial states would be justified in applying "paternal and even despotic methods of government" in the process of spreading civilization.

=== Segregation at Johns Hopkins University ===
In November 1925, W.E.B. Du Bois wrote to Goodnow, then president of Johns Hopkins University, requesting confirmation of a report that Black students had been ejected from an extension course offered by the university. One day later, Goodnow replied to Du Bois, stating that he intended to enforce "the educational policy of the State [of Maryland] . . . [which] is the segregation of all races in all the schools of the State." Du Bois replied four days later, urging Goodnow not to "surrender to provincialism and race discrimination.". There is no record of a response from Goodnow.

== Constitutional advisor in China ==
Goodnow also worked in China. In October 1912 he accepted, on the recommendation of the Carnegie Endowment for International Peace, the commission of constitutional adviser to the Republic of China which took him to China in March 1913. During the years 1913–1914 he served as legal adviser to the Yuan Shikai's government. Yuan had hired Goodnow at the recommendation of Charles Eliot, a former president of Harvard University, and had tasked him with drafting a new constitution. Between 1913 and 1915, Goodnow wrote two versions of the constitution. The first effectively made Yuan president for life, and granted him sweeping powers over the budget and foreign policy. The second version, completed in 1915, would have made Yuan emperor had he not died soon thereafter.

Goodnow became known for his assertion that the Chinese people were not mature enough for a democratic form of government—a position that was later utilized by Yuan, as he attempted to proclaim himself the Emperor of China in 1915–1916. Goodnow claimed that there was "an almost complete absence in the minds of the Chinese people of the idea of individual rights" and that "absolutist government" was a necessity: "It is useless to expect that a political organization based upon conditions of the West can be advantageously adopted in China." Although Goodnow believed it was beneficial for China to be led by a political strongman, he also contended that any change in its government should be based on a constitution.

Goodnow's work in China helped convey Western legal thinking to the country. He also kept the American government and elite circles apprised of developments in China.

== Legacy ==
The American Political Science Association established the Frank J. Goodnow Award for Distinguished Service in 1996.

== Bibliography ==
- Comparative administrative Law (1893)
- Municipal Problems (1897)
- Politics and Administration (1900)
- City Government in the United States (1905)
- Principles of the Administrative Laws of the United States (1905)
- Social Reform and the Constitution (1911)
- Principles of Constitutional Government (1916)
- The American Conception of Liberty (1916)

He was editor of:

- Selected Cases on the Law of Taxation (1905)
- Selected Cases on Government and Administration (1906)
- Social Reforms and the Constitution (1914)
