= John Van Antwerp MacMurray =

American diplomat (1881–1960)

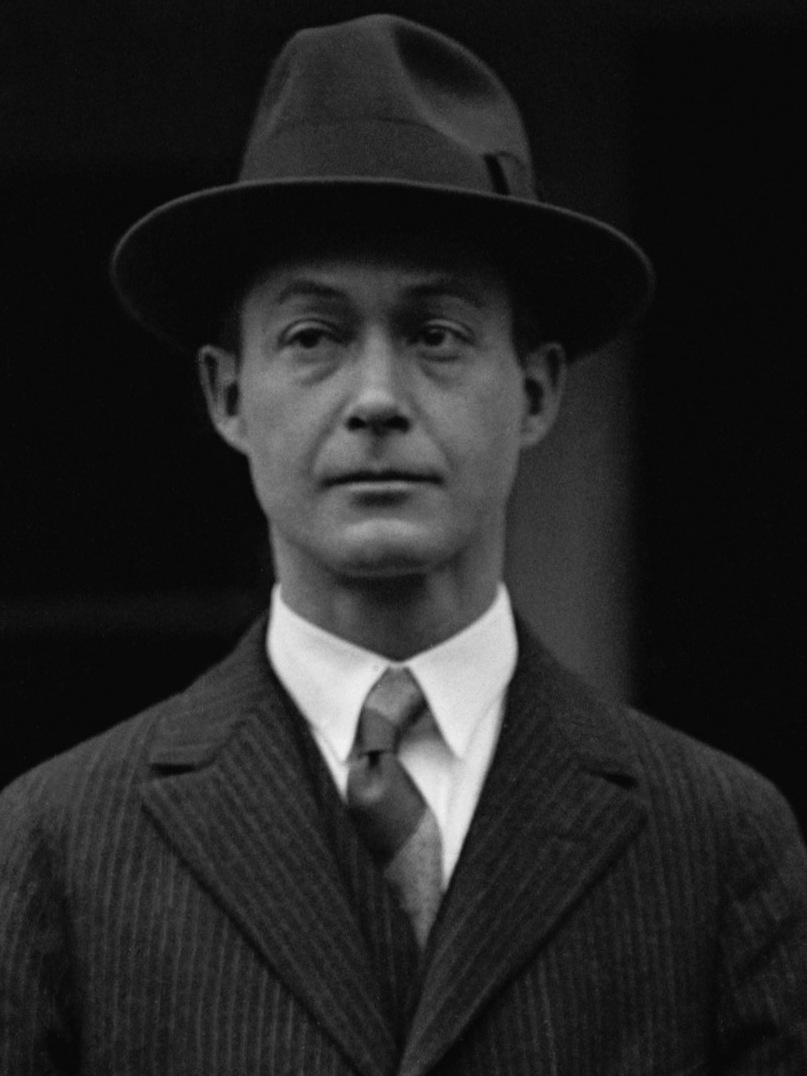
- MacMurray in November 1924

9th United States Ambassador to Turkey
- In office March 16, 1936 – November 28, 1941
- President: Franklin D. Roosevelt
- Preceded by: Robert Peet Skinner
- Succeeded by: Laurence Steinhardt

United States Minister to Lithuania
- In office January 4, 1934 – February 12, 1936
- President: Franklin D. Roosevelt
- Preceded by: Robert Peet Skinner
- Succeeded by: Arthur Bliss Lane

United States Minister to Estonia
- In office January 4, 1934 – February 12, 1936
- President: Franklin D. Roosevelt
- Preceded by: Robert Peet Skinner
- Succeeded by: Arthur Bliss Lane

United States Minister to Latvia
- In office December 13, 1933 – February 12, 1936
- President: Franklin D. Roosevelt
- Preceded by: Robert Peet Skinner
- Succeeded by: Arthur Bliss Lane

United States Minister to China
- In office July 15, 1925 – November 22, 1929
- President: Calvin Coolidge; Herbert Hoover
- Preceded by: Jacob Gould Schurman
- Succeeded by: Nelson Trusler Johnson

United States Assistant Secretary of State
- In office November 19, 1924 – May 19, 1925

Personal details
- Born: October 6, 1881 Schenectady, New York, United States
- Died: September 25, 1960 (aged 78) Norfolk, Connecticut
- Spouse: Lois R. Goodnow
- Children: 3
- Education: Princeton University (B.A., M.A.); Columbia University Law School (LL.B.)
- Occupation: Diplomat

John Van Antwerp MacMurray (October 6, 1881 – September 25, 1960) was an American attorney, author and diplomat best known as one of the leading China experts in the U.S. government. He served as Assistant Secretary of State from November 1924 to May 1925, and was subsequently appointed Minister to the Republic of China in 1925. Although MacMurray had coveted the China post, he soon fell into disagreement with the State Department over U.S. policy towards the ruling the Nationalist government. He resigned the position in 1929 and briefly left the foreign service. Following several years in academia, MacMurray returned to the State Department to become Minister to Estonia, Latvia and Lithuania from 1933 to 1936. He later served as ambassador to Turkey from 1936 to 1941, and then was made a special assistant to the Secretary of State until his retirement in 1944.

In 1935, MacMurray was commissioned to write a memorandum on the conflict between China and Japan. In it, he suggested that the United States, China, and Great Britain were partly to blame for Japan's invasion of China, and argued that unless the United States stopped opposing Japanese domination of China, a war between the two powers was likely. Japan later attacked the United States at Pearl Harbor in December 1941, drawing the US into World War II.

== Early life ==
MacMurray was born in Schenectady, New York to Junius Wilson MacMurray and Henrietta MacMurray (née Van Antwerp). His father was a career soldier, serving as a captain in the Union Army during the American Civil War, and later joining the regular army. MacMurray's father also taught military tactics at the University of Missouri and Cornell University, and was the author of several books. His mother, Henrietta Wiswall Van Antwerp, was the daughter of a bank president.

In 1892, at the age of eleven, MacMurray attended his father's boarding school near Princeton, New Jersey. Later, while he was attending the nearby Lawrenceville School, his father's death dealt a "deep emotional blow", according to historian Arthur Waldron. After graduating in 1898, MacMurray enrolled at Princeton University. The school's president, Woodrow Wilson, encouraged him to pursue a career in academia, noting his aptitude for language and literature. MacMurray was also said to display an independent nature, declining to participate in eating clubs or attend chapel.

In 1903, MacMurray was admitted to the Columbia University Law School, and gained admission to the New York State Bar Association in 1906. He concurrently pursued a master of arts degree in Elizabethan drama at Princeton University, which he received in 1907.

== Career ==
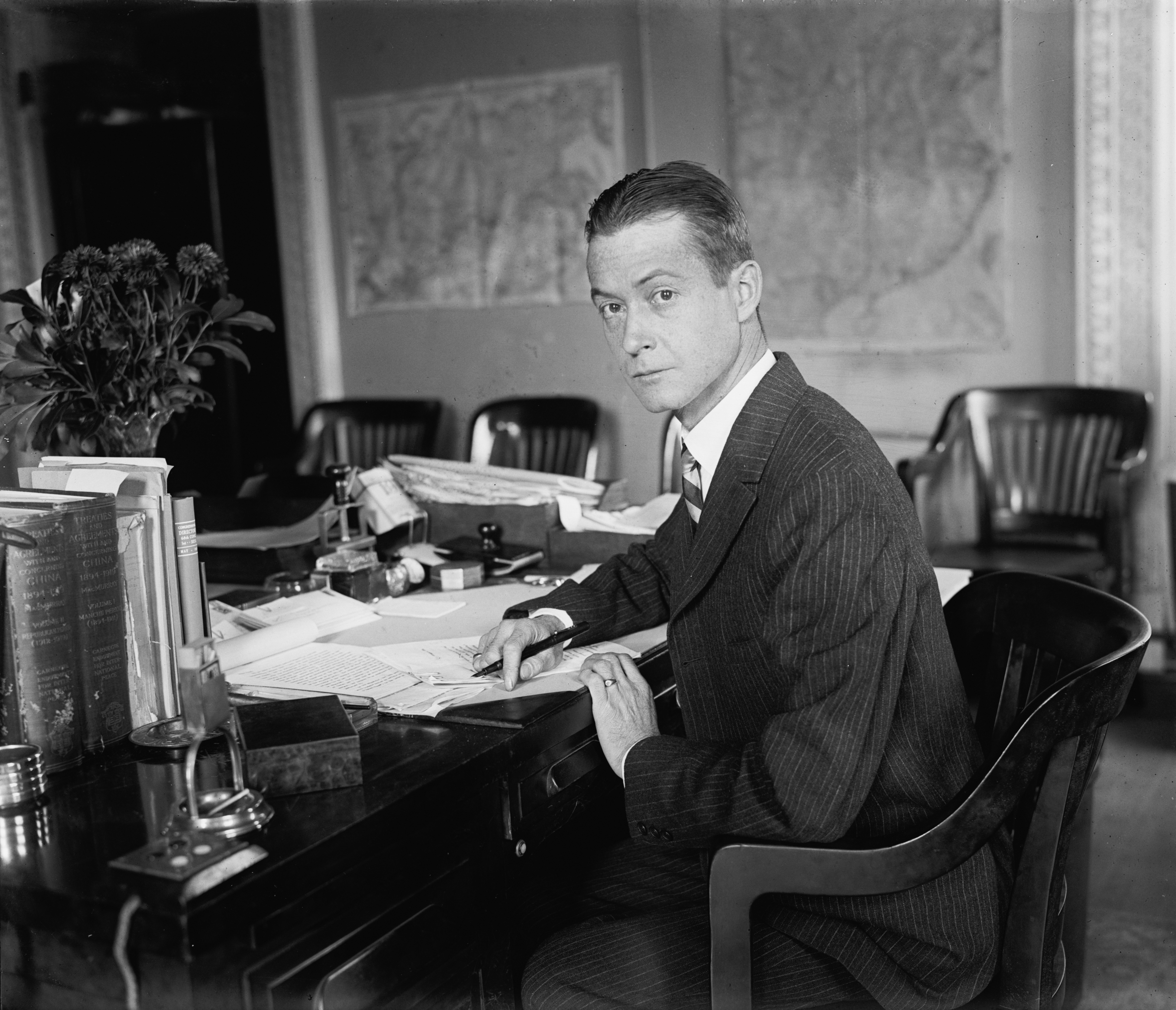
John Van Antwerp MacMurray as Assistant Secretary of State

Following his admission to the New York Bar, MacMurray sought a career in government. A letter of commendation from Woodrow Wilson helped MacMurray secure an opportunity to take the foreign service examination. In 1907, he was appointed as Consul-General and Secretary of Legation in Bangkok, Siam, and then became second secretary at the U.S. embassy in St. Petersburg. There he worked under ambassador William Woodville Rockhill, who was credited with helping to shape the United States' open door policy towards China.

Upon returning to Washington in 1911, MacMurray was made chief of the Division of Near Eastern Affairs, a position he held until 1913. He then had several appointments in East Asia: from 1913 to 1917, he was secretary of Legation in Peking, China, and from 1917 to 1919, he was counselor of the embassy in Tokyo. He had been offered a post as Minister to Siam in 1913, but declined in order to pursue the position in Peking. He again returned to the State Department in 1919 to serve as Chief of Division for Far Eastern Affairs from 1919 to 1924. During that time, MacMurray was involved as an observer to negotiations between China and Japan concerning the status of the Shandong Peninsula, and authored a book titled Treaties and Agreements with and Concerning China. The book was a compilation of all treaties and agreements with China from 1894 to 1919, and was published by the Carnegie Endowment for International Peace.

MacMurray briefly served as Assistant Secretary of State from 1924 to 1925. In 1925, he was appointed Minister to China under President Calvin Coolidge, who described him as "our top China expert". He assumed the post in July 1925. MacMurray was well regarded within the diplomatic community in Peking; Sir Ronald Macleay with the British delegation described him as friendly and agreeable, and relatively unburdened by the preconceived ideas and sentimentality towards China that afflicted several of his predecessors. Macleay noted that MacMurray could express himself well and forcefully in diplomatic meetings, but that he was "rather academic", and may have lacked confidence in himself. "I imagine that he allows himself very little freedom of action and refers to Washington on every possible occasion," wrote Macleay. Another British diplomat, Sir Miles W. Lampson, recorded MacMurray's complaints that Washington allowed him little initiative, and seldom adopted his proposals.

Soon after arriving in China, MacMurray fell into disagreement with Washington over U.S. policy towards the ruling Kuomintang (Nationalist) government, which had been demanding immediate revisions to or a cessation of the treaty system in place between the two countries. Whereas Washington wished to make concessions to the Nationalist government, MacMurray favored the enforcement of existing treaties. These differences of opinion led him to resign in November 1929, whereupon he became a professor of International Relations at Johns Hopkins University. In 1930, he became the first director of that university's Walter Hines Page School of International Relations.

In 1933, MacMurray returned to the foreign service. On September 9 of that year, he was appointed Envoy Extraordinary and Minister Plenipotentiary to Estonia, Latvia and Lithuania—a position he held until 1936. From 1936 to 1941, MacMurray served as Ambassador Extraordinary and Plenipotentiary in Turkey. He returned to Washington in 1942 and worked as a special assistant to the Secretary of State until his retirement in 1944.

=== 1935 Memorandum ===
In 1935, as tensions in East Asia were mounting, the Assistant Secretary of State for East Asian Affairs, Stanley Hornbeck, commissioned MacMurray to write a memorandum on the situation. The memorandum, "Developments Affecting American Policy in the Far East", challenged many of the underlying assumptions of U.S. policy towards Japan. The conventional wisdom held that Japan was the unprovoked aggressor in the brewing conflict with China. However, MacMurray posited that Chinese and American policies were partly to blame for Japan's actions; whereas Japan had closely adhered to the treaties and agreements brokered during the Washington Disarmament Conference, the United States, Great Britain and China frequently undermined them. Up until the Japanese invasion of Manchuria in 1931, the "Japanese Government ... was endeavoring in unimpeachable good faith to live up to its undertakings", wrote MacMurray. "The issue of success or failure for the policies evolved at the Washington Conference was actually in the hands of China herself, of Great Britain, and of the United States."

According to Arthur Waldron, MacMurray found that China in particular "systematically flouted the legal framework that alone guaranteed her international position, and by so doing invited Japan's wrath." MacMurray believed that the United States should have valued Japan's efforts to comply with the treaty agreements, and suggested that the United States should accept Japanese aggression against China, rather than aligning ever more closely with China. Barring that, he wrote, an American war with Japan was likely:

To oppose the Japanese domination of China and actively take all available means and occasions to frustrate it ... would, if pursued consistently and determinedly, almost inevitably mean war with Japan ... Such a war would be a major misfortune for us, even assuming our victory ... It would be a hideously long and costly process ... Even the elimination of Japan, if it were possible, would be no blessing to the Far East or to the world. It would merely create a new set of stresses, and substitute for Japan the USSR as the successor of Imperial Russia as a contestant (and at least an equally unscrupulous and dangerous one) for mastery of the East. Nobody except perhaps Russia would gain from our victory in such a war.

MacMurray's classified memorandum was immediately shelved by the State Department. Following the Second World War, it was available only in select archives. In 1992, the memorandum was published for first time with an introduction by University of Pennsylvania historian Arthur Waldron.

== Films and photography ==
A still from one of MacMurray's films of China

Throughout his diplomatic tours in China, MacMurray captured thousands of photographs and recorded hours of footage of everyday life. A collection consisting of more than 1,600 of MacMurray's photographs taken in rural China between 1913 and 1917 is held by the Princeton University library.

In 1925, just two years after the advent of the Cine-Kodak motion picture camera, MacMurray began making amateur films of life and travels in China, such as his trips to the Great Wall of China and a journey down the Yangtze River. One film depicted the procession of Sun Yat-sen's body from its original burial place in Peking to a new mausoleum in Nanking. Another film recorded in April 1928 captured scenes of daily life in Kalgan, north of Peking. MacMurray, along with his wife and sister, had traveled to Kalgan and Changpeh with Roy Chapman Andrews, an American explorer and naturalist who made multiple expeditions to the Gobi Desert. During the civil war in 1928, however, rogue brigands and soldiers had made travel difficult in the region. To secure passage between Kalgan and Changpeh, MacMurray enlisted the aid of local warlord Zhang Zuolin, who provided an escort of 50 cavalry, 8 cars, and 150 camels.

== Family ==
In 1916, MacMurray married Lois R. Goodnow, the daughter of Frank Johnson Goodnow—a legal scholar, president of Johns Hopkins University, and a former advisor to the government of the Republic of China. Goodnow had been one of MacMurray's professors at Columbia University. The couple had three children: Joan Goodnow MacMurray, Frank Goodnow MacMurray, and Lois Van Antwerp MacMurray.

== Later life ==
MacMurray died in September 1960, in Norfolk, Connecticut.

== Works ==
- Treaties and Agreements with and Concerning China, 1894-1919: Manchu period (1894-1911)

Diplomatic posts
Preceded by Robert Peet Skinner	United States Ambassador to Turkey; 1936–1941	Succeeded by Laurence Steinhardt
