= William M. Cockrum House =

Historic house in Indiana, United States

- U.S. National Register of Historic Places
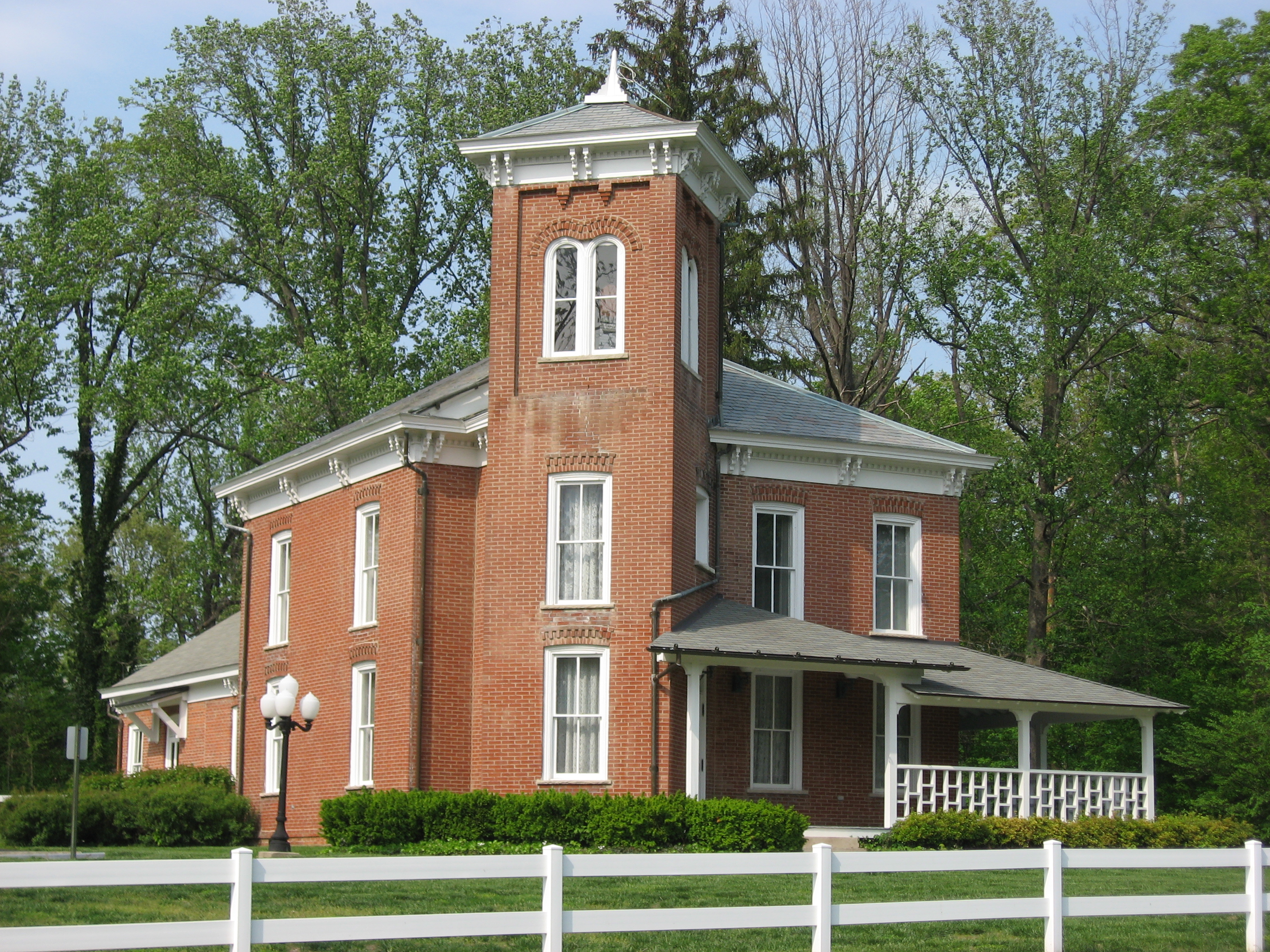
- William M. Cockrum House, April 2011

- Location within Indiana Location within the United States
- Location: 627 W. Oak St., Oakland City, Indiana
- Coordinates: 38°20′15″N 87°21′13″W
- Area: 2.7 acres (1.1 ha)
- Built: 1876
- Architectural style: Italian Villa
- NRHP reference No.: 78000031
- Added to NRHP: September 13, 1978

William M. Cockrum House, also known as Cockrum Hall, is a historic home located at Oakland City, Indiana. It was built in 1876, and is a two-story, Italian Villa style brick dwelling with a one-story wing. It features a three-story square corner tower set at a 45-degree angle, round and segmental arched windows, and bracketed cornice. It was listed on the National Register of Historic Places in 1978.

The building was built to replace the original home of the Cockrums which was a wood-frame structure that was burned down in 1875 by saloon supporters in retaliation against the Cockrums for their influence and support of the dry movement. The original home was an active stop on the Underground Railroad. and was located roughly the same location as the current building.

Colonel William M. Cockrum (1837–1924) built the home with his wife Lucretia (Harper) and himself. The family had a relationship with Oakland City University, with William and Lucretia both supporting the establishment of the Baptist college. The family donated several acres to the college on which the first college building was built. Furthermore, after the death of one of William and Lucretia's children, Zoe Cockrum Aldrich, the property was bequeathed to the college in the late 1950s.

The home has served Oakland City University as the Music and Fine Arts Building, and most recently, after extensive renovations, as the Development and Alumni Offices. Cockrum Hall is the oldest building on the college campus.

== William M. Cockrum ==
William M. Cockrum was born in Gibson County, Indiana in 1837, was a farmer by trade (leaf tobacco and pork), and a prominent member of the Oakland community. His father, James W. Cockrum, was also a prominent member of the community, originally platted the town, was Baptist, and was staunchly against slavery. Subsequently, William grew up in an environment surrounded by Underground Railroad and anti-slavery activities. Additional causes that the Cockrums supported included the temperance movement (the family is considered responsible for keeping Oakland City dry until 1881) and education for all (the family heavily supported Oakland College financially and with land donations).

Cockrum was married twice. Before her death, his first wife Sarah Barrett and he had seven children. His second wife was Lucretia (1839–1919). They married in 1856 and had nine children.

During the American Civil War, Cockrum volunteered for service and achieved the rank of Lieutenant-Colonel of Company F of the 42nd Indiana Infantry Regiment. He was wounded both at the First Battle of Murfreesboro and the Battle of Chickamauga, the latter of which he was both severely wounded and was captured and held at Libby Prison in Richmond for eight months. He was released as part of a prisoner exchange, and after a lengthy recovery, he was assigned to command a military prison in Nashville until being ordered to rejoin his command within Company F and mustered out of service.

The chaired the committee to help establish Chickamauga Battlefield as a national park. There is a monument to Cockrum at the battlefield located approximately where he had been wounded in battle. In Gibson County, Cockrum also served on the committee to raise funds to purchase and install a monument dedicated to the survivors and those who lost their lives from Company F, 42nd Regiment. The monument was located in Oakland City and was dedicated in 1893 for the surviving members and those who lost their lives from Company F.

The Cockrum home was burned down by saloon supporters in 1875 and is an example of the complex dynamic of temperance and anti-saloon sentiment in southern Indiana. The fire was set in retaliation to William Cockrum's "...savage extralegal attack against an Oakland saloon."

Cockrum died in 1924 and is buried in Montgomery Cemetery in Gibson County.

=== Published works by Cockrum ===
Cockrum spent fifty years gathering and documenting Indiana's early history. He was influenced and encouraged to write by his former comrade General Lew Wallace. In 1907, Cockrum published the Pioneer History of Indiana: Including Stories, Incidents, and Customs of the Early Settlers In 1915, he published History of the Underground Railroad as it was Conducted by the Anti-Slavery League. His published works gave insights on the viewpoints and attitudes of the "plain Indiana farmers" of southern Indiana at the height of the Underground Railroad operations.

He is included in The Hoosier Year of 366 Indiana Writers and Speakers (1916) with the following quote, "Forgetful and thankless indeed would we be did we not keep the sacred fires of memory burning upon the altar of our appreciation."
