= Dorothy Schurman Hawes =

American writer (1905–1977)

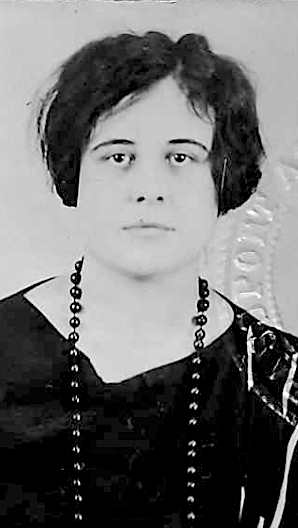
- Dorothy A. M. Schurman, from her 1924 passport application
- Born: Dorothy Anna Maria Schurman; December 19, 1905; Ithaca, New York
- Died: July 24, 1977 (aged 71); Purcellville, Virginia
- Other names: Dorothy Schurman McHugh, Dorothy Schurman Sisk
- Occupation: Writer
- Notable work: To the Farthest Gulf: The Story of the American China Trade (1941)
- Spouse(s): James M. McHugh, Robert Nicholas Dawes, James Strother Sisk
- Parent: Jacob Gould Schurman

Dorothy Schurman Hawes (December 19, 1905 – July 24, 1977) was an American writer. Her father, Jacob Gould Schurman, was the United States minister to China in the 1920s, and her first husband, James M. McHugh, was an American intelligence officer in China. She wrote To the Farthest Gulf: The Story of the American China Trade (1941).

== Early life ==
Dorothy Schurman was born in Ithaca, New York, the youngest daughter of Jacob Gould Schurman and Barbara Forrest Munro Schurman. Her parents were both born in Canada; her father was an American diplomat, and third president of Cornell University. She graduated from Rosemary Hall School in Connecticut and attended Bryn Mawr College. She left Bryn Mawr after two years, to help her mother with social duties at the American embassies in Beijing and Berlin.

== Career ==
Schurman lived with her parents in China, and moved with them to Berlin in 1925, when her father was American ambassador to Germany. She was living in China again in 1931. Hawes wrote a series of articles about the trade history between the United States and China for the Essex Institute, based on ships' logs and other primary sources archived in Massachusetts, and compiled the series into a book, To the Farthest Gulf: The Story of the American China Trade (1941).

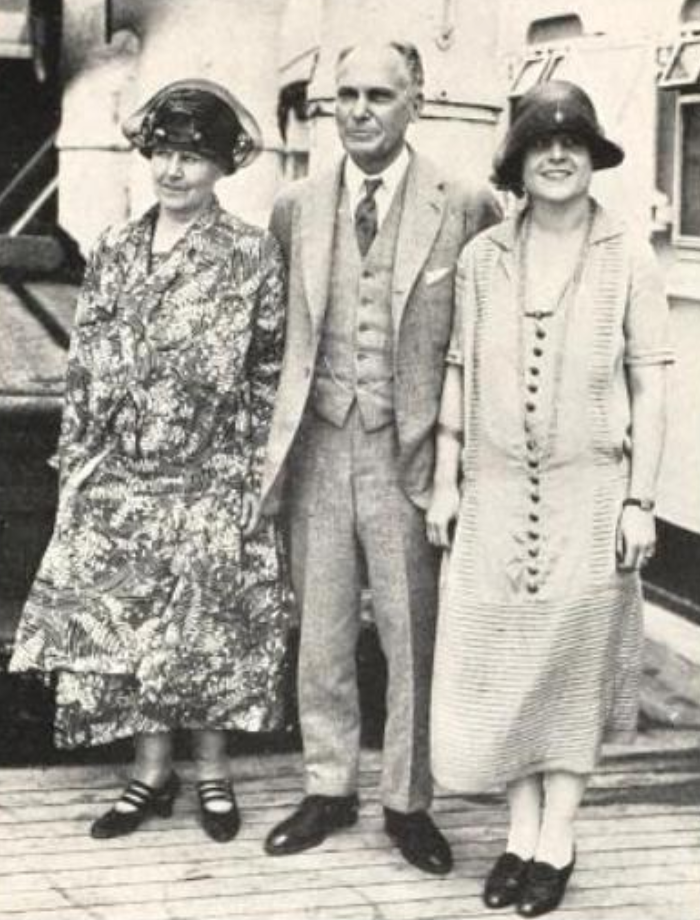
Dorothy Schurman, right, with her parents, on the deck of a ship in 1925

== Personal life and legacy ==
Dorothy Schurman married three times. She married U.S. Marine Corps officer James Marshall McHugh in 1926, in Germany. They had two sons, James Jr. and George, and divorced in 1940. She married attorney Robert Nicholas Hawes in 1940, as his second wife; they had a daughter, Nicole, and divorced in 1946. Soon after her second marriage began, she was fined for driving while intoxicated in Missouri. She married James Strother Sisk; they had a daughter, Suzanne, born in 1949. She was widowed when James Sisk died in 1970; she died in 1977, aged 71 years, in Purcellville, Virginia.

Dorothy Schurman Hawes' book, To the Farthest Gulf, was reissued in 1990, and is still cited by scholars, and found on suggested reading lists for the topic.
