= James R. Slack =

American politician

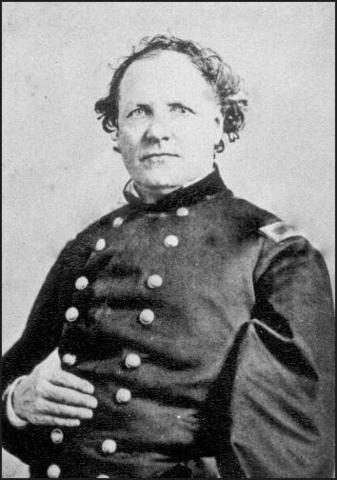
- Born: James Richard Slack; September 28, 1818; Bucks County, Pennsylvania, U.S.
- Died: July 28, 1881 (aged 62); Chicago, Illinois, U.S.
- Burial place: Mt. Hope Cemetery, Huntington, Indiana
- Military career
- Allegiance: United States of America; Union
- Branch: United States Army; Union Army
- Service years: 1861–1866
- Rank: Brigadier General; Brevet Major General
- Commands: 47th Indiana Volunteer Infantry
- Conflicts: American Civil War: Battle of Island Number Ten; Battle of Port Gibson; Battle of Champion Hill; Siege of Vicksburg; Battle of Mansfield; Battle of Fort Blakeley
- Other work: lawyer, Indiana legislator

James Richard Slack (September 28, 1818 – July 28, 1881) was an Indiana politician and a Union general during the American Civil War.

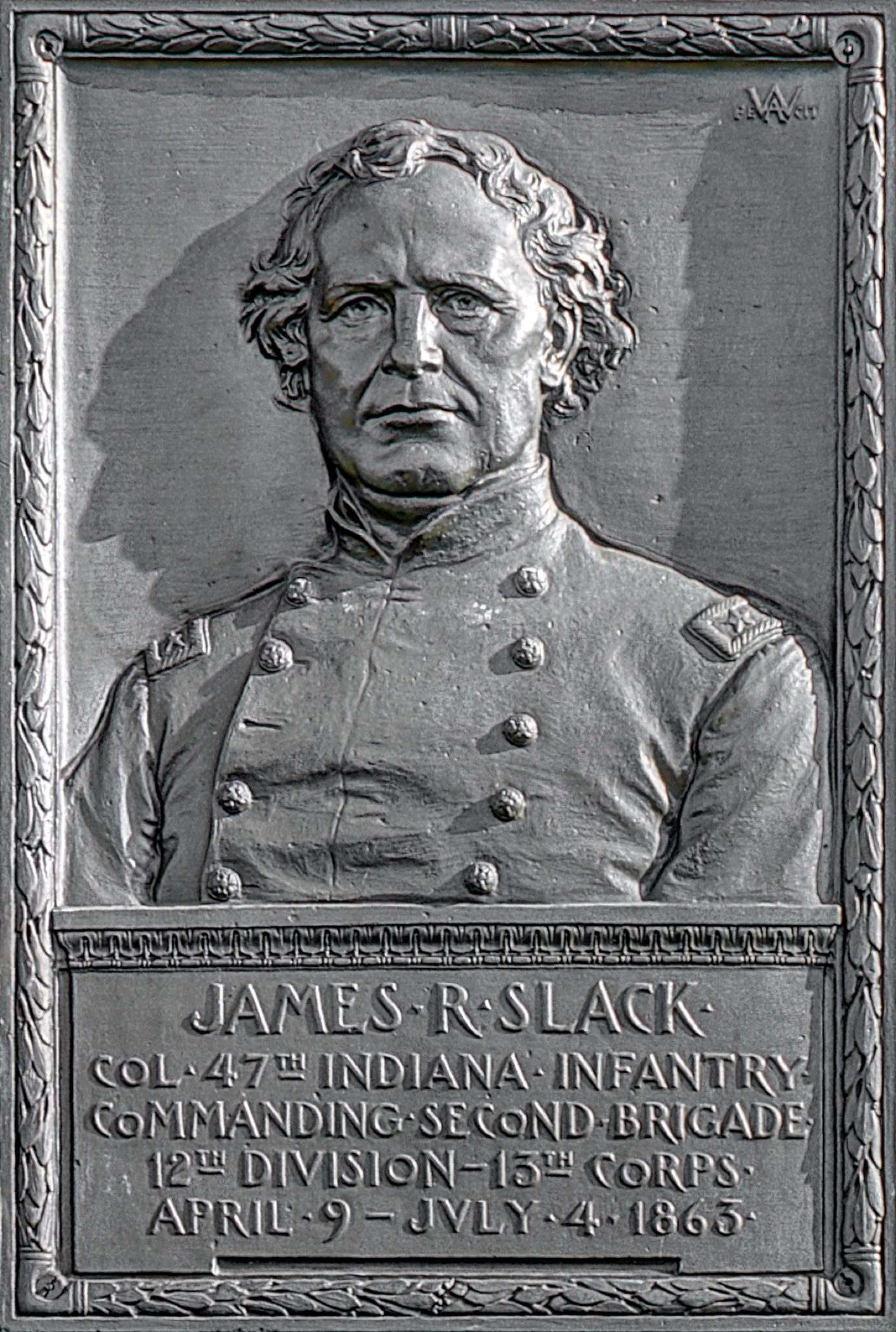
Bronze relief portrait of Slack at Vicksburg National Military Park

== Early life ==
Slack was born in Bucks County, Pennsylvania in 1818. His family moved to Indiana in 1837 where he worked as a farm hand on his father's farm. He also worked as a teacher, studied law and was admitted to the bar in 1840. He moved to Huntington, Indiana where he became involved in politics, first as county auditor then as a member of the Indiana State Senate.

== Civil War ==
On December 13, 1861, Slack was appointed colonel of the 47th Indiana Volunteer Infantry. Shortly after he assumed command of a brigade in the Army of the Mississippi. During the Battle of Island Number Ten he commanded the 1st Brigade in General John M. Palmer's 3rd Division of the Army of the Mississippi. After that, Slack led his regiment in several expeditions in the Mississippi Valley.

In 1863 he was again in brigade command during the Vicksburg Campaign where he led the 2nd Brigade, 12th Division, XIII Corps. During the siege of Vicksburg he was transferred to command the 2nd Brigade, 3rd Division, XIII Corps. He remained in command of this brigade during the Red River Campaign. During the fall of 1864 he commanded the 2nd Brigade, 2nd Division, XIX Corps. On November 10, 1864. was promoted to brigadier general of volunteers, to rank from November 10, 1864. President Abraham Lincoln submitted the nomination to the United States Senate on December 12, 1864, and the Senate confirmed the appointment on February 14, 1865.

By the end of the war General Slack was in command of the 1st Brigade, 1st Division XIII Corps which he led at the battle of Fort Blakeley. After the war, he was assigned command at Brazos Santiago, Texas, until sent home to Indiana to be with the 47th Indiana when they mustered out of the army. He was mustered out of the volunteers on January 15, 1866. On July 9, 1866, President Andrew Johnson nominated Slack for appointment to the grade of brevet major general of volunteers, to rank from March 13, 1865, and the United States Senate confirmed the appointment on July 23, 1866.

== Post war ==
After the war General Slack returned to Huntington to resume his law practice. He was appointed to the 28th Judicial Circuit and ran for U.S. Congress in 1881 but was defeated. Slack died while visiting Chicago in 1881. He was buried in Huntington.
