= Walter Hines Page School of International Relations =

Former research institute of Johns Hopkins University

The Walter Hines Page School of International Relations was a research institute that was part of Johns Hopkins University in Baltimore, Maryland, United States. It began official operations in 1930, although it had trouble acquiring sufficient funding, and was led at different times by John Van Antwerp MacMurray, Frederick S. Dunn, and Owen Lattimore. The school came to an end in 1953 as part of a university reorganization and possibly also due to Red Scare accusations against Lattimore.

== Origins ==
The school's planning started in 1924, with the school to be located at Johns Hopkins University in Baltimore. It was named after the late American diplomat Walter Hines Page, who had been one of the first fellows in philology in the university's history. The school was intended as a memorial to his life by his relatives, which had gained in stature following the publication of The Life and Letters of Walter Hines Page in 1922. An early advocate for the school was U.S. Navy Admiral William S. Sims, who had shared a worldview with Page. Among the early backers for the idea were industrialist Owen D. Young and politician George L. P. Radcliffe. Vice President of the United States Charles G. Dawes gave his share of the 1925 Nobel Peace Prize to the school, a gift that amounted to around $15,775.

Nonetheless, attaining funding for the school was a problem, and the amounts that were raised previously were depleted by the stock market crash of 1929. The school did not officially begin operation until 1930, at which point the fundraising had brought in only $300,000 of an intended goal of $1 million. Under the university presidency of Joseph Sweetman Ames, the Walter Hines Page School of International Relations was organized as a division of Johns Hopkins.

At the time, American universities were just beginning to view international relations as a subject for formal programs of study. The goal of the new institution was to do research regarding a broad range of topics and behaviors related to relations among states. The school was intended to look at the specific problems that American foreign policy faced, and there was also the idea that the research produced might give humanity some guidance towards finding world peace. The school had ambitious plans, among them the creation of a professorship international law, theory of diplomacy, international finance, and commercial policy. The Page School was one of several such institutes to be created during the interwar years, with two other well-known instances being the Fletcher School of Law and Diplomacy at Tufts University and the Institute of International Studies at Yale University.

== Activities and influence ==
The Page School's initial director was the American diplomat John Van Antwerp MacMurray, who officially stayed in the position until 1936. The international law scholar Frederick Sherwood Dunn was the school's executive secretary from 1929 to 1935, and Dunn was effectively head of the school during the mid-1930s when MacMurray was recalled to diplomatic duty in the Baltics.

Some of the initial emphasis of the school was on European relations. Perhaps the best-known early work coming out of the Page School was Albert K. Weinberg's 1935 book Manifest Destiny: A Study of Nationalist Expansionism in American History. But the school was already running a deficit by 1932, and failing to acquire new sources of funds and lacking sufficient resources, Dunn departed.

The Orientalist Owen Lattimore was director of the school from 1939 to 1953, except for the years 1941 through 1944, which he spent in China. The staff of the school mostly consisted of senior professors and postdoctoral students. Under Lattimore, the school's direction changed to a focus upon Oriental studies and especially Sinology. There was a major effort around 1950 that emphasized Mongolian studies. One account described the school at this time as "an Asian research bureau", which was not what the leaders of Johns Hopkins nor Page's heirs had envisioned.

== End ==
In 1950, Johns Hopkins acquired the previously independent School of Advanced International Studies (SAIS), based in Washington, D.C. At the time, Johns Hopkins president Detlev Bronk said that there was little overlap between the two schools. As it happened, SAIS was closer to the original intent of the Page School than the Page School under Lattimore was by that time.

Meanwhile, McCarthyism had taken hold, and in 1950 attacks were made upon Lattimore as a supposed agent of the Soviet Union which that eventually resulted in Lattimore being indicted on federal charges of perjury in 1952 and having to take a leave of absence from the university.

Action was taken to "discontinue" the Page School in 1953, as part of what Bronk termed "a series of steps being taken at the university to simplify its academic structure." Among scholars, views have differed upon the full rationale for the closing of the school. One has stated that the decision had already been made to close the school and that it had nothing to do with the controversies surrounding Lattimore, with some further academics repeating that contention without necessarily endorsing it. Another has said that "it seemed to be an expression of criticism of Lattimore" on the part of administration and trustees of Johns Hopkins. Yet another has suggested that the closure was possibly "intended so to anger Lattimore that he would quit without needing to be fired". Regardless of the reasons, the closing of the school did not elicit much in the way of protests. (The perjury charges against Lattimore were subsequently dismissed by the courts or dropped by the government. While the university never dismissed Lattimore, it effectively lowered his status there, and several years later he departed for a position in England.)

In any case, it has been the general impression that at Johns Hopkins, the Page School was effectively supplanted by SAIS, which subsequently became known as the Paul H. Nitze School of Advanced International Studies.
