= 80th Indiana Infantry Regiment =

80th Regiment Indiana Infantry
- Active: September 8, 1862 – June 22, 1865
- Country: United States
- Allegiance: Union
- Branch: Infantry
- Engagements: Defense of Cincinnati; Battle of Perryville; Atlanta campaign Battle of Resaca; Battle of Kennesaw Mountain; Siege of Atlanta; Battle of Jonesboro; Second Battle of Franklin; Battle of Nashville; Carolinas campaign

The 80th Regiment Indiana Infantry was an infantry regiment that served in the Union Army during the American Civil War.

== Service ==
The 80th Indiana Infantry was organized at Princeton and Indianapolis, Indiana and mustered in for a three-year enlistment on September 8, 1862, under the command of Lieutenant Colonel Lewis Brooks.

The regiment was attached to 34th Brigade, 10th Division, Army of the Ohio, September 1862. 34th Brigade, 10th Division, I Corps, Army of the Ohio, to November 1862. District of Western Kentucky, Department of the Ohio, to June 1863. 2nd Brigade, 3rd Division, XXIII Corps, Department of the Ohio, to August 1863. 1st Brigade, 2nd Division, XXIII Corps, Army of the Ohio, to June 1864. 2nd Brigade, 2nd Division, XXIII Corps, Army of the Ohio, to February 1865, and Department of North Carolina to June 1865.

The 80th Indiana Infantry mustered out of service on June 22, 1865. Recruits were transferred to the 122nd Indiana Infantry.

== Detailed service ==
Left Indiana for Covington, Kentucky, September 9, then moved to Louisville, Kentucky. Pursuit of Bragg into Kentucky October 1–15. 1862. Battle of Perryville, October 8. Moved to Lebanon, Kentucky, and duty there until December. Pursuit of Morgan to the Cumberland River December 22, 1862, to January 2, 1863. Duty at Elizabethtown, Kentucky, until March, and at Woodsonville until August. Pursuit of Morgan June 20-July 5. Burnside's Campaign in eastern Tennessee August 16-October 17. March over Cumberland Mountains to Knoxville August 16-September 3. Duty at Kingston until December 5. Action at Kingston November 24. Moved to Nashville, Tennessee, December 6, thence march to Blain's Cross Roads and Mossy Creek. Mossy Creek, Talbot Station, December 29. Operations in eastern Tennessee until April 1864. Atlanta Campaign May 1 to September 8. Demonstrations on Rocky Faced Ridge and Dalton, Georgia, May 9–13. Battle of Resaca, May 14–15. Advance on Dallas May 18–25. Operations on line of Pumpkin Vine Creek and battles about Dallas, New Hope Church, and Allatoona Hills May 25-June 5. Operations about Marietta and against Kennesaw Mountain June 10-July 2. Pine Hill June 11–14, Lost Mountain June 15–17. Muddy Creek June 17. Noyes Creek June 19. Kolb's Farm June 22. Assault on Kennesaw June 27. Chattahoochie River July 3–17. Decatur July 19. Howard House July 20. Siege of Atlanta July 22-August 25. Flank movement on Jonesboro August 25–30. Battle of Jonesboro August 31-September 1. Lovejoy's Station September 2–6. Pursuit of Hood into Alabama October 3–26. Nashville Campaign November–December. Columbia, Duck River, November 24–27. Battle of Franklin, November 30. Battle of Nashville, December 15–16. Pursuit of Hood to the Tennessee River December 17–28. At Clifton, Tennessee, until January 16, 1865. Movement to Washington, D.C., then to Fort Fisher, North Carolina, January 16-February 9. Operations against Hoke February 11–14. Fort Anderson February 18–19. Town Creek February 19–20. Capture of Wilmington February 22. Campaign of the Carolinas March 1-April 26. Advance on Goldsboro March 6–21. Occupation of Goldsboro March 21. Advance on Raleigh April 10–14. Occupation of Raleigh April 14. Bennett's House April 26. Surrender of Johnston and his army. Duty at Salisbury until June.

== Casualties ==
The regiment lost a total of 242 men during service; 6 officers and 64 enlisted men killed or mortally wounded, 1 officer and 171 enlisted men died of disease.

== Commanders ==
- Colonel Charles Harvey Denby - resigned January 1863
- Colonel Lewis Brooks - commanded January–August 1863
- Colonel James L. Culbertson - commanded August 1863-January 1864
- Lieutenant Colonel Alfred D. Owen - commanded January–May 1864; August 1864-June 1865
- Lieutenant Colonel John W. Tucker - commanded May–August 1864

== See also ==
- List of Indiana Civil War regiments
- Indiana in the Civil War
