= 47th Indiana Infantry Regiment =

47th Regiment Indiana Infantry
- Active: November 2, 1861 – November 2, 1865
- Country: United States
- Allegiance: Union
- Branch: Infantry
- Engagements: Battle of Island Number Ten; Battle of Port Gibson; Battle of Champion Hill; Siege of Vicksburg, May 19 & May 22 assaults Bayou Teche Campaign; Red River Campaign; Battle of Sabine Crossroads; Battle of Fort Blakeley

The 47th Regiment Indiana Infantry was an infantry regiment that served in the Union Army during the American Civil War.

== Service ==
The 47th Indiana Infantry was organized at Anderson and Logansport, Indiana November 2 through December 13, 1861, and mustered in for a three-year enlistment under the command of Colonel James Richard Slack.

The regiment was attached to 19th Brigade, Army of the Ohio, to January 1862. 19th Brigade, 4th Division, Army of the Ohio, to February 1862. 1st Brigade, 2nd Division, Army of the Mississippi, to April 1862. 2nd Brigade, 3rd Division, Army of the Mississippi, to July 1863. Helena, Arkansas, District of Eastern Arkansas, Department of the Missouri, to December 1862. 1st Brigade, 2nd Division, District of Eastern Arkansas, Department of the Tennessee, to January 1863. 1st Brigade, 12th Division, XIII Corps, Army of the Tennessee, to February 1863. 1st Brigade, 13th Division, XIII Corps, to March 1863. 2nd Brigade, 12th Division, XIII Corps, to July 1863. 2nd Brigade, 3rd Division, XIII Corps, Department of the Tennessee, to August 1863, and Department of the Gulf to June 1864. District of LaFourche, Department of the Gulf, to July 1864. 2nd Brigade, 2nd Division, XIX Corps, Department of the Gulf, to December 1864. 1st Brigade, Reserve Division, Military Division, West Mississippi, to February 1865. 1st Brigade, 1st Division, Reserve Corps, Military Division, West Mississippi, February 1865. 1st Brigade, 1st Division, XIII Corps, Military Division, West Mississippi, to May 1865. Department of Louisiana to October 1865.

The 47th Indiana Infantry mustered out of service October 23, 1865, and discharged November 2, 1865, at Indianapolis.

== Detailed service ==
- Left Indiana for Bardstown, Kentucky, December 13, 1861
- Moved to Camp Wickliffe, Kentucky, and duty there until February 1862.
- Ordered to Commerce, Missouri, February 14, 1862.
- New Madrid, Missouri, February 24.
- Siege of New Madrid, Missouri, March 5–14.
- Siege and capture of Island No. 10, Mississippi River, March 15-April 8.
- Expedition to Fort Pillow, Tennessee, April 13–17.
- Duty at Tiptonville until May 19.
- Expedition down Mississippi River to Fort Pillow May 19–23.
- Moved to Memphis, Tennessee, June, and duty there until July 24.
- Moved to Helena, Arkansas, July 24 and duty there until February 1863.
- Brown's Plantation, Mississippi, August 11, 1862.
- Expedition to Arkansas Post November 16–21.
- Expedition to Yazoo Pass by Moon Lake, Yazoo Pass, and Coldwater and Tallahatchie Rivers February 24-April 8.
- Fort Pemberton March 11.
- Operations against Fort Pemberton and Greenwood March 13-April 5.
- Moved to Milliken's Bend, Louisiana, April 12.
- Movement on Bruinsburg and turning Grand Gulf April 25–30.
- Battle of Port Gibson, Mississippi, May 1. 14-Mile Creek May 12–13.
- Battle of Champion Hill May 16.
- Siege of Vicksburg, Mississippi, May 18-July 4.
- Assault on Vicksburg May 19 and 22.
- Advance on Jackson, Mississippi, July 4–10.
- Siege of Jackson July 10–17.
- Ordered to New Orleans, Louisiana, August 10.
- At Carrollton, Brashear City, and Berwick until October.
- Western Louisiana "Teche" Campaign October 3-November 30.
- Duty at New Iberia until December 17.
- Moved to New Orleans, Louisiana, December 17
- Madisonville January 7, 1864, and duty there until March.
- Red River Campaign March 10-May 22.
- Advance from Franklin to Alexandria March 14–26.
- Battle of Sabine Cross Roads April 8.
- Monett's Ferry, Cane River Crossings, April 23.
- Alexandria April 30-May 10.
- Muddy Bayou May 2–6.
  - Graham's Plantation May 5.
- Retreat to Morganza May 13–20.
  - Mansura May 16.
- Expedition to the Atchafalaya May 30-June 6.
- Duty at Morganza until September.
- Expedition to Clinton August 23–29.
- At St. Charles, Arkansas, September 3-October 23.
- Expedition to Duvall's Bluff October 23-November 12.
- Moved to Little Rock, Arkansas, then to Memphis, Tennessee, November 25, and duty there until January 1865.
  - Expedition to Moscow December 21–31, 1864.
- Ordered to New Orleans, Louisiana, January 1, 1865.
- Campaign against Mobile and its defenses March 17-April 12.
  - Near Spanish Fort March 26.
  - Siege of Spanish Fort and Fort Blakely March 26-April 8.
  - Assault on and capture of Fort Blakely April 9.
- Occupation of Mobile April 12 to May 26.
- Moved to New Orleans, Louisiana, May 26
- Shreveport, Louisiana, and duty there until October.

== Casualties ==
The regiment lost a total of 336 men during service; 2 officers and 80 enlisted men killed or mortally wounded, 4 officers and 250 enlisted men died of disease.

== Commanders ==
- Colonel James Richard Slack
- Lieutenant Colonel Milton Stapp Robinson
- Lieutenant Colonel John A. McLaughlin - commanded at the battle of Champion Hill and during the siege of Vicksburg

== See also ==
- List of Indiana Civil War regiments
- Indiana in the Civil War
