= 42nd Indiana Infantry Regiment =

42nd Regiment Indiana Infantry
- Active: October 9, 1861 – July 21, 1865
- Country: United States
- Allegiance: Union
- Branch: Infantry
- Engagements: Battle of Perryville; Battle of Stones River; Tullahoma Campaign; Battle of Chickamauga; Siege of Chattanooga; Battle of Lookout Mountain; Battle of Missionary Ridge; Atlanta campaign Battle of Resaca; Battle of Kennesaw Mountain; Battle of Peachtree Creek; Siege of Atlanta; Battle of Jonesboro; Sherman's March to the Sea; Carolinas campaign Battle of Bentonville

The 42nd Regiment Indiana Infantry was an infantry regiment that served in the Union Army during the American Civil War.

== Service ==
The 42nd Indiana Infantry was organized at Evansville, Indiana and mustered in for a three-year enlistment on October 9, 1861, under the command of Colonel James Garrard Jones. The regiment was recruited in Daviess, Gibson, Pike, Spencer, Warrick, and Vanderburgh counties.

The regiment was attached to 14th Brigade, Army of the Ohio, October to December 1861. 14th Brigade, 5th Division, Army of the Ohio, to April 1862. 17th Brigade, 3rd Division, Army of the Ohio, to September 1862. 17th Brigade, 3rd Division, I Corps, Army of the Ohio, to November 1862. 2nd Brigade, 1st Division, Center, XIV Corps, Army of the Cumberland, to January 1863. 2nd Brigade, 1st Division, XIV Corps, Army of the Cumberland, to April 1863. 1st Brigade, 2nd Division, XIV Corps to October 1863. 1st Brigade, 1st Division, XIV Corps, to July 1865.

The 42nd Indiana Infantry mustered out of service at Louisville, Kentucky on July 21, 1865.

== Detailed service ==
=== 1862 ===
January - February - Ordered to Kentucky, and duty at Henderson, Calhoun and Owensboro, Kentucky

February 10–25 - Advance on Nashville, Tennessee

March 28-April 11 - Occupation of Shelbyville and Fayetteville and advance on Huntsville, Alabama

April 11–14 - Alabama

April 11 -Action at Wartrace

April 29 - Advance on and capture of Decatur, Alabama

August 27-September 26 - Action at West Bridge near Bridgeport

until August - Duty at Huntsville, Alabama.March to Nashville, Tennessee, then to Louisville, Kentucky, in pursuit of Bragg,

October 1–15 - Pursuit of Bragg into Kentucky

October 8 - Battle of Perryville

October 16-November 7 - March to Nashville, Tennessee

until December 26 - Duty in Nashville, Tennessee

December 26–30 - Advance on Murfreesboro

December 30–31 - Battle of Stones River

=== 1863 ===
January 1–3 - Battle of Stones River

March 9–14 - Duty at Murfreesboro until June. Reconnaissance to Versailles

June 23-July 7 - Tullahoma Campaign

until August 16 - Elm River

June 29 - Occupation of middle Tennessee

August 16-September 22 - Passage of the Cumberland Mountains and Tennessee River and Chickamauga Campaign

September 11 - Davis Cross Roads or Dug Gap

September 19–21 - Battle of Chickamauga

September 21 - Rossville Gap

September 24-November 23 - Siege of Chattanooga

November 23–27 - Chattanooga-Ringgold Campaign

November 23–24 - Lookout Mountain

November 25 - Missionary Ridge

November 26 - Pea Vine Creek and Graysville

November 27 - Ringgold Gap, Taylor's Ridge

=== 1864 ===
January 1, 1864 - Regiment reenlisted

May 1-September 8 - Atlanta Campaign

May 8–11 - Demonstrations on Rocky Faced Ridge

May 8–9 - Buzzard's Roost Gap

May 14–15 - Battle of Resaca

May 18–25 - Advance on Dallas

May 25-June 5 - Operations on Pumpkin Vine Creek and battles about Dallas, New Hope Church, and Allatoona Hills

May 27 - Pickett's Mill

June 10-July 2 - Operations about Marietta and against Kennesaw Mountain

June 11–14 - Pine Hill

June 15–17 - Lost Mountain

June 27 - Assault on Kennesaw

July 4 - Ruff's Station, Smyrna Camp Ground

July 5–17 - Chattahoochee River

July 18 - Buckhead, Nancy's Creek

July 19–20 - Peachtree Creek

July 22-August 25 - Siege of Atlanta

August 5–7 - Utoy Creek

August 25–30 - Flank movement on Jonesboro

August 29 - Near Red Oak

August 31-September 1 - Battle of Jonesboro

September 29-November 3 - Operations against Hood in northern Georgia and northern Alabama

November 15-December 10 - March to the Sea

December 10–21 - Siege of Savannah

=== 1865 ===
January to April - Campaign of the Carolinas

March 16 - Averysboro, North Carolina

March 19–21 - Battle of Bentonville

March 24 - Occupation of Goldsboro

April 10–14 - Advance on Raleigh

April 14 - Occupation of Raleigh

April 26 - Bennett's House

April 29-May 19 - Surrender of Johnston and his army. March to Washington, D.C., via Richmond, Virginia

May 24 - Grand Review of the Armies

June - Moved to Louisville, Kentucky

== Casualties ==
The regiment lost a total of 310 men during service; 5 officers and 108 enlisted men killed or mortally wounded, 1 officer and 196 enlisted men died of disease.

== Commanders ==
- Colonel James Garrard Jones - mustered out November 4, 1864 on expiration of term of service
- Colonel William T. B. McIntire - commanded at the Battle of Chickamauga as lieutenant colonel; resigned as lieutenant colonel, December 12, 1864
- Colonel Gideon R. Kellams - mustered out with regiment.
- Lieutenant Colonel Charles Harvey Denby - second-in-command from inception through the Battle of Perryville; then assumed command of 80th Indiana Infantry Regiment
- Lieutenant Colonel James M. Shanklin - commanded at the Battle of Stones River but was captured during the battle
- Lieutenant Colonel William M. Cockrum of Company F - wounded at the First Battle of Murfreesboro and Battle of Chickamauga, captured and held at Libby Prison until released.

== See also ==
- List of Indiana Civil War regiments
- Indiana in the Civil War
