= Elwell Stephen Otis =

United States Army general

Elwell S. Otis
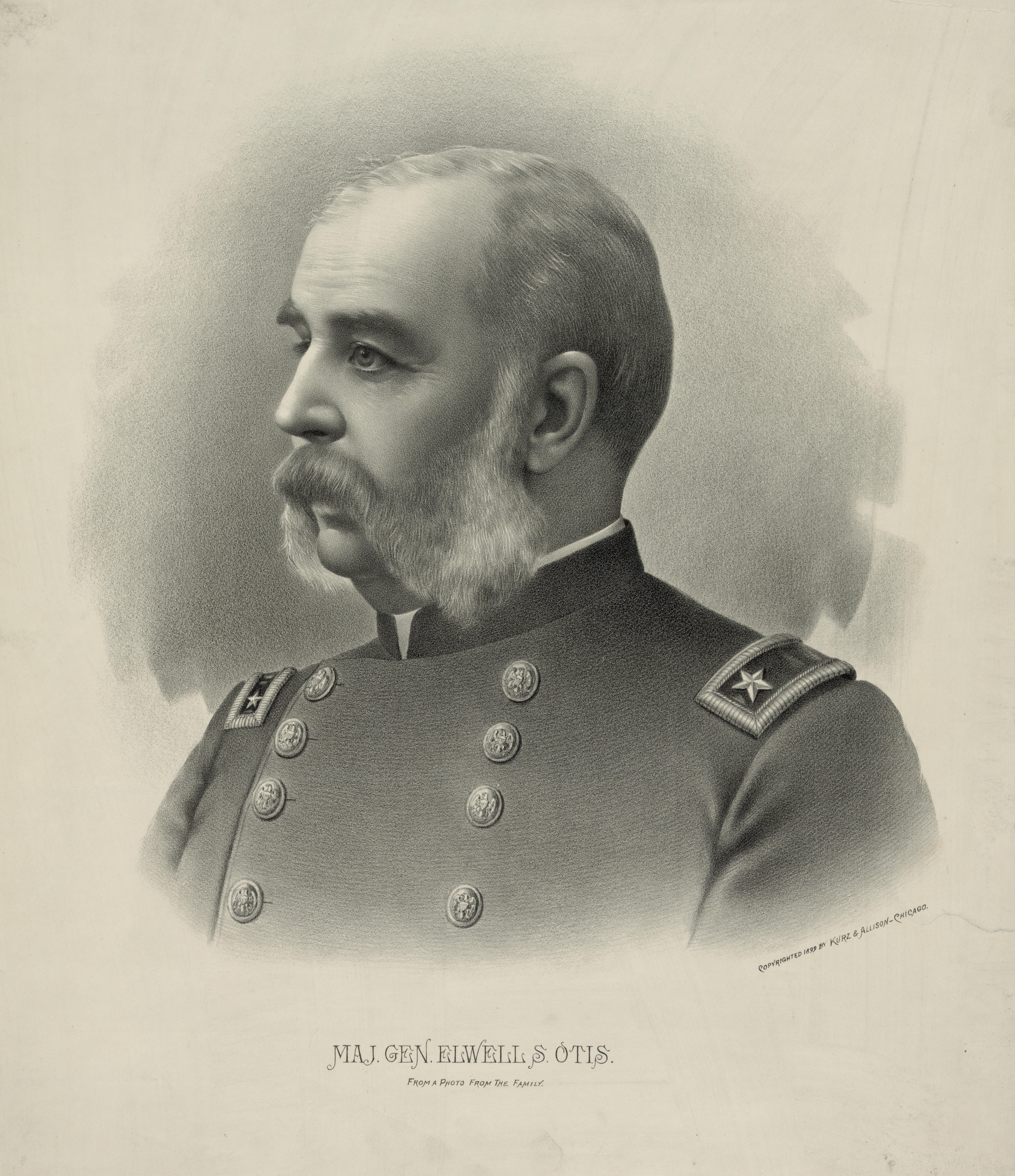

2nd Military Governor of the Philippines
- In office August 28, 1898 – May 5, 1900
- President: William McKinley
- Preceded by: Wesley Merritt
- Succeeded by: Arthur MacArthur Jr.

Member of the Schurman Commission
- In office March 4, 1899 – March 16, 1900
- Governor-General: Jacob Gould Schurman
- Preceded by: Position established
- Succeeded by: Bernard Moses (Taft Commission)

Personal details
- Born: March 25, 1838 Frederick, Maryland, U.S.
- Died: October 21, 1909 (aged 71) Rochester, New York, U.S.
- Spouses: Louise Selden; Louisa Bowman
- Education: University of Rochester; Harvard Law School
- Nickname: "Granny"

Military service
- Allegiance: United States of America
- Branch/service: United States Army; Union Army
- Years of service: 1862–1902
- Rank: Major General
- Unit: (New York (state)) 140th New York Volunteer Infantry Regiment
- Commands: 20th Infantry Regiment; Eighth Army Corps
- Battles/wars: American Civil War; Battle of Fredericksburg; Battle of Gettysburg; Siege of Petersburg; Battle of Peebles' Farm; Indian Wars; Great Sioux War; Spanish–American War; Philippine–American War; Battle of Manila

Elwell Stephen Otis (March 25, 1838 – October 21, 1909) was a United States Army general who served in the American Civil War, Indian Wars, the Philippines late in the Spanish–American War and during the Philippine–American War.

== Biography ==
Otis was born in Frederick, Maryland on March 25, 1838. He attended the University of Rochester, where he was a member of the Iota chapter of St. Anthony Hall aka the Fraternity of Delta Psi. He graduated from Harvard Law School in 1860 and was practicing law during the first year of the Civil War.

=== Civil War ===
During the American Civil War, Otis was appointed captain in the 140th New York Volunteer Infantry Regiment formed in Rochester, NY in September 1862. He fought at the battles of Fredericksburg, Chancellorsville and Gettysburg. On December 23, 1863, he was promoted to lieutenant colonel of his regiment. At the Battle of Spotsylvania the regiment's colonel was killed and Otis assumed command. He fought in all the battles of the Overland Campaign. During the Siege of Petersburg, he assumed command of the 1st Brigade, 2nd Division in V Corps leading it into action at the Battle of Peebles' Farm. During this battle he was severely wounded, which effectively ended his field career during the Civil War. He was promoted to brevet brigadier general of volunteers for actions at Peebles' Farm. Otis eventually recovered and was appointed lieutenant colonel of the 22nd U.S. Infantry in 1867.

=== Indian Wars ===
Otis continued serving in the army during the Indian Wars as part of the 22nd U.S. including campaigning in Montana in the aftermath of the Battle of the Little Bighorn. On February 8, 1880, he was appointed colonel of the 20th U.S. Infantry. On November 28, 1893, he was appointed brigadier general in the regular army. He later commanded the Department of the Columbia and the Department of Colorado.

=== Philippine–American War ===
On May 4, 1898, he was appointed major general of volunteers and was sent to the Philippines with reinforcements for General Wesley Merritt. Otis assumed command of the Eighth Army Corps, replacing Merritt, who had become the military governor of the Philippines. Merritt served as military governor only briefly before he returned to the United States. On August 28, 1898, Otis was appointed Military Governor for the Philippines.

He also continued in command of Eighth Corps during the Philippine–American War. He conducted the U.S. Army during the Battle of Manila in 1899 and during the first phase of the insurrection before fighting turned primarily to guerrilla warfare. When Filipino General Emilio Aguinaldo tried to stop the war by sending an emissary to General Otis to appeal for an end to the fighting in the Second Battle of Manila, Otis rejected it, insisting that "fighting, having begun, must go on to the grim end."

In May 1899, the American Anti-Imperialist League published a pamphlet of letters allegedly written by U.S. soldiers in the Philippines that documented numerous atrocities committed by troops, leading to a wide public backlash against Otis and the war. In response, Otis denied to the press that any abuses had been committed, and tracked down the authors of the letters, threatening them with a court-martial if they did not immediately write a retraction. Despite his attempts to prevent reports of atrocities from reaching the press, Otis did admit that he suspected his troops of having committed atrocities, stating:

The conduct of the Washington Volunteers has been the subject of special investigations for some time. They deny wanton burning or cruelties. And still there are strong indications that they practiced these infractions to some extent.

=== Later life ===
He was relieved of command in 1900 and replaced by Arthur MacArthur Jr., the father of Douglas MacArthur. He returned to Rochester, NY to a grand reception on June 15, 1900. The City erected a 50 ft. "Arc de Triomphe"-style arch over its two main streets recognizing his war accomplishments. He went on to commanded the Department of the Lakes. He was appointed major general in the regular army in 1906.

Otis was a skilled general and able administrator. However, he was generally disliked by his subordinates and peers and received harsh treatment in the press. He was known as "Granny" by his troops because of his age and graying hair. On the other hand, Rudolph Rau writes of Otis' work in the Philippines that "He delegated no authority, was pompous and fuzzy, and inspired few". He died in Rochester, New York on October 21, 1909, from painful angina. He was buried in Mt. Hope Cemetery, along with other noted Rochesterians Frederick Douglas and Susan B. Anthony, but his remains were later moved to Arlington National Cemetery.

=== Family ===
Elwell S. Otis married twice. His first wife was Louise Selden. They married in 1870, and had two daughters:

1. Laura Lu Otis born 1872 in North Dakota. Married Harry K. Elston.
2. Mary L. Otis born 1875 in New York. Married Ralph Isham.

His second wife was Louisa Bowman, the daughter of Alexander Hamilton Bowman and Marie Louisa Collins. The couple had one child. They were married in 1878.

1. Louise B. Otis born February 21, 1882, in Kansas and died December 27, 1963, in Santa Barbara, California. She married George Wagner.

Louisa "Lulu" Otis, the widow of Elwell Otis died in Santa Barbara, California on June 8, 1934.

Coat of Arms of Elwell Stephen Otis

== Legacy ==
For many years on June 15, Rochester, New York celebrated Otis Day. This is no longer the case.

== Portrayal in the media ==
- Portrayed by E.A. Rocha in the Philippine film, Heneral Luna (2015), and its sequel, Goyo: Ang Batang Heneral (2018).

Military offices
New title	Commandant of the Command and General Staff College; November 1881 – June 1885	Succeeded by Thomas Howard Ruger
Government offices
Preceded by Wesley Merritt	Military Governor of the Philippines; August 28, 1898 – May 5, 1900	Succeeded by Arthur MacArthur, Jr
Political offices
New creation	Member of the Schurman Commission; March 4, 1899 – March 16, 1900	Succeeded by Bernard Moses (Taft Commission)
