= Jacob Gould Schurman =

American diplomat (1854–1942)

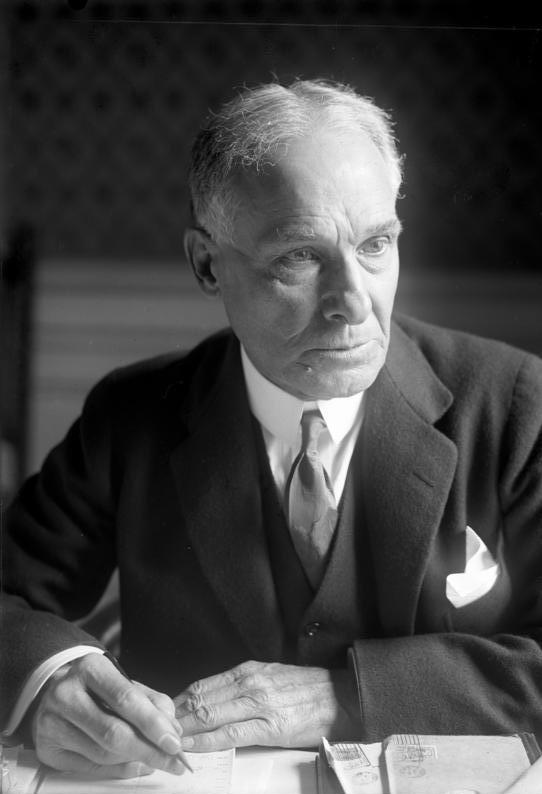
- Schurman in 1930

9th United States Ambassador to Germany
- In office June 29, 1925 – January 21, 1930
- President: Calvin Coolidge; Herbert Hoover
- Preceded by: Alanson B. Houghton
- Succeeded by: Frederic M. Sackett

United States Minister to China
- In office September 12, 1921 – April 15, 1925
- President: Warren G. Harding; Calvin Coolidge
- Preceded by: Paul Reinsch
- Succeeded by: John Van Antwerp MacMurray

4th United States Minister to Montenegro
- In office July 21, 1913 – August 18, 1913
- President: Woodrow Wilson
- Preceded by: George H. Moses
- Succeeded by: George F. Williams

United States Minister to Greece
- In office October 17, 1912 – August 18, 1913
- President: William Howard Taft; Woodrow Wilson
- Preceded by: George H. Moses
- Succeeded by: George F. Williams

Chairman of the First Philippine Commission
- In office January 20, 1899 – March 16, 1900
- President: William McKinley
- Deputy: Elwell Otis
- Preceded by: Diego de los Ríos (as Governor-General of the Philippines)
- Succeeded by: William Howard Taft (as Governor-General)

President of Cornell University
- In office 1892–1920
- Preceded by: Charles Kendall Adams
- Succeeded by: Livingston Farrand

Personal details
- Born: May 2, 1854 Freetown, Prince Edward Island, Canada
- Died: August 12, 1942 (aged 88) Bedford Hills, New York, U.S.
- Relations: George Munro (father-in-law)
- Children: 7, including Dorothy Schurman Hawes

Jacob Gould Schurman (May 2, 1854 – August 12, 1942) was a Canadian-American educator and diplomat, who served as President of Cornell University and United States Ambassador to Germany.

== Early life and education ==
Schurman was born at Freetown, Prince Edward Island, Canada, on May 2, 1854 the son of Robert and Lydia Schurman. Schurman lived on his parents' farm as a child, then in 1867 took a job at a store near his home, which he held for two years.

At the age of fifteen, Schurman entered the Summerside Grammar School on Prince Edward Island, and in 1870 he won a scholarship to study at Prince of Wales College for two years. After Prince of Wales College, he studied for a year and a half at Acadia College in Nova Scotia.

In 1874, while a student at Acadia College in Wolfville, Nova Scotia, he won the Canadian Gilchrist scholarship to study at the University of London, from which he received a BA degree in 1877 and an MA in 1878. Schurman also studied in Paris, Edinburgh, Heidelberg, Berlin, Göttingen, and Italy.

== Career ==
He was professor of English literature, political economy and psychology at Acadia College from 1880 to 1882, of metaphysics and English literature at Dalhousie College, Halifax, Nova Scotia, in 1882–86, and the Sage professor of philosophy (Sage professor) at Cornell University from 1886 to 1892, and Dean of the Sage School of Philosophy from 1891 to 1892, during which edited The Philosophical Review.

In 1892, he became the third president of Cornell University, a position he held until 1920. He received an LL.D (honoris causa) from the University of Edinburgh in March 1902.

=== Cornell University president ===
As president of Cornell University, Schurman helped invent the modern state-supported research university. Under the Morrill Act, states were obligated to fund the maintenance of land grant college facilities, but were not obligated to fund operations. Subsequent laws required states to match federal funds for agricultural research stations and cooperative extension.

In his inaugural address as Cornell's third president on November 11, 1892, Schurman announced his intention to enlist the financial support of the state. Cornell, which had been offering a four-year scholarship to one student in each New York assembly district every year and was the state's land-grant university, was determined to convince the state to become a benefactor of the university.

In 1894, the state legislature voted to give financial support for the establishment of the New York State College of Veterinary Medicine and to make annual appropriations for the college. This set the precedents of privately controlled, state-supported statutory colleges and cooperation between Cornell and the state. The annual state appropriations were later extended to agriculture, home economics, and following World War II, industrial and labor relations.

==== New York State College of Forestry at Cornell ====
In 1898, Schurman persuaded the State Legislature to found the first forestry college in North America, the New York State College of Forestry. The College undertook to establish a 30,000-acre (120 km^{2}) demonstration forest in the Adirondacks, funded by New York State. However, the plans of the school's director Bernhard Fernow for the land drew criticism from neighbors, and Governor Benjamin B. Odell vetoed the 1903 appropriation for the school.

In response, Cornell closed the school. Subsequently, in 1911, the State Legislature established a New York State College of Forestry at Syracuse University, and the remains of Cornell's program became the Department of Natural Resources in its Agriculture College in 1910. The State later followed the same model to establish a state college of ceramics at Alfred University.

Schurman was elected to the American Philosophical Society in 1908.

In 1911, Schurman ruled in favor of admitting two Black female students to Sage Hall despite 269 of their white female peers petitioning to deny them residency.

=== International and governmental career ===
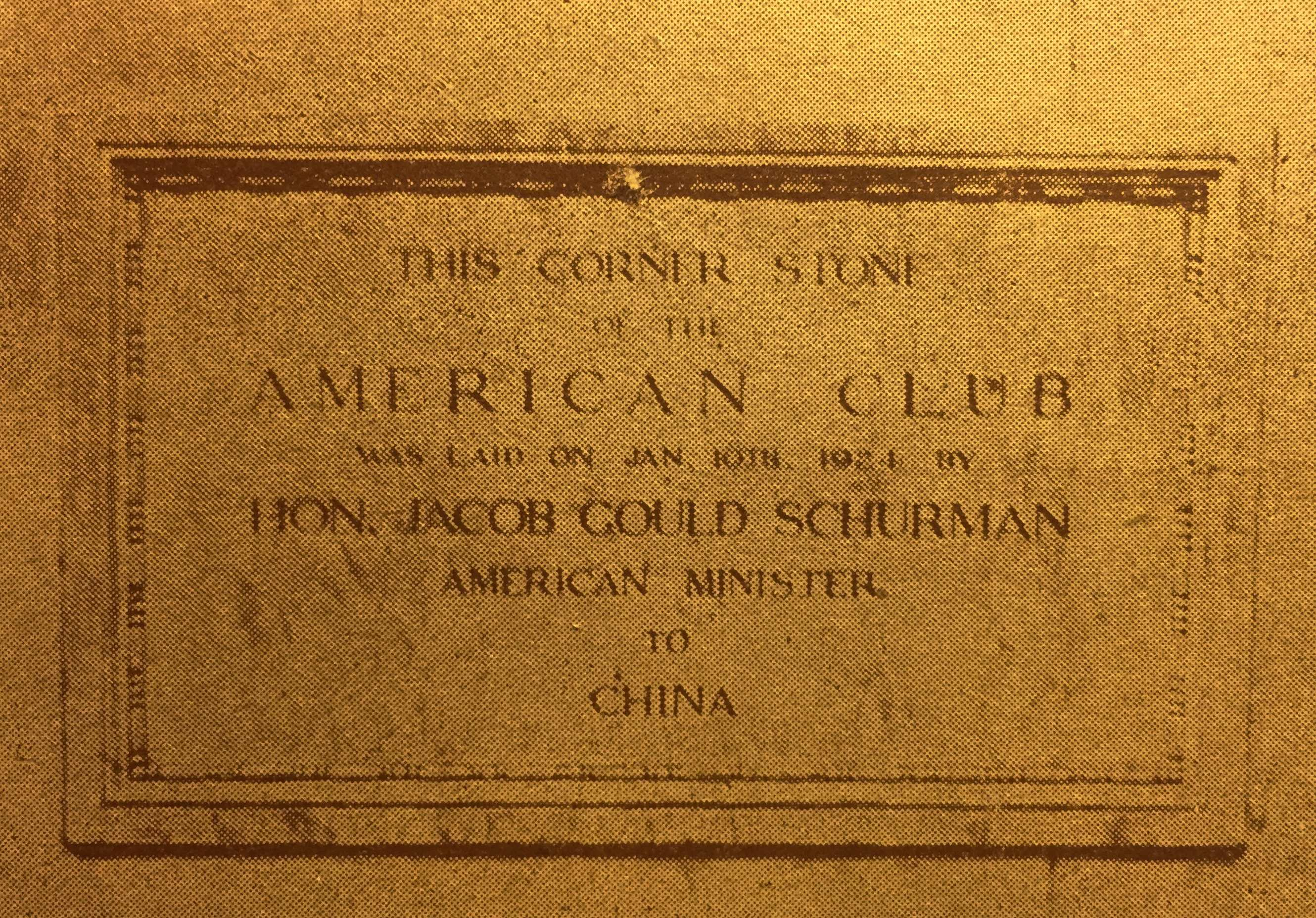
The cornerstone of the Shanghai American Club laid by Schurman in 1924

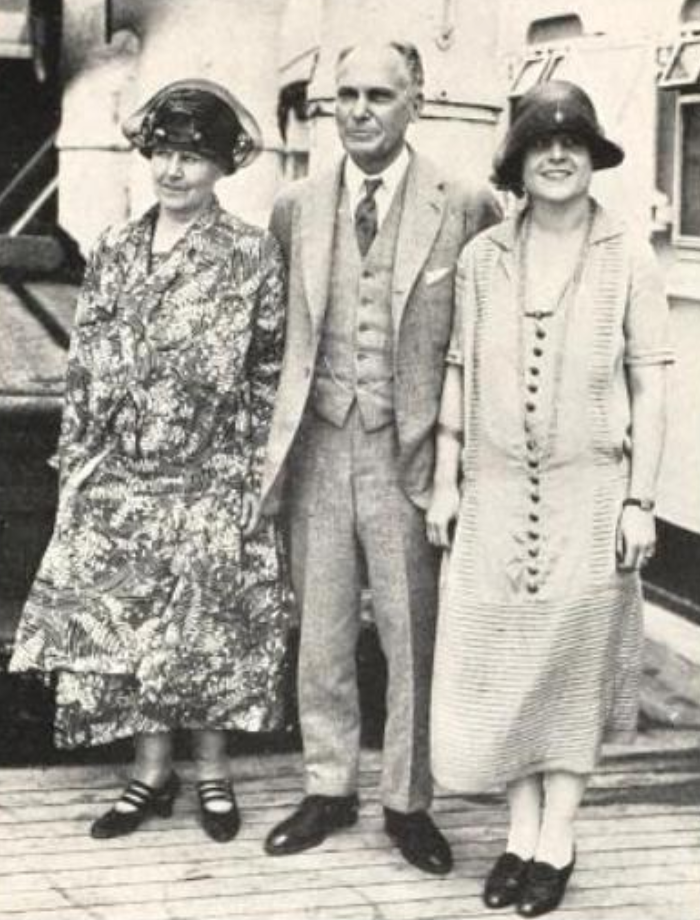
Schurman with his wife and youngest daughter Dorothy Schurman Hawes in 1925

He was the chairman of the First United States Philippine Commission in 1899, and wrote a part of the official report to Congress and Philippine Affairs--A Retrospect and an Outlook (1902). With J. E. Creighton and James Seth he founded in 1892 The Philosophical Review. He also wrote Kantian Ethics and the Ethics of Evolution (1881); The Ethical Import of Darwinism (1888); Belief in God (1890), and Agnosticism and Religion (1896).

Schurman served as United States Ambassador to Greece and Montenegro in 1912–13. In 1914 he declared support for female suffrage.

During World War I he insisted that American rights be respected; after the sinking of the Lusitania he pointed out that the action threatened to erase the distinction between combatants and non-combatants. In 1917 he was appointed a member of the New York State Food Commission, but resigned in June 1918 to go to France as lecturer to American soldiers.

After the war, he opposed many of the policies of Woodrow Wilson, but under Warren Harding, after resigning as president of Cornell in 1920, he was Minister to China between 1921 and 1925, and then as Ambassador to Germany between 1925 and 1929, a position twice previously held by Cornell's first president Andrew Dickson White. In 1917 Schurman was appointed honorary chairman of the American Relief Committee for Greeks of Asia Minor, an organization which provided humanitarian relief to Ottoman Greeks during the Greek genocide. He retired to Bedford Hills, New York in 1930.

In 1960, Cornell named the administrative wing of its veterinary school Jacob Gould Schurman Hall in his honor. In 2021, the Cornell Filipino Association sought to discredit Schurman due to the work of the Philippine Commission and demanded that his name be removed from the building. After hearing from both sides, Cornell President Martha Pollack rejected the move. In 1967, Jacob Gould Schurman III endowed the Schurman professorships in his honor. Cornell describes them as "one of the most prestigious chairs at the university."

== Personal life ==
Schurman married Barbara Forrest Munro (1865–1930) in 1884; they had seven children, including youngest daughter Dorothy Schurman Hawes, who wrote about China. Schurman's father-in-law was George Munro; in 1881, he endowed Schurman the chair in English literature and philosophy at Dalhousie University, where Munro was the principal benefactor.

== Notes ==
Academic offices
Preceded by Charles Kendall Adams	President of Cornell University; 1892–1920	Succeeded by Livingston Farrand
Government offices
Preceded by Newly created	President of the Schurman Commission (First Philippine Commission); March 4, 1899–March 16, 1900	Succeeded by William Howard Taft (Taft Commission)
Diplomatic posts
Preceded by George H. Moses	United States Minister to Greece; 1912–1913	Succeeded by George F. Williams
Preceded by Paul Reinsch	United States Envoy to the Republic of China; 1921–1925	Succeeded by John MacMurray
Preceded by Alanson B. Houghton	United States Ambassador to Germany; 1925–1929	Succeeded by Frederic M. Sackett
