= Bibliography of Dorothea Dix =

Dorothea Lynde Dix
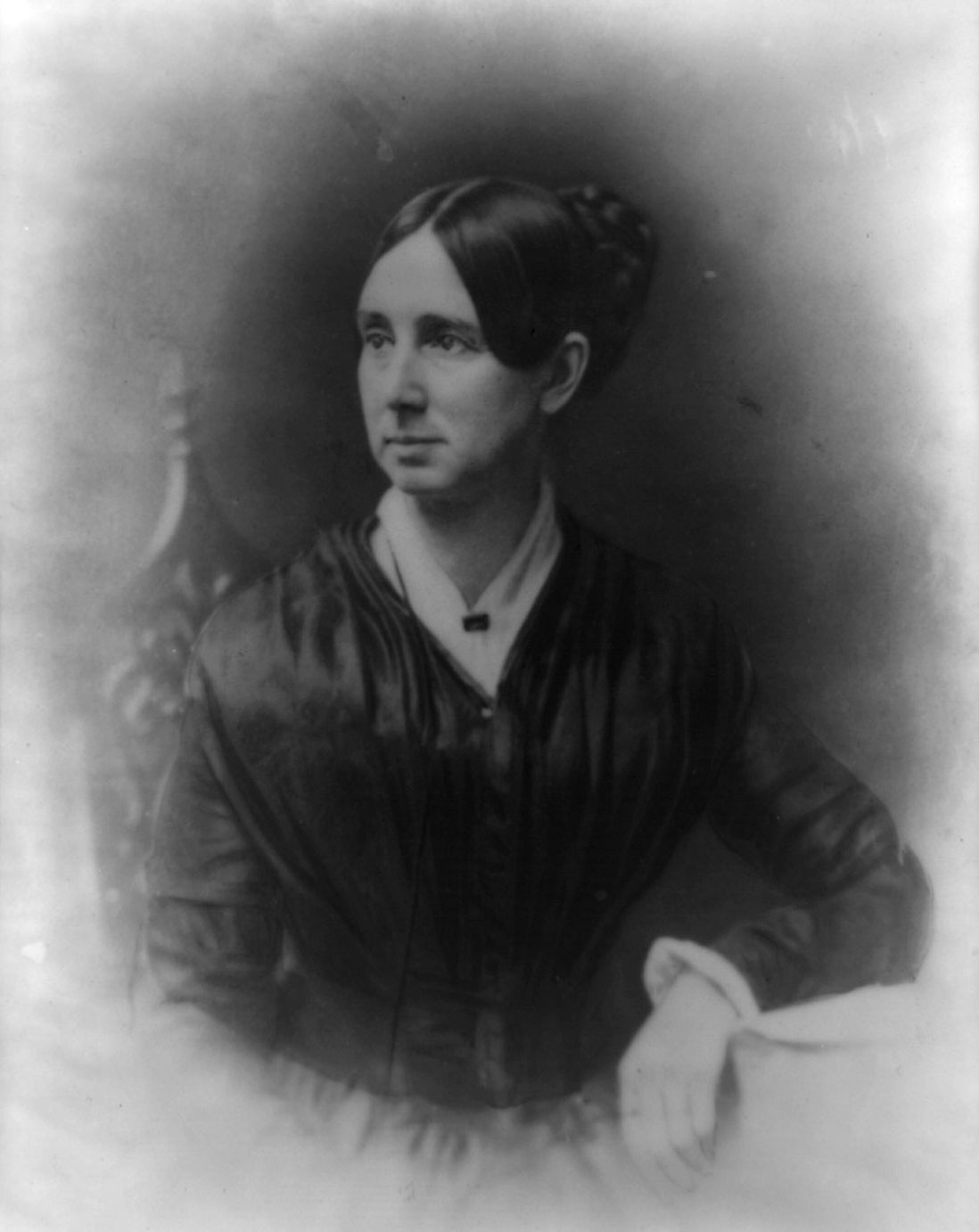
- Born: Dorothea Lynde Dix; April 4, 1802; Hampden, Massachusetts (District of Maine), US
- Died: July 17, 1887 (aged 85); Trenton, New Jersey, US
- Occupation: Social reformer
- Parent(s): Joseph Dix; Mary Bigelow

This is a bibliography of works about and principal works by Dorothea Dix.

Dorothea Lynde Dix (April 4, 1802 – July 17, 1887) was an American advocate on behalf of the poor mentally ill. By her vigorous and sustained program of lobbying state legislatures and the United States Congress, she helped create the first generation of American mental asylums. During the Civil War, she served as a Superintendent of Army Nurses.

Works listed here are cited in the notes or bibliographies of scholarly sources. Each is published by an academic or major press, written by a recognized expert, or substantially reviewed in scholarly journals; borderline cases are omitted. A selection of primary sources are included. Many of the books below carry their own bibliographies; see the Further reading section for other bibliographies, and the External links section for historical sites, academic sites, and museums.

Citations follow APA style. (Note: Entries are in plain text APA 7 format without templates; templates are used only for reviews and notes.) Book have citations to academic journal or mainstream published reviews when available. For books only partly about the subject, relevant chapter or section titles are provided when useful and available. Translators of the original-language edition are included when possible. In cases where a title or name has appeared with more than one English spelling, the most recent published form is used and a footnote documents any earlier title under which the work appeared.

== Biographies ==
- Brown, T. J. (1998). Dorothea Dix: New England reformer. Harvard University Press.
- Dorothea Lynde Dix. (1949). American Journal of Public Health and the Nations Health, 39(3), 372–374. doi:10.2105/ajph.39.3.372
- Gollaher, D. L. (1993). Dorothea Dix and the English origins of the American asylum movement. Canadian Review of American Studies, 23(3), 149–176. doi:10.3138/cras-023-03-07
- Gollaher, D. L. (1995). Voice for the mad: The life of Dorothea Dix. Free Press.
- Marshall, H. E. (1937). Dorothea Dix: Forgotten samaritan. University of North Carolina Press.
- Muckenhoupt, M. (2003). Dorothea Dix: Advocate for mental health care. Oxford University Press.
- Parry, M. S. (2006). Dorothea Dix (1802–1887). American Journal of Public Health, 96(4), 624–625. doi:10.2105/ajph.2005.079152
- Tiffany, F. (1891). Life of Dorothea Lynde Dix. Houghton, Mifflin.
- Viney, W., & Zorich, S. (1982). Contributions to the history of psychology: XXIX. Dorothea Dix and the history of psychology. Psychological Reports, 50(1), 211–218. doi:10.2466/pr0.1982.50.1.211
- Wilson, D. C. (1975). Stranger and traveler: The story of Dorothea Dix, American reformer. Little, Brown.
- Wood, A. G. (1999). Dix, Dorothea Lynde (04 April 1802–17 July 1887), social reformer. In American National Biography Online. doi:10.1093/anb/9780198606697.article.1500181

== Topical works ==
- Attie, J. (1998). Patriotic toil: Northern women and the American Civil War. Cornell University Press.
- Boylan, A. M. (2002). The origins of women's activism: New York and Boston, 1797–1840. University of North Carolina Press.
- Dain, N. (1964). Concepts of insanity in the United States, 1789–1865. Rutgers University Press.
- Deutsch, A. (1937). The mentally ill in America: A history of their care and treatment from colonial times. Columbia University Press.
- Dwyer, E. (1987). Homes for the mad: Life inside two nineteenth-century asylums. Rutgers University Press.
- Freedman, E. B. (1981). Their sisters' keepers: Women's prison reform in America, 1830–1930. University of Michigan Press.
- Giesberg, J. A. (2000). Civil War sisterhood: The U.S. Sanitary Commission and women's politics in transition. Northeastern University Press.
- Ginzberg, L. D. (1990). Women and the work of benevolence: Morality, politics, and class in the nineteenth-century United States. Yale University Press.
- Grob, G. N. (1966). The state and the mentally ill: A history of Worcester State Hospital in Massachusetts, 1830–1920. University of North Carolina Press.
- Grob, G. N. (1973). Mental institutions in America: Social policy to 1875. Free Press.
- Grob, G. N. (1983). Mental illness and American society, 1875–1940. Princeton University Press.
- Grob, G. N. (1994). The mad among us: A history of the care of America's mentally ill. Free Press.
- Jimenez, M. A. (1987). Changing faces of madness: Early American attitudes and treatment of the insane. University Press of New England.
- Leonard, E. D. (1994). Yankee women: Gender battles in the Civil War. Norton.
- Maher, M. D. (1989). To bind up the wounds: Catholic sister nurses in the U.S. Civil War. Greenwood Press.
- Melosh, B. (1982). "The physician's hand": Work culture and conflict in American nursing. Temple University Press.
- Meranze, M. (1996). Laboratories of virtue: Punishment, revolution, and authority in Philadelphia, 1760–1835. University of North Carolina Press.
- Moran, J. E. (1998). Asylum in the community: Managing the insane in antebellum America. History of Psychiatry, 9(34), 217–240. doi:10.1177/0957154x9800903405
- Reiss, B. (2008). Theaters of madness: Insane asylums and nineteenth-century American culture. University of Chicago Press.
- Reverby, S. M. (1987). Ordered to care: The dilemma of American nursing, 1850–1945. Cambridge University Press.
- Rothman, D. J. (1971). The discovery of the asylum: Social order and disorder in the new republic. Little, Brown.
- Schultz, J. E. (1994). Race, gender, and bureaucracy: Civil War army nurses and the pension bureau. Journal of Women's History, 6(2), 45–69. doi:10.1353/jowh.2010.0384
- Schultz, J. E. (2004). Women at the front: Hospital workers in Civil War America. University of North Carolina Press.
- Scull, A. (1993). The most solitary of afflictions: Madness and society in Britain, 1700–1900. Yale University Press.
- Sutton, J. R. (1991). The political economy of madness: The expansion of the asylum in Progressive America. American Sociological Review, 56(5), 665. JSTOR 2096087
- Tomes, N. (1984). A generous confidence: Thomas Story Kirkbride and the art of asylum-keeping, 1840–1883. Cambridge University Press.
- Wood, A. D. (1972). The war within a war: Women nurses in the Union Army. Civil War History, 18(3), 197–212. doi:10.1353/cwh.1972.0046
- Yanni, C. (2007). The architecture of madness: Insane asylums in the United States. University of Minnesota Press.

== Primary sources ==
- Brockett, L. P., & Vaughan, M. C. (1867). Woman's work in the Civil War: A record of heroism, patriotism and patience. Zeigler, McCurdy.
- Dix, D. L. (1828). Conversations on common things; or, Guide to knowledge, with questions (3rd ed.). Munroe & Francis.
- Dix, D. L. (1829). The garland of Flora. S. G. Goodrich & Co.; Carter & Hendee.
- Dix, D. L. (1832). American moral tales for young persons. L. C. Bowles & B. H. Greene.
- Dix, D. L. (1843). Memorial to the Legislature of Massachusetts. Munroe & Francis.
- Dix, D. L. (1845). Memorial soliciting a state hospital for the insane: Submitted to the Legislature of New Jersey, January 23, 1845.
- Dix, D. L. (1845). Memorial soliciting a state hospital for the insane: Submitted to the Legislature of Pennsylvania, February 3, 1845. J. M. G. Lescure.
- Dix, D. L. (1845). Remarks on prisons and prison discipline in the United States. Joseph Kite & Co.
- Dix, D. L. (1846). A review of the present condition of the State Penitentiary of Kentucky, with brief notices and remarks upon the jails and poor houses. A. G. Hodges.
- Dix, D. L. (1846). Memorial soliciting an appropriation for the State Hospital for the Insane at Lexington: And also urging the necessity for establishing a new hospital in the Green River country. A. G. Hodges.
- Dix, D. L. (1847). Memorial of Miss D. L. Dix in relation to the Illinois Penitentiary.
- Dix, D. L. (1847). Memorial soliciting enlarged and improved accommodations for the insane of the state of Tennessee by the establishment of a new hospital. B. R. M'Kennie.
- Dix, D. L. (1848). Memorial soliciting a state hospital for the protection and cure of the insane: Submitted to the General Assembly of North Carolina, November, 1848. Seaton Gales.
- Dix, D. L. (1852). Memorial of Miss D. L. Dix to the Hon. the General Assembly in behalf of the insane of Maryland. Maryland House of Delegates.
- Dix, D. L. (1975). The lady and the president: The letters of Dorothea Dix & Millard Fillmore (C. M. Snyder, Ed.). University Press of Kentucky.
- Dix, D. L. (1999). Asylum, prison, and poorhouse: The writings and reform work of Dorothea Dix in Illinois (D. L. Lightner, Ed.). Southern Illinois University Press.
- Dix, D. L. (2006). "I tell what I have seen"—The reports of asylum reformer Dorothea Dix. American Journal of Public Health, 96(4), 622–624. doi:10.2105/ajph.96.4.622
- Dix, D. L. (1857). Memorial of D. L. Dix, praying a grant of land for the relief and support of the indigent curable and incurable insane in the United States. The Asylum Journal of Mental Science, 4(23), 129–164. doi:10.1192/s2514992x00001797
- Dorothea L. Dix. (1887). Journal of Mental Science, 33(143), 477–479. doi:10.1192/bjp.33.143.477
- Holland, M. A. G. (1895). Our army nurses: Interesting sketches, addresses, and photographs of nearly one hundred of the noble women who served in hospitals and on battlefields during our Civil War. B. Wilkins & Co.

== See also ==
- Kirkbride Plan
- Dorothea Dix Hospital
- Louisa May Alcott
- Addie L. Ballou
- Mary Ann Bickerdyke
- Louisa Hawkins Canby
- Lois Dunbar
- Helen L. Gilson
- Mary Phinney von Olnhausen
- Virginia Gonzalez Torres
