= USS Dorothea L. Dix =

U.S. Navy transport ship

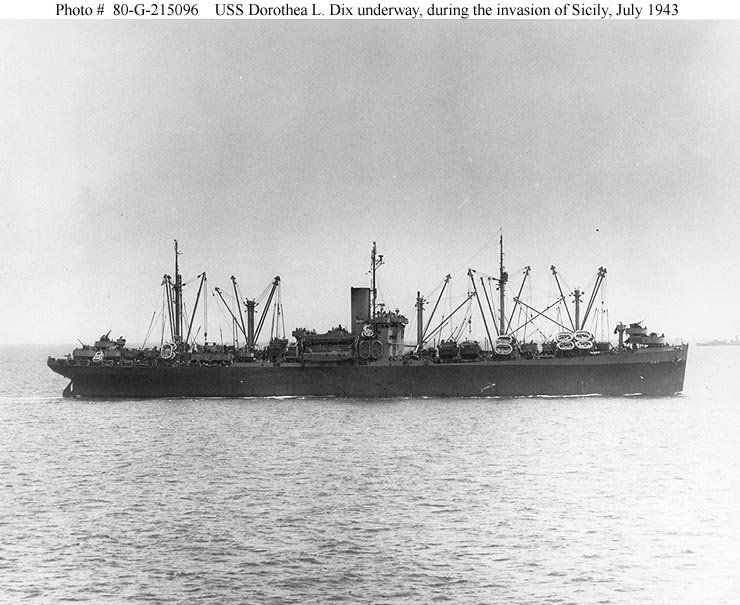
- Dorothea L. Dix underway, 10 July 1943, the first day of the invasion of Sicily. A paravane is visible near the waterline about a third back from the bow.

History

United States
- Name: Dorothea L. Dix
- Namesake: Dorothea Dix
- Builder: Bethlehem Shipbuilding Corporation's Fore River Shipyard, Quincy, Massachusetts
- Launched: 22 June 1940
- Acquired: 13 September 1942
- Commissioned: 17 September 1942
- Decommissioned: 24 April 1946
- Honors and awards: 5 battle stars (World War II)
- Fate: Sold 1946, scrapped 1968

General characteristics
- Type: Type C3 class ship
- Displacement: 11,625 long tons (11,812 t)
- Length: 473 ft (144 m)
- Beam: 66 ft (20 m)
- Draft: 22 ft 6 in (6.86 m)
- Speed: 16 knots (30 km/h; 18 mph)
- Complement: 422 officers and enlisted
- Armament: 1 × 4 in (100 mm) gun; 4 × 3 in (76 mm) guns

USS Dorothea L. Dix (AP-67) was a transport ship of the United States Navy named for American activist Dorothea Dix (1802–1887).

== Construction and career ==
Dorothea L. Dix was launched on 22 June 1940 as Exemplar by Bethlehem Steel Company, Quincy, Massachusetts, under a Maritime Commission contract; sponsored by Miss P. J. Kalloch; transferred to the Navy on 13 September 1942; and commissioned on 17 September 1942.

=== Mediterranean, 1942–1943 ===
Putting to sea from Cove Point, Maryland, on 23 October 1942, Dorothea L. Dix sailed with Task Force 34 (TF 34) to land Army troops and supply scout boats in the assault at Safi, French Morocco, from 8 to 12 November, during "Operation Torch". She returned to Norfolk on 24 November. Between 12 December 1942 and 5 April 1943 she made two more transatlantic voyages to Oran, Algeria, carrying Army troops and nurses.

After amphibious training at Norfolk, she sailed on 8 June 1943 for Oran, arriving on 22 June. On 5 July she got underway for the invasion of Sicily, arriving off Scoglitti late on 9 July and debarking her troops and cargo early the next day under heavy air attack. She embarked wounded and one Italian prisoner and returned to Oran on 15 July. A week later she was en route to New York, arriving on 3 August to debark her passengers, German prisoners of war. A similar voyage was made to Oran between 21 August and 21 September after which she sailed on 8 October for the United Kingdom.

Dorothea L. Dix arrived at Gourock Bay, Scotland, on 17 October 1943, and sailed ten days later for Algiers where she exchanged troops for 243 survivors of Beatty (DD-640) and for Oran to embark Army troops. She unloaded cargo at Gourock Bay between 24 and 30 November then sailed to New York, arriving on 11 December. Between 29 December 1943 and 10 March 1944 she carried troops on two voyages from New York to Gourock Bay and Liverpool.

=== Normandy landings, 1944 ===
On 23 March 1944 Dorothea L. Dix sailed from New York for Belfast, Northern Ireland, arriving on 3 April. After amphibious training in the Clyde area, she sortied with Temporary Transport Division 97 from the Isle of Portland, England, on 5 June for the invasion landings at Normandy the following day. She returned to Weymouth Bay on the 7th to debark casualties, then embarked troops in the Clyde area and tanks at Avonmouth which she carried to Naples, arriving on 16 July.

Ernest Hemingway wrote a first-hand account of the Normandy landings from the Dix for Collier's.

=== Mediterranean, 1944 ===
She put out from Naples on 13 August 1944 for the invasion of southern France two days later, unloading tanks and Army troops for the assault landings. She continued to support this operation by carrying French, British, and Italian as well as American troops to Baie de la Cavalaire and Marseille from Naples and Oran until 22 October. Three days later she left Oran for New York, arriving on 8 November.

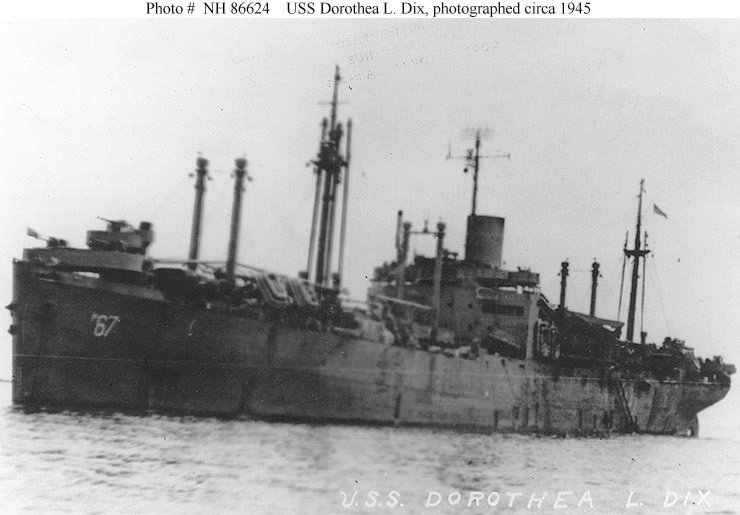
Dorothea L. Dix (AP-67) at anchor, c. 1945, place unknown

=== Pacific, 1945–1946 ===
Dorothea L. Dix put to sea from New York on 18 December 1944, and arrived at San Francisco on 4 January 1945. Two weeks later she sailed to carry Army troops to Pearl Harbor, returning to San Francisco on 2 February. After a voyage to Attu, to transport Army troops to Aleutian Islands she proceeded to Okinawa arriving on 1 May. Here she landed support troops and embarked casualties and naval passengers for San Francisco, arriving on 27 May.

Between 10 June 1945 and 9 February 1946 Dorothea L. Dix operated on transport duty from San Francisco and other west coast ports to the Philippines, carrying replacements to the Pacific and returning veterans. She sailed to New York on 29 March 1946, was decommissioned there on 24 April 1946, and returned to the Maritime Commission for disposal the same day. In commercial service until sold 13 December 1968 to Aguilar y Peria, S.L., Spain for scrap.

== Awards ==
Dorothea L. Dix received five battle stars for World War II service.

== See also ==
- List of U.S. military vessels named after women.
- Bibliography of Dorothea Dix

== Bibliography ==
- Silverstone, Paul H. (2008). The Navy of World War II, 1922-1947. The U.S. Navy Warship Series. New York: Routledge. ISBN 978-0-415-97898-9.
