= John G. Marler =

North Carolina state legislator (died 1877)

John G. Marler (died 1877) was a state legislator in North Carolina. He served two terms in the North Carolina House of Representatives and then served in the North Carolina Senate.

He was born in Virginia. He lived in Yadkin County and represented counties including Yadkin County and Alleghany County. He married Sallie Stimpson and had five children including William H. Marler.

General E. R. S. Canby appointed him to a seat at the 1868 Constitutional Convention in Raleigh. He represented Yadkin County.

John M. Marshall replaced him in the North Carolina House in 1868 after a committee's ruling on the election.

In 1877 his widow was awarded his per diem.

There is a book about the Marler family's history.
