= John Parker Hawkins =

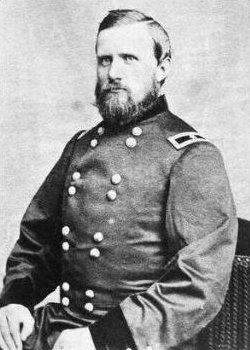
- Brig. Gen. John Parker Hawkins
- Born: September 29, 1830; Indianapolis, Indiana, US
- Died: February 7, 1914 (aged 83); Indianapolis, Indiana, US
- Burial place: Crown Hill Cemetery, Indianapolis, Indiana, Section 1, Lot 55; 39.8189897°N 86.1738738°W
- Relatives: Louisa Hawkins Canby (sister); Edward Canby (brother-in-law)
- Military career
- Allegiance: United States of America; Union
- Branch: United States Army; Union Army
- Service years: 1852–1894
- Rank: Brigadier General; Brevet Major General
- Units: 2nd US Infantry; 6th US Infantry
- Commands: 1st Brigade, USCT; 1st Division, USCT; Commissary General of Subsistence
- Conflicts: American Civil War; Battle of Fort Blakeley

John Parker Hawkins (September 29, 1830 – February 7, 1914) was a career officer of the United States Army who served as brigadier general during the American Civil War, in which he served as a commissary officer and as a commander of colored troops. After the war he remained in the army and rose to the position of Commissary General of Subsistence of the United States Army.

== Early life ==
Hawkins was born in Indianapolis, Indiana, the son of John Hawkins and Elizabeth (née Waller); his elder sister was Louisa Hawkins Canby (who married Major General Edward Canby). He graduated from West Point in 1852 as 40th out of 43 cadets, and joined the 2nd US Infantry. When the Civil War began in 1861 he was a First Lieutenant and Regimental Quartermaster of the 6th US Infantry.

== Civil War ==
Parker was promoted to captain on August 3, 1861, and was posted to Missouri to serve as a Commissary of Subsistence. He was sent to western Tennessee in 1862, and was promoted to lieutenant colonel on November 1 that year. The following month he became the Commissary General for Gen. Grant's Army of the Tennessee. On April 25, 1863, President Abraham Lincoln appointed Hawkins Brigadier General in the U.S. Volunteers, with effect from April 13, 1863. However, the U.S. Senate returned the nomination to the President on April 1, 1864. The following day Lincoln renominated Hawkins and the Senate subsequently confirmed the appointment on April 18, 1864.

Hawkins was assigned to command a brigade of the United States Colored Troops (USCT) and the District of Northeastern Louisiana. In April 1864 he assumed command of the 1st Division of the USCT. He and his division distinguished themselves in the assault at the Battle of Fort Blakeley on April 9, 1865, which resulted in the capture of Mobile, Alabama. Hawkins was mustered out of the Union Army volunteer service on February 1, 1866.

In the wave of the mass promotions at the end of the war Hawkins was promoted to the brevet grade of major general in both the U.S. Volunteers and the regular army.

== Later life ==
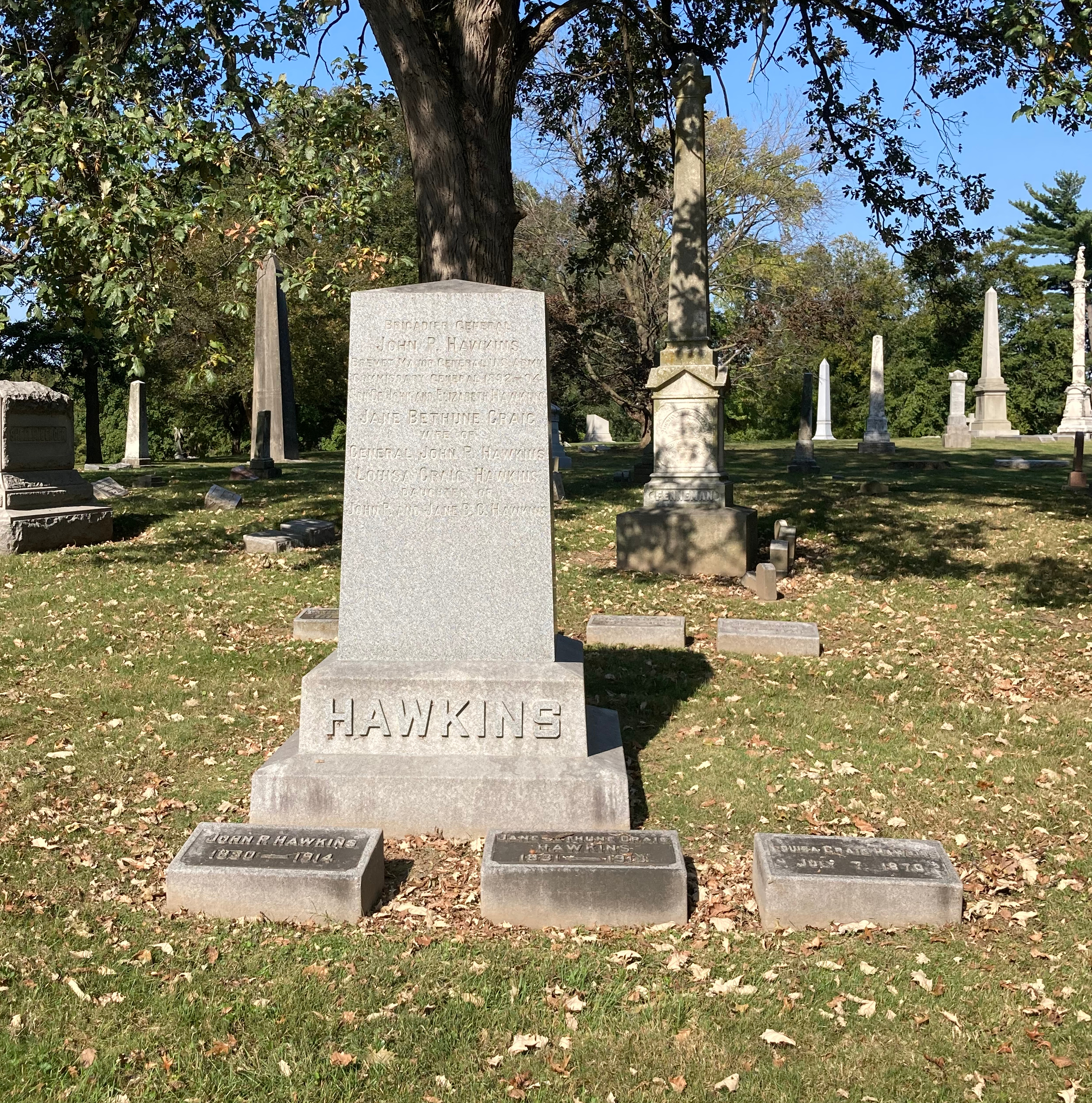
Hawkins' grave at Crown Hill Cemetery

Hawkins stayed in the army and reverted to his regular rank of captain in the Subsistence Department. He married Jane Bethune Craig, daughter of former Chief of Ordnance Colonel Henry Knox Craig, on October 10, 1867. He served in a number of postings and received a series of promotions: to major on June 23, 1874; to lieutenant colonel on September 3, 1889; and colonel on March 12, 1892. He was appointed Commissary General of Subsistence of the U.S. Army with the rank of brigadier general on December 2, 1892, and remained in this position till he resigned on September 29, 1894, aged 64. He died on February 7, 1914, in Indianapolis, Indiana, outlived by his daughter, and was buried at the local Crown Hill Cemetery. His wife had predeceased him on April 13, 1913.

== Released works ==
- Memoranda concerning some branches of the Hawkins family and connections (1913)

== See also ==
- List of American Civil War generals (Union)
