= Dorothea Dix =

American social reformer (1802–1887)

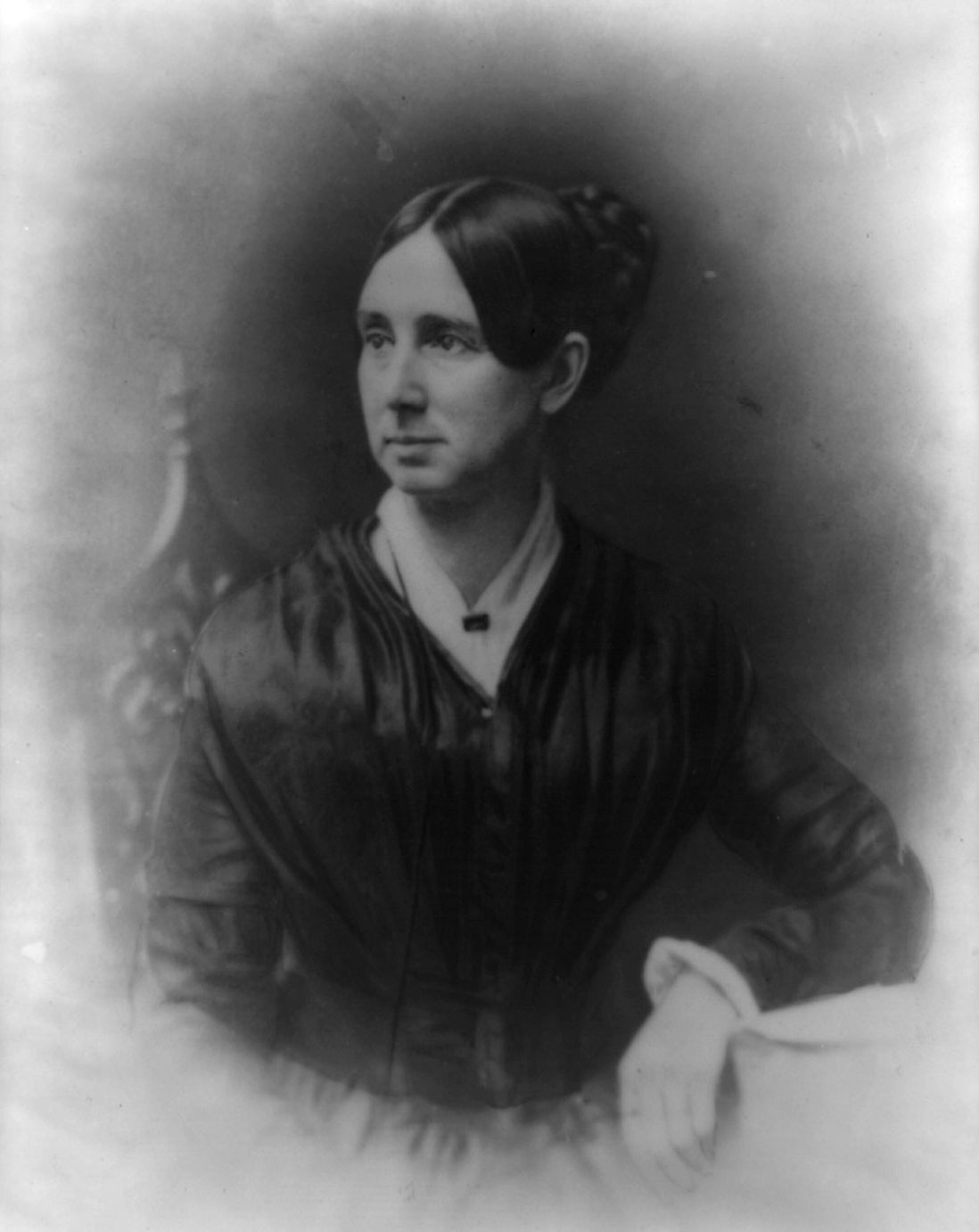
- Born: Dorothea Lynde Dix; April 4, 1802; Hampden, Massachusetts (District of Maine), US
- Died: July 17, 1887 (aged 85); Trenton, New Jersey, US
- Occupation: Social reformer
- Parent(s): Joseph Dix; Mary Bigelow

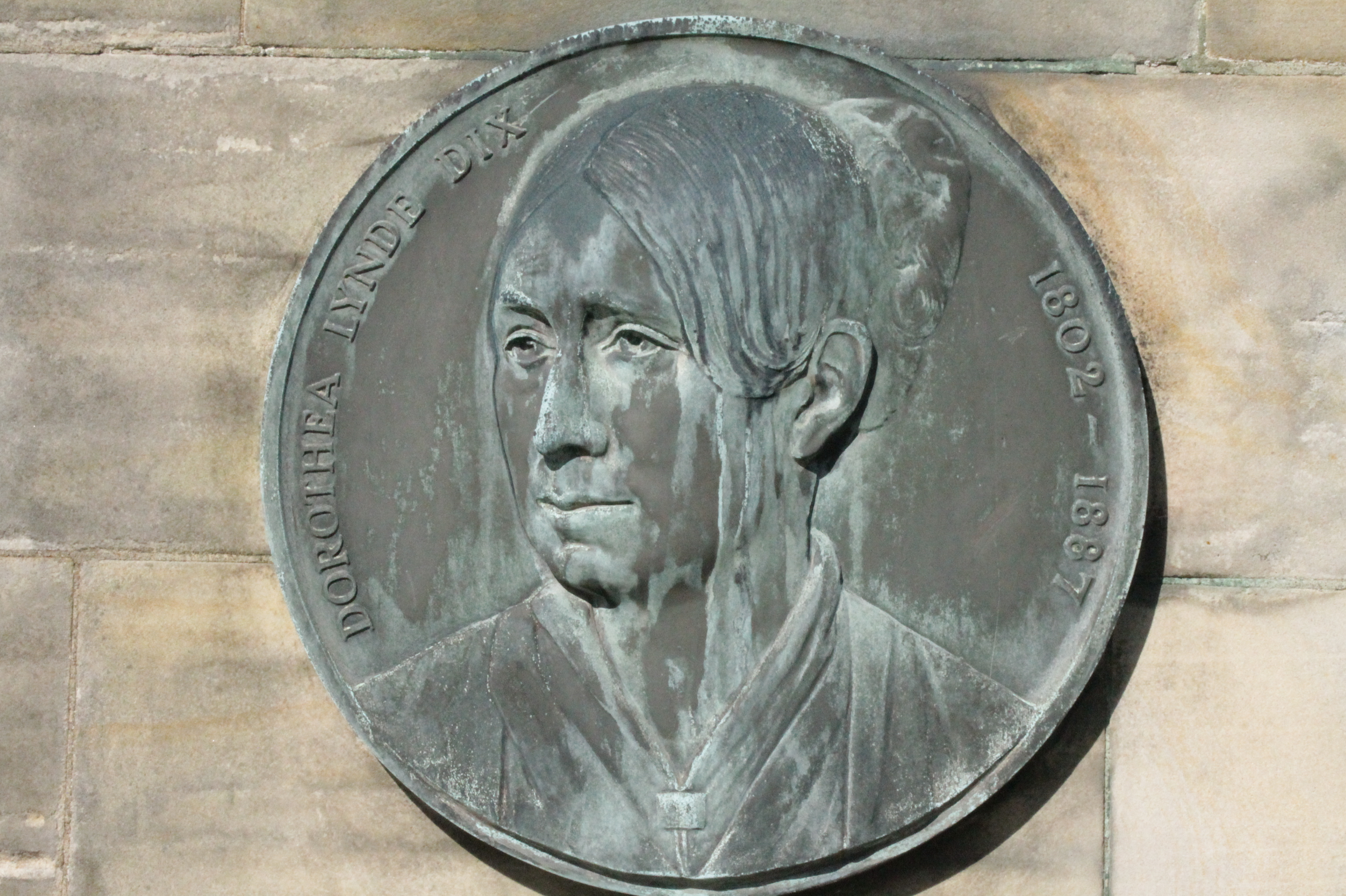
Plaque to Dorothea Dix, Royal Edinburgh Hospital

Dorothea Lynde Dix (April 4, 1802 – July 17, 1887) was an American advocate on behalf of the poor mentally ill. By her vigorous and sustained program of lobbying state legislatures and the United States Congress, she helped create the first generation of American mental asylums. During the Civil War, she served as a Superintendent of Army Nurses.

== Early life ==
Born in the town of Hampden in the District of Maine, she grew up in Worcester, Massachusetts, among her parents' relatives. She was the first child of three born to Joseph Dix and Mary Bigelow, who had deep ancestral roots in Massachusetts Bay Colony. Her mother suffered from poor health, and was thus not able to provide consistent support to her children. Her father was an itinerant bookseller and Methodist preacher. (Note: Internet Archive currently lists seven copies of Francis Tiffany's book, of varying replication quality. The book was reprinted a number of times, and publishers may vary. However, the text is identical. Unfortunately, two of the easier to read versions uploaded to Internet Archive, namely this and this (the two bottom listings), are missing the title page, so were not utilised for the citation in this article. The information provided in the Internet Archive listings should never be used for citation, as they can contain inaccuracies (as can Google book listings). The uploaded, visible text itself should always be relied upon.) At the age of twelve, she and her two brothers were sent to their wealthy grandmother, Dorothea Lynde (married to Dr. Elijah Dix) in Boston to get away from her alcoholic parents and abusive father. She began to teach in a school all for girls in Worcester, Massachusetts at fourteen years old and had developed her own curriculum for her class, in which she emphasized ethical living and the natural sciences. In about 1821 Dix opened a school in Boston, which was patronized by well-to-do families. Soon afterward she also began teaching poor and neglected children out of the barn of her grandmother's house, but she suffered poor health. It has been suggested that Dorothea suffered from major depressive episodes, which contributed to her poor health. From 1824 to 1830, she wrote mainly devotional books and stories for children. Her Conversations on Common Things (1824) reached its sixtieth edition by 1869, and was reprinted 60 times and written in the style of a conversation between mother and daughter. Her book The Garland of Flora (1829) was, along with Elizabeth Wirt's Flora's Dictionary, one of the first two dictionaries of flowers published in the United States. Other books of Dix's include Private Hours, Alice and Ruth, and Prisons and Prison Discipline.

Although raised Catholic and later directed to Congregationalism, Dix became a Unitarian. After Dix's health forced her to relinquish her school, she began working as a governess on Beacon Hill for the family of William Ellery Channing, a leading Unitarian intellectual. It was while working with his family that Dix traveled to St. Croix, where she witnessed slavery at first hand, though her experience did not dispose her sympathies toward abolitionism. In 1831, she established a model school for girls in Boston, operating it until 1836, when she suffered a breakdown. Dix was encouraged to take a trip to Europe to improve her health. While she was there she met British social reformers who inspired her. These reformers included Elizabeth Fry, Samuel Tuke and William Rathbone with whom she lived during the duration of her trip in Europe. In hopes of a cure, in 1836 she traveled to England, where she met the Rathbone family. During her trip in Europe and her stay with the Rathbone family, Dorothea's grandmother died and left her a "sizable estate, along with her royalties" which allowed her to live comfortably for the remainder of her life. It was also during this trip that she came across an institution in Turkey, which she used as a model institution despite its conditions being just like other facilities. The Rathbones were Quakers and prominent social reformers. They invited her as a guest to Greenbank, their ancestral mansion in Liverpool. At Greenbank, Dix met their circle of men and women who believed that government should play a direct, active role in social welfare. She was also introduced to Great Britain's reform movement for care of the mentally ill, known as lunacy reform. Its members were making deep investigations of madhouses and asylums, publishing their studies in reports to the House of Commons.

== Antebellum career ==
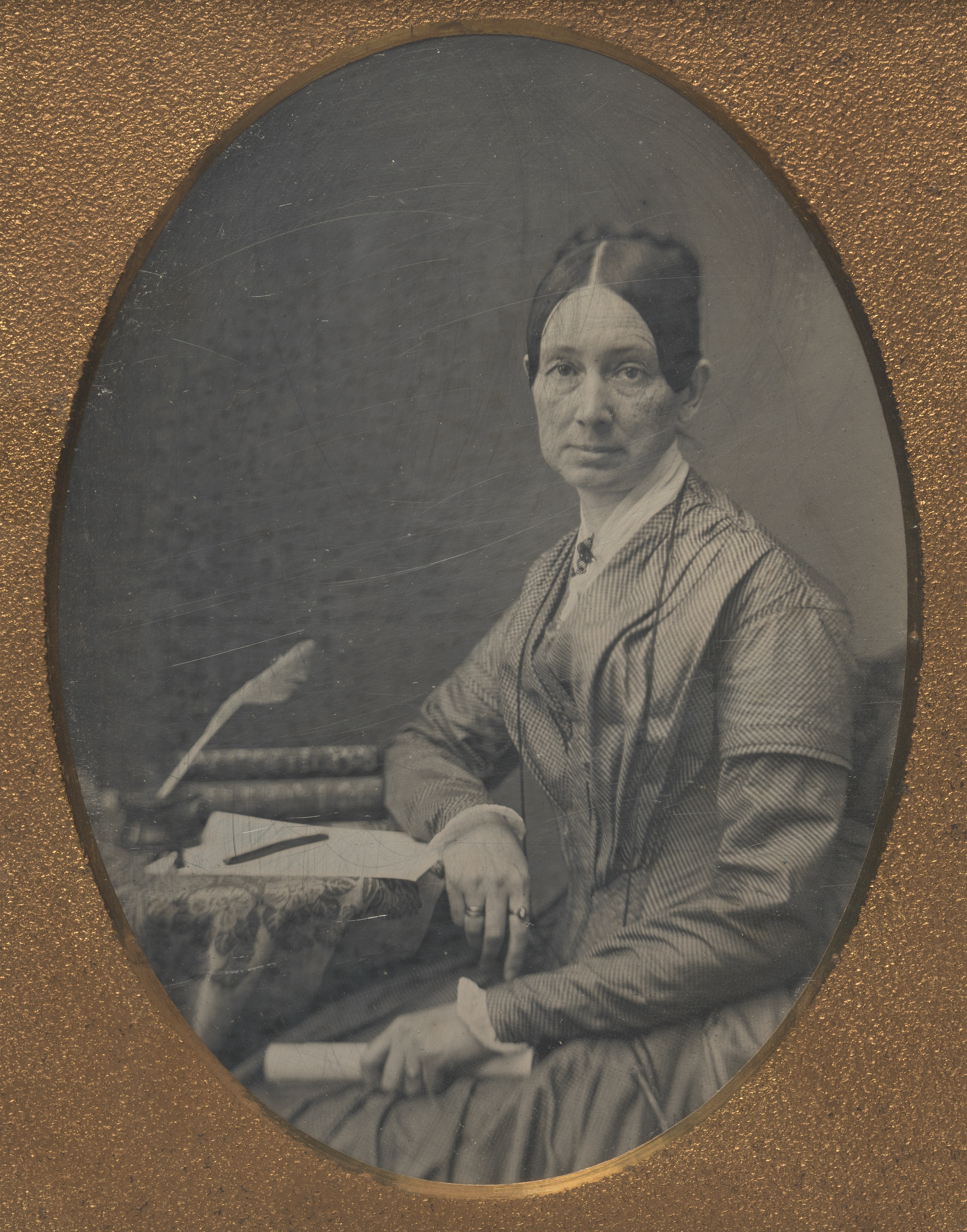
Half-plate daguerreotype of Dorothea Dix, c. 1849

Reform movements for treatment of the mentally ill were related in this period to other progressive causes: abolitionism, temperance, and voter reforms. After returning to America, in 1840–41 Dix conducted a statewide investigation of care for the mentally ill poor in Massachusetts. Dorothea's interest for helping out the mentally ill of society started while she was teaching classes to female prisoners in East Cambridge. She saw how these individuals were locked up and whose medical needs weren't being satisfied since only private hospitals would have such provisions. It was during her time at the East Cambridge prison, that she visited the basement where she encountered four mentally ill individuals, whose cells were "dark and bare and the air was stagnant and foul". She also saw how such individuals were labeled as "looney paupers" and were being locked up along with violently deranged criminals and received treatment that was inhumane.

In most cases, towns contracted with local individuals to care for mentally ill people who could not care for themselves and lacked family/friends to do so. Unregulated and underfunded, this system resulted in widespread abuse. Dix published the results in a fiery report, a Memorial, to the state legislature. "I proceed, Gentlemen, briefly to call your attention to the present state of Insane Persons confined within this Commonwealth, in cages, stalls, pens! Chained, naked, beaten with rods, and lashed into obedience." Her lobbying resulted in a bill to expand the state's mental hospital in Worcester.

During the year 1844 Dix visited all the counties, jails and almshouses in New Jersey in a similar investigation. She prepared a memorial for the New Jersey Legislature, giving a detailed account of her observations and facts. Dix urgently appealed to the legislature to act and appropriate funds to construct a facility for the care and treatment of the mentally ill. She cited a number of cases to emphasize the importance of the state taking responsibility for this class of unfortunates. Dix's plea was to provide moral treatment for the mentally ill, which consisted of three values: modesty, chastity, and delicacy.

She gave as an example a man formerly respected as a legislator and jurist, who, suffering from mental decline, fell into hard times in old age. Dix discovered him lying on a small bed in a basement room of the county almshouse, bereft of even necessary comforts. She wrote: "This feeble and depressed old man, a pauper, helpless, lonely, and yet conscious of surrounding circumstances, and not now wholly oblivious of the past—this feeble old man, who was he?" Many members of the legislature knew her pauper jurist. Joseph S. Dodd introduced her report to the Senate on January 23, 1845.

Dodd's resolution to authorize an asylum passed the following day. The first committee made their report February 25, appealing to the New Jersey legislature to act at once. Some politicians secretly opposed it due to taxes needed to support it. Dix continued to lobby for a facility, writing letters and editorials to build support. During the session, she met with legislators and held group meetings in the evening at home. The act of authorization was taken up March 14, 1845, and read for the last time. On March 25, 1845, the bill was passed for the establishment of a state facility.

Dix traveled from New Hampshire to Louisiana, documenting the condition of the poor mentally ill, making reports to state legislatures, and working with committees to draft the enabling legislation and appropriations bills needed. In 1846, Dix traveled to Illinois to study mental illness. While there, she fell ill and spent the winter in Springfield recovering. She submitted a report to the January 1847 legislative session, which adopted legislation to establish Illinois' first state mental hospital. In three years in the mid 1840s she traveled more than 10,000 miles by stagecoach, visiting over 500 almshouses, 300 county jails, 18 state penitentiaries, and an indeterminate number of hospitals.

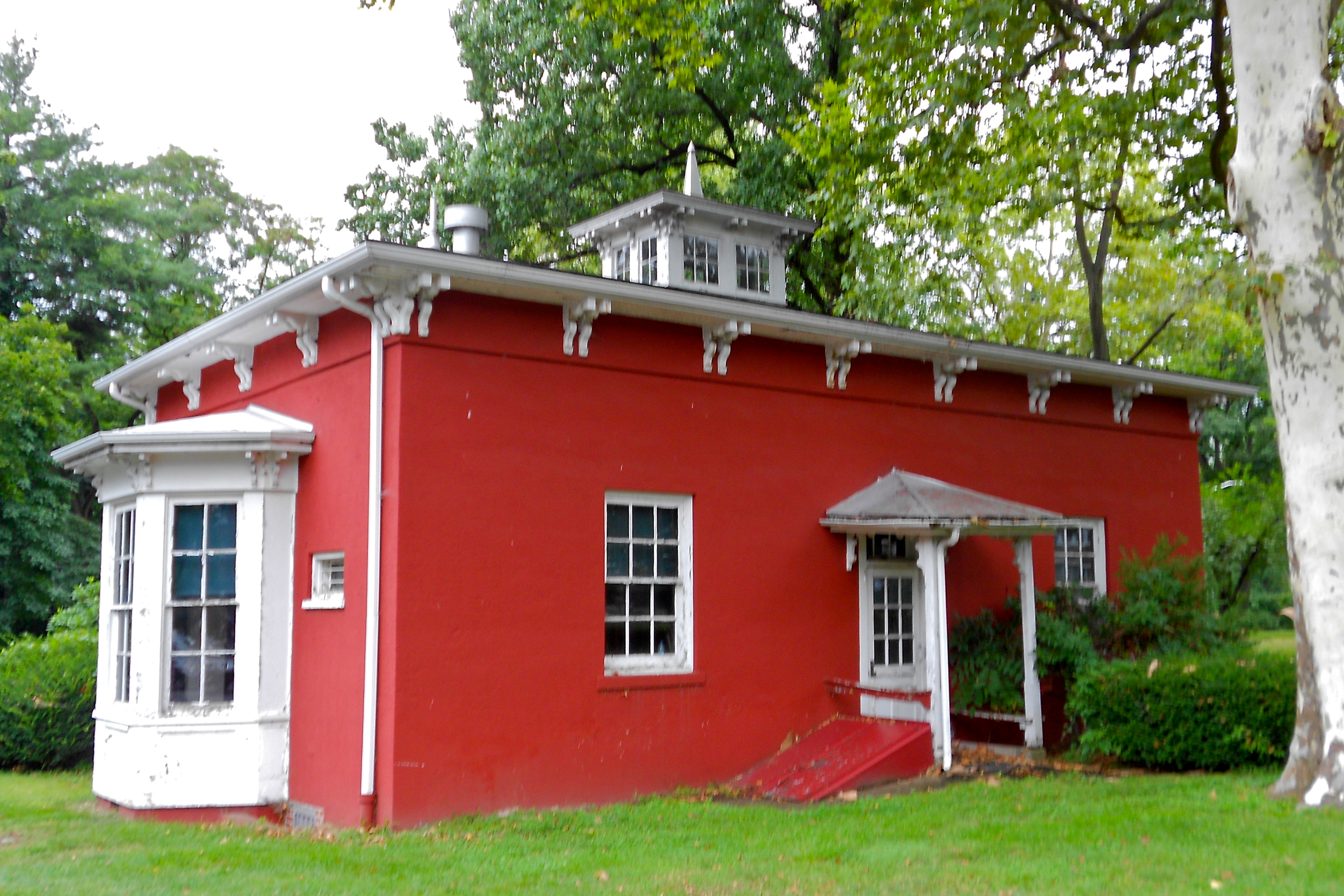
The Dorothea Dix Museum on the grounds of the Harrisburg State Hospital

In 1848, Dix visited North Carolina, where she again called for reform in the care of mentally ill patients. Her first attempt to bring reform to North Carolina was denied. However, after a board member's wife requested, as a dying wish, that Dix's plea be reconsidered, the bill for reform was approved. In 1849, when the (North Carolina) State Medical Society was formed, the legislature authorized construction of an institution in the capital, Raleigh, for the care of mentally ill patients. Dix Hill Asylum, named in honor of Dorothea Dix's father, was eventually opened in 1856. One hundred years later, the Dix Hill Asylum was renamed the Dorothea Dix Hospital, in honor of her legacy. A second state hospital for the mentally ill was authorized in 1875, Broughton State Hospital in Morganton, North Carolina; and ultimately, the Goldsboro Hospital for the Negro Insane was also built in eastern part of the state. Dix had a biased view that mental illness was related to conditions of educated whites, not minorities (Dix, 1847).

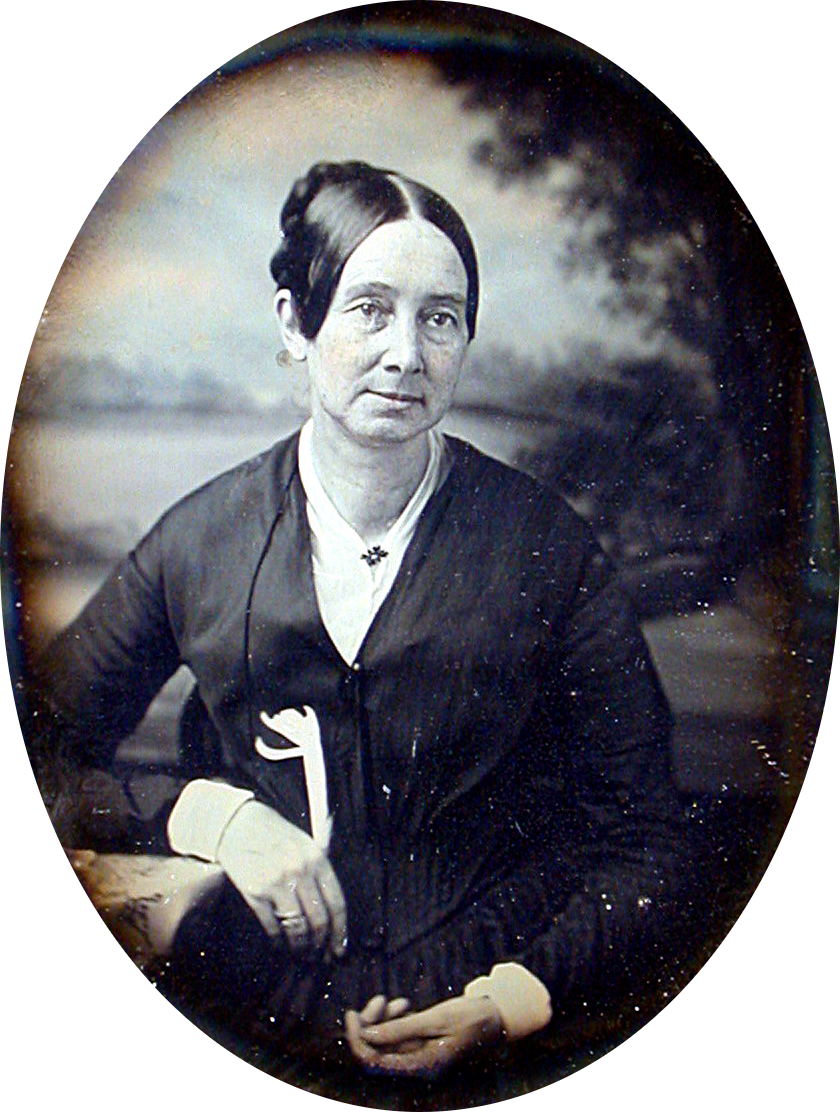
Dix c. 1850–55

She was instrumental in the founding of the first public mental hospital in Pennsylvania, the Harrisburg State Hospital. In 1853, she established its library and reading room.

The high point of her work in Washington was the Bill for the Benefit of the Indigent Insane, legislation to set aside 12,225,000 acres (49,473 km^{2}) of Federal land 10,000,000 acres (40,000 km^{2}) to be used for the benefit of the mentally ill and the remainder for the "blind, deaf, and dumb". Proceeds from its sale would be distributed to the states to build and maintain asylums. Dix's land bill passed both houses of the United States Congress; but in 1854, President Franklin Pierce vetoed it, arguing that social welfare was the responsibility of the states. Stung by the defeat of her land bill, in 1854 and 1855 Dix traveled to England and Europe. She reconnected with the Rathbone family and, encouraged by British politicians who wished to increase Whitehall's reach into Scotland, conducted investigations of Scotland's madhouses. This work resulted in the formation of the Scottish Lunacy Commission to oversee reforms.

Dix visited the British colony of Nova Scotia in 1853 to study its care of the mentally ill. During her visit, she traveled to Sable Island to investigate reports of mentally ill patients being abandoned there. Such reports were largely unfounded. While on Sable Island, Dix assisted in a shipwreck rescue. Upon her return to Boston, she led a successful campaign to send upgraded life-saving equipment to the island. The day after supplies arrived, a ship was wrecked on the island. Thankfully, because of Dix's work, 180 people were saved.

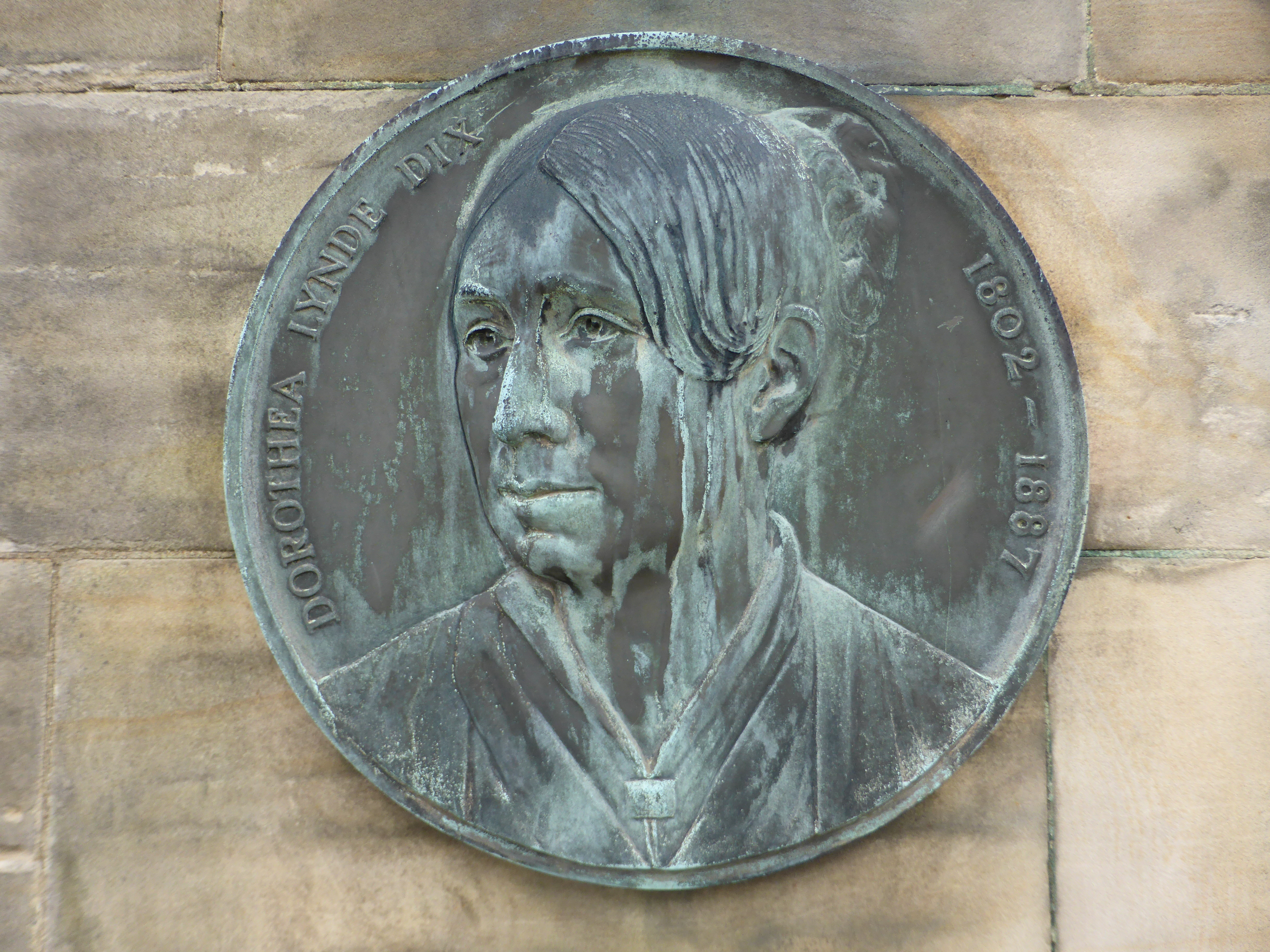
Plaque to Dorothea Lynde Dix at the Royal Edinburgh Hospital

In 1854, Dix investigated the conditions of mental hospitals in Scotland, and found them to be in similarly poor conditions. In 1857, after years of work and opposition, reform laws were finally passed. Dix took up a similar project in the Channel Islands, finally managing the building of an asylum after thirteen years of agitation. Extending her work throughout Europe, Dix continued on to Rome. Once again finding disrepair and maltreatment, Dix sought an audience with Pope Pius IX. The pope was receptive to Dix's findings and visited the asylums himself, shocked at their conditions. He thanked Dix for her work, saying in a second audience with her that "a woman and a Protestant, had crossed the seas to call his attention to these cruelly ill-treated members of his flock." Dix ultimately founded thirty-two hospitals, and influenced the creation of two others in Japan.

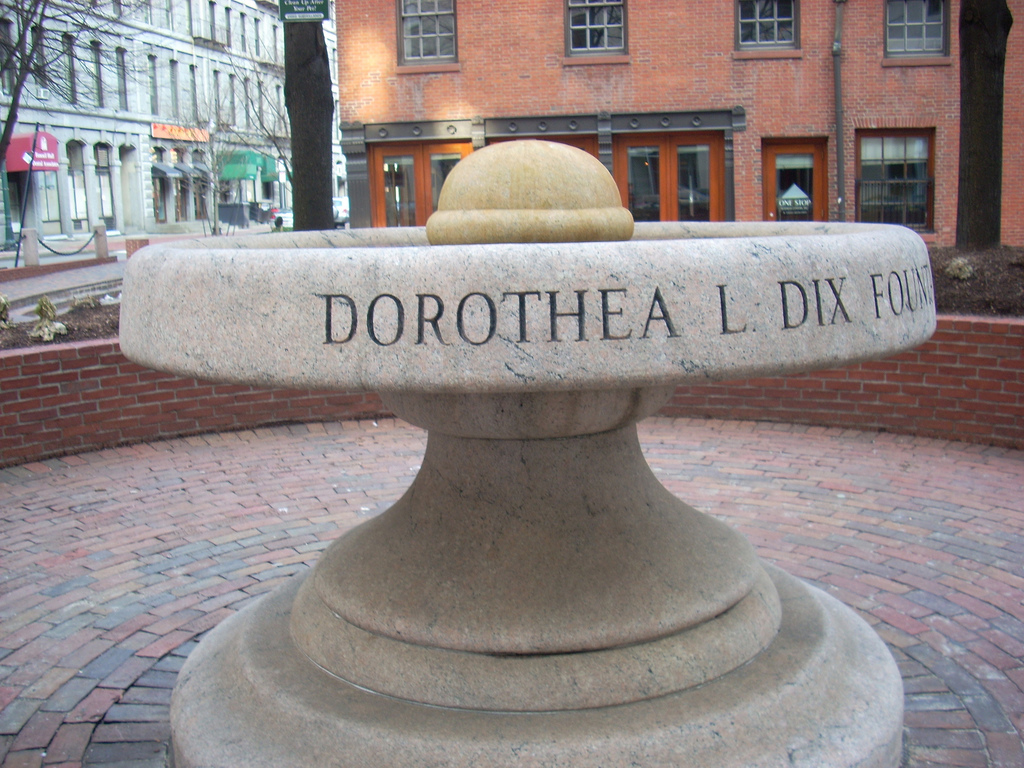
Fountain for thirsty horses Dix gave to the city of Boston to honor the MSPCA

== The Civil War ==
On June 16, 1861, as the Civil War turned bloody, Dix was appointed Superintendent of Army Nurses for the Union Army, by Secretary of War, Simon Cameron. He was a politician who had long admired her advocacy work. Dix, who was not a nurse herself, set stiff guidelines for nurse candidates. Volunteers were to be aged 35 to 50 and plain-looking. They must wear plain uniforms with no jewelry or cosmetics. In all, she signed up about 3,000 women. She feuded with doctors who insisted that they should set hospital policy; many opposed having any nurses. In 1863 the Army gave doctors full control over hospital employees and volunteers and Dix lost all of her remaining power. Dix was eclipsed by other prominent women such as Dr. Mary Edwards Walker and Clara Barton. She resigned in August 1865 and considered her war work a failure.

Over 600 Catholic sisters successfully served as Union Army nurses. Dix distrusted them; her deep anti-Catholicism undermined her ability to work with Catholic nurses, lay or religious.

Dix herself rarely worked directly with wounded soldiers. Her policy was that Confederate and Union wounded should be treated alike. Before the war, she travelled widely in the South, was well received and helped start new asylums. She had a favorable impression of the South and worked hard in the 1850s to reverse the growing North-South divisions. However during the war she developed an intense hatred of the Confederacy and denounced its civilian supporters saying they had been, "transformed to demons". In 1864 she wrote a friend, "God forgive those savage wretches in the South: I cannot."

Her main supporter was Secretary of War, Simon Cameron, but he left office in early 1862. Dix made many enemies, especially two new large scale organizations, the Woman's Central Association of Relief and the Sanitary Commission. They succeeded in sharply reducing her power and tarnishing her reputation as an organizer. Her reputation as a humanitarian survived thanks to her putting aside her previous work to focus completely on the war at hand.

With the conclusion of the war, her service was recognized formally. She was awarded with two national flags, these flags being for "the Care, Succor, and Relief of the Sick and wounded Soldiers of the United States on the Battle-Field, in Camps and Hospitals during the recent war."

== Postwar life ==
At the end of the war, Dix helped raise funds for the national monument to deceased soldiers at Fortress Monroe. Following the war, she resumed her crusade to improve the care of prisoners, the disabled, and the mentally ill. Her first step was to review the asylums and prisons in the South to evaluate the war damage to their facilities. In addition to pursuing prisons reforms after the civil war, she also worked on improving life-saving services in Nova Scotia, establishing a war memorial at Hampton Roads in Virginia and a fountain for thirsty horses at the Boston Custom Square.

In 1881, Dix moved into the New Jersey State Hospital, formerly known as Trenton State Hospital, that she built years prior. The state legislature had designated a suite for her private use as long as she lived. Although in poor health, she carried on correspondence with people from England, Japan, and elsewhere. Dix died on July 17, 1887. She was buried in Mount Auburn Cemetery in Cambridge, Massachusetts.

== Honors ==
- Dix was elected "President for Life" of the Army Nurses Association (a social club for Civil War Volunteer Nurses), but she had little to do with the organization. She opposed its efforts to get military pensions for its members.
- In December 1866, she was awarded two national flags for her service during the Civil War. This award was awarded for "the Care, Succor, and Relief of the Sick and wounded Soldiers of the United States on the Battle-Field, in Camps and Hospitals during the recent War."
- In 1979, she was inducted into the National Women's Hall of Fame.
- In 1983, the United States Postal Service honored her life of charity and service by issuing a 1¢ Dorothea Dix Great Americans series postage stamp.
- In 1999, a series of six tall marble panels with a bronze bust in each was added to the Massachusetts State House; the busts are of Dix, Florence Luscomb, Mary Kenney O'Sullivan, Josephine St. Pierre Ruffin, Sarah Parker Remond, and Lucy Stone. As well, two quotations from each of those women (including Dix) are etched on their own marble panel, and the wall behind all the panels has wallpaper made of six government documents repeated over and over, with each document being related to a cause of one or more of the women.
- A United States Navy transport ship serving in World War II was named for Dix, the USS Dorothea L. Dix.
- The Bangor Mental Health Institute was renamed in August 2006 to the Dorothea Dix Psychiatric Center.
- A crater on Venus was named Dix in her honor.
- She is remembered on the Boston Women's Heritage Trail.

Numerous locations commemorate Dix, including the Dix Ward in McLean Asylum at Somerville, Dixmont Hospital in Pennsylvania, the Dorothea L. Dix House, and the Dorothea Dix Park in Raleigh, North Carolina.

== Works ==
- The Garland of Flora, Boston: S.G. Goodrich & Co., and Carter & Hendee, 1829. Published anonymously.
- Remarks on Prisons and Prison Discipline in the United States, 2nd edition, from the 1st Boston edition, Philadelphia: Joseph Kite & Co, 1845
- Memorial of Miss D. L. Dix in Relation to the Illinois Penitentiary, February 1847
- Memorial of Miss D. L. Dix to the Hon. The General Assembly in Behalf of the Insane of Maryland, House of Delegates?, March 5, 1852

She wrote a variety of other tracts on prisoners. She is also the author of many memorials to legislative bodies on the subject of lunatic asylums and reports on philanthropic subjects.

=== For young readers ===
- Conversations on Common Things, or, Guide to Knowledge, with Questions (3rd ed.), Boston: Monroe & Francis, 1828 [1824]

- "Conversations on common things". Munroe and Francis – via Internet Archive.
- Note: other replications of this book are also available via Google Books.

- Alice and Ruth
- Evening Hours

and other books.

== See also ==
- Kirkbride Plan
- Dorothea Dix Hospital
- Other nurses of the American Civil War
  - Louisa May Alcott
  - Addie L. Ballou
  - Mary Ann Bickerdyke
  - Louisa Hawkins Canby
  - Lois Dunbar
  - Helen L. Gilson
  - Mary Phinney von Olnhausen
- Virginia Gonzalez Torres – also referred to as the Dorothea Dix of Mexico
