= Dorothea Dix Psychiatric Center =

- Bangor Mental Health Institute
- U.S. National Register of Historic Places
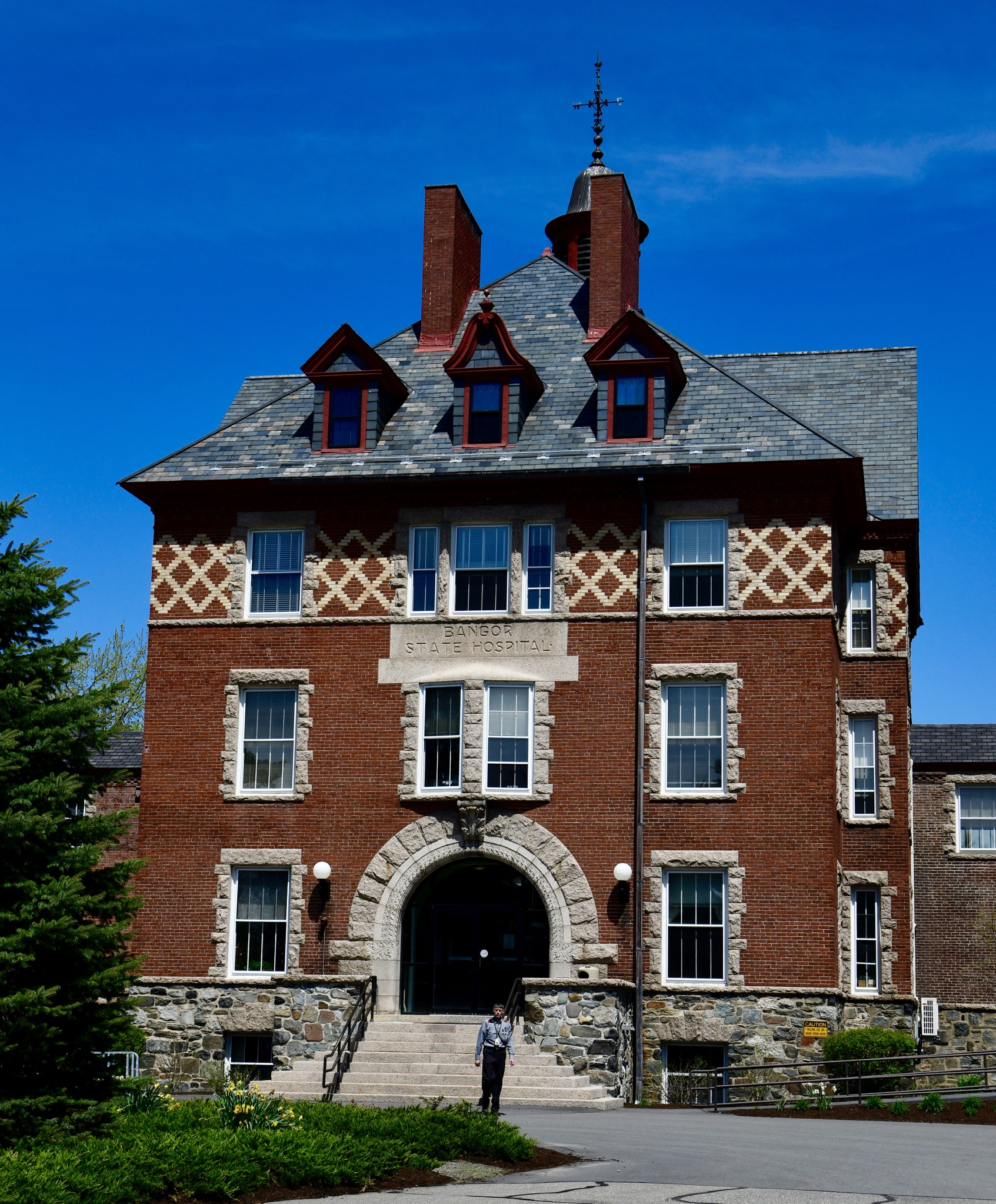

- Location within Maine Location within the United States
- Location: 656 State St. Bangor, Maine
- Coordinates: 44°49′3.5″N 68°44′30″W
- Area: 15 acres (6.1 ha)
- Built: 1896
- Architect: John Calvin Stevens
- NRHP reference No.: 87000420
- Added to NRHP: July 16, 1987

The Dorothea Dix Psychiatric Center is a psychiatric hospital operated by the state of Maine. It is located at 656 State Street in Bangor, and was previously known as the Eastern Maine Insane Asylum and the Bangor Mental Health Institute. It was established in 1895, and the main building on its campus is listed on the National Register of Historic Places.

== Services and coverage area ==
The Dorothea Dix Psychiatric Center provides inpatient and outpatient care for the most severely mentally ill individuals in the eastern two-thirds of the state. It has 51 beds and serves both voluntary and involuntary (court-committed) patients. Its operations are governed by state legislation and overseen by the state's Department of Health and Human Services.

== History ==
Maine's first psychiatric hospital was the Maine Insane Hospital, established in Augusta in 1835. The facility was repeatedly expanded until 1889, when further enlargement was deemed unfeasible. The state then appointed a committee to identify a site for a second facility, which led to the selection of the current location. The centerpiece of the campus is a sprawling, connected multi-building complex, at whose center is the hospital's first building, designed by the noted Portland architect John Calvin Stevens and completed in 1897. The wings, which were designed by Bangor architect George Coombs, were added in 1899–1901, when the facility formally opened its doors. The hospital continued to grow over the course of the 20th century, generally according to the principles of the Kirkbride Plan for the design and organization of mental hospitals. The main building was listed on the National Register of Historic Places in 1987; it is one of the state's largest public buildings.

When it was founded, the facility was called the Eastern Maine Insane Hospital. In 1913, the name was changed to Bangor State Hospital, and later to Bangor Mental Health Institute. In 2005 it was renamed the Dorothea Dix Psychiatric Center, in honor of Dorothea Dix, a pioneering 19th-century advocate for the improved treatment of the mentally ill.

== Campus ==
The center's campus is located on Bangor's east side, between State Street (United States Route 2) and Mount Hope Avenue, with Saxl Park on its west side. In addition to the sprawling main building, the campus includes the Tuberculosis Center, Hedin Hall, the Pre-Release Center, a maintenance building, and Pooler Pavilion.

== See also ==
- National Register of Historic Places listings in Penobscot County, Maine
