= Lois Dunbar =

American nurse (fl. 1861–1864)

Lois H. Dunbar
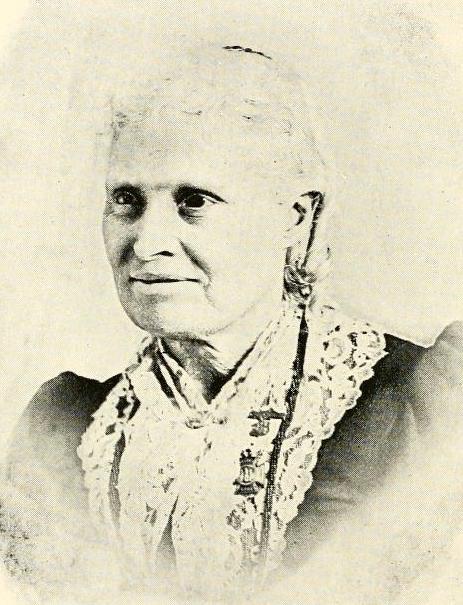
- Dunbar, from an 1897 publication
- Born: Lois Dennett
- Occupation: Civil War nurse

Lois Dunbar née Dennett (fl. 1861–1864) was a Union nurse during the American Civil War. "My war record is one of hard labor and severe trials," wrote Dunbar in a letter to Mary G. Holland.

Dunbar's extensive service began in St. Louis, Missouri, on November 10, 1861. In St. Louis, Dunbar worked for Dr. Hodges, a head surgeon at the city's hospital. Working with Dr. Hodges, Dunbar cared for three hundred patients at a time as they were coming in from battle at Fort Donelson. In April 1862, Governor Morton requested Dunbar's service in Evansville, Illinois, as there were no nurses on duty. At this new location, Dunbar served with Dr. DeBruler, another head surgeon. At this new appointment, Dunbar was placed in full charge, acting as a commanding officer and a nurse in addition to have five other hospitals to monitor, according to her aforementioned letter. In September 1862, Dunbar received a commission from Dorothea Dix to serve as a hospital inspector, but the head surgeon DeBruler objected as he needed Dunbar's service as a nurse. Dunbar agreed, thinking her time better spent as a nurse than an inspector.

During her service, Dunbar experienced many tragic and dangerous situations. While she was serving on a hospital transport ship, for example, the ship came under fire. Dunbar worked to transform a church into a hospital to accommodate the growing number of casualties. Serving at Young's Point during the Battle of Vicksburg, Dunbar's feet became badly blistered and she was thoroughly exhausted, ultimately fainting in her room. She still managed to get back to service after resting. Dunbar knew how to perform minor surgery well; she was taught by Dr. Jameson who acted as a surgeon during the Crimean War. Because of this knowledge, she assisted in many amputations. She might have even used this knowledge to treat a patient who would become her husband George A. Dunbar, a corporal the 3rd Iowa Infantry, a man who Dunbar saved after five doctors had lost hope of his survival. Dunbar writes in her letter that she would often carry delicacies in her pocket for the patients she cared for, though she also saw many dark moments during her work. For instance, one man died in Dunbar's arms, clutching her dress.

Dunbar left the service of her last wartime hospital in 1864.

In a personal account after the war's end, she listed her address as: 908 22d Street, Ogden, Utah. A pension file was found for Dunbar in the Adjutant General's office in Evansville, Illinois.
