= Virginia González Torres =

Virginia González Torres (Note: In this Mexican name, the surname is González and the second or maternal family name is Torres.) is a human rights activist in Mexico who provides support and resources for the mentally ill. She is often referred to as the Dorothea Dix of Mexico.

Born into a wealthy family that owned a pharmacy chain, (Note: Sister to Víctor and Jorge.) González began a volunteer women's program at Sayago hospital in the 1980s. In her investigative role, she has sneaked into most of the public mental institutions in Mexico, sometimes posing as a patient, and she once smuggled the mayor of Mexico City into a men's mental hospital to view the conditions there. More than once she has been beaten up at institutions when she was discovered inside hiding in the dark.

In 1992 González helped make men's mental hospital Ramirez Moreno infamous by filming conditions inside. In 1995, she helped draft a new mental health law.

== See also ==
- Mental Disability Rights International
