= Helen L. Gilson =

American nurse

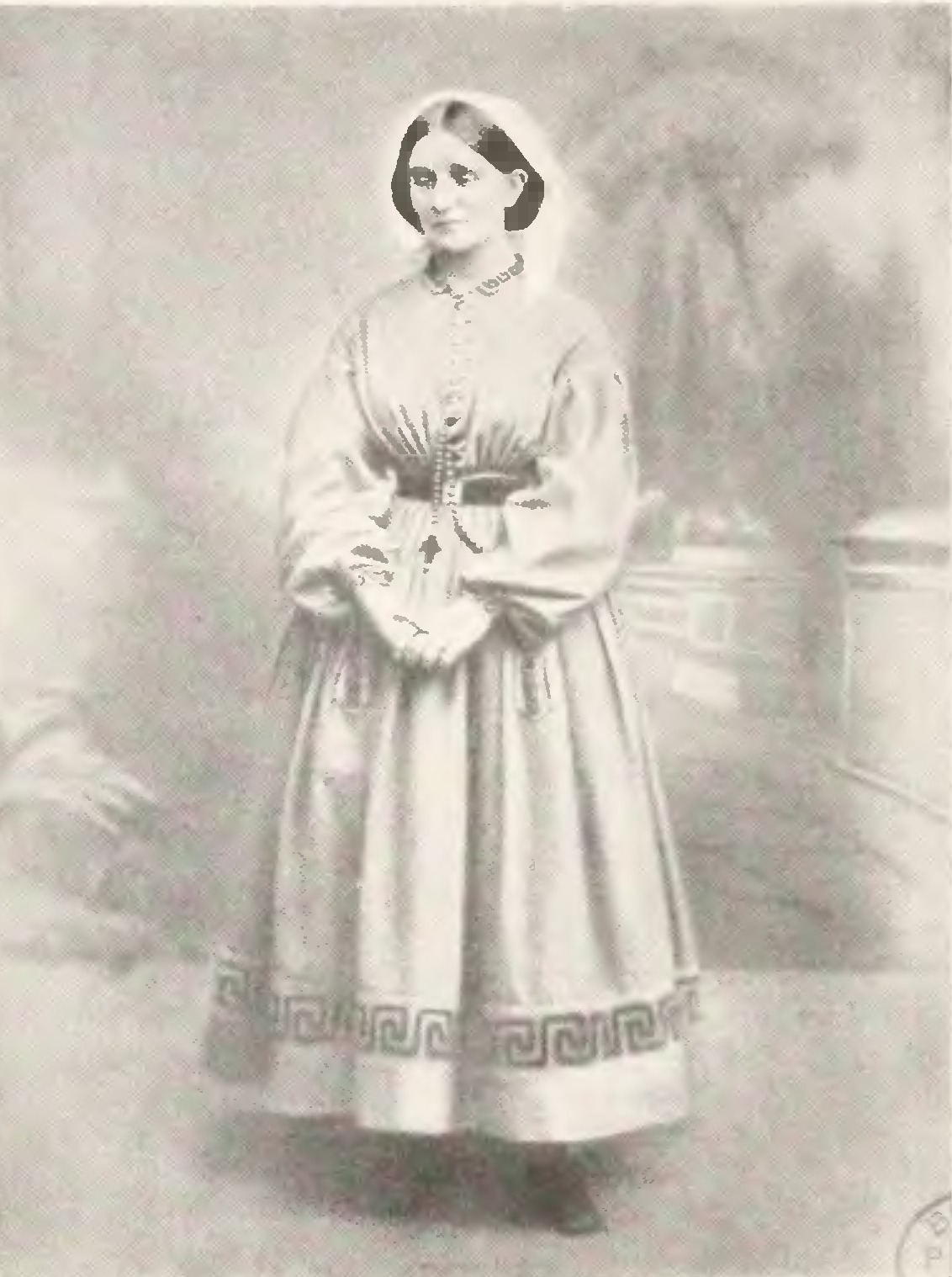
- Born: Helen L. Gilson Osgood; 1836
- Died: 1868 (aged 31–32)

Helen L. Gilson (later, Helen L. Osgood; 1836–1868) was born in Chelsea, Massachusetts. She was a nurse during the Civil War. Also known as Helen L. Gilson Osgood.

== Early life ==
Helen Louise Gilson was born in 1836. She began her career in teaching at seventeen as the head assistant of Phillips School in Boston, Massachusetts. She stayed there for a few years until 1858 when throat problems forced her to leave. After that, she moved back to Chelsea, Massachusetts where she worked as a governess for her cousins, children of her uncle Frank B. Fay, the mayor of Chelsea.

== Participation in the Civil War effort ==
Fay took a deep interest in supporting the Civil War, especially in supporting the troops. This was a cause that Gilson became passionate about as well. Gibson's service began in 1861 by organizing with the Soldiers' Aid Society. Her duties included preparing, collecting, and transporting supplies.

Hoping to help more, Gilson applied for a diploma to Dorothea Dix, the government superintendent of female nurses. She was denied due to age requirements. However, this did not stop her from leaving home to help the soldiers. Before 1862, Gilson worked with the Sanitary Commission alongside Fay and the Army of the Potomac. She worked alongside this army through most of their major battles. Gilson's best work during this period was on General Grant's campaign from Rapidan to Petersburg and the Appomattox which lasted almost a year. In April 1862, Gilson applied a second time to Dix, though this time in person. Dix offered her a placement at Washington's Columbian College Hospital. Though the particular job fell through, Gilson volunteered at the hospital anyway. In June 1862, Gilson began working on boats for the Hospital Transport System, a specialized division of the Special Relief Corp to provide medical supplies to hospitals.

When Fay, in his own relief efforts, realized the need for more help at Fort Monroe, he volunteered Gilson. This became her way into the army as a nurse. In order to prepare, Gilson attended lectures in Washington on medical techniques.

Gilson was present at numerous famous battles, such as Yorktown, Antietam, Gettysburg, Fredericksburg, and Chancellorsville. Gilson is most known for the work she did in changing the colored hospital in Petersburg, Virginia where the conditions were so terrible, it did not resemble a hospital at all. She advocated for renovations, and when they were approved she aided in the renovations and restructuring of the hospital so well that at one point 900 men were being served from kitchen.

Gilson was known to many as an "angel of mercy" for her work with the soldiers, both white and African American. She was known to spend time at the soldiers' bedsides talking and singing to them, comforting them even as they were close to death. She earned the respect and love of the men for who she cared.

== After the war ==
She left Richmond in July 1865, spent the summer on Long Island to recover from the illnesses she encountered while nursing the sick soldiers, and was home in Chelsea by fall. On October 11, 1866, Gilson married E. Hamilton Osgood in her hometown of Chelsea. Less than two years later on April 20, 1868, she, and her child, died during childbirth at Newton Corner Hospital.
