= Louisa Hawkins Canby =

American nurse who helped and sheltered Confederate soldiers

- Born: Louisa Hawkins; December 25, 1818; Paris, Kentucky, US
- Died: June 27, 1889 (aged 70); Mississippi River
- Resting place: Crown Hill Cemetery and Arboretum, Section 9, Lot 1; 39.8169916°N 86.1724421°W
- Education: Georgetown Female College
- Spouse: Edward Richard Sprigg Canby
- Relatives: John Parker Hawkins (brother)

Louisa Hawkins Canby (December 25, 1818 – June 27, 1889), also known as the "Angel of Santa Fe", was a nurse during the American Civil War, and wife of Union soldier Brigadier General Edward Richard Sprigg Canby. Canby was a nurse for Confederate soldiers in Santa Fe, New Mexico. Before General Edward Canby ordered his troops to retreat from Santa Fe, he instructed them to destroy or hide all essential supplies such as food, equipment, and blankets to hinder the Confederate soldiers. She subsequently assisted Confederate Col. William Read Scurry in locating the hidden supplies left behind by the retreating Union forces.

== Early life and education ==
Louisa Hawkins was born on December 25, 1818, in Paris, Kentucky. Like Edward Canby's family, the Hawkins family moved from Kentucky to Indiana. After graduating from Georgetown Female College in Georgetown, Kentucky, Louisa married Edward in Crawfordsville, Indiana on August 1, 1839. In 1843, they had a child, Mary, who died in childhood. Louisa's younger brother, John Parker Hawkins, was a West Point graduate who served during the Civil War, eventually retiring as a brigadier general in 1894. At least two of Louisa's three sisters were also married to military officers.

== Adult life ==
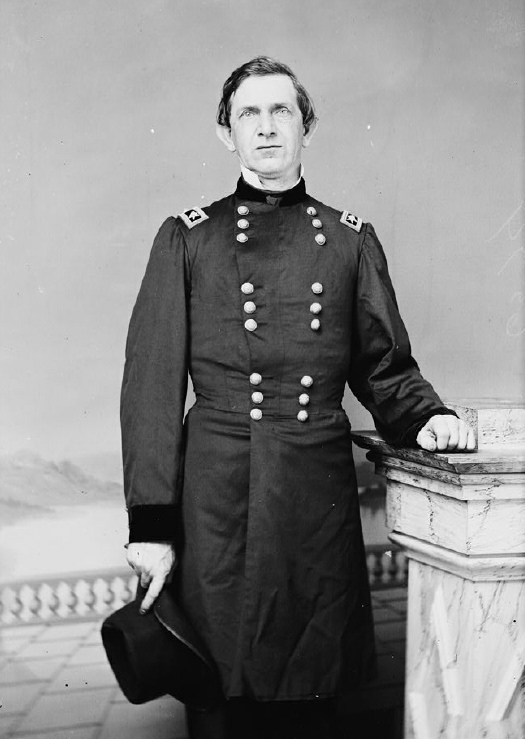
Edward Canby, ca. 1860—1865

In his memoirs, William Tecumseh Sherman recalls Louisa, Edward, and their daughter Mary's arrival in Monterey, California in early 1849. While in Monterey, which was then California's military headquarters, Edward succeeded Sherman as adjutant general of the California National Guard. There, Louisa met Lt. Col. Henry Stanton Burton, a Protestant who became involved in controversy when he proposed marriage to Maria Amparo Ruiz, a Roman Catholic and the granddaughter of the former Mexican governor of Baja California. The Roman Catholic Bishop of California condemned the union and the governor declared that "all the authorities of California are not to authorize any marriage when either of the parties is a Catholic." Louisa offered the couple the use of her home, where their marriage took place on July 7, 1849. Edward, who had begun a tour of northern California on July 2 and did not return to Monterey until August 9, was forced to explain that he had taken no part in the affair and that his wife, a civilian, had acted alone.

During the two years the Canby family were in the territory, California was admitted as the 31st state. Both Louisa and Edward contributed to this effort unofficially, Louisa by copying documents for the statehood convention and Edward by arranging and partially indexing territorial records.

In 1859, while Edward was commander of Fort Bridger, Utah Territory, the Canby family spent Christmas with Captain Henry Hopkins Sibley, who had graduated from West Point a year ahead of Edward Canby. It is not certain whether Louisa had met Sibley previously, though it was rumored that Louisa was Sibley's sister. Edward Canby and Sibley had crossed paths previously; Edward served on a court-martial panel that exonerated Sibley in 1858 and he subsequently endorsed Sibley's invention, the Sibley tent, which would be widely used during the Civil War. It was also rumored that Edward had been the best man at Sibley's wedding in 1840.

== Civil War ==
In January 1862, Henry Hopkins Sibley, who had recently been promoted to brigadier general, led a Confederate brigade into New Mexico Territory and began marching up the Rio Grande toward Colorado. Col. Canby was in charge of the defense of the entire territory, which included what is today the states of Arizona and New Mexico, as well as the southern tip of Nevada and parts of modern-day Colorado. He took command of Fort Craig, which, at that point, was the southernmost fort in the Confederates' line of march that had not yet been captured. While her husband fought Sibley in the Battle of Valverde, Louisa awaited the outcome of the campaign at Santa Fe, the territorial capital. On March 2, the Confederates captured Albuquerque and took Santa Fe eight days later. The federal army and territorial government had evacuated the capital, burning or hiding any supplies they were unable to carry with them to Fort Union, northeast of Santa Fe.

Louisa, along with the wives and families of other Union officers, chose to remain in Santa Fe. They soon had misgivings due to the evacuation of territorial authorities, the growing presence of looters, and other criminal activity. The Confederate soldiers who entered Santa Fe on March 10, 1862, were welcomed by the wives of Union officers, led by the wife of Colonel Edward Canby. The Confederates subsequently established martial law and conducted a mostly fruitless search for hidden supplies. On March 29, 1862, Confederate forces returned to Santa Fe after a victory at Glorieta Pass. On their way to attack Fort Union, the Confederates met a force made up predominantly of inexperienced Colorado volunteers. While the Confederates had won a technical victory, a unit of about 500 Coloradans had gone behind Confederate lines and destroyed more than 70 wagons loaded with Confederate food and gear. Without sufficient provisions to lay siege to Fort Union, the Confederates retreated.

The retreating soldiers lacked blankets to keep their sick and wounded warm in the cold weather. Louisa went to visit their wounded and decided to retrieve hidden stores of field blankets and turn her home into a field hospital. She led a company of nurses to care for the sick and dying men and made trips to outlying encampments to bring her patients into Santa Fe or treat in situ those soldiers who could not be brought into the city. For these efforts, she became known as the Angel of Santa Fe. It was not until April 1 or 2 that General Sibley, who had been at Albuquerque most of this time, arrived at Santa Fe and personally met with Louisa, though it is not known what transpired between them.

== Later life and death ==
General Edward Canby was reassigned to the eastern United States after the defeat of the Confederates in the New Mexico Territory. Louisa traveled with him, where he spent more than a year in bureaucratic service in Pennsylvania, New York, and Washington, D.C., sometimes as an unofficial administrative assistant to Secretary of War Edwin M. Stanton. In 1864, Edward was sent to the Trans-Mississippi region, where they eventually found a home in New Orleans. Louisa stayed there while her husband supported the Union's impending victory over Confederate forces, which happened to include the remnants of Sibley's brigade.

Shortly before his 47th birthday, Edward was shot by a sniper while on an inspection tour up the Mississippi and White Rivers. He described his wound as a "painful but 'through-and-through'" gunshot to the pelvis. He arrived home the day after his birthday, and Louisa immediately putting him to bed helped with his recovery during the next month.

Following the war, Edward was retained by the army as one of ten brigadier generals and served as military commander of various districts throughout the South. In an 1873 newspaper article, Susan Wallace recalled that Louisa practiced charity, tending to give things away to the needy wherever she went in the South. "I can hardly keep anything; there is so much suffering about us," Louisa wrote Wallace from New Orleans. She sometimes pleaded the case of someone in need to her husband if she thought he might help. Wallace also said that Louisa was far more sociable than her husband and that she, rather than he, would arrange for any gatherings at the Canby residence.

The Canbys next moved to Portland, Oregon, where the general became commander of the Department of the Columbia. He was killed in 1873 during the Modoc War and buried in Indianapolis. At her husband's funeral service in Portland, Oregon, Louisa arranged for a clergyman representing three Protestant denominations to share in the service. At her final funeral service in Indianapolis, Indiana, a Baptist and a Methodist shared duties.
