= Edward Canby =

U.S. Army general & military governor (1817–1873)

Edward R. S. Canby
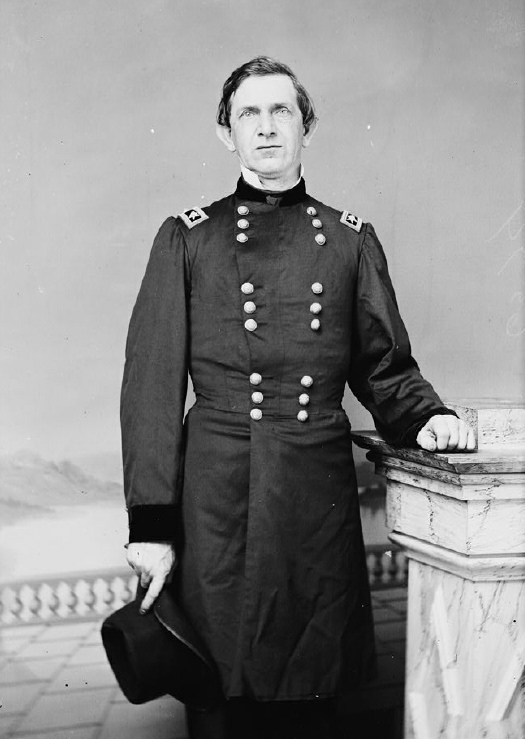
- Canby, 1860–1865
- Born: Edward Richard Sprigg Canby; November 9, 1817; Piatt's Landing, Kentucky, US
- Died: April 11, 1873 (aged 55) near Tule Lake, California, US
- Burial place: Crown Hill Cemetery and Arboretum, Section 9, Lot 1; 39.8169916°N 86.1724421°W
- Spouse: Louisa Hawkins Canby
- Military career
- Allegiance: United States: Union
- Branch: United States Army: Union Army
- Service years: 1839–1873
- Rank: Major general
- Commands: Department of New Mexico; Fort Snelling
- Conflicts: Indian Wars; Second Seminole War; Mexican–American War; Battle of Contreras; Battle of Churubusco; Battle of Mexico City; Utah War; Indian Wars; Navajo War of 1860; American Civil War; Battle of Valverde; Battle of Peralta; Battle of Spanish Fort; Battle of Fort Blakeley; Indian Wars; Modoc War

Edward Richard Sprigg Canby (November 9, 1817 – April 11, 1873) was a career United States Army officer and a Union general in the American Civil War. He served as a military governor after the war.

In 1861–1862, Canby commanded the Department of New Mexico, defeating the Confederate General Henry Hopkins Sibley at the Battle of Glorieta Pass, forcing him to retreat to Texas. At the war's end, he took the surrender of Generals Richard Taylor and Edmund Kirby Smith.

As commander of the Pacific Northwest in, Canby was killed in an altercation during the Peace Commission talks of April 11, 1873 by Kintpuash (Captain Jack) of the Modoc.

== Early life ==
Canby was born in Piatt's Landing, Kentucky, to Israel T. and Elizabeth (Piatt) Canby. He attended Wabash College, and transferred to the United States Military Academy, from which he graduated in 1839. He was commissioned a second lieutenant in the 2nd U.S. Infantry and served as the regimental adjutant.

Although he was often referred to as Edward Canby, a biographer has suggested that he was known as "Richard" during childhood and to some friends for most of his life. He was called "Sprigg" by fellow cadets at West Point, but during most of his career, he was generally referred to as E.R.S. Canby, sometimes signing his name "Ed. R.S. Canby."

== Marriage and family ==
He married Louisa Hawkins Canby at Crawfordsville, Indiana, August 1, 1839. She came from a family of three sisters and a brother, with whom she remained close. The Canbys had one child, a daughter, who did not survive childhood.

== Early military career ==
During his early career, Canby served in the Second Seminole War in Florida and saw combat during the Mexican–American War, where he received three brevet promotions, including to major for Contreras and Churubusco, and lieutenant colonel for Belén Gates. He also served at various posts, including Upstate New York and in the adjutant general's office in California from 1849 until 1851, covering the period of the territory's transition to statehood.

Against his wishes, he was assigned to what was supposed to be the civilian post of custodian of the California Archives from March 1850 until he left California in April 1851. The Archives included records of Spanish and Mexican governments in California, as well as Mission records and land titles. Evidently, Canby had some knowledge of the Spanish language, which was extremely useful as the government was trying to unravel land titles. The Filson Historical Society in Louisville, Kentucky holds what appears to be a document written in Canby's hand in Spanish, in which he identifies himself as "Edwardo [sic] Ricardo S. Canby."

Canby served in Wyoming and Utah, then both part of the Utah Territory, during the Utah War (1857–1858). During this period, he served on the panel of judges for the court martial of Captain Henry Hopkins Sibley. Sibley was acquitted. Subsequently, Canby wrote an endorsement for a teepee-like army tent which Sibley adapted from the American Indian style.

Both officers were later assigned to New Mexico, where in 1860 Canby coordinated a campaign against the Navajo, commanding Sibley in a futile attempt to capture and punish Navajo for "depredations" against the livestock of settlers. The campaign ended in frustration, with Canby and Sibley rarely sighting Navajo raiders. Usually they saw the Navajo at a distance and never got close to them.

== Civil War ==
At the start of the Civil War, Canby commanded Fort Defiance, New Mexico Territory. He was promoted to colonel of the 19th U.S. Infantry on May 14, 1861, and the following month commanded the Department of New Mexico. His former assistant Sibley resigned to join the Confederate Army, becoming a Brigadier General. Sibley's Army of New Mexico defeated Canby and his troops in February 1862 at the Battle of Valverde. Canby eventually forced the Confederates to retreat to Texas after the Union's strategic victory at the Battle of Glorieta Pass.

Immediately following this battle, Canby was promoted to brigadier general on March 31, 1862. Recombining the forces he had earlier divided, Canby set off in pursuit of the retreating Confederate forces, but he soon gave up the chase and allowed them to reach Texas. Shortly after the failure of the Confederate invasion of northern New Mexico, Canby was relieved of his command by Gen. James H. Carleton, and reassigned to the east.

Canby's achievement in New Mexico had largely been in his planning an overall defensive strategy. He and his opponent, Sibley, both had limited resources. Though Canby was a little better supplied, he saw that defending the entire territory from every possible attack would stretch his forces too thinly. Realizing that Sibley had to attack along a river, especially since New Mexico was in the middle of a long drought, Canby made the best use of his forces by defending against only two possible scenarios: an attack along the Rio Grande and an attack by way of the Pecos and Canadian rivers. He could easily shift the latter defensive force to protect Fort Union if the enemy attacked by way of the Rio Grande, which they did.

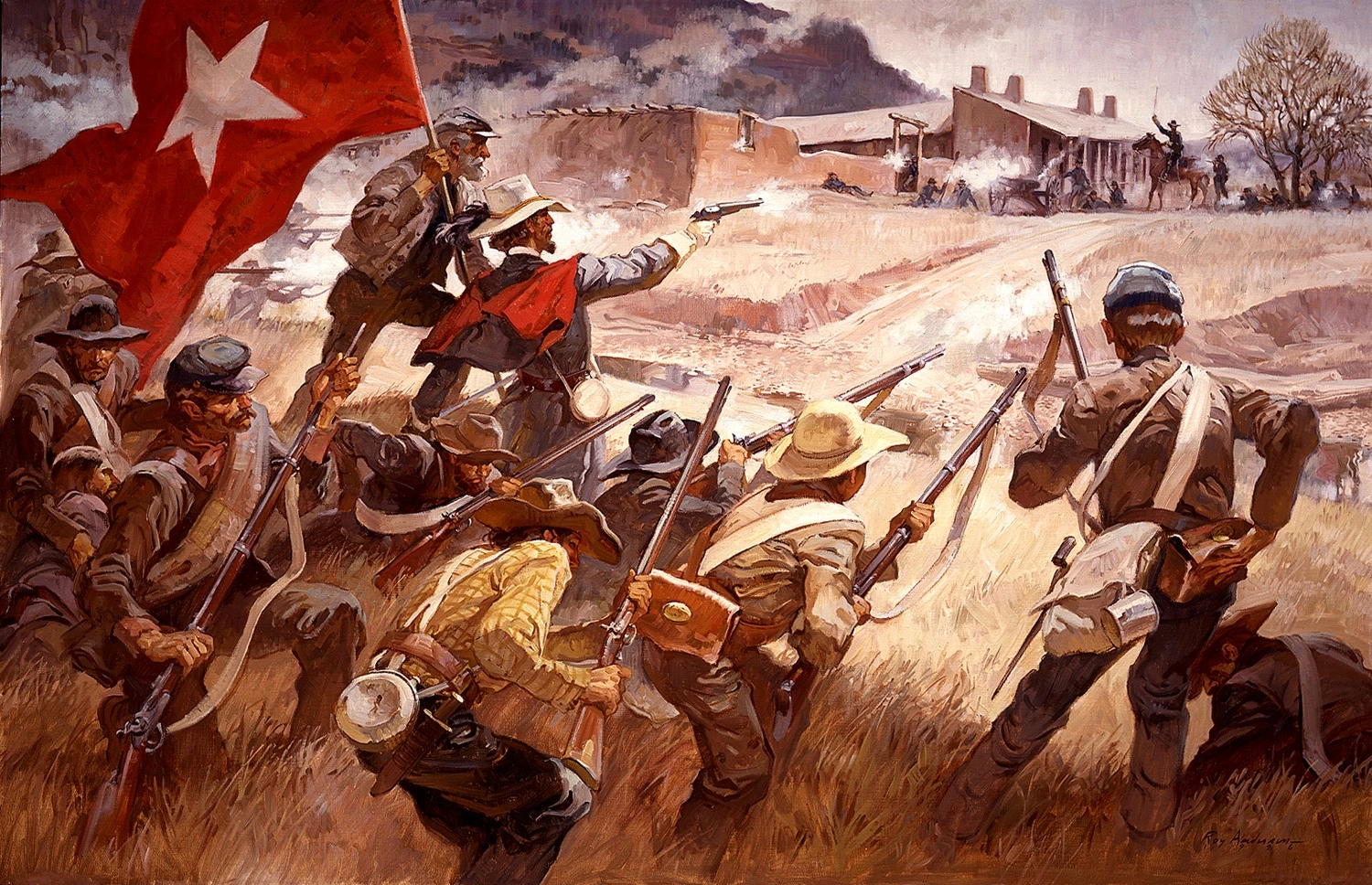
Battle of Glorieta Pass - Pigeon's Ranch

Canby persuaded the governors of New Mexico and Colorado to raise volunteer units to supplement regular Federal troops. The Colorado troops proved helpful at both Valverde and Glorieta. In spite of occasional superior soldiering by Confederate troops and junior commanders, Sibley's sluggishness and vacillation in executing a plan with high risk led to an almost inevitable Confederate collapse.

After a period of clerical duty, Canby was assigned as "commanding general of the city and harbor of New York City" on July 17, 1863. This assignment followed the New York Draft Riots, which caused about 120 deaths and extensive property damage. He served until November 9, reviving the draft, and overseeing a prisoner of war camp in New York Harbor. He then went to work in the office of the Secretary of War, unofficially describing himself in correspondence as an "Assistant Adjutant General." Looking back on Canby's record, a 20th-century adjutant general, Edward F. Witsell, described Canby's position as "similar to that of an Assistant to the Secretary of the Army."

In May 1864, Canby was promoted to major general and relieved Nathaniel P. Banks of his command at Simmesport, Louisiana. He next was assigned to the Midwest, where he commanded the Military Division of Western Mississippi. He was wounded in the upper thigh by a guerrilla while aboard the gunboat USS Cricket on the White River in Arkansas near Little Island on November 6, 1864.

In the spring of 1865, Canby commanded the Union forces assigned to conduct the campaign against Mobile, Alabama. This culminated in the Battle of Fort Blakeley, which led to the fall of Mobile on April 12, 1865. Canby accepted the surrender of the Confederate forces under General Richard Taylor in Citronelle, on May 4, 1865, and those under General Edmund Kirby Smith west of the Mississippi River on May 26, 1865.

Canby was generally regarded as a great administrator, but he was criticized as a soldier. Ulysses S. Grant thought him not aggressive enough. At one time, Grant sent Canby an order to "destroy [the enemy's] railroads, machine-shops, &c." Ten days later, Grant reprimanded him for requesting men and materials to build railroads. "I wrote... urging you to... destroy railroads, machine-shops, &c., not to build them", Grant said.

Canby could be a destroyer, but appeared to prefer the role of builder. If someone had a question about army regulations or Constitutional law affecting the military, Canby was the man to see. Grant came to appreciate this in peace time, once complaining vigorously when President Andrew Johnson proposed to assign Canby away from the capital, where Grant considered him irreplaceable.

=== Central Lunatic Asylum for Colored Insane ===
In April 1869, Secretary of War Edwin Stanton appointed General Canby as military governor of Virginia. Soon after Canby arrived in Richmond, he confiscated each of the medical facilities in the city and converted them for use by the Union Army. In the next several months, Canby was made aware of the critical medical and economic plight of thousands of formerly enslaved blacks in the state uprooted by the Civil War. Canby had to decide how to provide blacks access to health and mental health services without violating the racial pecking order that existed in the South.

One area in dispute was whether blacks would be allowed admission to the state's existing mental asylums at Williamsburg and Staunton. Racial integration of these two asylums had been debated in the legislature and the psychiatric community for over a decade. Dr. John Galt, superintendent of Eastern Lunatic Asylum at Williamsburg believed that free blacks and whites could be treated medically in the same facility as he had demonstrated. However, Dr. Francis Stribling, superintendent of Western Lunatic Asylum at Staunton refused to admit either free or enslaved blacks to his institution.

Following the death of Galt, Stribling became chair of an asylum planning committee that advised Canby and the Freedman's Bureau on a permanent admission policy for the black population. Stribling proposed that Virginia should construct a separate asylum for the admission and treatment of blacks with lunacy. Canby accepted his recommendation and included it as the basis of his military order number 136, published in December 1869. Canby's order required continued utilization of a rented annex at Howard's Grove Hospital as the temporary psychiatric hospital for blacks, until the state of Virginia could decide whether to maintain and expand it or construct a new facility.

In June 1870, the Virginia legislature accepted ownership of the Central Lunatic Asylum for Colored Insane, the first standalone facility in the United States. It remained located at the Howard's Grove site until 1885, when a new facility was constructed in Dinwiddie County some 40 miles south of Richmond, and renamed Central State Hospital. Canby should be credited with creating the first (racially segregated) mental hospital in the US for African Americans. The hospital remained segregated by race until the passage of the Civil Rights Act of 1964.

== Post-war assignments ==
After the war, Canby served as commander of military departments during Reconstruction, as the government tried to manage dramatic social changes while securing peace. He commanded Louisiana from 1864 to May 1866. He was next assigned as commander of the Department of Washington, which consisted of Delaware, Maryland, the District of Columbia, and Alexandria and Fairfax counties in Virginia, from June 1866 until August 1867. He was assigned to the command of the Second Military District, comprising North and South Carolina. In August 1868, he briefly resumed command in Washington.

In November 1868, he was assigned to the Fifth Military District, where he focused primarily on the reconstruction of Texas. He left Texas for Virginia, the First Military District, in April 1869, serving there until July 1870. Each of these postings occurred during Reconstruction and put Canby at the center of conflicts between Republicans and Democrats, whites and blacks, state and federal governments.

New state legislatures were writing constitutions, and the social climate was highly volatile, with insurgent attacks against freedmen and Republicans on the rise in numerous areas. Many of his districts had Ku Klux Klan chapters, which the US government was not able to suppress until the early 1870s. Canby sometimes alienated one side or the other, and often both. Charles W. Ramsdell called Canby "vigorous and firm, but just." Even political opponents, such as Jonathan Worth, governor of North Carolina, admitted that Canby was sincere and honest.

== Final assignment and death ==
In August 1872, Canby was posted to command the Pacific Northwest. He soon faced problems with the Modoc tribe, who had historically lived in Northern California. The United States government granted unceded Modoc land to emigrant settlers, who then pressured the Grant administration for forced removal. The policy of the California Governor Peter Hardeman Burnett in 1851 was "extermination". This policy was continued by Governor Leland Stanford who signed into law a number of bills to finance further "killing expeditions" and solicited volunteers for quasi-military campaigns against Indigenous Californians. These actions set the precedent for Modoc removal in 1872.

After a protracted conflict with the United States government and the Battle of Lost River, Modoc forces fortified themselves in the natural stone fortress of the Lava Beds, that came to be known as Captain Jack's Stronghold south of Tule Lake. A small band of "renegade" Modoc, predominately women and children, resisted attacks by American forces bringing the conflict to a stalemate.

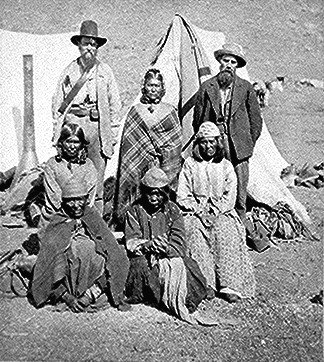
L to R, US Indian agent, Winema (Tobey) and her husband Frank Riddle (interpreter), with other Modoc women in front, 1873

General Canby had received conflicting orders from Washington as to whether to make peace or war on the Modoc. As war was not working, the US government authorized a peace commission and assigned Canby a key position on it. There were many lines of communication between the Modoc and Americans.

On April 11, 1873, after months of false starts and aborted meetings, Canby went to another parley, unarmed and with some hope of final resolution. Judge Elijah Steele of Yreka, California wrote later that when he warned Canby that the Modoc were volatile and he was at risk, Canby replied, "I believe you are right, Mr. Steele, and I shall regard your advice, but it would not be very well for the general in command to be afraid to go where the peace commissioners would venture." The peace talks were held midway between the army encampment and Captain Jack's stronghold near Tule Lake. It was discovered later that two members of Canby's party brought concealed weapons and Modoc warriors were also armed.

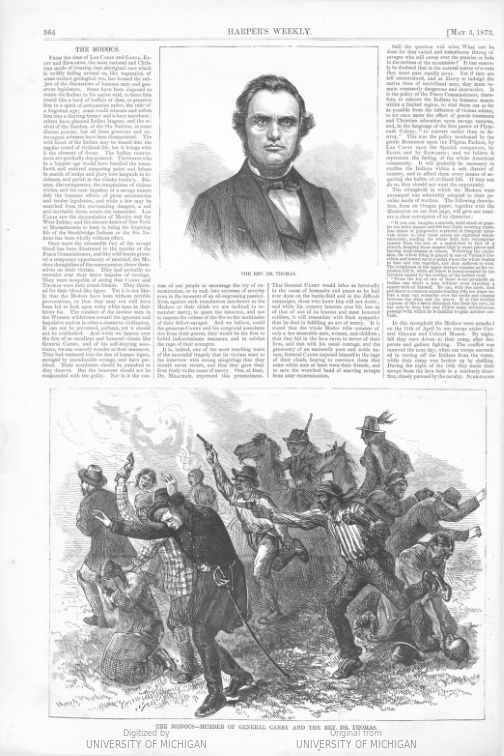
Murder of General Canby and the Rev. Dr. Thomas, May 1873 print

According to Jeff C. Riddle, the Modoc son of the US interpreter and the author of Indian History of the Modoc War (1914), the Modoc had plotted before the meeting to kill Canby and the other commissioners, as they believed peace was not possible. They were determined to "fight until we die." He was the son of Winema and Frank Riddle. Captain Jack had been reluctant to agree to the killings, believing it "coward's work", but was pressured by other warriors to agree. He insisted on being given another chance to ask Canby to "give us a home in our country." When Canby said he did not have the authority to make such a promise, Captain Jack attacked the general. With Ellen's Man, one of his lieutenants, he shot Canby twice in the head and cut his throat. The Modoc also killed Reverend Eleazar Thomas, a peace commissioner, and wounded others in the party.

=== Aftermath ===
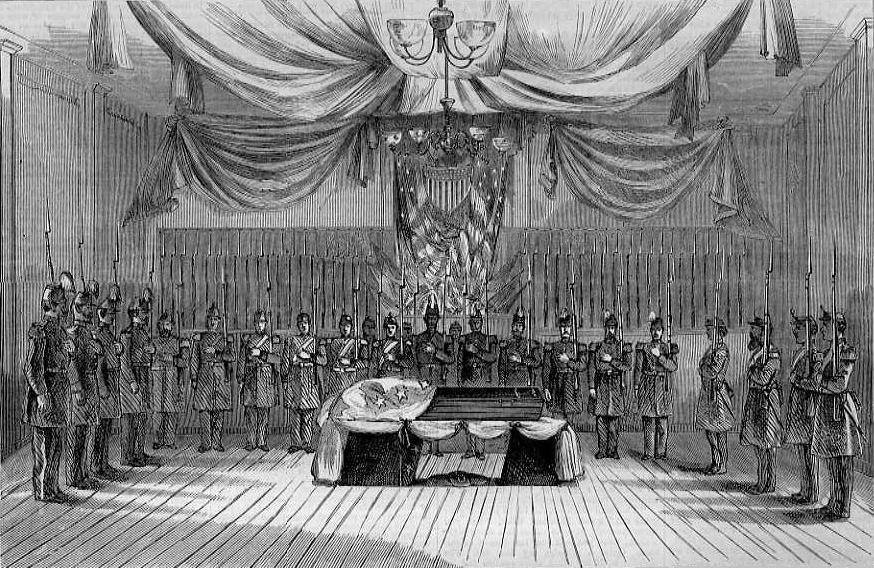
Funeral of the Late General Canby -- the Body Lying in State

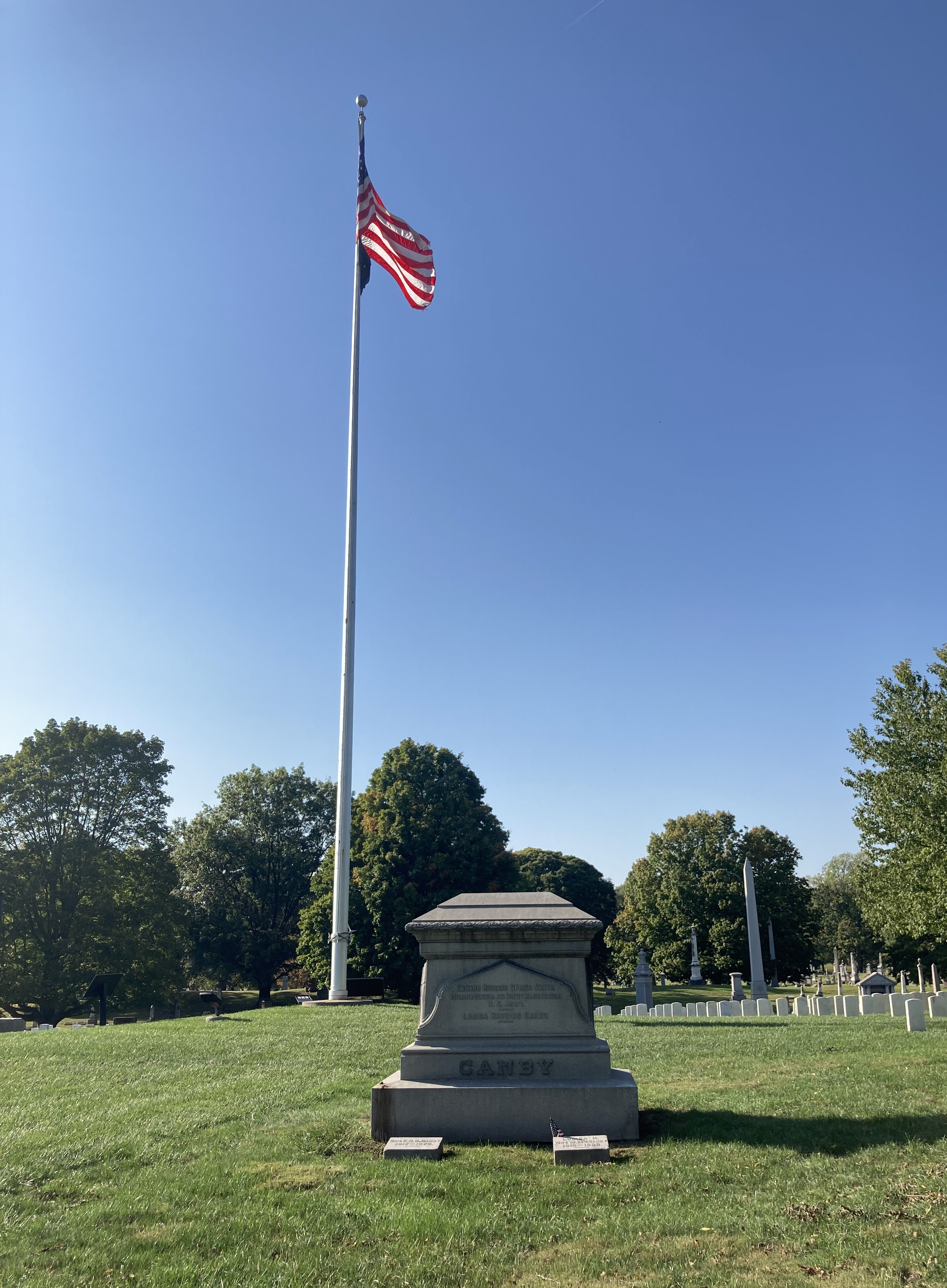
Canby's grave at Crown Hill Cemetery

Following Canby's death, national outrage was expressed against the Modoc. Eastern newspapers called for blood vengeance, except for one in Georgia, which headlined the story: "Captain Jack and Warriors Revenge the South By Murdering General Canby, One of Her Greatest Oppressors." E.C. Thomas, son of the murdered peace commissioner, recognized the inevitability of reprisals for the killings, but said: "To be sure, peace will come through war, but not by extermination."

Eventually, Captain Jack (Kintpuash), Boston Charley, Schonchin John, Black Jim, Barncho, and Sloluck were tried for "murder in violation of the laws of war", convicted, and sentenced to death. President Grant commuted the sentences of Barncho and Sloluck to life imprisonment. The other condemned men were all executed on October 3, 1873. The surviving Modoc were sent to reservations. Barncho died in prison in 1875. Sloluck was released from prison in 1878.

The killing of Canby, and the Great Sioux War, undermined public confidence in President Grant's peace policy, according to the historian Robert Utley. There was growing public sentiment for full defeat of the American Indians.

After memorial services were performed on the West Coast, Canby's body was returned to Indiana and buried in Crown Hill Cemetery in Indianapolis, Indiana on May 23, 1873. At least four Union generals attended his funeral there: William Tecumseh Sherman, Philip Sheridan, Lew Wallace, and Irvin McDowell, and the latter two served among the pall bearers. A reporter noted that, although the funeral procession was generally reserved, "more than once, expressions of hatred toward the Modoc" marred the silence.

== Legacy and honors ==
- 1871, he was awarded an honorary degree by Wesleyan University of Middletown, Connecticut.
- 1875, Fort Canby, a coast defense installation guarding the entrance to the Columbia River, is named in his honor.
- 1880s, Canby's Cross was erected in his honor near the site of the peace talks, in the area later designated as the Lava Beds National Monument.
- The towns of Canby in Clackamas County, Oregon, Canby in Yellow Medicine County, Minnesota, and Canby in Modoc County, California, are named for him.
- Canby, Oregon's annual July 4th celebration used to be called General Canby Days, with activities including a pancake breakfast, car show, parade and music.

== See also ==
- List of American Civil War generals (Union)
