= Camp Randall Memorial Arch =

American triumphal arch

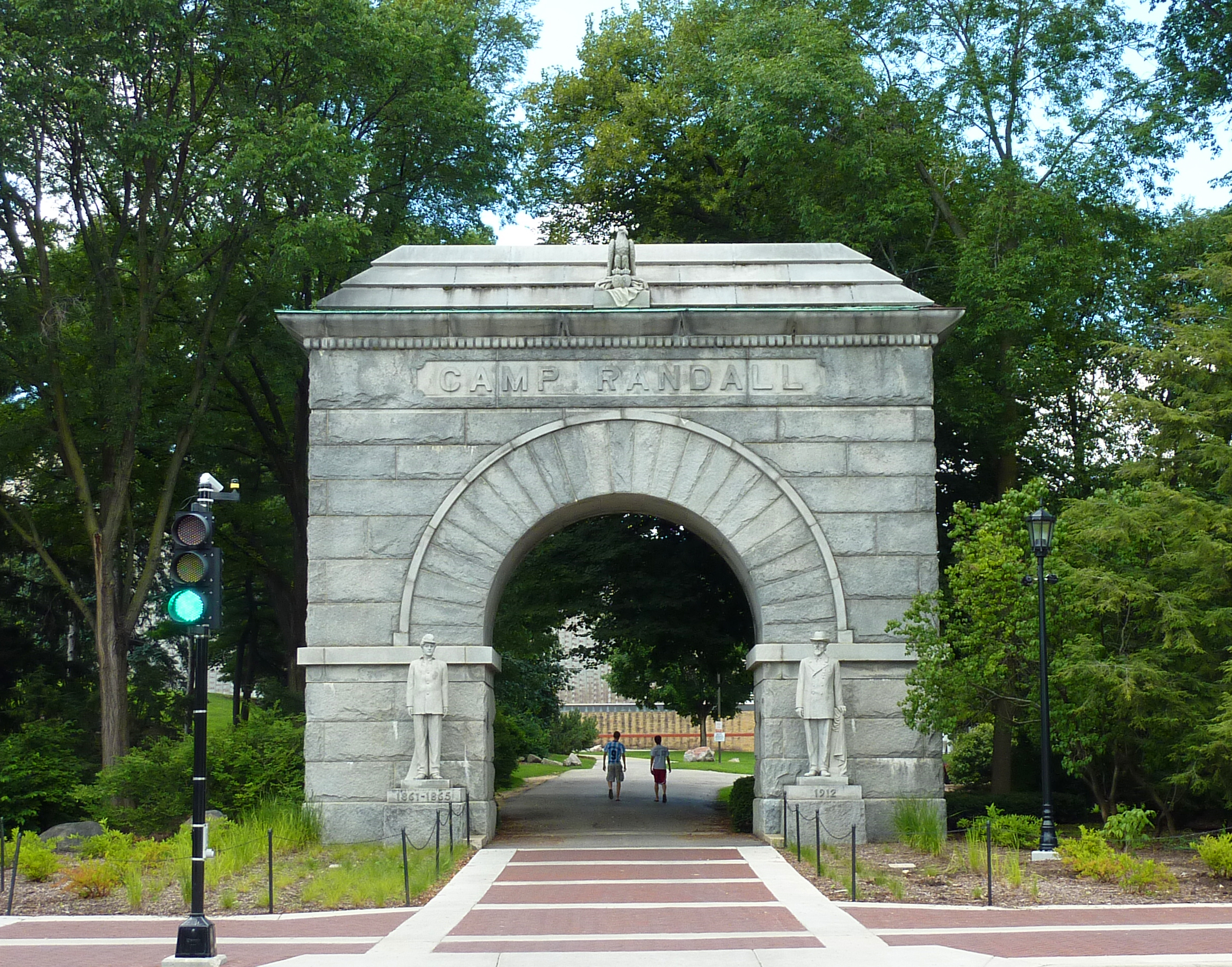
- The arch viewed from North Randall Avenue
- Interactive map of Camp Randall Memorial Arch
- Location: Madison, Wisconsin, U.S.
- Coordinates: 43.0711°N 89.4094°W
- Designer: Lew F. Porter
- Fabricator: Woodbury Granite Company
- Type: Triumphal arch
- Width: Approximately 30 feet (9.1 meters)
- Height: Approximately 30 feet (9.1 meters)
- Dedicated date: June 19, 1912

The Camp Randall Memorial Arch is a commemorative triumphal arch designed by Madison-based architect Lew F. Porter and manufactured by the Woodbury Granite Company. The arch was dedicated in June of 1912 as a tribute to the 70,000+ soldiers from the state of Wisconsin who received military training at Camp Randall between 1861 and 1865 during the American Civil War. The monument is located at the intersection of North Randall Avenue and West Dayton Street in downtown Madison just outside of Camp Randall Stadium.

== History ==
Camp Randall during the American Civil War in 1861

Camp Randall was first established on May 1, 1861 at the outbreak of the American Civil War, the camp was named after the then sixth Governor of Wisconsin, Alexander W. Randall. The camp was established as a training camp in order to train Wisconsin volunteers and recruits of the Union Army during the war. The camp was made up of a 53-acre plot which consisted of 40 barracks, a camp hospital, officers quarters, stables, and a camp commissary. Between 1861 and 1865 roughly 70,000 of the state's 91,327 troops trained at Camp Randall during their terms of service. In 1862 roughly 1,400 Confederate prisoners of war who were captured at the Battle of Island Number Ten were transferred to Camp Randall, many of these soldiers perished while in captivity and are buried at Confederate Rest in the nearby Forest Hill Cemetery.

Following the war the camp was used intermittently as a host site for the Wisconsin State Fair and was occasionally used as a circus ground for Barnum & Bailey. Beginning in the 1890's the property of Camp Randall was spectated by a group of local Wisconsin businessmen including the Mayor of Madison, Robert McKee Bashford. Wisconsin Brigadier General Lucius Fairchild made a proposition to the Wisconsin State Legislature that if the state legislature did not purchase the property that he would buy it himself. The state of Wisconsin eventually purchased the property for $25,000 on April 29, 1893 and donated the property to the University of Wisconsin–Madison.

=== Monument commission ===
Beginning in 1911 a commission was created and approved by Wisconsin Governor Francis E. McGovern in order to design and erect a triumphal arch and dedicate it to the Wisconsin Union veterans of the American Civil War. The arch itself was financed by the state of Wisconsin for an estimated total of $25,000. The commission was headed Jerome Anthony Watrous. McGovern appointed the following veterans to lead the monument commission:

- Colonel Jerome Anthony Watrous, adjutant of the 6th Wisconsin Infantry Regiment.
- Colonel Clement Warner, commander of the 36th Wisconsin Infantry Regiment.
- Reverend William John McKay, a boy soldier who served in Company I of the 44th Wisconsin Infantry Regiment.

=== Design ===
The Camp Randall Memorial Arch was partially designed by Lew F. Porter, a local Madison architect and was fabricated by the Woodbury Granite Company of Woodbury, Vermont, the same granite contractor for the Wisconsin State Capitol. According to the National Register of Historic Places, the arch itself is approximately 30 ft (9.1 m) tall and 30 ft (9.1 m) wide. The monument features two life-sized statues of a Union soldier on the left with the inscription (1861 -1865) and a member of the Grand Army of the Republic (1912) 50 years later. The top of the arch features Old Abe, the regimental mascot of the 8th Wisconsin Infantry Regiment.

The arch features two 40 in (1.0 m) x 50 in (1.3 m) plaques, the south plaque features a list of all regiments and their locations of muster within the state of Wisconsin including:

- Madison, Wisconsin:
  - Camp Randall: the 2nd,5th, 6th, 7th, 8th, 11th, 12th, 15th, 16th, 17th, 20th, 23rd, 29th, 30th, 36th, 37th, 38th, 40th, 42nd, 44th, 45th, 46th, 47th, 49th, 50th, 52nd, 53rd infantry regiments, the 11th and 12th Light Artillery, Batteries A, E, F, G, H, I, K, L & M of the 1st Wisconsin Heavy Artillery, and Company G, 1st United States Sharpshooters.
- Milwaukee:
  - Camp Scott: the 1st Wisconsin Infantry Regiment.
  - Camp Sigel: the 9th, 24th, 26th, & 27th infantry regiments.
  - Camp Washburn: the 28th, 34th, 35th, 39th, 43rd, 48th, 51st infantry regiments, 2nd Wisconsin Cavalry, the 13th Light Artillery, and batteries B, C, and D of the 1st Wisconsin Heavy Artillery Regiment.
  - Camp Holton: the 10th Wisconsin Infantry Regiment.
- Prairie du Chien and Racine:
  - Camp Utley: the 19th, 22nd, 33rd infantry regiments, four companies of the 31st (Racine), six companies of the 31st (Prairie du Chien), the 1st, 2nd, 3rd, 4th, 5th, 6th, 7th, 8th, 9th, and 10th Independent Batteries of Light Artillery.
- Ripon, Wisconsin:
  - Camp Frémont: 1st Wisconsin Cavalry Regiment.
- Kenosha, Wisconsin:
  - Camp Harvey: 1st Wisconsin Cavalry Regiment.
- Janesville, Wisconsin:
  - Camps Treadway: 13th Wisconsin Infantry Regiment.
  - Camp Barstow: 3rd Wisconsin Cavalry Regiment.
- Fond du Lac, Wisconsin:
  - Camps Hamilton & Wood: 3rd and 14th.
- Oshkosh, Wisconsin:
  - Camp Bragg: the 21st and 32nd infantry regiments.
- La Crosse, Wisconsin:
  - Camp Salomon: the 25th Wisconsin Infantry Regiment.

The north plaque on the arch states the following:

"Erected by the State of Wisconsin to mark the entrance through which passed seventy thousand of her soldier sons and five hundred thousand relatives and friends during the war from 1861 to 1865 ******

"Lest we forget"

MDCCCCXII".

=== Monument dedication ===
The statue was unveiled to the public on June 18, 1912 to a crowd of roughly 560 Civil War veterans and family members, the formal dedication of the monument took place a day later on June 19. The statue was dedicated after several speeches made by notable dignitaries including McKay, Governor McGovern, Colonel Watrous, Duncan McGregor, and Bishop Samuel Fallows, among others.

=== 100th anniversary ===
The Camp Randall Memorial Arch celebrated its centennial anniversary in June of 2012.

== Gallery ==
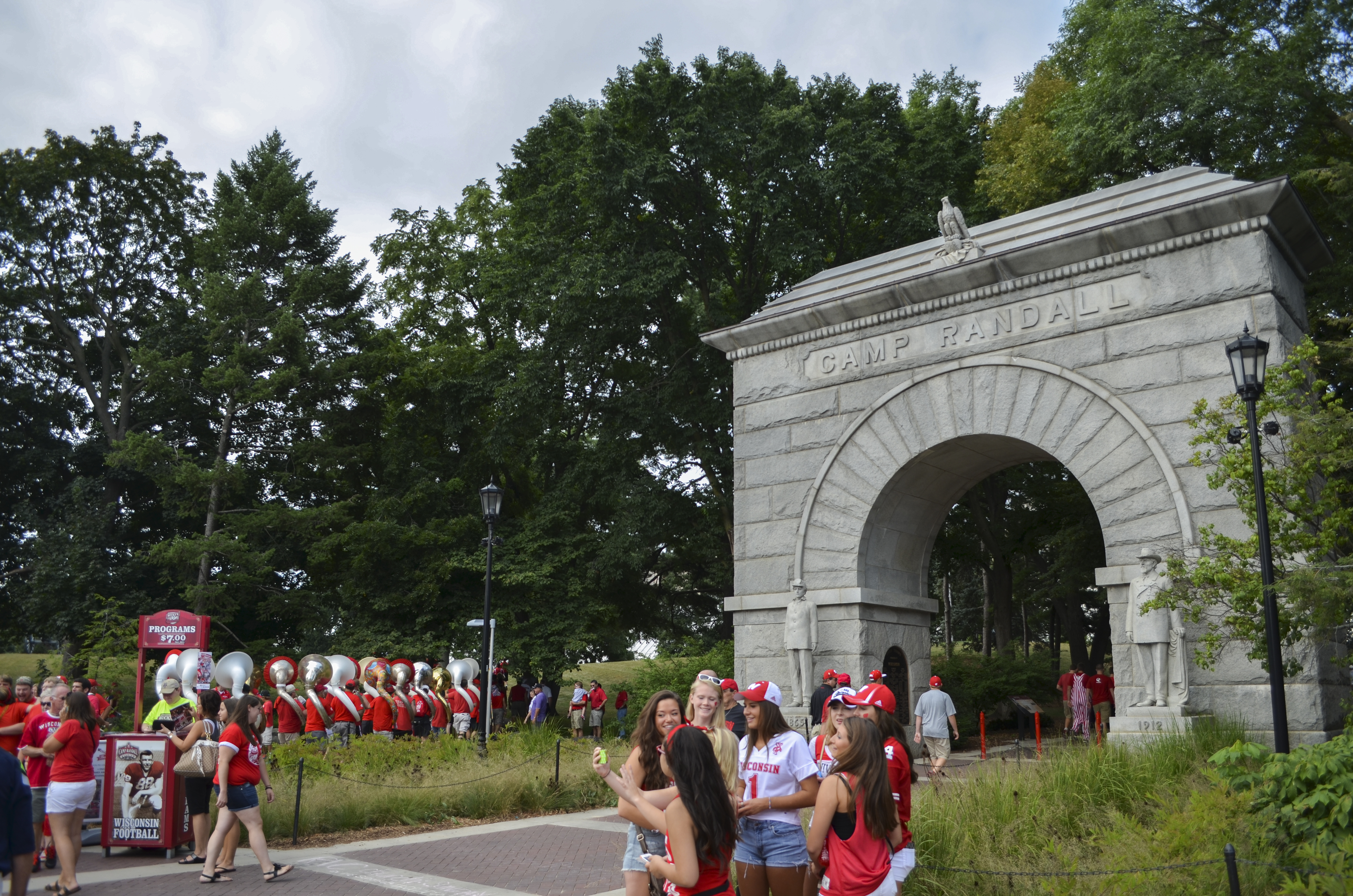
The Camp Randall Memorial Arch on August 31, 2013 before UW vs. UMASS

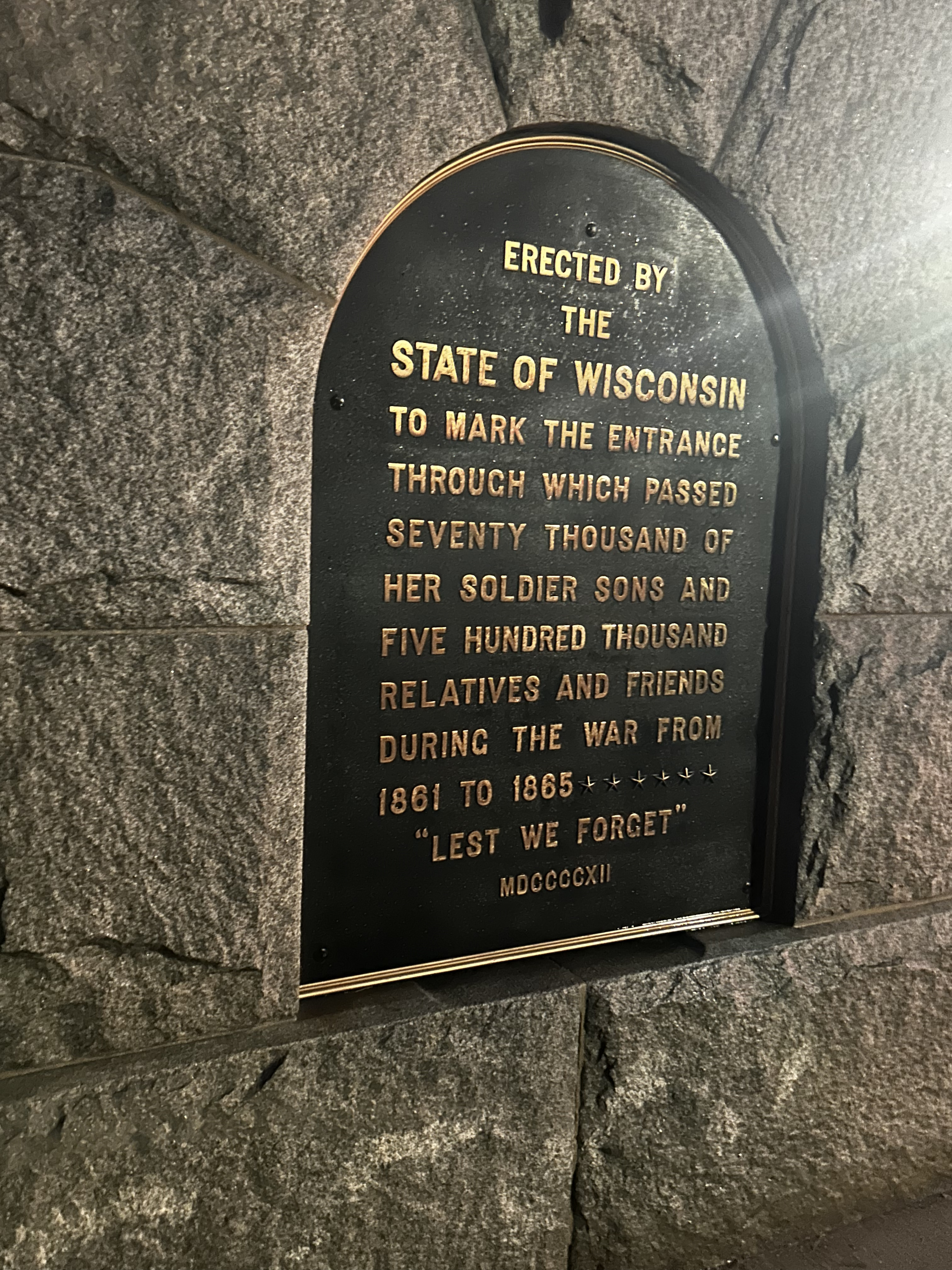
The north commemorative plaque

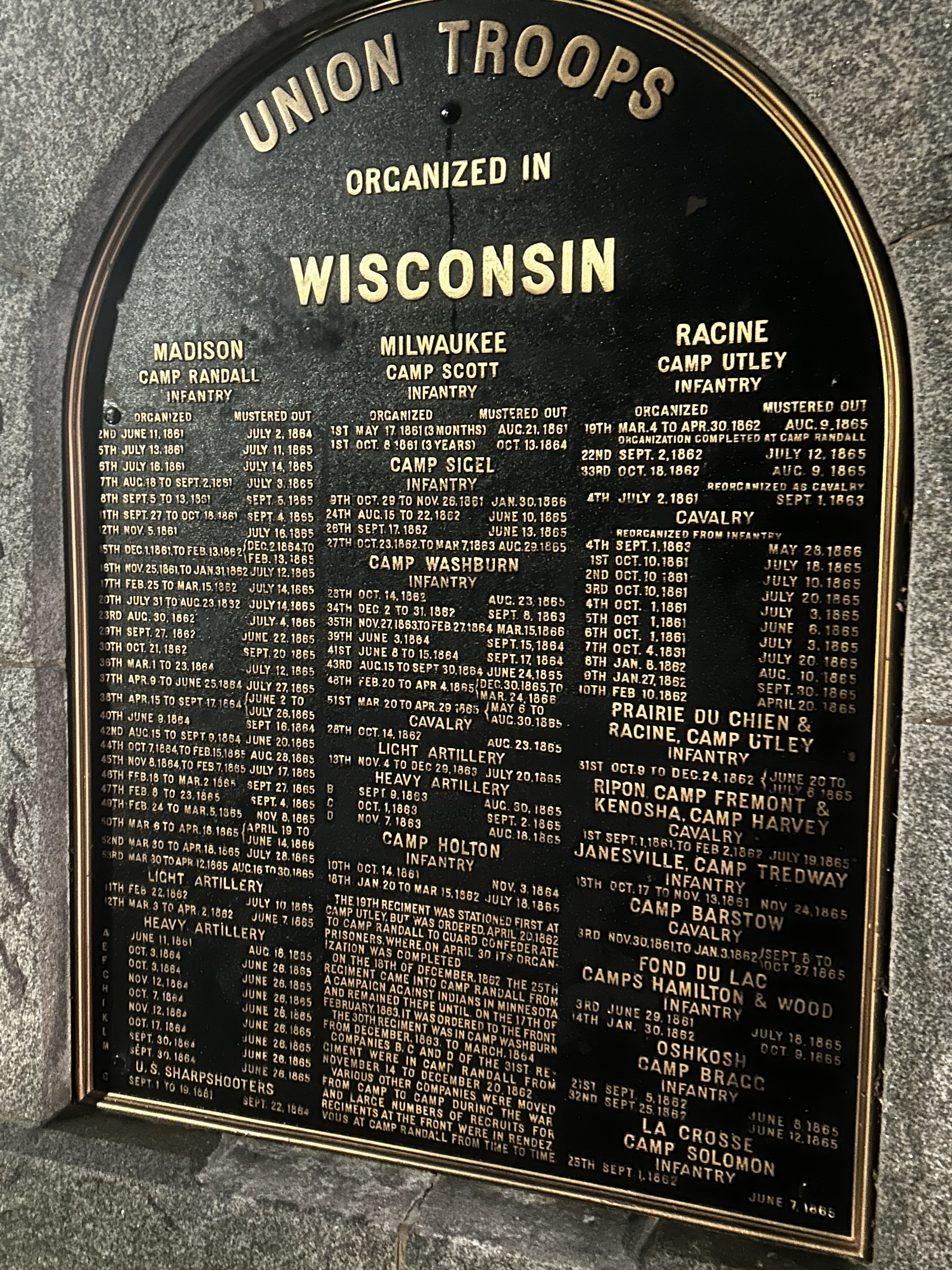
The south plaque

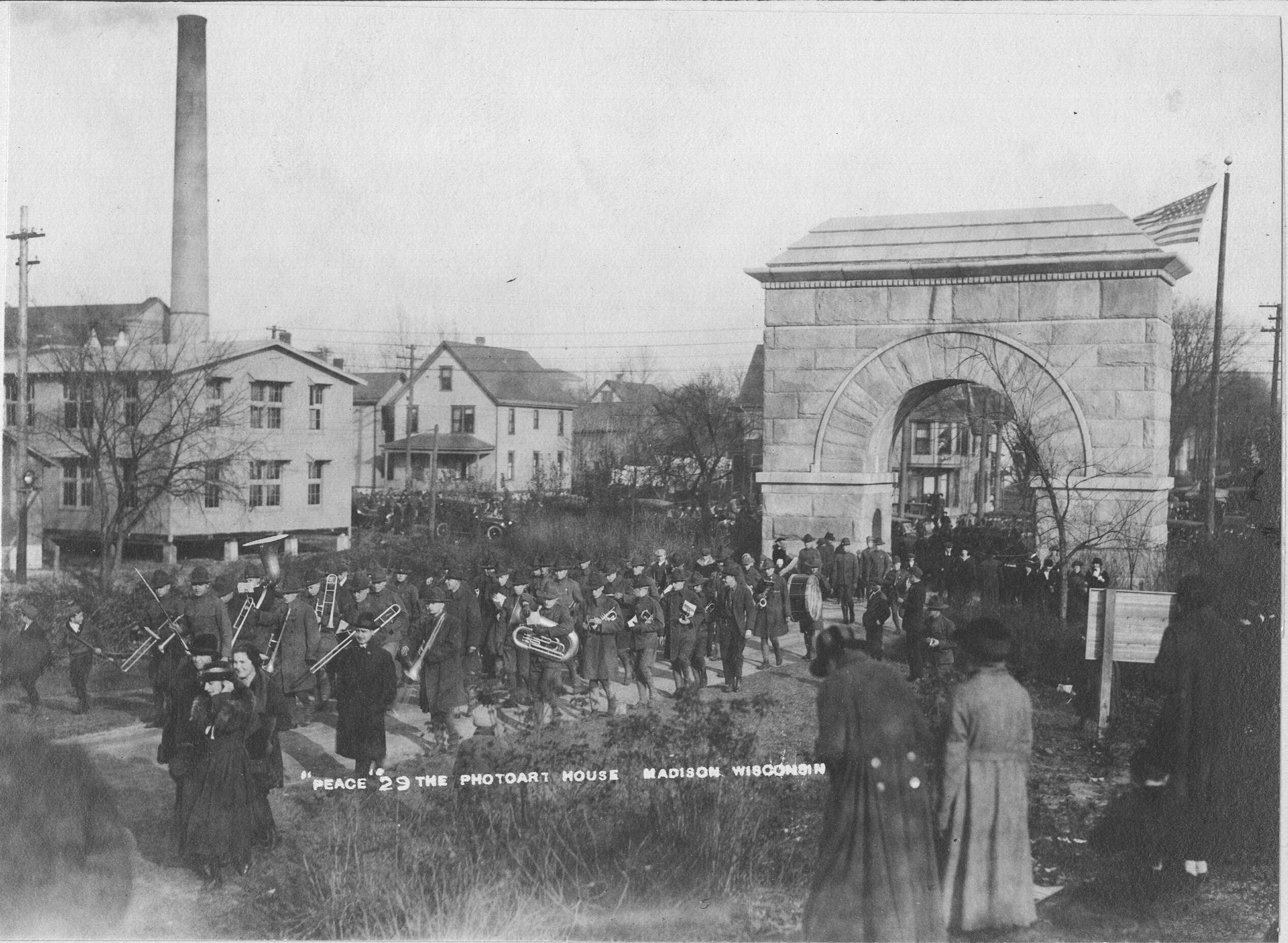
Peace Day celebration at the Camp Randall Memorial Arch on February 28, 1919

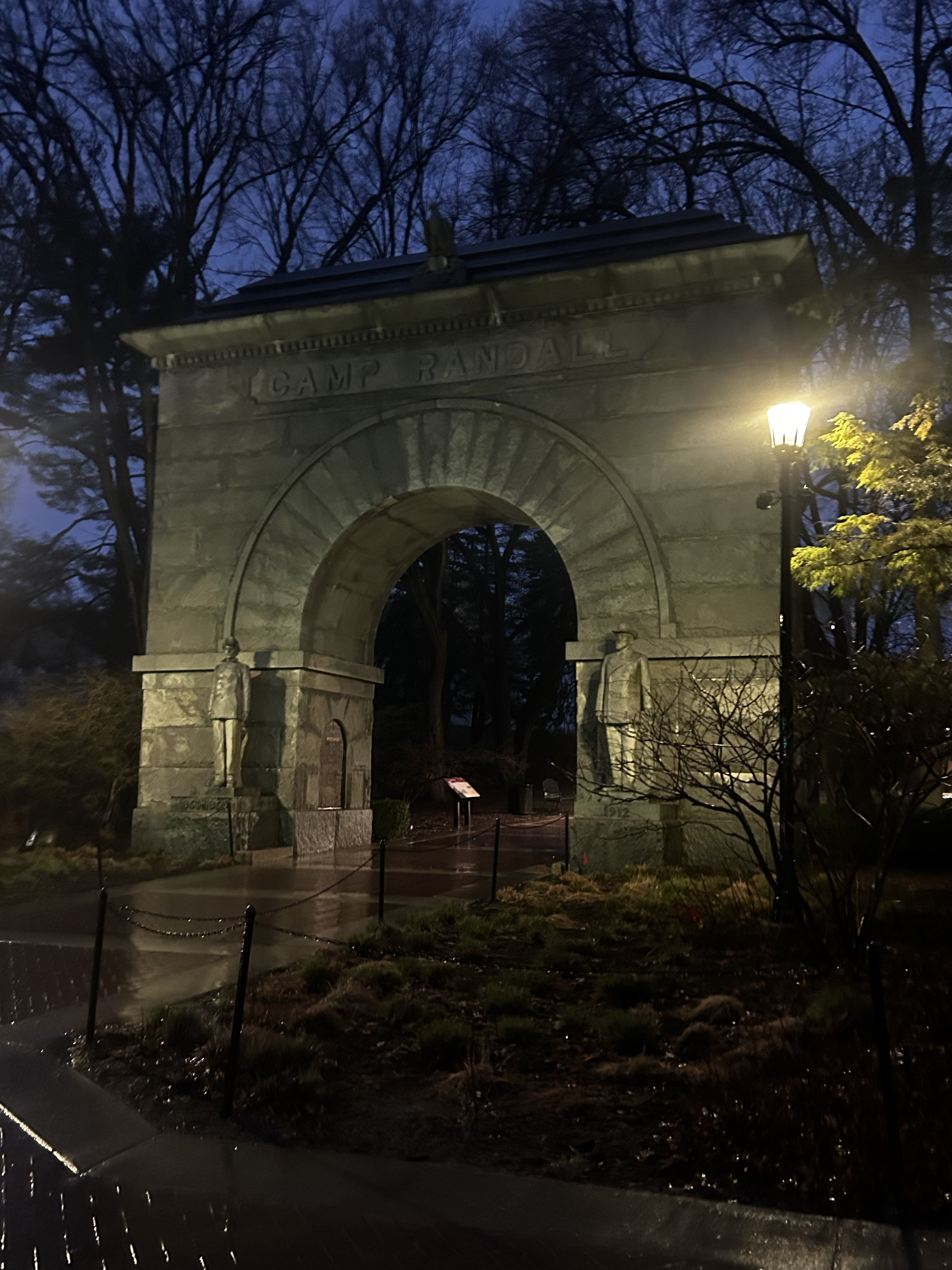
The Camp Randall Arch on a rainy night

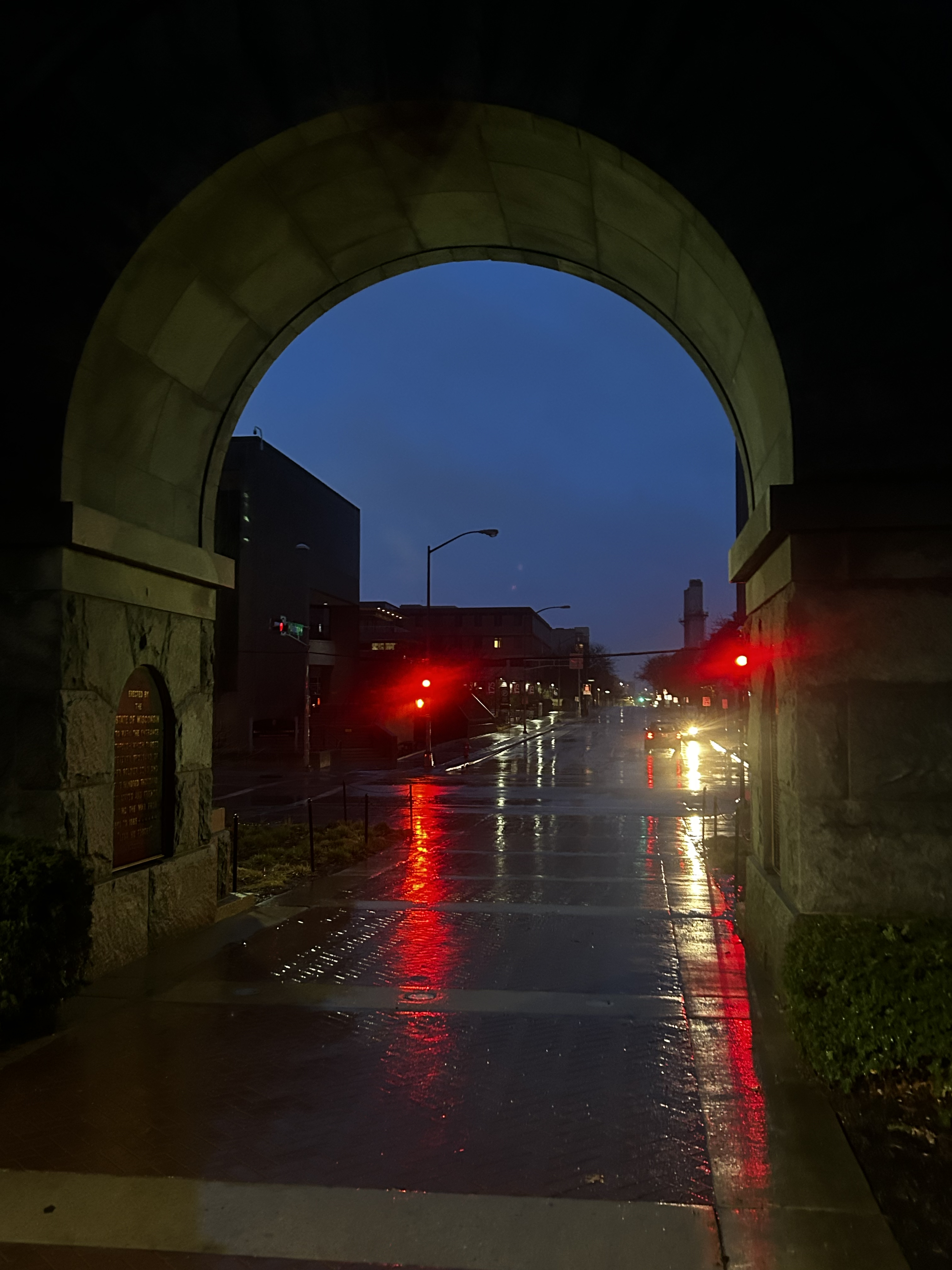
Opposite side of the arch facing eastward towards Dayton Street
