= Judson G. Hart =

American farmer and politician

Member of the Wisconsin State Assembly from the Milwaukee 10th district
- In office January 6, 1879 – January 5, 1880
- Preceded by: Frederick Moskowitt
- Succeeded by: Washington Boorse

Personal details
- Born: June 13, 1842 Wauwatosa, Wisconsin Territory, U.S.
- Died: January 16, 1913 (aged 70) Milwaukee, Wisconsin, U.S.
- Resting place: Prairie Home Cemetery, Waukesha, Wisconsin
- Party: Republican
- Spouse: Elizabeth S. Brown (m. 1866; died 1906)
- Children: Susie Brown (Bruce); (b. 1872; died 1947)

Military service
- Allegiance: United States
- Branch/service: United States Volunteers; Union Army
- Years of service: 1861–1865
- Rank: Corporal, USV
- Unit: 1st Reg. Wis. Vol. Infantry; 7th Bty. Wis. Light Artillery
- Battles/wars: American Civil War

Judson Gilbert Hart (June 13, 1842 – January 16, 1913) was an American farmer and politician. He served one term (1879) in the Wisconsin State Assembly, representing northern Milwaukee County, and served as a volunteer in the Union Army during the American Civil War.

== Biography ==
Born in Wauwatosa, Wisconsin Territory, Hart was a farmer. He served in the 1st Wisconsin Volunteer Infantry Regiment (3 Months) and later the 7th Independent Battery Wisconsin Light Artillery during the American Civil War. He served as town treasurer. Hart also served in the Wisconsin State Assembly, in 1879, as a Republican. He died in Milwaukee, Wisconsin.
