= 33rd Wisconsin Infantry Regiment =

Union Army infantry regiment

- Flag of Wisconsin
- Active: October 18, 1862 – August 8, 1865
- Country: United States
- Allegiance: Union
- Branch: Infantry
- Size: Regiment
- Engagements: American Civil War: Vicksburg Campaign; Battle of Nashville; Red River Campaign; Mobile Campaign; Battle of Spanish Fort

Commanders
- Colonel: Jonathan Baker Moore
- Lt. Colonel: Frederick S. Lovell
- Lt. Colonel: Horatio H. Virgin

The 33rd Wisconsin Infantry Regiment was a volunteer infantry regiment that served in the Union Army during the American Civil War.

== Service ==
The 33rd Wisconsin was organized at Racine, Wisconsin, and mustered into Federal service October 18, 1862.

The regiment was mustered out on August 8, 1865.

== Casualties ==
The 33rd Wisconsin suffered 3 officers and 30 enlisted men killed in action or who later died of their wounds, plus another 2 officers and 167 enlisted men who died of disease, for a total of 202 fatalities.

== Commanders ==
- Colonel Jonathan Baker Moore
- Lt. Colonel Frederick S. Lovell
- Lt. Colonel Horatio H. Virgin

== Notable members ==
- Robert H. DeLap, Wisconsin politician
- Frederick S. Lovell, was lieutenant colonel, later became colonel of the 46th Wisconsin Infantry Regiment and received an honorary brevet to brigadier general. Before the war he was a Wisconsin legislator.
- William Warner, Missouri politician

== See also ==
- List of Wisconsin Civil War units
- Wisconsin in the American Civil War
