= Frederick S. Lovell =

19th century American lawyer and politician

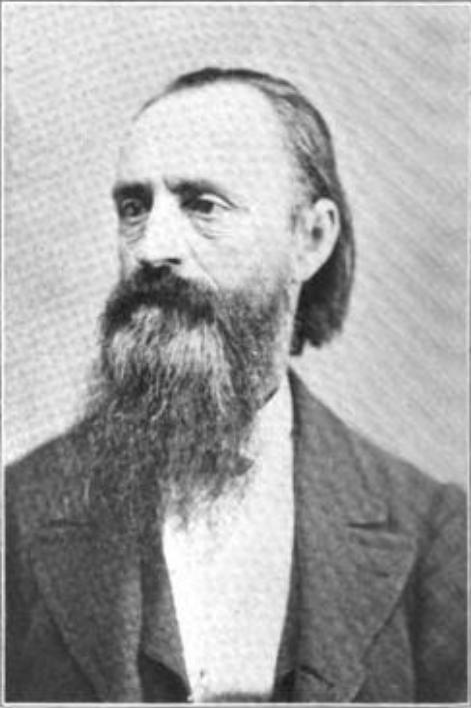

11th Speaker of the Wisconsin State Assembly
- In office January 13, 1858 – January 12, 1859
- Preceded by: Wyman Spooner
- Succeeded by: William P. Lyon

Member of the Wisconsin State Assembly from the Kenosha 1st district
- In office January 1, 1857 – January 1, 1859
- Preceded by: Henry Johnson
- Succeeded by: George Bennett

Member of the Council of the Wisconsin Territory from Racine County
- In office January 4, 1847 – March 13, 1848 Serving with: Marshall Strong (1847); Philo White (1848)
- Preceded by: Michael Frank
- Succeeded by: Position Abolished

Personal details
- Born: Frederick Solon Lovell; November 1, 1813 Bennington, Vermont, US
- Died: May 15, 1878 (aged 64) Kenosha, Wisconsin, US
- Resting place: Green Ridge Cemetery, Kenosha, Wisconsin
- Party: Republican; Democratic (before 1854)
- Education: Hobart College
- Profession: lawyer, politician

Military service
- Allegiance: United States
- Branch/service: United States Army; Union Army
- Years of service: 1862–1865
- Rank: Colonel, USV; Brevet Brigadier General, USV
- Unit: 33rd Reg. Wis. Vol. Infantry
- Commands: 46th Reg. Wis. Vol. Infantry
- Battles/wars: American Civil War: Vicksburg campaign; Siege of Vicksburg; Jackson Expedition; Red River Campaign; Franklin–Nashville Campaign; Battle of Nashville

Frederick Solon Lovell (November 1, 1813 – May 14, 1878) was an American lawyer and politician. He was the 11th Speaker of the Wisconsin State Assembly, was a delegate to both Wisconsin constitutional conventions, and was a Union Army officer in the American Civil War.

== Biography ==
Lovell was born on November 1, 1813, in Bennington, Vermont. He graduated from Hobart College before moving to Southport, in the Wisconsin Territory (now Kenosha, Wisconsin) in 1837 and practicing law. Lovell died on May 14, 1878.

== Political career ==
Lovell served in the two Wisconsin Constitutional Conventions in 1846 and 1848 as a Representative of Racine County, which at the time comprised all of the territory of modern-day Racine and Kenosha counties. He also served in the Wisconsin Territorial Council during the final years of the Territory. Ten years later, after Kenosha County separated from Racine, Lovell was elected to represent Kenosha County in the Wisconsin State Assembly for the 1857 and 1858 sessions. He was elected Speaker for the 1858 session. He was a Republican.

== Military career ==
Lovell joined the Union Army in August 1862 during the American Civil War and was commissioned Lieutenant Colonel for the 33rd Wisconsin Volunteer Infantry Regiment as it was organized in Racine, Wisconsin. The 33rd Wisconsin participated in the Western Theater of the American Civil War as a component of General Ulysses S. Grant's Army of the Tennessee. After the Vicksburg campaign, the 33rd's commander, Colonel Jonathan Baker Moore, was moved up to command the brigade and, later, the division, leaving Lt. Colonel Lovell in command of the regiment through most of 1863 and 1864, including their part in the Battle of Nashville, in December 1864.

In January 1865, Lovell was promoted to colonel and given command of the newly organized 46th Wisconsin Volunteer Infantry Regiment. The 46th Wisconsin did not see combat and served solely in defense of logistics and supply lines until the end of the war. Lovell was mustered out of the volunteers on September 27, 1865. On January 13, 1866, President Andrew Johnson nominated Lovell for a brevet to brigadier general of volunteers, effective from October 11, 1865. The United States Senate confirmed the appointment on March 12, 1866.

Military offices
Regiment created	Command of the 46th Wisconsin Volunteer Infantry Regiment; March 5, 1865 – October 11, 1865	Regiment disbanded
Wisconsin State Assembly
Preceded by Henry Johnson	Member of the Wisconsin State Assembly from the Kenosha 1st district January 1, 1857 – January 12, 1859	Succeeded by George Bennett
Preceded by Wyman Spooner	Speaker of the Wisconsin State Assembly; January 13, 1858 – January 12, 1859	Succeeded by William P. Lyon
