= 50th Wisconsin Infantry Regiment =

Union Army infantry regiment

- Flag of Wisconsin
- Active: March 1865 – June 12, 1866
- Country: United States
- Allegiance: Union
- Branch: Infantry
- Size: Regiment
- Engagements: American Civil War

Commanders
- Colonel: John G. Clark

The 50th Wisconsin Volunteer Infantry Regiment was a volunteer infantry regiment that served in the Union Army during the American Civil War.

== Service ==
The 50th Wisconsin was organized at Camp Randall in Madison, Wisconsin, by Colonel John G. Clark and mustered into Federal service between March and April 1865 with a total of 958 men. Leaving Madison, they arrived at St. Louis, Missouri, where they were assigned quarters at Benton Barracks. While Colonel Clark headquartered in Jefferson City, the regiment was distributed throughout Missouri for guard and picket duty, encountering skirmishes near Booneville, Missouri, on May 3, 1865.

The regiment moved on to Kansas City and then to Fort Leavenworth, where they assisted in quelling a mutiny in the 6th West Virginia Cavalry, which took place in July 1865 after the cavalry regiment refused orders to fight Native Americans and instead demanded to return home. For this, the 50th received an adulatory acknowledgement by Brigadier General Charles J. Stolbrand praising their "steadiness and devotion to duty". The regiment would later depart for Fort Rice in the Dakota Territory – with Col. Clark placed in command of the post – where they arrived on October 10, 1865, and were stationed until May 1866. The regiment was mustered out between April 19 and June 12, 1866.

== Casualties ==
Records vary on the number of casualties suffered by the 50th Wisconsin. An official book published in 1915 by the State of Wisconsin on its losses in the war describes one enlisted man killed in action, one officer (Note: The officer was Captain Charles H. Cox, who was shot by Private Ole Julson on July 10, 1865, onboard the Post Boy steamship on the Missouri River and died the following day.) and three enlisted men who died through accident, and 38 enlisted men who died of disease, for a total of 43 fatalities; while A Compendium of the War of Rebellion by Frederick H. Dyer describes 1 enlisted man killed in action and 1 officer and 43 enlisted men killed by disease, for a total of 45.

== Commanders ==
- John G. Clark (March 1865 – June 12, 1866) commanded the regiment for its full term of federal service.

== Notable people ==
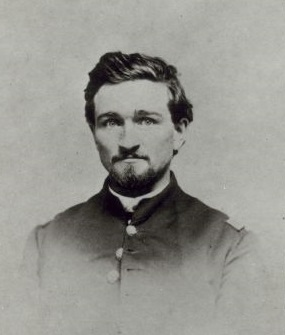
Edwin Bryant photographed during his Civil War service.

- Edwin E. Bryant was lieutenant colonel, but was detailed to a military commission. Prior to this service, he had been an officer in the 3rd Wisconsin Infantry Regiment and was a veteran of Gettysburg. After the war he served as private secretary to Governor Lucius Fairchild, was adjutant general of the Wisconsin National Guard, and was dean of the University of Wisconsin Law School.
- Charles G. Crosse was 2nd assistant surgeon. Later served as a Wisconsin legislator.
- James E. Newell was 1st lieutenant of Co. B. Later served as a Wisconsin legislator.
- John Coit Spooner was captain of Co. A. Received an honorary brevet to major. After the war became a United States senator.

== See also ==
- List of Wisconsin Civil War units
- Wisconsin in the American Civil War
