= 11th Independent Battery Wisconsin Light Artillery =

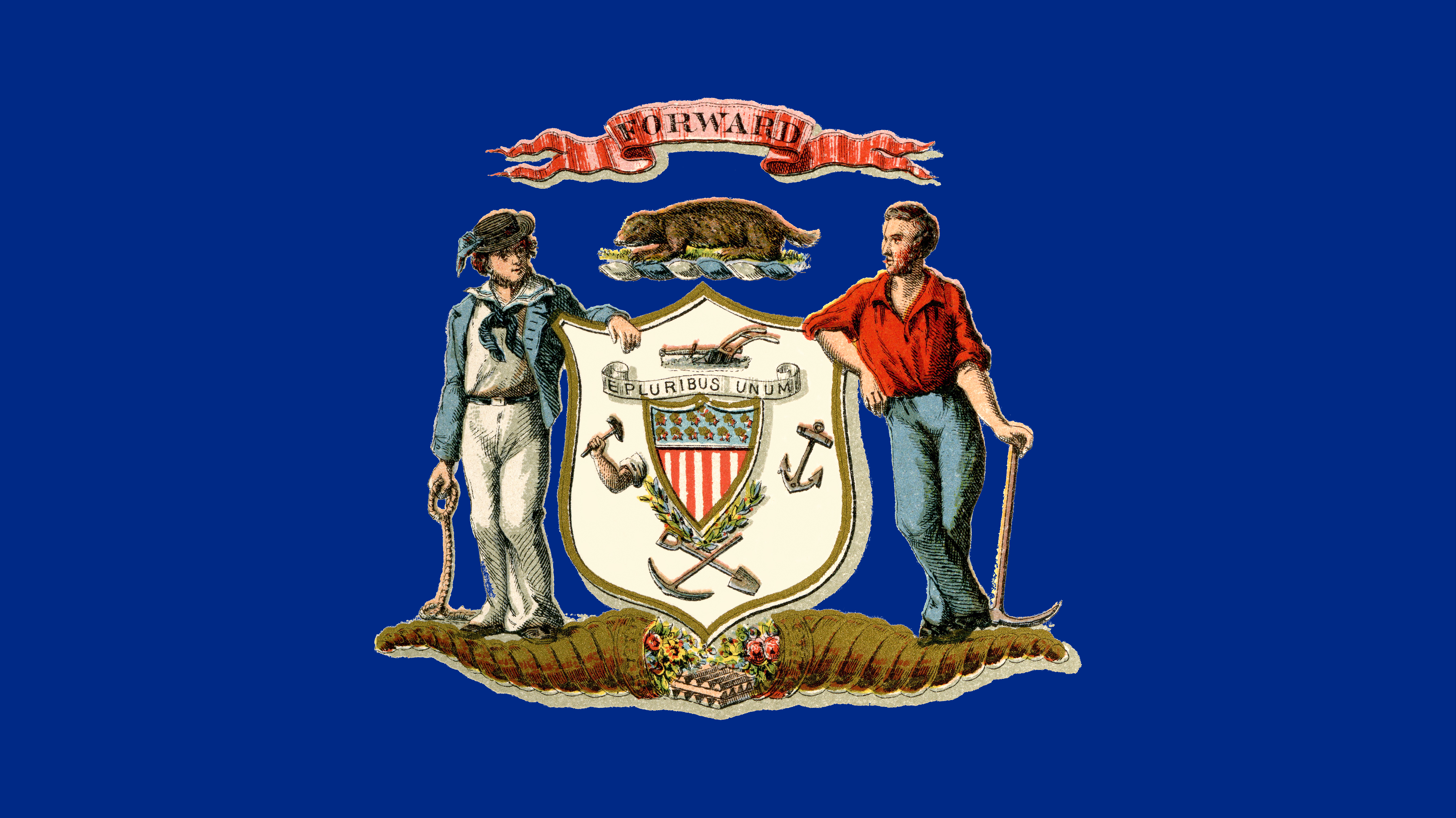
- Active: February 22, 1862 – February 1862
- Country: United States of America
- Allegiance: Union
- Branch: Artillery

The 11th Independent Battery Wisconsin Light Artillery, was an artillery battery that served in the Union Army during the American Civil War.

== Service ==
The 11th Independent Battery was mustered into service at Madison, Wisconsin, on February 22, 1862. Later in the month it was transferred to Illinois service as Battery "L," 1st Illinois Light Artillery.

== Total strength and casualties ==
The 11th Independent Battery initially recruited 87 officers and men. An additional 8 men were recruited as replacements, for a total of 95 men.

The battery suffered 3 enlisted men killed in action or died of their wounds and 2 enlisted men who died of disease or accident, for a total of 5 fatalities.

== Commanders ==
- Captain John Rourke

He went by O'Rourke and by Rourke. The Capt. John O'Rourke House in Plattsmouth, Nebraska is listed on the National Register of Historic Places.

== See also ==
- List of Wisconsin Civil War units
- Wisconsin in the American Civil War
