= 11th Wisconsin Infantry Regiment =

Union Army infantry regiment

- Flag of Wisconsin
- Active: October 18, 1861 – September 5, 1865
- Country: United States
- Allegiance: Union
- Branch: Infantry
- Size: Regiment
- Engagements: American Civil War: Battle of Port Gibson; Battle of Champion Hill; Battle of Big Black River; Siege of Vicksburg; Assault on Fort Blakeley

Commanders
- Colonel: Charles L. Harris
- Major: Jesse S. Miller

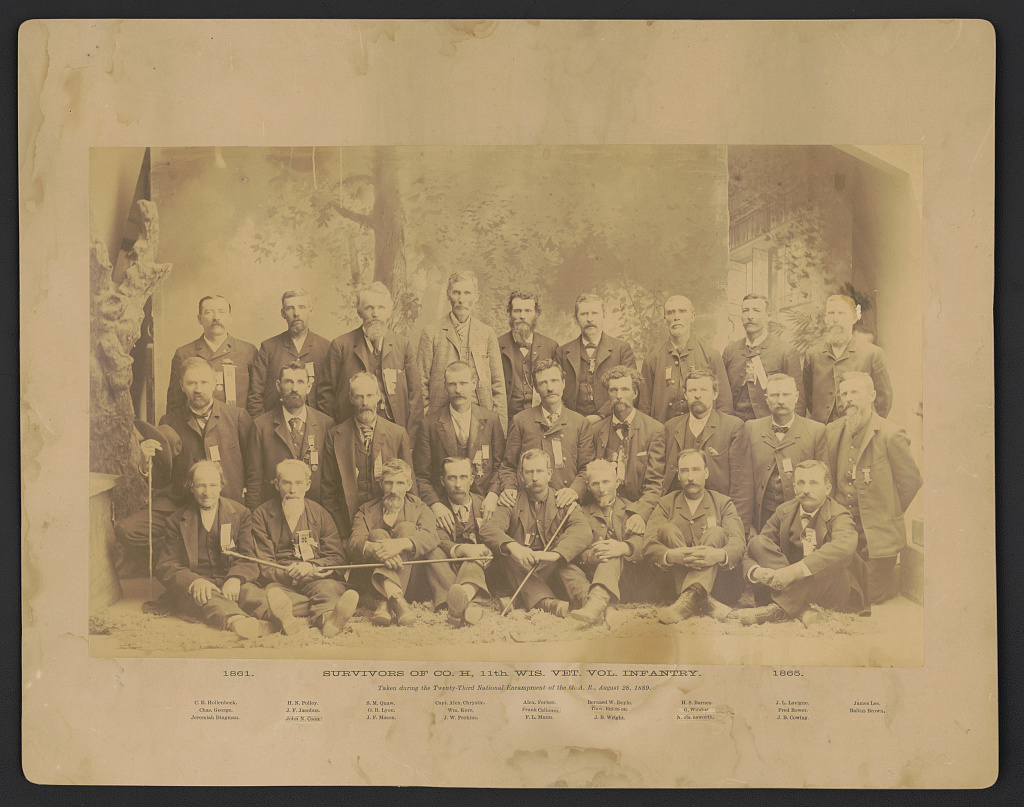
Survivors of Co. H, 11th Wis. Vet. Vol. Infantry Taken during the twenty-third national encampment of the G.A.R., August 28, 1889. From the Liljenquist Family Collection of Civil War Photographs, Prints and Photographs Division, Library of Congress

The 11th Wisconsin Infantry Regiment was an infantry regiment that served in the Union Army during the American Civil War.

== Service ==
The 11th Wisconsin was raised at Madison, Wisconsin, and mustered into Federal service October 18, 1861.

11th Wisconsin Regimental Organization
Company	Earliest Moniker	Primary Place of Recruitment	Earliest Captain
A	Watson Guards	Dane County	Daniel E. Hough †
B	Mendota Guards	Dane County	James H. Hubbard
C	Waterloo Rifles	Jefferson County and the town of Waterloo, which is part of Jefferson County and Grant County	Charles Perry
D	Richland County Plow Boys	Richland County, Dane County, and Waukesha County	Jesse S. Miller
E	Farmers Guards	Iowa County	Luther H. Whittlesey
F	Harvey Zouaves	Dane County and Sauk County	Edward R. Chase
G	Randall Zouaves	Iowa County and Dane County	Wilbur F. Pelton
H	Dixon Guard	Richland County, Columbia County and Sauk County	Alexander Chrystie
I	Fox River Zouaves	Waushara County, Green Lake County, and Florence County	Allen J. Whittier
K	Neenah Rifles	Winnebago County, Polk County, and Vilas County	Calvin J. Wheeler

Ordered to Pilot Knob, Mo., March 12, 1862, thence moved to Reeve's Station, Black River, March 23–27, and to White River April 19. March to Batesville, Ark., thence to Helena, Ark., May 25-July 13. Hill's Plantation, Cache River, July 7. Moved to Oldtown July 26 and duty there until September 20. Expedition after cotton July 30-August 4. Action at Totten's Plantation, near Oldtown, August 2 (Cos. "C," "E," "G," "H," "I" and "K"). Moved to Sugar Point September 20, thence to Pilot Knob, Mo., October 3, and duty there until November 2. Railroad guard and patrol duty at Patterson, Van Buren, West Plains and Middlebrook until March, 1863. Ordered to Helena, Ark., March 11, thence to Milliken's Bend, La. Movement on Bruinsburg and turning Grand Gulf April 25–30. Battle of Port Gibson May 1 (Reserve). Battle of Champion's Hill May 16. Big Black River May 17. Siege of Vicksburg, Miss., May 18-July 4. Assaults on Vicksburg May 19 and 22. Advance on Jackson, Miss., July 4–10. Siege of Jackson July 10–17. Ordered to Dept. of the Gulf August 13. Duty at Carrollton, Breasher City and Berwick until October. Western Louisiana Campaign October 3-November 10. Expedition to New Iberia October 3–6, and to Vermillionville Bayou October 8–30. Moved to Berwick City November 10. Expedition to Brazos Santiago, Texas, November 17–23. Duty at Matagorda Bay and Indianola until February, 1864. Regiment veteranized January, 1864, and remustered February 13. On furlough February 14-April 25. Moved to Memphis, Tenn., April 25–29. Sturgis' Expedition through Western Tennessee and Northern Mississippi May 2–9. Moved to Carrollton, La., May 11–15, thence to Brashear City May 19, and post and outpost duty at that point until February, 1865. Company "D" detached to Bayou Louis May 26, 1864; Company "E" to Tigerville May 31, 1864. Company "K" detached to Tigerville June 6; rejoined Regiment June 23. Companies "D" and "E" rejoined Regiment July 20. Expedition to Bayou Long June 30 (Cos. "A," "G" and "I"). Expedition to Grand Lake June 25 (Co. "F"). Expedition to Grand Lake July 27 (Cos. "E," "D" and "K"). Expedition to Grand River September 8 (Cos. "B" and "G") and again September 13 (Cos. "A," "C," "H" and "I"). Expedition to Grand River September 26–30. Non-veterans mustered out October 25, 1864. Expedition to Belle River October 22–24. Expedition to Bayou Portage November 17–19. Lake Fausse River November 18. Bayou La Fourche, Ash Bayou, November 18–19. Expedition from Brashear City to Bayou Sorrel January 21–22, 1865 (Co. "D"). Expedition from Brashear City to Lake Verret February 10–11 (Detachment). Moved to New Orleans, La., February 26. Campaign against Mobile and its Defenses March 17-April 12. Siege of Spanish Fort and Fort Blakely March 26-April 8. Assault and capture of Fort Blakely April 9. Occupation of Mobile April 12. March to Montgomery April 13–25 and duty there until July. Moved to Mobile July 23 and duty there until September. Mustered out September 5, 1865.

== Total enlistments and casualties ==
The 11th Wisconsin initially mustered 1,045 men and later recruited an additional 622 men, for a total of 1,667 men. The regiment lost 8 officers and 80 enlisted men killed in action or who later died of their wounds, plus another 4 officers and 253 enlisted men who died of disease, for a total of 280 fatalities.

The Regiment's officers included Angus R. McDonald (1832 - 1879) of Mazomanie, Wisconsin, a native of the isle of Eigg in Scotland's Inner Hebrides. At the time of his death, Capt. MacDonald was the last direct descendant of Alasdair Mac Mhaighstir Alasdair (c.1698 - 1770), who is widely considered, along with Sorley MacLean (1911 - 1996), to be one of the two most important writers in the history of Scottish Gaelic literature.

Sgt. Daniel B. Moore of Company E was awarded the Medal of Honor for saving Lt. McDonald's life during the Battle of Fort Blakeley on 9 April 1865.

== Commanders ==
- Colonel Charles L. Harris

== See also ==
- List of Wisconsin Civil War units
- Wisconsin in the American Civil War
- Christopher C. Wehner, The 11th Wisconsin in the Civil War: A Regimental History (McFarland, N.C., 2008)
