= 3rd Independent Battery Wisconsin Light Artillery =

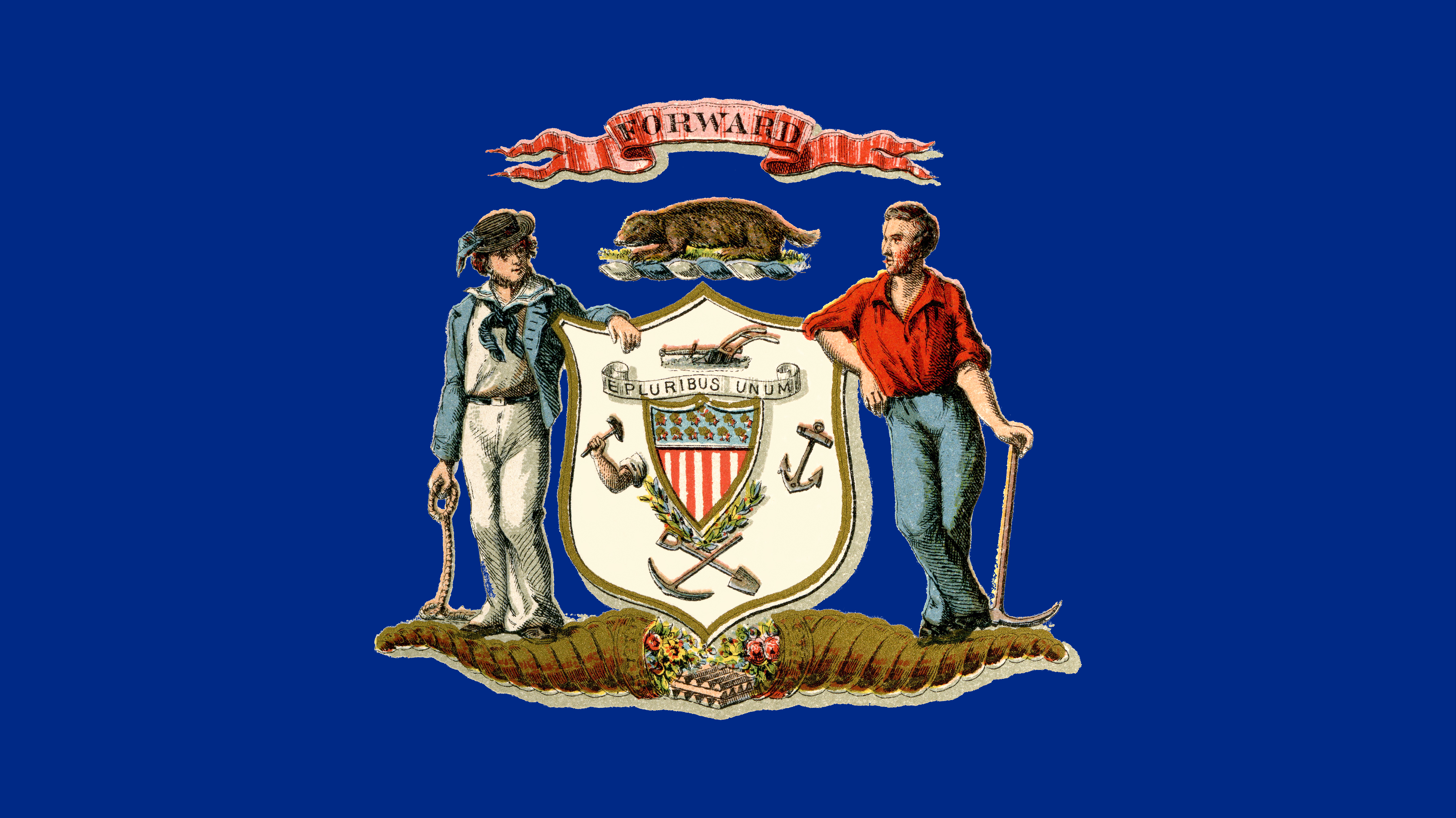
- Active: October 10, 1861, to July 20, 1865
- Country: United States
- Allegiance: Union
- Branch: Artillery
- Engagements: Siege of Corinth; Battle of Perryville; Battle of Stone's River; Battle of Chickamauga; Siege of Chattanooga

The 3rd Independent Battery Wisconsin Light Artillery , nicknamed the "Badger Battery," was an artillery battery that served in the Union Army during the American Civil War.

== Service ==
The 3rd Independent Battery was mustered into service at Racine, Wisconsin, on October 10, 1861.

The battery was mustered out on July 20, 1865.

== Total strength and casualties ==
The 3rd Independent Battery initially recruited 170 officers and men. An additional 67 men were recruited as replacements, for a total of 237 men.

The battery suffered 6 enlisted men killed in action or died of wounds and 21 enlisted men who died of disease, for a total of 27 fatalities.

== Commanders ==
- Captain Lu H. Drury

== See also ==
- List of Wisconsin Civil War units
- Wisconsin in the American Civil War
