= 2nd Independent Battery Wisconsin Light Artillery =

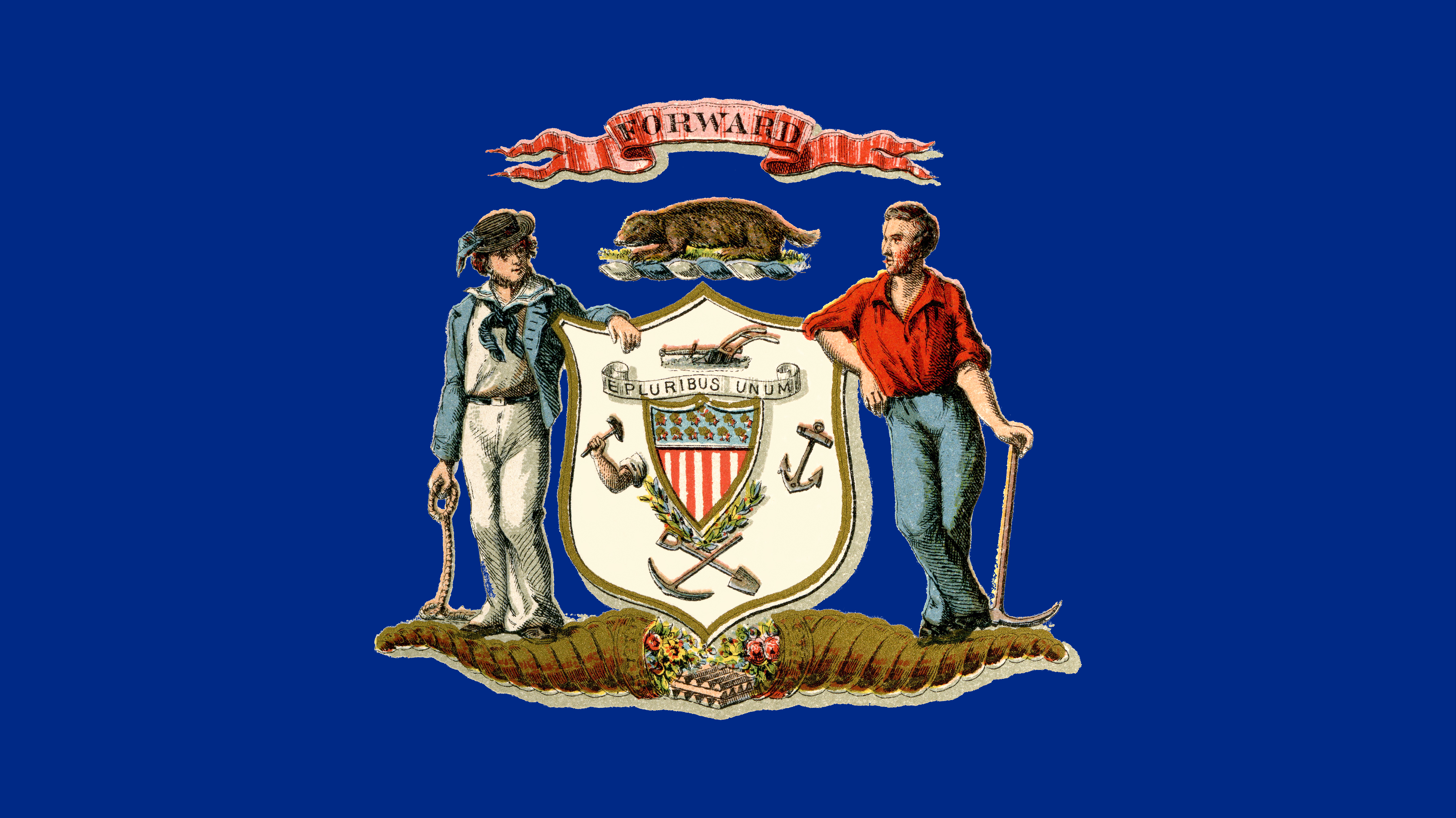
- Active: October 10, 1861, to July 10, 1865
- Country: United States
- Allegiance: Union
- Branch: Artillery
- Type: Artillery
- Size: 195 (Total enrollment)
- Nickname: "Washington Battery"
- Engagements: Battle of Deserted House; Siege of Suffolk; Dix's Peninsula Campaign

The 2nd Independent Battery Wisconsin Light Artillery also known as the "Washington Battery" was an artillery battery that served in the Union Army during the American Civil War.

== Service ==
The 2nd Independent Battery was mustered into service at Racine, Wisconsin, on October 10, 1861 and left state on January 21, 1862, it was ordered to Baltimore and would conduct Garrison duty on Fort Monroe and Camp Hamilton, Virginia.

January 10, the battery moved to Suffolk, Virginia, and on January 30, would take part in the Battle of Deserted House. On April 11-May 4, they would participate in the Siege of Suffolk, specifically at Norfleet House, After the battle, on May 6, they moved to Portsmouth, Virginia and then to West Point.

From July 24-July 7, the battery would take part in Dix's Peninsula Campaign, where they were ordered to hold Yorktown, Virginia until July 20, when they moved to Point Lookout, Maryland on January 20, to serve as guards for prisoners until they were mustered out.

The battery was mustered out on July 10, 1865.

== Total strength and casualties ==
The 2nd Independent Battery initially recruited 153 officers and men. An additional 42 men were recruited as replacements, for a total of 195 men.

The regiment suffered 12 enlisted men who died of disease, for a total of 12 fatalities.

== Commanders ==
- Captain Ernst F. Herzberg
- Captain Charles Beger - Mustered out with the regiment

== See also ==
- List of Wisconsin Civil War units
- Wisconsin in the American Civil War
