= 4th Independent Battery Wisconsin Light Artillery =

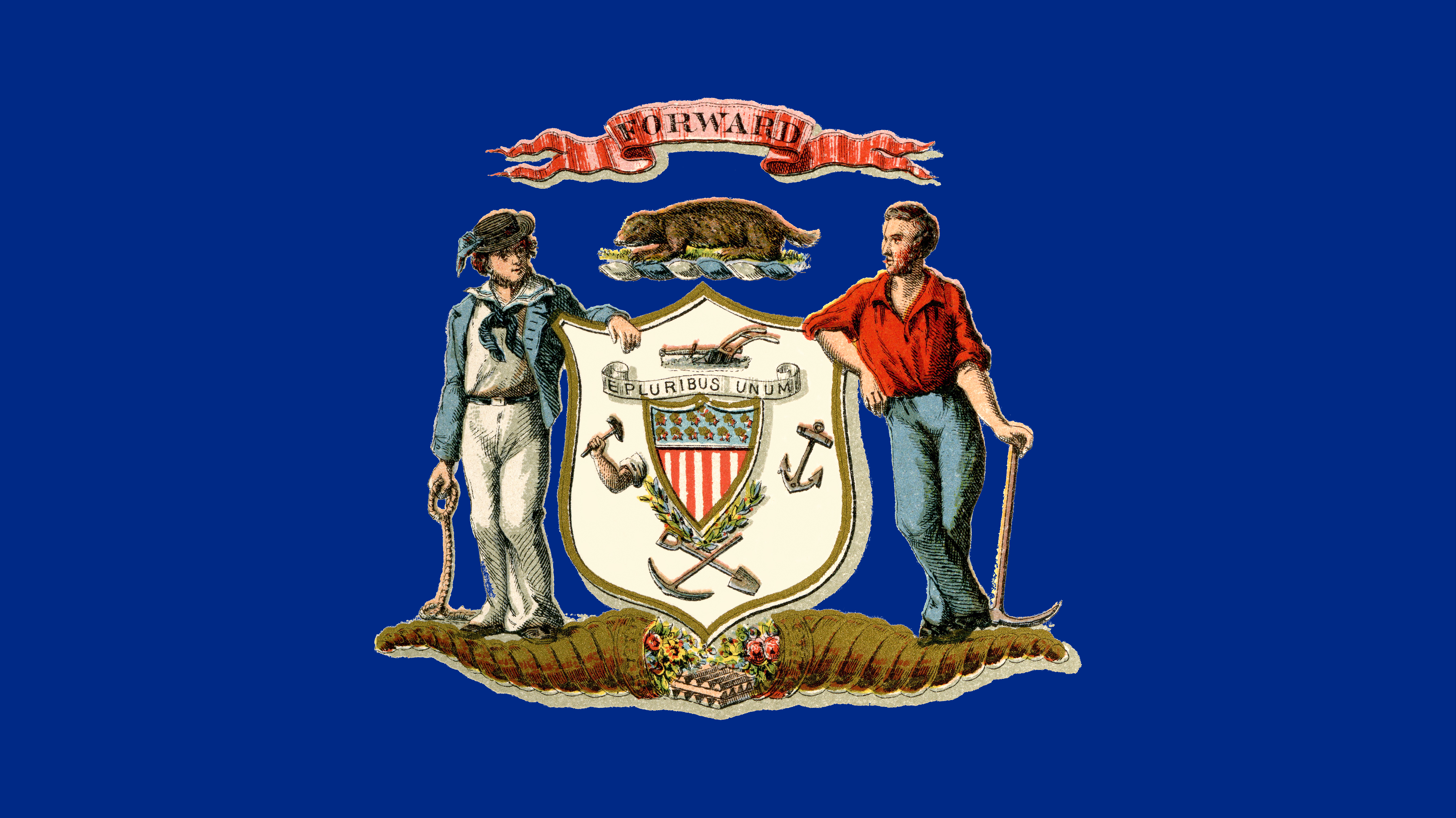
- Active: October 10, 1861, to July 3, 1865
- Country: United States
- Allegiance: Union
- Branch: Artillery
- Engagements: Battle of Drewry's Bluff; Siege of Petersburg; Battle of New Market Heights; Battle of Fair Oaks; Battle of Five Forks

The 4th Independent Battery Wisconsin Light Artillery was an artillery battery that served in the Union Army during the American Civil War.

== Service ==
The 4th Independent Battery was mustered into service at Racine, Wisconsin, on October 10, 1861.

The battery was mustered out on July 3, 1865.

== Total strength and casualties ==
The 4th Independent Battery initially recruited 151 officers and men. An additional 100 men were recruited as replacements, for a total of 251 men.

The battery suffered 3 enlisted men killed in action or died of wounds and 22 enlisted men who died of disease, for a total of 25 fatalities.

== Commanders ==
- Captain John F. Vallee
- Captain George B. Easterly
- Captain Dorman L. Noggle

== Notable people ==
- William Penn Powers, son of David J. Powers, was a first lieutenant. He was previously enlisted in the 1st Wisconsin Heavy Artillery Regiment.

== See also ==
- List of Wisconsin Civil War units
- Wisconsin in the American Civil War
