= James Pond (Medal of Honor) =

United States Army Medal of Honor recipient

James B. Pond
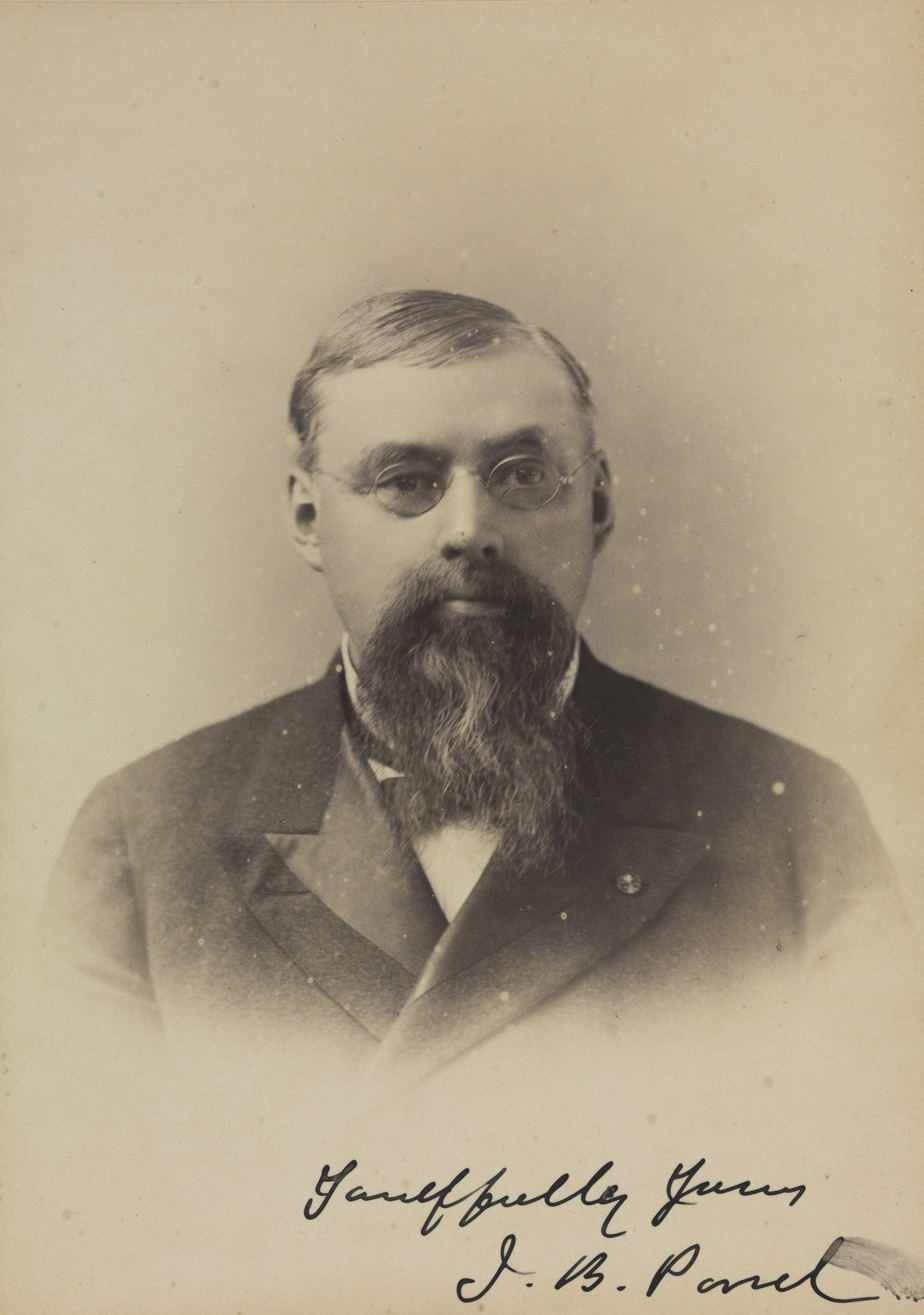
- Born: June 11, 1838; Cuba, New York, US
- Died: June 21, 1903 (aged 65); Jersey City, New Jersey, US
- Burial place: Woodlawn Cemetery; The Bronx, New York, US
- Relatives: George F. Pond (brother)
- Military career
- Allegiance: United States of America; Union
- Branch: (United States) Union Army
- Service years: 1861 - 1865
- Rank: Major
- Unit: 3rd Wisconsin Volunteer Cavalry Regiment
- Conflicts: American Civil War: Battle of Baxter Springs
- Awards: Medal of Honor

James Burton Pond (June 11, 1838 – June 21, 1903) was an abolitionist and an officer in the Union Army during the American Civil War. For his actions during the Battle of Baxter Springs, he received the Medal of Honor. Returning to civilian life, he became a successful lecture manager whose clients included Mark Twain, Winston Churchill, and Henry Morton Stanley.

== Early life ==
Pond was born on June 11, 1838, in Cuba, New York, though his official residence was listed as Janesville, Wisconsin. The family moved, first to Illinois in 1844, then to Wisconsin in 1847.

Pond became a strong abolitionist. He was a member of the Underground Railroad, helping escaped slaves reach freedom and reportedly riding with John Brown for a time in the mid-1850s.

He studied printing and published The Journal in Markesan, Wisconsin, between 1860 and 1861.

== Civil War ==
In November 1861, Pond was commissioned as a lieutenant in the 3rd Wisconsin Volunteer Cavalry Regiment. At the Battle of Baxter Springs, he fought against the notorious Confederate guerrilla leader William Quantrill and his Raiders. For his heroism in that action, he was awarded the Medal of Honor on March 30, 1898. By the time he mustered out in September 1865, he had been promoted to the rank of major. After the war, he was elected as a companion of the New York Commandery of the Military Order of the Loyal Legion of the United States.

=== Medal of Honor citation ===
For extraordinary heroism on 6 October 1863, while serving with Company C, 3d Wisconsin Cavalry, in action at Baxter Springs, Kansas. While in command of two companies of Cavalry, First Lieutenant Pond was surprised and attacked by several times his own number of guerrillas, but gallantly rallied his men, and after a severe struggle drove the enemy outside the fortifications. First Lieutenant Pond then went outside the works and, alone and unaided, fired a howitzer three times, throwing the enemy into confusion and causing him to retire.

== Post-war career ==
After the war, he tried his hand at various business enterprises in the western United States.

In Salt Lake City, he was asked to manage a national lecture tour for Ann Eliza Young, the 52nd wife of Brigham Young, who had become disillusioned with her husband. She eventually divorced Young and spoke out against him, the LDS Church, and polygamy.

In 1874, Pond purchased the Lyceum Theatre Lecture Bureau and embarked on a career managing speakers. In 1879, he moved his main office to New York City. In addition to Mark Twain's 1884–85 tour, Pond managed the North American stage of the worldwide lecture tour the author undertook in 1895–96 to pay off his enormous debts. He also promoted Winston Churchill's first American tour, though the two had a falling out and Churchill referred to Pond as "a vulgar Yankee impresario." Explorer and journalist Henry Morton Stanley earned $60,000 (~$1.91 million in 2024) for an 1890–91 U.S. tour set up by Pond. Other clients included P. T. Barnum, Booker T. Washington, Frederick Douglass, Arthur Conan Doyle, Ellen Terry, and Henry Ward Beecher. Pond wrote a book entitled Eccentricities of Genius (1900), in which he reminisced about his experiences with his famous clients.

== Personal life ==
Pond's first wife, the former Ann Frances Lynch, died in 1871. He married Martha Glass of Jersey City in 1880.

Three of his brothers, George, Homer, and Philip, also fought for the Union in the Civil War. George F. Pond was awarded the Medal of Honor as well, for a later action.

Pond died due primarily to an ulcer on his right foot that turned gangrenous. All seemed well after a successful amputation below the knee, but Pond took a turn for the worse and died of heart failure on June 21, 1903. He was survived by his wife, a son, and a daughter. He was buried in Woodlawn Cemetery, The Bronx, New York. His grave can be found in section 70, lawn plot, lot 6393 NW 1/4.

After his death, his son James B. Pond Jr. took over the business.

== In film ==
He was played in the 1944 movie The Adventures of Mark Twain by Donald Crisp.

== See also ==
- List of American Civil War Medal of Honor recipients: M–P
