= 44th Wisconsin Infantry Regiment =

Union Army infantry regiment

- Flag of Wisconsin
- Active: October 1864 – August 28, 1865
- Country: United States
- Allegiance: Union
- Branch: Infantry
- Size: Regiment
- Engagements: American Civil War: Battle of Nashville

Commanders
- Colonel: George G. Symes
- Lt. Col.: Oliver C. Bissell

The 44th Wisconsin Infantry Regiment was a volunteer infantry regiment that served in the Union Army during the American Civil War.

== Service ==
The 44th Wisconsin was organized at Madison, Wisconsin, and mustered into Federal service by companies between October and November 1864. The first five companies of the regiment were rushed to Nashville as a battalion under the command of Lieutenant Colonel Oliver C. Bissell, in November 1864, to assist in the defense of the Battle of Nashville. The remaining companies arrived in February 1865.

The regiment was mustered out on August 28, 1865.

== Casualties ==
The 44th Wisconsin suffered 1 officer and 57 enlisted men who died of disease, for a total of 58 fatalities.

== Commanders ==
- Colonel George G. Symes (July 1864 – August 28, 1865) superintended the organization of the regiment and took command of the full regiment when he brought the remaining companies to meet the advance battalion in February 1865. Before being appointed colonel, he served as a private in the 2nd Wisconsin Infantry Regiment and was wounded at the First Battle of Bull Run, after recovering he served as adjutant and later captain of Co. F in the 25th Wisconsin Infantry Regiment. After the war he moved to Colorado and became a U.S. congressman from that state.
  - Lt. Colonel Oliver C. Bissell (November 30, 1864 – February 1865) commanded the advance battalion of the regiment that went into service first in order to rapidly deploy to the Battle of Nashville.

== Notable people ==
- Samuel Abbott Ferrin was 1st assistant surgeon after previously serving as a hospital steward with the 32nd Wisconsin Infantry Regiment. After the war he became a Wisconsin state legislator.

== See also ==
- List of Wisconsin Civil War units
- Wisconsin in the American Civil War
