= 8th Independent Battery Wisconsin Light Artillery =

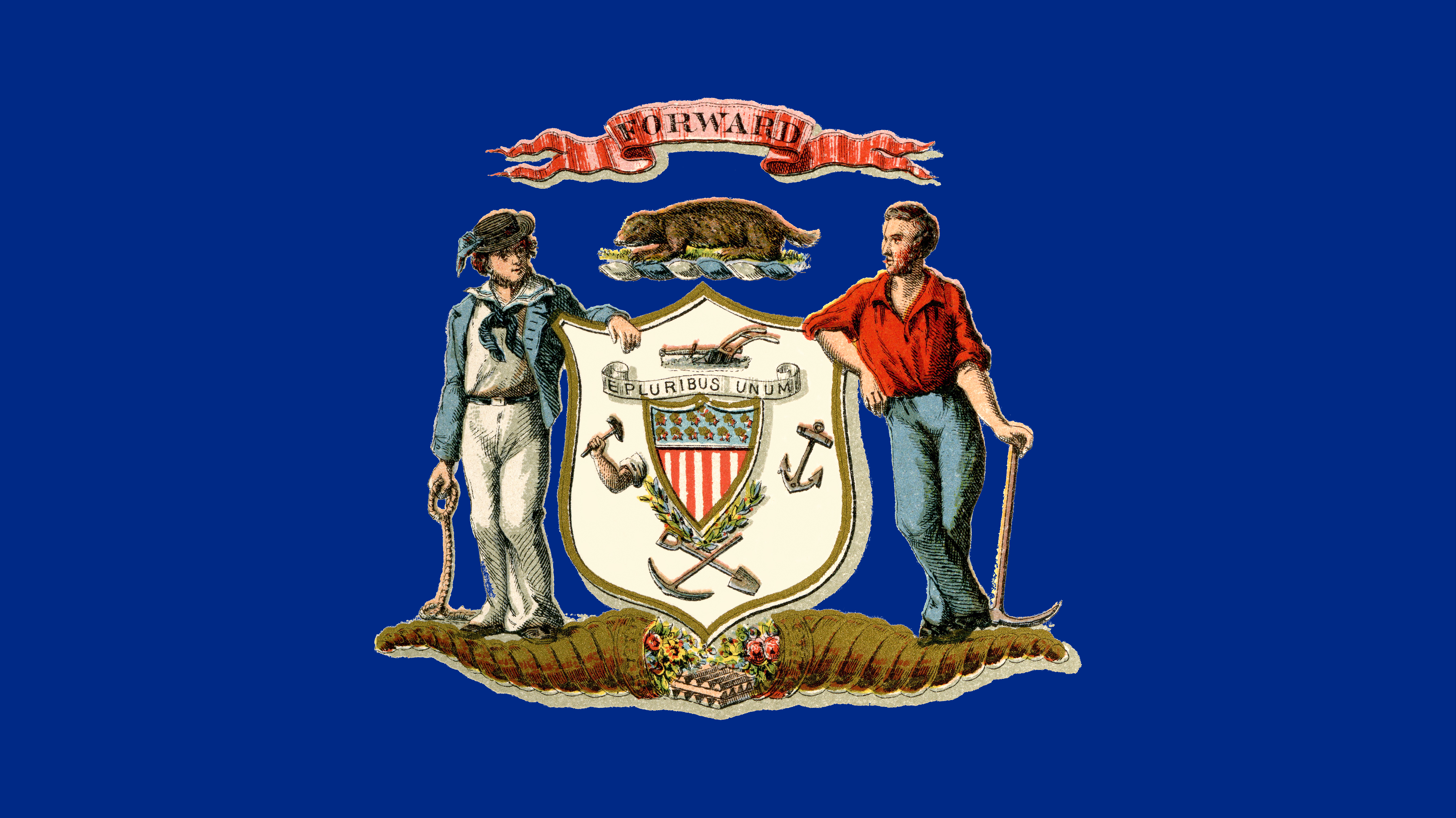
- Active: January 8, 1862, to August 10, 1865
- Country: United States
- Allegiance: Union
- Branch: Artillery
- Engagements: Battle of Iuka; Battle of Corinth; Battle of Perryville; Battle of Stone's River; Battle of Chickamauga; Siege of Chattanooga

The 8th Independent Battery Wisconsin Light Artillery, nicknamed the "Lyons' Pinery Battery," was an artillery battery that served in the Union Army during the American Civil War.

== Service ==
The 8th Independent Battery was mustered into service at Racine, Wisconsin, on January 8, 1862.

The battery was mustered out on August 10, 1865.

== Total strength and casualties ==
The 8th Independent Battery initially recruited 161 officers and men. An additional 102 men were recruited as replacements, for a total of 263 men.

The battery suffered 1 officer and 1 enlisted man killed in action or died of wounds and 26 enlisted men who died of disease, for a total of 28 fatalities.

== Commanders ==
- Captain Stephen J. Carpenter
- Captain Henry E. Stiles

== See also ==
- List of Wisconsin Civil War units
- Wisconsin in the American Civil War
