= 12th Independent Battery, Wisconsin Light Artillery =

Artillery battery

12th Independent Battery, Wisconsin Light Artillery, U.S. Volunteers
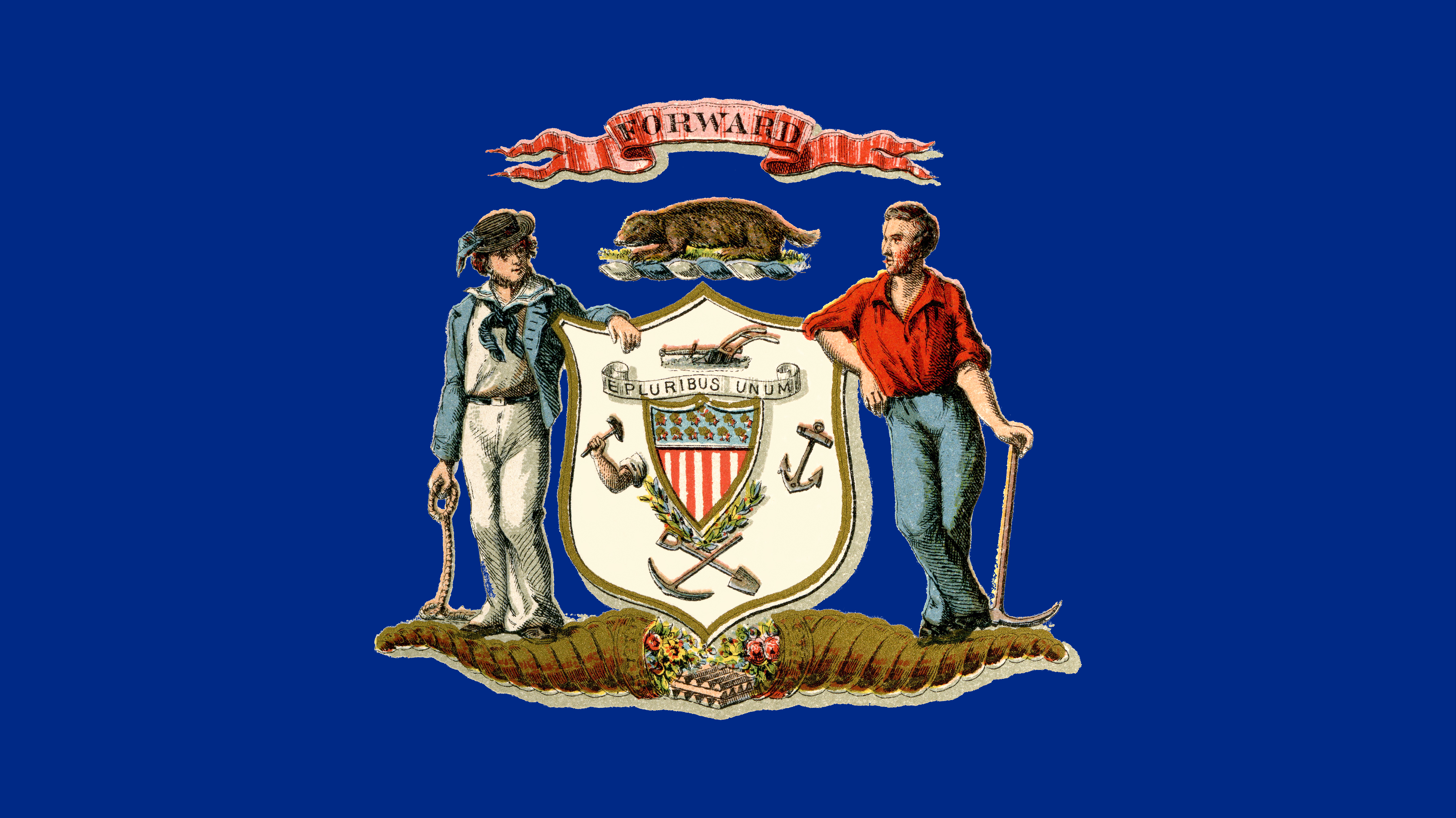
- Active: February and March, 1862 to June 26, 1865
- Country: United States
- Allegiance: Union
- Branch: Artillery
- Engagements: siege of Corinth; Battle of Iuka; Battle of Port Gibson; Battle of Raymond; Battle of Jackson; Battle of Champion Hill; Siege of Vicksburg; Battle of Allatoona; Battle of Bentonville

The 12th Independent Battery, Wisconsin Light Artillery, was an artillery battery that served in the Union Army during the American Civil War.

== Service ==
The 12th Independent Battery was mustered into service at St. Louis, Missouri, in February, 1862 as a part of a Missouri light artillery regiment under the authority of Governor Henry but was transferred to Wisconsin state service.

The battery was mustered out on June 26, 1865.

== Total strength and casualties ==
The 12th Independent Battery initially recruited 99 officers and men. An additional 212 men were recruited as replacements, for a total of 311 men.

The battery suffered 1 officer and 10 enlisted men killed in action or died of wounds, and 23 enlisted men who died of disease, for a total of 34 fatalities.

Most of the battle losses occurred at the Battle of Allatoona Pass, October 5, 1864, where the 12th was the only Union artillery present. First Lieutenant Marcus Amsden, who commanded the battery in this fight, fell mortally wounded; Sergeant Sylvester Bartow, Corporal Alva P. Hamilton, and Private David C. Davey were killed in action, and Privates Charles C. Baker, Joseph W. Chase, and Samuel H. Doolittle also died of their wounds.

== Commanders ==
- Captain William A. Pile - March 1, 1862 - July 18, 1862, when his commission was revoked
- Captain William Zickerick - July 18, 1862 - June 7, 1865

== See also ==
- List of Wisconsin Civil War units
- Wisconsin in the American Civil War
