= Robert H. DeLap =

American politician

Robert Hughes DeLap (September 26, 1846 – October 30, 1922) was a member of the Wisconsin State Assembly.

== Biography ==
DeLap was born on September 26, 1846, in what is now Green County, Wisconsin. During the American Civil War, he served with the 33rd Wisconsin Volunteer Infantry Regiment of the Union Army. DeLap's places of residence include Viroqua (town), Wisconsin, Viola, Wisconsin and Richland Center, Wisconsin. He worked as a physician. DeLap died on October 30, 1922.

== Political career ==
DeLap was elected to the Assembly in 1888. Additionally, he was a member of the county board of Richland County, Wisconsin and a justice of the peace. He was a Republican. He served as a presidential elector in 1908.
