= Charles L. Harris (general) =

19th century American politician

Member of the Nebraska Senate from the Boone County district
- In office January 2, 1883 – January 6, 1885
- Preceded by: B. K. Smith

Member of the Wisconsin State Assembly from the Door–Kewaunee district
- In office January 3, 1870 – January 2, 1871
- Preceded by: John R. McDonald
- Succeeded by: Joseph McCormick

Personal details
- Born: August 24, 1834 Bridgeton, New Jersey, U.S.
- Died: October 11, 1910 (aged 76) Omaha, Nebraska, U.S.
- Cause of death: Car accident
- Resting place: Forest Lawn Memorial Park, Omaha, Nebraska
- Party: Republican

Military service
- Allegiance: United States
- Branch/service: United States Volunteers; Union Army
- Years of service: 1861–1865
- Rank: Colonel, USV; Brevet Brig. General, USV
- Unit: 1st Reg. Wis. Vol. Infantry
- Commands: 11th Reg. Wis. Vol. Infantry
- Battles/wars: American Civil War

Charles Loper Harris (August 24, 1834 – October 11, 1910) was an American lawyer, Republican politician, and pioneer of Wisconsin and Nebraska. He served one term each in the Wisconsin State Assembly and the Nebraska Senate. He served as a Union Army officer through the American Civil War and earned an honorary brevet to the rank of brigadier general.

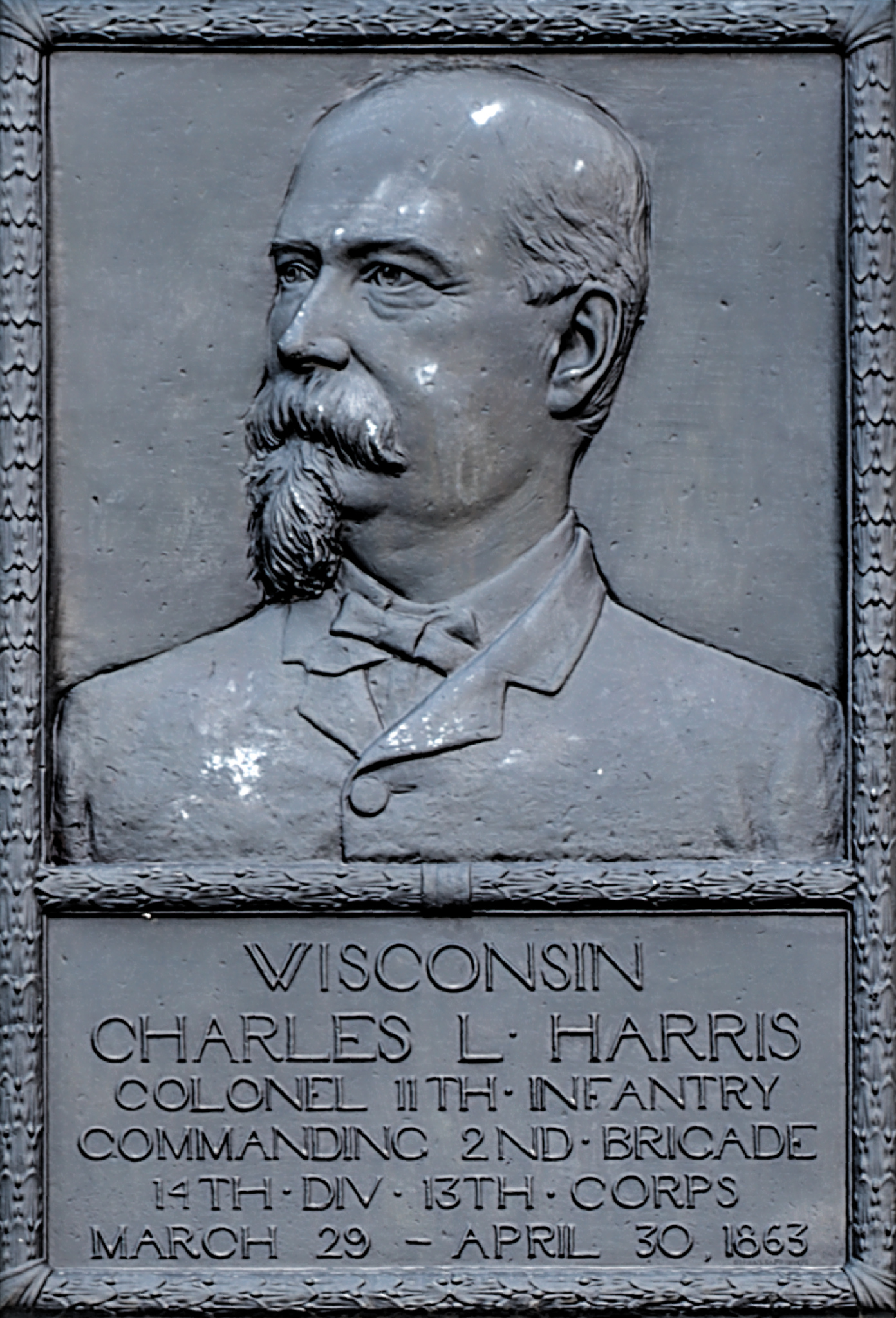
Relief portrait by Theo Alice Ruggles Kitson at Vicksburg National Military Park

== Biography ==
Charles Loper Harris was born on August 24, 1834, in Bridgeton, New Jersey. Later, he moved to Madison, Wisconsin. Harris later moved again, this time to Cedar County, Nebraska. On October 11, 1910, Harris died at his home in Omaha, Nebraska, from injuries sustained in an automobile accident. He was married with two children.

== Military career ==
Harris was an alumnus, although not a graduate, of the United States Military Academy. He was a member of the class of 1857, but he left after his first year when found deficient in mathematics. Instead of a career in the military, he chose to study law. After the breakout of the American Civil War, he joined the Union Army and was assigned to the 1st Wisconsin Infantry Regiment. Soon after, he was promoted to colonel and given command of the 11th Wisconsin Infantry Regiment. Harris and the regiment later took part in the Battle of Cotton Plant, where he sustained a severe wound and afterwards had to take a medical leave. After his return, Harris was given command of brigade operations in and around St. Louis, Missouri.

In 1863, he and the 11th were attached to XIX Corps under the command of future Speaker of the U.S. House of Representatives Nathaniel P. Banks. Harris then took part in the Battle of Port Gibson and the Red River Campaign. The 11th was re-assigned to XVI Corps in 1864. Harris was mustered out of the volunteers on September 4, 1865. On January 13, 1866, President Andrew Johnson nominated Harris for appointment to the grade of brevet brigadier general of volunteers to rank from March 13, 1865, and the United States Senate confirmed the appointment on March 12, 1866.

== Political career ==
Harris was hired by the Wisconsin State Assembly as sergeant-at-arms for the 1868 session of the Legislature. He subsequently was elected to the Assembly from Door County, Wisconsin, in 1869. He was a member of the Nebraska State Senate in 1883.

Military offices
Regiment established	Command of the 11th Wisconsin Infantry Regiment; October 18, 1861 – September 5, 1865	Regiment abolished
Wisconsin State Assembly
Preceded by John R. McDonald	Member of the Wisconsin State Assembly from the Door–Kewaunee district January 3, 1870 – January 2, 1871	Succeeded by Joseph McCormick
