= 9th Independent Battery Wisconsin Light Artillery =

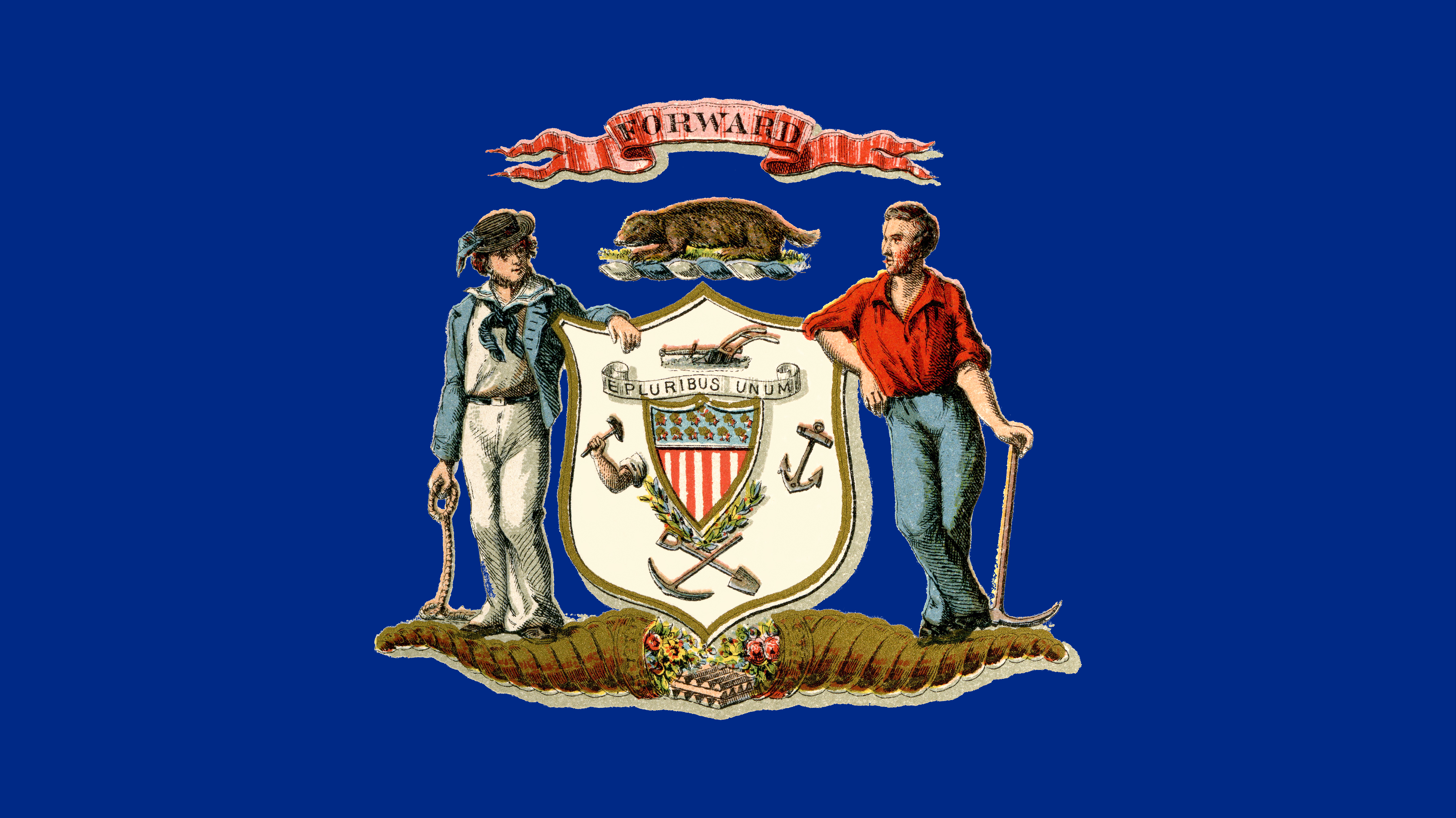
- Active: January 27, 1862, to September 30, 1865
- Country: United States
- Allegiance: Union
- Branch: Artillery
- Engagements: Battle of Byram's Ford; Battle of Westport; Battle of Mine Creek; Battle of Marmiton River

The 9th Independent Battery Wisconsin Light Artillery was an artillery battery that served in the Union Army during the American Civil War. It was often referred to as "Lyons' Pinery Battery".

== Service ==
The battery was organized at Burlington, Wisconsin and mustered in for three years on January 27, 1862, under the command of Captain Cyrus H. Johnson. It was mustered out on September 30, 1865, at Fort Leavenworth, Kansas.

== Detailed service ==
Moved to St. Louis, Missouri, March 18–19, then to Fort Leavenworth, Kansas, April 3. March to Denver City, Colorado Territory, via Fort Kearney and Julesburg, April 26-June 2. Right Section moved to Fort Union, New Mexico Territory, June 3. Left Section moved to Fort Larned June 15 and garrison duty there until December 1864. Right Section moved to Colorado Territory July 5, 1862, and duty there with Center Section until April 26, 1864, then moved to Council Grove, Kansas, April 26-May 18, and duty there until August 1864. Engaged in escorting trains and U.S. mail coaches on the Santa Fe Trail. Moved to Fort Riley, Kansas, August. 1864. Action at Smoky Hill Court House May 16, 1864. Defense of Fort Larned July 17, 18, and 19, 1863 (Left Section). Curtis' Campaign against Price in Missouri and Arkansas October 1864. Big Blue and State Line October 22. Westport October 23. Engagement on the Marmiton (or Battle of Charlot) October 25. Mine Creek, Little Osage River, October 25. Battery consolidated at Fort Leavenworth, Kansas, December 1864. Veteran battery organized January 27, 1865. One section ordered to Fort Scott March 26, and duty there until June 18, then moved to Fort Riley and Fort Zarah.

== Casualties ==
The battery lost a total of 6 enlisted men during service, all due to disease.

== Commanders ==
- Captain Cyrus H. Johnson
- Captain James H. Dodge

== See also ==
- List of Wisconsin Civil War Units
- Wisconsin in the American Civil War
