= 52nd Wisconsin Infantry Regiment =

Union Army infantry regiment

- Flag of Wisconsin
- Active: April 1865 – June 28, 1865
- Country: United States
- Allegiance: Union
- Branch: Infantry
- Size: Regiment
- Engagements: American Civil War

Commanders
- Lt. Colonel: Hiram J. Lewis

The 52nd Wisconsin Infantry Regiment was a volunteer infantry regiment that served in the Union Army near the end of the American Civil War.

== Service ==
The regiment was organized at Madison, Wisconsin, but only five companies were raised. Those five companies were mustered as a battalion in April 1865 under the command of Lieutenant Colonel Hiram J. Lewis, and sent to St. Louis, Missouri. They were then sent to Holden, Missouri, to guard workmen on the Pacific Railroad until June 21. The battalion was mustered out on June 28, 1865. During its service the battalion lost nine men to disease.

== Commanders ==
- Lt. Colonel Hiram J. Lewis (April 1865 – June 24, 1865) commanded the battalion for its full term of federal service.

== Notable people ==
- William C. Webb was commissioned colonel for the regiment, but since the regiment did not reach full strength, he was never mustered. He had previously served as quartermaster of the 37th Wisconsin Infantry Regiment. After the war he served as a Kansas state legislator and judge.

== See also ==
- List of Wisconsin Civil War units
- Wisconsin in the American Civil War
