= Frederick Moskowitt =

American politician

Frederick Moskowitt, sometimes spelled Moskowitz or Muskowitz, (February 7, 1821 – ?) was an American gardener and farmer from the Town of Milwaukee, Wisconsin who served intermittently in the Wisconsin State Assembly for a total of five terms over a period from 1855 to 1878, under three different party labels: Democratic, Reform, and Liberal Republican.

== Background ==
Moscowitt was born in Erfurt, Kingdom of Prussia on February 7, 1821. He received a common school education, and became a gardener and farmer by trade. He immigrated to the United States, and settled in New Jersey as of July 24, 1837, but moved to Wisconsin in 1841, settling in Milwaukee County.

On May 25, 1852, he married Elisabeth Schleifer of "Cedarburgh".

== Public office and service ==
He held various local offices, served one-year terms as a Democratic member of the Assembly in 1855, and again in 1857, was succeeded in 1858 by fellow Democrat Michael Hanrahan, and returned in 1859 from the 7th Milwaukee County Assembly district (the Towns of Milwaukee and Granville); was an Indian agent in 1857 and 1858. In 1860 he was succeeded by Patrick Dockry, also a Democrat.

He served in the Assembly once more in 1875, being elected as a Liberal Republican; but was not a candidate for re-election and was succeeded by Republican F. A. Zautcke. Zautcke did not run for re-election, and Moskowitt was again elected in 1877, receiving 632 votes against 586 for Republican Judson G. Hart, this time as a "Liberal Democrat" (the Liberal Reform coalition having collapsed by this time).
