= George F. Pond =

U.S. Medal of Honor Recipient

- Born: October 5, 1844; Libertyville, Illinois, U.S.
- Died: June 21, 1911 (aged 66); Fort Scott, Kansas, U.S.
- Burial place: Evergreen Cemetery, Fort Scott, Kansas
- Relatives: James Pond (brother)
- Military career
- Allegiance: United States of America; Union
- Branch: United States Army; Union Army
- Service years: 1861–1865
- Rank: Private
- Unit: 3rd Wisconsin Volunteer Cavalry Regiment
- Conflicts: American Civil War
- Awards: Medal of Honor

George F. Pond (October 5, 1844 – June 21, 1911) served in the Union Army during the American Civil War. He received the Medal of Honor.

Pond was born on October 5, 1844, in Libertyville, Illinois, although his official residence was listed as Fairwater, Wisconsin. He was the brother of fellow Medal of Honor recipient James Pond. He died June 21, 1911 and is buried in Evergreen Cemetery Fort Scott, Kansas. His grave can be found in section 4.

== Medal of Honor citation ==
Citation:

For extraordinary heroism on 15 May 1864, while serving with Company C, 3d Wisconsin Cavalry, in action at Drywood, Kansas. With two companions, Private Pond attacked a greatly superior force of guerrillas, routed them, and rescued several prisoners.

== See also ==
- List of Medal of Honor recipients
- List of American Civil War Medal of Honor recipients: M–P
