= Fernando C. Kiser =

American politician

Fernando Clayton Kiser (also Keiser, Kizer; April 27, 1832 – April 27, 1916) was an American lawyer and member of the Wisconsin State Assembly. He served in the Union Army during the American Civil War.

== Biography ==
Kiser was born in 1832 in Pennsylvania. He attended Wyoming Seminary. During the American Civil War, Kizer enlisted with the 3rd Wisconsin Volunteer Cavalry Regiment of the Union Army. He would reach the rank of captain. Engagements he took part in include the Battle of Cane Hill and the Battle of Prairie Grove.

== Assembly career ==
Kiser was a member of the Assembly during the 1889 and 1891 sessions. He was a Republican.
