= 5th Independent Battery Wisconsin Light Artillery =

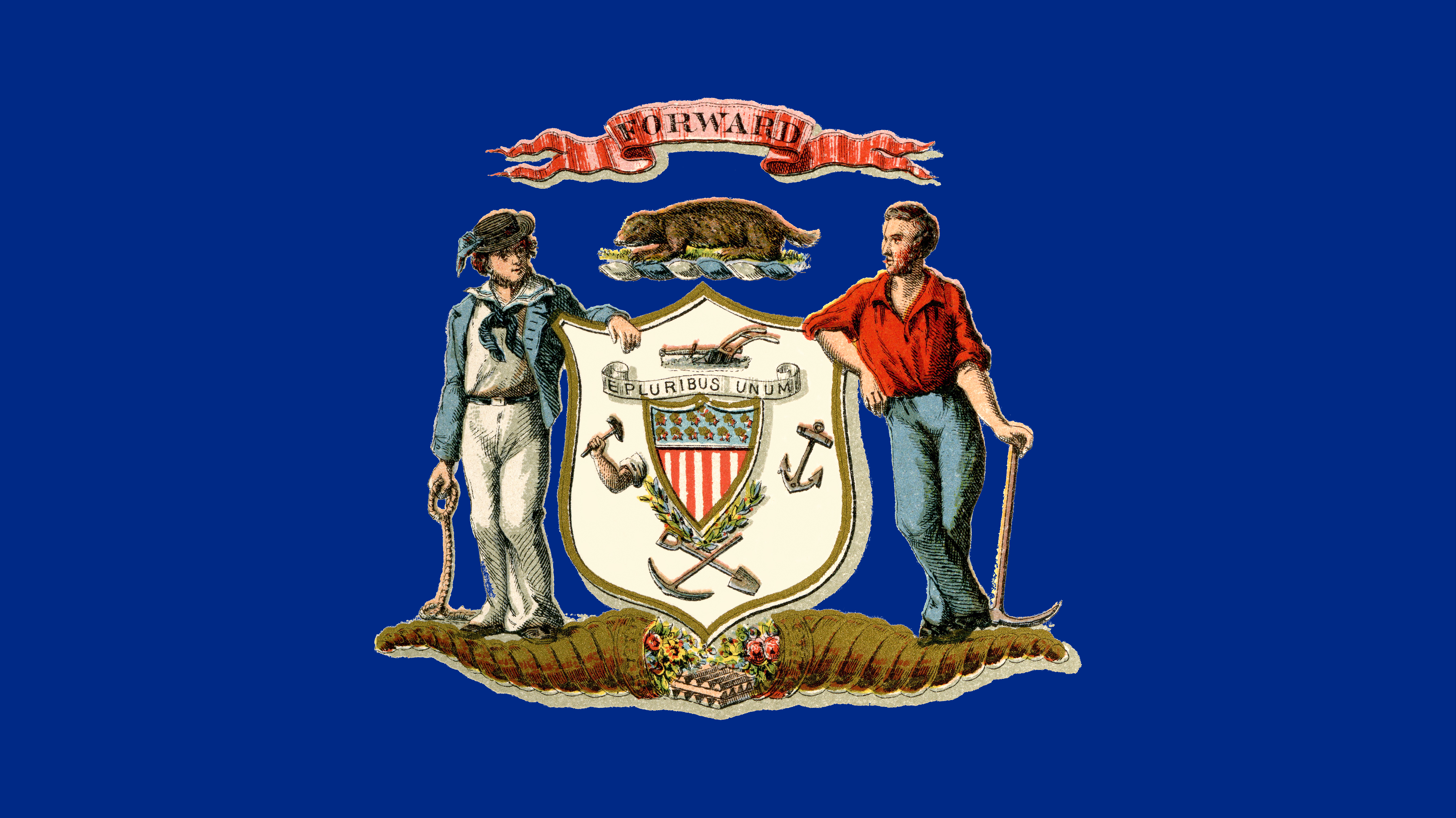
- Active: October 10, 1861, to June 6, 1865
- Country: United States
- Allegiance: Union
- Branch: Artillery
- Engagements: Siege of Corinth; Battle of Perryville; Battle of Stone's River; Battle of Chickamauga; Siege of Chattanooga; Battle of Bentonville

The 5th Independent Battery Wisconsin Light Artillery was an artillery battery that served in the Union Army during the American Civil War.

== Service ==
The 5th Independent Battery was mustered into service at Racine, Wisconsin, on October 10, 1861.

The battery was mustered out on June 6, 1865.

== Total strength and casualties ==
The 5th Independent Battery initially recruited 155 officers and men. An additional 70 men were recruited as replacements, for a total of 225 men.

The battery suffered 1 officer and 5 enlisted men killed in action or died of wounds and 1 officer and 18 enlisted men who died of disease, for a total of 25 fatalities.

== Commanders ==
- Captain Oscar F. Pinney
- Captain Charles B. Humphrey
- Captain George Q. Gardner
- Captain Joseph McKnight

== See also ==
- List of Wisconsin Civil War units
- Wisconsin in the American Civil War
