= Jonathan Baker Moore =

19th century American politician

Jonathan B. Moore

Sheriff of Grant County, Wisconsin
- In office January 7, 1861 – January 5, 1863
- Preceded by: William H. Foster
- Succeeded by: N. Goodenough

Member of the Wisconsin State Assembly from the Grant 3rd district
- In office January 2, 1860 – January 7, 1861
- Preceded by: Jesse Waldorf
- Succeeded by: Hanmer Robbins

Personal details
- Born: March 16, 1825 Posey County, Indiana, U.S.
- Died: February 8, 1889 (aged 63) Wauwatosa, Wisconsin, U.S.
- Resting place: Hillside Cemetery, Lancaster, Wisconsin
- Party: Republican
- Spouse: Christiana Wiley (died 1898)

Military service
- Allegiance: United States
- Branch/service: United States Volunteers; Union Army
- Years of service: 1862–1865
- Rank: Colonel, USV; Brevet Brig. General, USV
- Commands: 33rd Reg. Wis. Vol. Infantry
- Battles/wars: American Civil War: Vicksburg Campaign; Battle of Nashville; Red River Campaign; Mobile Campaign

Jonathan Baker Moore (March 16, 1825 – February 8, 1889) was an American businessman, politician, and Wisconsin pioneer. He served one term in the Wisconsin State Assembly, representing Grant County, and was a Union Army officer during the American Civil War.

== Biography ==
Moore was born on March 16, 1825, in Posey County, Indiana. In 1837, he and his family moved to Muscoda, Wisconsin. Moore died of a stroke on February 8, 1889, in Wauwatosa, Wisconsin, and is buried in Lancaster, Wisconsin. His entire estate was left to his wife, Christiana.

== Political career ==
Moore was Constable of Platteville, Wisconsin, from 1849 to 1852 and Clerk of Platteville in 1853. He was elected to the Wisconsin State Assembly in 1860 as a Republican and as Sheriff of Grant County, Wisconsin, in 1861.

== Military career ==
During the Civil War, Moore was appointed colonel of the Union Army's 33rd Wisconsin Infantry Regiment on October 18, 1862. He and the regiment later took part in the Red River Campaign, the Vicksburg Campaign, the Battle of Tupelo, the Battle of Atlanta, the Battle of Nashville, and the Battle of Spanish Fort. Moore was mustered out of the volunteers on August 9, 1865. On February 18, 1865, President Abraham Lincoln nominated Moore for appointment to the grade of brevet brigadier general of volunteers to rank from that date, and the United States Senate confirmed the appointment on March 3, 1865. On January 13, 1866, President Andrew Johnson nominated Moore for appointment to the grade of brevet brigadier general of volunteers to rank from March 26, 1865, and the United States Senate confirmed the appointment on March 12, 1866.

Military offices
Regiment established	Command of the 33rd Wisconsin Infantry Regiment; October 18, 1862 – August 8, 1865	Regiment disbanded
Wisconsin State Assembly
Preceded by Jesse Waldorf	Member of the Wisconsin State Assembly from the Grant 3rd district January 2, 1860 – January 7, 1861	Succeeded by Hanmer Robbins
