= List of Wisconsin units in the American Civil War =

The state of Wisconsin enrolled 91,327 men for service in the Union Army during the American Civil War, 77,375 in the infantry, 8,877 in the cavalry, and 5,075 in the artillery. Some 3,802 of these men were killed in action or mortally wounded, and 8,499 died from other causes; the total mortality was thus 12,301 men.

== Infantry units ==
- 1st Wisconsin Infantry Regiment (3 Months)
- 1st Wisconsin Infantry Regiment (3 Years)
- 2nd Wisconsin Infantry Regiment
- 3rd Wisconsin Infantry Regiment
- 4th Wisconsin Infantry Regiment
- 5th Wisconsin Infantry Regiment
- 6th Wisconsin Infantry Regiment
- 7th Wisconsin Infantry Regiment
- 8th Wisconsin Infantry Regiment
- 9th Wisconsin Infantry Regiment
- 10th Wisconsin Infantry Regiment
- 11th Wisconsin Infantry Regiment
- 12th Wisconsin Infantry Regiment
- 13th Wisconsin Infantry Regiment
- 14th Wisconsin Infantry Regiment
- 15th Wisconsin Infantry Regiment
- 16th Wisconsin Infantry Regiment
- 17th Wisconsin Infantry Regiment
- 18th Wisconsin Infantry Regiment
- 19th Wisconsin Infantry Regiment
- 20th Wisconsin Infantry Regiment
- 21st Wisconsin Infantry Regiment
- 22nd Wisconsin Infantry Regiment
- 23rd Wisconsin Infantry Regiment
- 24th Wisconsin Infantry Regiment
- 25th Wisconsin Infantry Regiment
- 26th Wisconsin Infantry Regiment
- 27th Wisconsin Infantry Regiment
- 28th Wisconsin Infantry Regiment
- 29th Wisconsin Infantry Regiment
- 30th Wisconsin Infantry Regiment
- 31st Wisconsin Infantry Regiment
- 32nd Wisconsin Infantry Regiment
- 33rd Wisconsin Infantry Regiment
- 34th Wisconsin Infantry Regiment
- 35th Wisconsin Infantry Regiment
- 36th Wisconsin Infantry Regiment
- 37th Wisconsin Infantry Regiment
- 38th Wisconsin Infantry Regiment
- 39th Wisconsin Infantry Regiment
- 40th Wisconsin Infantry Regiment
- 41st Wisconsin Infantry Regiment
- 42nd Wisconsin Infantry Regiment
- 43rd Wisconsin Infantry Regiment
- 44th Wisconsin Infantry Regiment
- 45th Wisconsin Infantry Regiment
- 46th Wisconsin Infantry Regiment
- 47th Wisconsin Infantry Regiment
- 48th Wisconsin Infantry Regiment
- 49th Wisconsin Infantry Regiment
- 50th Wisconsin Infantry Regiment
- 51st Wisconsin Infantry Regiment
- 52nd Wisconsin Infantry Regiment
- 53rd Wisconsin Infantry Regiment

== Cavalry units ==
- 1st Wisconsin Cavalry Regiment
- 2nd Wisconsin Cavalry Regiment
- 3rd Wisconsin Cavalry Regiment
- 4th Wisconsin Cavalry Regiment

== Artillery units ==
- 1st Wisconsin Heavy Artillery Regiment
- 1st Independent Battery Wisconsin Light Artillery
- 2nd Independent Battery Wisconsin Light Artillery
- 3rd Independent Battery Wisconsin Light Artillery
- 4th Independent Battery Wisconsin Light Artillery
- 5th Independent Battery Wisconsin Light Artillery
- 6th Independent Battery Wisconsin Light Artillery
- 7th Independent Battery Wisconsin Light Artillery
- 8th Independent Battery Wisconsin Light Artillery
- 9th Independent Battery Wisconsin Light Artillery
- 10th Independent Battery Wisconsin Light Artillery
- 11th Independent Battery Wisconsin Light Artillery
- 12th Independent Battery Wisconsin Light Artillery
- 13th Independent Battery Wisconsin Light Artillery

== Special units ==
- 1st Wisconsin Sharpshooters

== See also ==
- Lists of American Civil War Regiments by State
