= 13th Independent Battery Wisconsin Light Artillery =

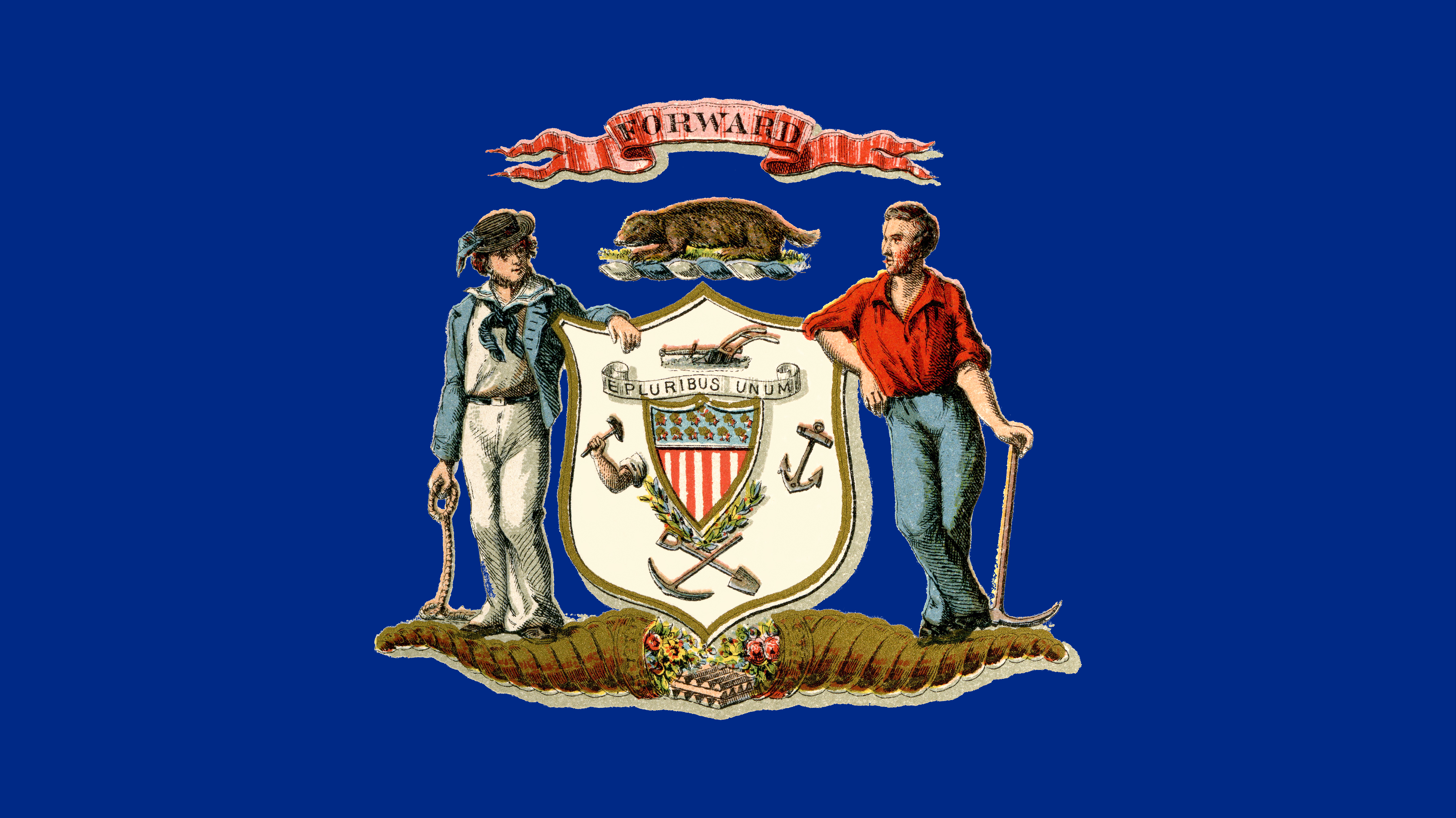
- Active: December 29, 1863 – July 20, 1865
- Disbanded: July 20, 1865
- Country: United States
- Allegiance: Union
- Branch: Artillery
- Engagements: American Civil War

Commanders
- Notable commanders: Captain Richard R. Griffith

The 13th Independent Battery Wisconsin Light Artillery, was an artillery battery that served in the Union Army during the American Civil War.

== Service ==
The 13th Independent Battery was mustered into service at Milwaukee, Wisconsin, on December 29, 1863. After the regiment was mustered, it marched to New Orleans, Louisiana, arriving on February 12, 1864, before moving on to Baton Rouge on February 17, where it was assigned to Fort Williams for garrison duty.

The regiment was mustered out of service on July 20, 1865.

== Total strength and casualties ==
The 13th Independent Battery initially recruited 156 officers and men. An additional 32 men were recruited as replacements, for a total of 188 men.

The battery suffered 14 enlisted men who died of disease, for a total of 14 fatalities.

== Commanders ==
- Captain Richard R. Griffith

== See also ==
- List of Wisconsin Civil War units
- Wisconsin in the American Civil War
