= 3rd Wisconsin Cavalry Regiment =

Union Army cavalry regiment

- Flag of Wisconsin
- Active: November 30, 1861 – October 27, 1865
- Country: United States
- Allegiance: Union
- Branch: Cavalry
- Size: Regiment
- Engagements: American Civil War: Operations North of Boston Mountains; First Battle of Newtonia; Prairie Grove Campaign; Battle of Prairie Grove; Operations to Control Indian Territory; Battle of Honey Springs; Price's Missouri Expedition; Second Battle of Lexington; Battle of Little Blue River; Battle of Byram's Ford; Battle of Westport; Battle of Mine Creek; Battle of Marmiton River; Second Battle of Newtonia

Commanders
- Colonel: William A. Barstow
- Lt. Colonel: Elias A. Calkins
- Colonel: Thomas Derry

The 3rd Wisconsin Cavalry Regiment was a volunteer cavalry regiment that served in the Union Army during the American Civil War.

== Service ==
The 3rd Wisconsin Cavalry Regiment was organized at Janesville, Wisconsin, from November 30, 1861, to January 31, 1862, and was mustered in on January 28, 1862, under the command of Colonel William Augustus Barstow.

The regiment was attached to Solomon's 1st Brigade, Herron's 1st Division, Army of the Frontier, Department of Missouri, to November 1862. Cavalry Command, Herron's Division, Army of the Frontier, to June 1863. District of the Frontier, Department of Missouri, to December 1863. 3rd Brigade, District of the Frontier, to January 1864. Unassigned, District of the Frontier, VII Corps, Department of Arkansas, to April 1864. Unassigned, Little Rock, Arkansas, VII Corps, to September 1864. 4th Brigade, Cavalry Division, VII Corps, to February 1865. Cavalry Brigade, Post of Little Rock, VII Corps, to April 1865. Unassigned, 1st Division, VII Corps, to June 1865. District of South Kansas, to September 1865.

All but two companies of the 3rd Wisconsin Cavalry mustered out of service at Fort Leavenworth, Kansas, on September 29, 1865. Company L mustered out on October 23, 1865, and Company L mustered out on October 27, 1865, also at Fort Leavenworth.

== Detailed service ==
Moved to St. Louis, Mo., March 26–28, 1862, and duty at Benton Barracks, Mo., until May 23. Moved to Fort Leavenworth, Kan., May 23–27. Assigned to frontier and provost duty in Kansas until September 1862. Company D at Atchison; Company G at Shawnee; Company L at Aubrey; Companies B and H at Fort Leavenworth; Companies A, E, and K at Leavenworth City. Companies C, F, I, and M moved to Fort Scott, Kan., June 12–17. Company C stationed at Trading Post until August; Company I at Carthage until August. Action at Monticello August 5. Rocky Bluff August 7. Taberville August 11. Expedition to Montevallo August 14–24. Hickory Grove August 23. Regiment assembled at Fort Scott September. Expedition from Fort Leavenworth to Independence August 12–14, 1862. (Companies I and M at Fort Scott until May 1863; also Companies C and G, December 1862 to July 1863; Company G relieved and ordered to the regiment.) 1st and 3rd Battalions in Blount's Campaign in Missouri and Arkansas against Raines and Parsons September to December 1862. Cross Hollows September 27–28. Newtonia September 30. Occupation of Newtonia October 4. Cane Hill November 28. Battle of Prairie Grove, Ark., December 7. Expedition over Boston Mountains to Van Buren, Ark., December 27–29. Dripping Springs December 28. Carthage, Mo., January 13, 1863. Moved to Forsythe, thence to Springfield, Mo. Duty there and at Drywood until June. Scouting in southwest counties of Missouri and northwest Arkansas, and operating against Patty's, Livingston's and Quantrill's guerrillas, with numerous skirmishes in Barton, Jasper and Newton Counties. Action at Carrollton March 2. Yellville March 4. The Island March 30. Clapper's Saw Mill, near Crooked Creek, Indian Territory, March 31 (detachment). Jackson County April 2. Companies B, O, H, I, and M marched to Fort Blount, Cherokee Nation, as escort to train, May 14–30. Near Fort Gibson May 20 and 25, and near Fort Blount May 30. Regiment moved to Fort Blount June 20-July 5. Action at Cabin Creek July 1–2 (Company B). Honey Springs July 17 and August 22. Perryville August 26. Marias Des Cygnes August 31. At Schuyleyville, Cherokee Nation, until October· Expedition through Jackson, Cass, Johnson and Lafayette Counties September 8–23 (Companies B and L). Choctaw Nation October 2. Baxter Springs October 6 (Companies C and I). Fort Blair, Waldron, October 7. Choctaw Nation October 7. Waldron October 16. Clarksville October 28. Raid from Van Buren to Dallas November 12–22. Duty at Van Buren November 1863 to March 1864. Moved to Little Rock March 30-April 16. Veterans on furlough March 30-June 16, then moved to Little Rock via St. Louis, Memphis and Devall's Bluff June 16-July 27. Clarendon July 14 (non-veterans). Expedition from Little Rock to Little Red River August 6–16. Hickory Plains and Bull's Bayou August 7. Bull's Bayou and Jacksonport August 26. Pursuit of Shelby's forces August 28-September 7. Expedition from Little Rock to Fort Smith September 25-October 13 (detachment). Clarksville September 28 and October 19. Expedition from Lewisburg to Benton November 2–3. Duty at Little Rock until April 1865 (Companies B, E, G, H, I, K, and L). Expedition up White River to Devall's Bluff December 13–15, 1864. Regiment reorganized into 5 companies April 16, 1865. Moved to Duvall's Bluff April 21, and duty there until June 3. Moved to St. Louis, Mo., June 3, thence to Rolla and Springfield, Mo., and marched to Fort Leavenworth, Kan., July 18-August 3. Mustered out at Fort Leavenworth September 8, 1865. Companies A, C, D, F, and M served detached in District of the Border October 1863 to January 1864. In District of Kansas to September 1864. District of South Kansas to April 1865, and District of North Kansas to September 1865, serving at different posts in Missouri and Kansas, Sub-District of Fort Scott, at Forts Insley, Mo., Hamer, Mo., Curtis, Mo., McKean, Mo., Pawnee Creek, Kan., etc. Arkansas Creek near Fort Larned November 13, 1863 (detachment). Dogwood Creek May 16 (Company C). Lane's Prairie, Marian County, May 26. Actions at Montevallo, Mo., June 12, 1864 (detachment). Big North Fork Creek Mo., June 16 (Company C). Near Dogwood July 7. Osage Mission, Kan., September 26. Operations against Price in Missouri and Arkansas September to November 1864. Lexington October 19 (detachment). Near Montevallo October 19. Little Blue October 21. Big Blue and State Line October 22. Battle of Westport October 23. Engagement at the Marmiton or Battle of Chariot October 25. Mine Creek, Little Osage River, October 25. Newtonia October 28. Drywood October 29. Company A changed to Company K, Company C to Company H, Company D to Company I, and Company M to Company G, April 16, 1865. Companies F and H on expedition to explore country from Fort Riley, Kan., to Denver, Colo., Smoky Hill Route, March to July 1865.

== Casualties ==
The regiment lost a total of 217 men during service; 3 officers and 61 enlisted men killed or mortally wounded, 6 officer and 147 enlisted men died of disease.

== Commanders ==
- Colonel William Augustus Barstow (November 30, 1861 – March 4, 1865) was assigned provost marshal general of Kansas. He was detached in August 1863 to serve as president of a court martial and never rejoined the regiment. Before the war, he had been the 3rd Governor of Wisconsin.
- Lt. Colonel Elias A. Calkins (August 1863 – February 14, 1865) was acting commander when Barstow was detached from the regiment.
  - Captain Edward R. Stevens commanded a detachment of the regiment at the Battle of Honey Springs
  - Captain Robert Carpenter commanded a detachment at the Battle of Westport
  - 1st Lieutenant James B. Pond commanded a detachment at the Battle of Mine Creek.
- Colonel Thomas Derry (March 9, 1865 – September 8, 1865) was commander of the reorganized regiment. Earlier, he had been captain of Co. L and major of the 1st battalion.

== Notable members ==
- Leonard C. Church was a private in Co. L. After the war he became a Wisconsin state legislator.
- Theodore Conkey was captain of Co. I and later captain of Co. G after the regiment was reorganized. He was designated for promotion to lieutenant colonel but was never mustered at that rank. Before the war he had served as a Wisconsin state senator.
- Asa W. Farr was quartermaster of the regiment. He was murdered in the massacre at Baxter Springs. Before the war he had served as a Wisconsin state legislator.
- Fernando C. Kizer was 1st lieutenant in Co. D. He was designated for promotion to captain in August 1864 but was never mustered at that rank. After the war he became a Wisconsin state legislator.
- George F. Pond was a private in Co. C. He received the Medal of Honor for action at Drywood, Kansas.
- James B. Pond was 2nd lieutenant and later captain of Co. C, and was captain of Co. H after the regiment was reorganized. He received the Medal of Honor for action at the Battle of Mine Creek.
- Christopher Raesser was a private in Co. M. After the war he became a Wisconsin state legislator.
- Benoni Reynolds was surgeon of the regiment. After the war he became a Wisconsin state senator.
- Samuel Ryan, Jr., was quartermaster sergeant for the 2nd battalion. After the war he became a Wisconsin state legislator and county judge.
- William H. Thomas was a private in Co. D, then adjutant of the 1st battalion, and finally captain of Co. H. Before the war he had served as a Wisconsin state legislator.
- David Vittum was captain of Co. F and later lieutenant colonel of the reorganized regiment. Before the war he had served as a Wisconsin state senator.

== See also ==
- List of Wisconsin Civil War units
- Wisconsin in the American Civil War
