= 7th Independent Battery Wisconsin Light Artillery =

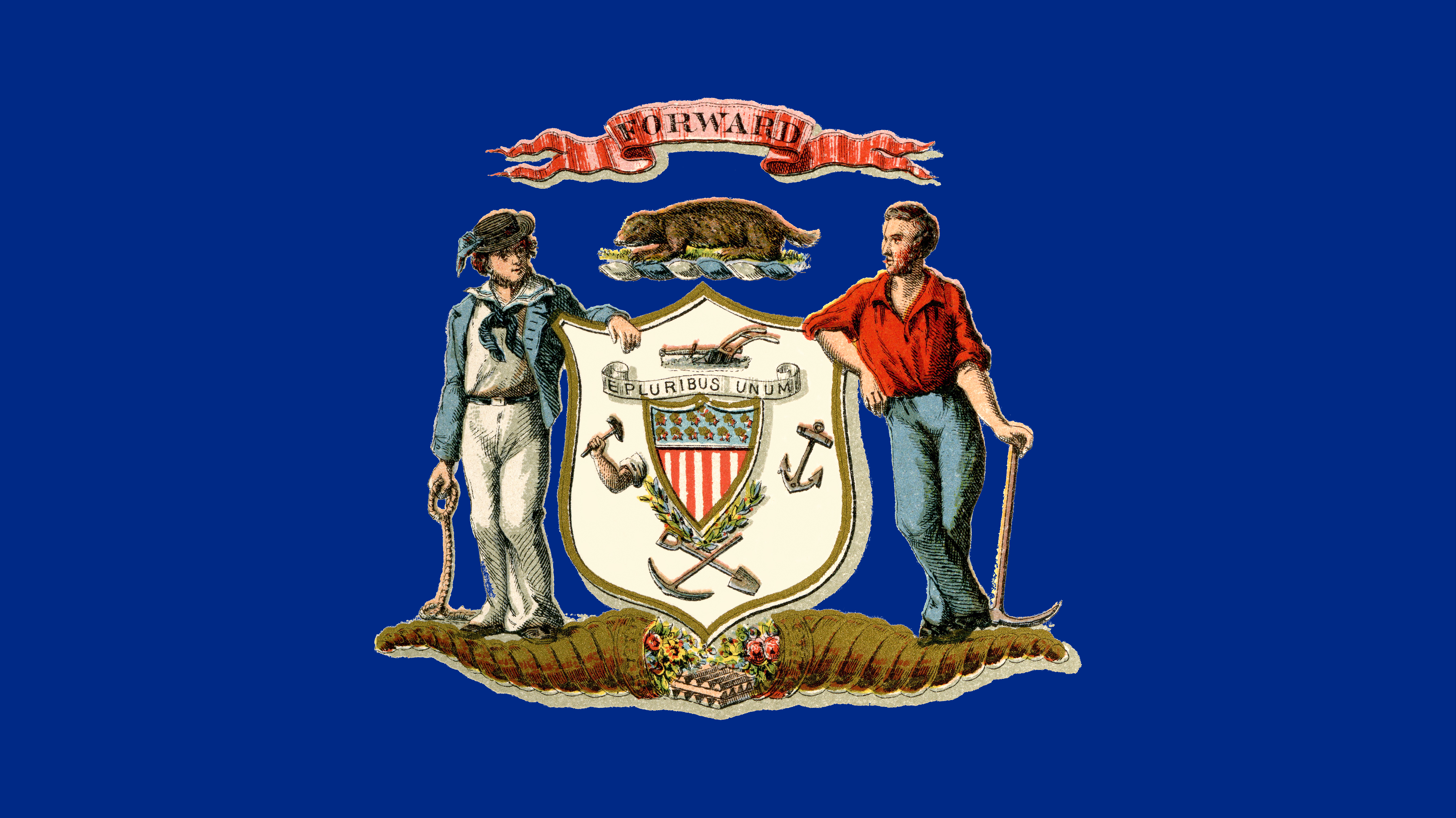
- Active: October 4, 1861, to July 6, 1865
- Country: United States
- Allegiance: Union
- Branch: Artillery
- Engagements: Battle of Brice's Crossroads

The 7th Independent Battery Wisconsin Light Artillery, nicknamed the "Badger State Flying Artillery," was an artillery battery that served in the Union Army during the American Civil War.

== Service ==
The 7th Independent Battery was mustered into service at Racine, Wisconsin, on October 4, 1861.

The battery was mustered out on July 6, 1865.

== Total strength and casualties ==
The 7th Independent Battery initially recruited 158 officers and men. An additional 94 men were recruited as replacements, for a total of 252 men.

The battery suffered 1 officer and 9 enlisted men killed in action or died of wounds and 19 enlisted men who died of disease, for a total of 29 fatalities.

== Commanders ==
- Captain Richard R. Griffth
- Captain Harry S. Lee
- Captain Arthur B. Wheelock

== See also ==
- List of Wisconsin Civil War units
- Wisconsin in the American Civil War
