= 46th Wisconsin Infantry Regiment =

Union Army infantry regiment

- Flag of Wisconsin
- Active: March 2, 1865 – September 27, 1865
- Country: United States
- Allegiance: Union
- Branch: Infantry
- Role: Patrol and guard duties
- Size: 859 (Initial); 802 (Final)
- Engagements: None

Commanders
- Colonel: Frederick S. Lovell

The 46th Wisconsin Infantry Regiment was a volunteer infantry regiment that served in the Union Army during the American Civil War.

== Service ==
The 46th Wisconsin was organized at Madison, Wisconsin, and mustered into Federal service on March 2, 1865.

After they were mustered, the 859-strong regiment moved to Louisville, Kentucky, arriving there on March 10, and subsequently moved to Athens, Alabama, on April 24. At Athens, Colonel. Lovell took command of the post at Athens, while Lieutenant Colonel Smeldy took command of the regiment. The regiment spent the rest of their service performing patrol and guard duty on the Nashville & Decatur Railroad until September 27.

The regiment was mustered out on September 27, 1865 at Nashville, with 802 men.

== Casualties ==
The 46th Wisconsin suffered 0 officers and 20 enlisted men who died of disease, for a total of 20 fatalities.

== Commanders ==
- Colonel Frederick S. Lovell

== See also ==
- List of Wisconsin Civil War units
- Wisconsin in the American Civil War
