= Wisconsin in the American Civil War =

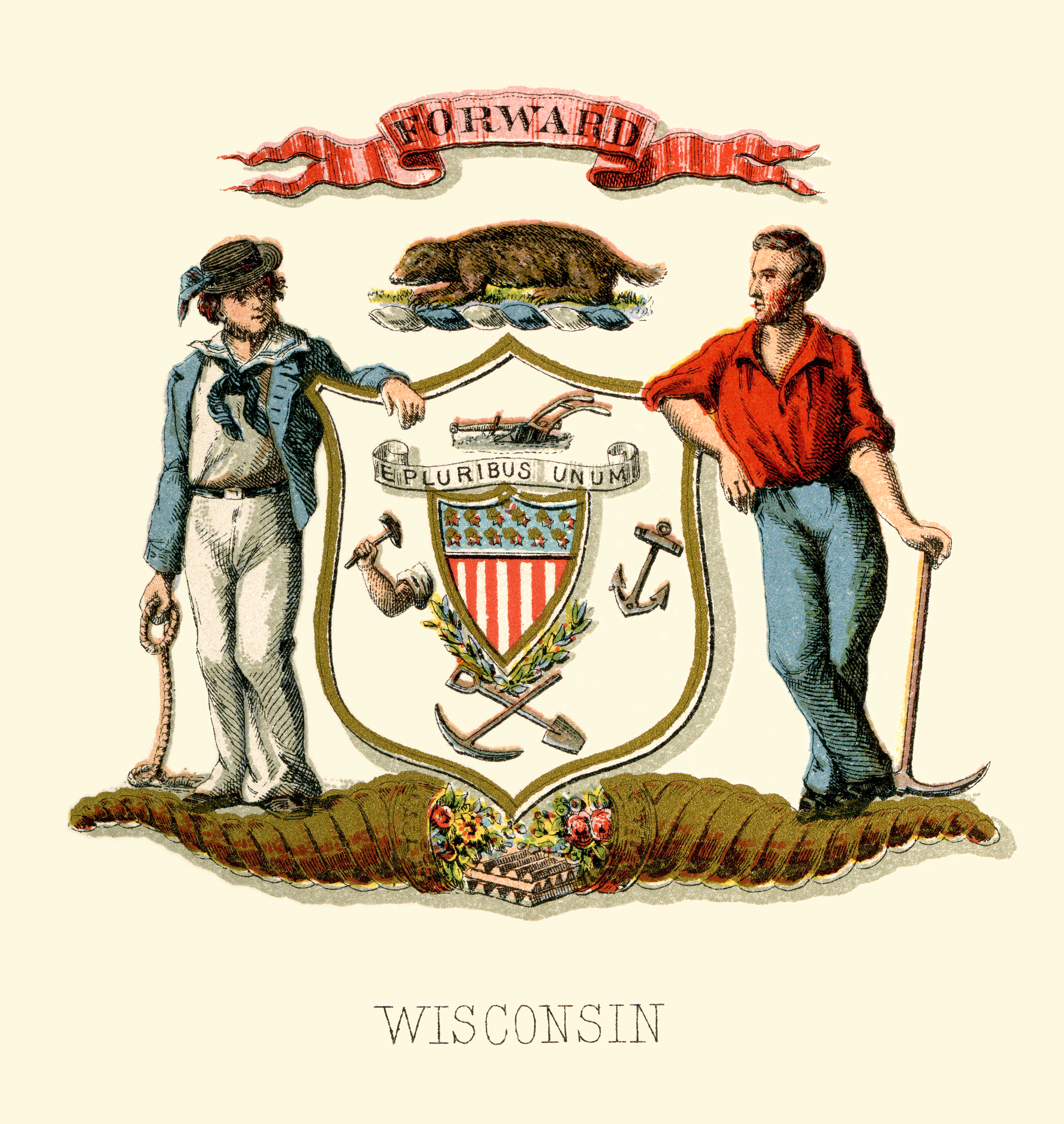
The coat of arms of Wisconsin during the war.

During the American Civil War, the state of Wisconsin raised 91,379 soldiers for the Union Army, organized into 53 infantry regiments, 4 cavalry regiments, a company of Berdan's sharpshooters, 13 light artillery batteries and 1 unit of heavy artillery. 3,794 were killed in action or mortally wounded, 8,022 died of disease, and 400 were killed in accidents. The total mortality was 12,216 men, about 13.4 percent of total enlistments.

Most of the Wisconsin troops served in the Western Theater, although several regiments served in Eastern armies, including three regiments within the famed Iron Brigade.

== Soldiers ==
Approximately 1 in 9 residents (regardless of age, sex or qualification for service) served in the army, and, in turn, half the eligible voters served. Wisconsin was the only state to organize replacements for troops that had already been fielded, leading northern generals to prefer having some regiments from the state under their command if possible.

A number of Wisconsin regiments were distinguished. Three served in the celebrated "Iron Brigade"— the 2nd Wisconsin, 6th Wisconsin, and 7th Wisconsin. The Iron Brigade was noted for their hard fighting and dashing appearance, being among the few troops in the Army of the Potomac to wear Hardee hats and long frock coats. They made significant contributions at the Battle of Antietam and during the first day of the Battle of Gettysburg, but suffered significant casualties. Another well-known regiment was the 8th Wisconsin, who was often accompanied into battle by its pet bald eagle and mascot, Old Abe.

In a January 1863 letter to his sister, Union soldier Chauncey Herbert Cooke, a private from Company G of the 25th Wisconsin Infantry Regiment, gave his reasons for fighting for the Union in the war, stating that "I have no heart in this war if the slaves cannot go free."

== Women during the war ==
Besides having to tend to the home and children while the men were away at war, women contributed to the war effort in many other ways. Women contributed by making bandages, sewing company and regimental flags, attending war meetings, making baked goods for training camps and hospitals, knitting mittens, and organizing aid societies. By the end of the war, Wisconsin had 229 local aid societies.

Quilts and blankets were also given to soldiers. Some had encouraging messages sewn on them. One quilt that was made in 1864 by a group of women in Green Bay had the following poem:

For the gay and happy soldier
We're contented as a dove,
But the man who will not enlist
Never can gain our love.
If rebels attack you, do run with the quilt
And safe to some fortress convey it;
For o'er the gaunt body of some old secesh
We did not intend to display it.
T'was made for brave boys, who went from the West;
And swiftly the fair fingers flew,
While each stitch, as it went to its place in the quilt,
Was a smothered "God bless you, boys," too.

Some women worked at the front as nurses in army hospitals. There were also at least two Wisconsin women who disguised as men to enlist and fight for the Union army.

=== Cordelia Harvey ===
During the Civil War, Cordelia Harvey, widow of Louis P. Harvey, gained a national reputation as an "angel of mercy" due to her advocacy for sick and wounded soldiers.

== Civil War Camps ==
Camp Barstow was established in 1861 near Janesville. The 3rd Wisconsin Cavalry Regiment organized and trained at Camp Barstow until March 1862.

Camp Bragg was established in 1862 in Oshkosh.

Camp Hamilton (formerly Camp Wood) was established in 1861 in Fond du Lac. The 3rd Wisconsin and 14th Wisconsin infantry regiments trained at Camp Hamilton.

Camp Harvey was established in 1861 in Kenosha. The 1st Wisconsin Cavalry Regiment organized and trained at Camp Harvey until March 1862.

Camp Holton (later Camp Sigel, Camp Reno) was established in 1861 in Milwaukee. Six Wisconsin infantry regiments trained at Camp Holton.

Camp Randall was established in 1861 in Madison. It was initially a training camp, and in 1862 it became a prison camp. Today, the former location of the camp is the home of University of Wisconsin's Camp Randall Stadium. 12 Wisconsin infantry regiments, making up 76% of all Wisconsin Civil War troops, trained at Camp Randall.

Camp Salomon was established in 1862 in La Crosse. The 25th Wisconsin Infantry Regiment trained at Camp Salomon.

Camp Scott was established in 1861 in Milwaukee. The 1st Wisconsin Infantry Regiment trained at Camp Scott.

Camp Treadway was established in 1861 in Janesville. The 13th Wisconsin Infantry Regiment trained at Camp Treadway.

Camp Utley was established in 1862 in Racine. Three Wisconsin infantry regiments and ten Wisconsin light artillery batteries trained at Camp Utley.

Camp Washburn was established in 1861 in Milwaukee. Seven Wisconsin infantry regiments, the 2nd Wisconsin Cavalry Regiment, and the 13th Battery Wisconsin Light Artillery trained at Camp Washburn.

== See also ==
- List of Wisconsin Civil War units
- Belgian immigrants in Wisconsin during the Civil War
