= 1853 Wisconsin lieutenant gubernatorial election =

- November 8, 1853
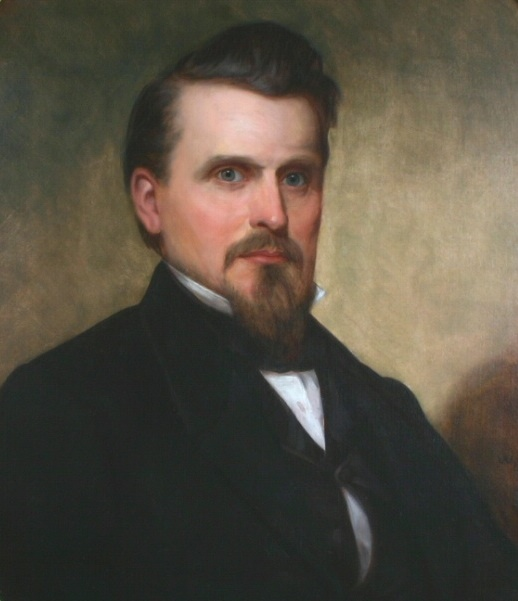

Nominee	James T. Lewis	Bertine Pinckney
Party	Democratic	Whig
Popular vote	32,176	23,378
Percentage	57.59%	41.85%
Lieutenant Governor before election
Vacant
Elected Lieutenant Governor
James T. Lewis
Democratic

The 1853 Wisconsin lieutenant gubernatorial election was held on November 8, 1853, in order to elect the lieutenant governor of Wisconsin. Democratic nominee and incumbent member of the Wisconsin Senate James T. Lewis defeated Whig nominee and fellow incumbent member of the Wisconsin Senate Bertine Pinckney. Free soil nominee and former member of the Wisconsin State Assembly Jonathan Daugherty initially ran for this office as well, but withdrew on October 29, 1853, in favor of Whig nominee Bertine Pinckney.

== General election ==
On election day, November 8, 1853, Democratic nominee James T. Lewis won the election by a margin of 8,798 votes against his opponent Whig nominee Bertine Pinckney, thereby retaining Democratic control over the office of lieutenant governor. Lewis was sworn in as the 4th lieutenant governor of Wisconsin on January 2, 1854.

=== Results ===
Wisconsin lieutenant gubernatorial election, 1853
Party	Candidate	Votes	%
Democratic	James T. Lewis	32,176	57.59
Whig	Bertine Pinckney	23,378	41.85
Free Soil	Jonathan Daugherty (withdrawn)	270	0.48
	Scattering	44	0.08
Total votes		55,868	100.00
Democratic hold			
