= Franklin–Nashville campaign =

1864 military campaign during the American Civil War

- Part of the American Civil War
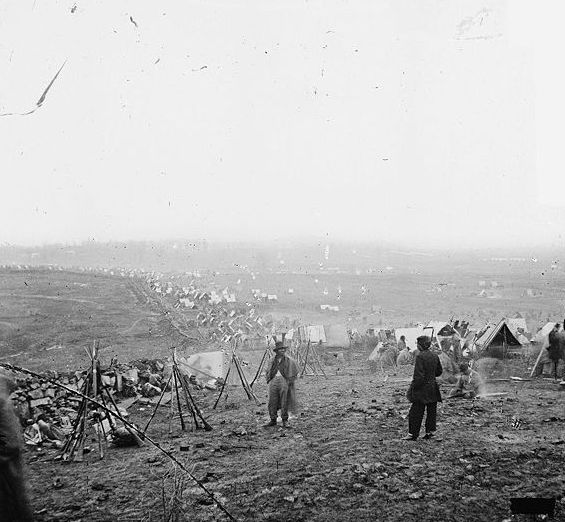
- Union army at Nashville, December 1864
Date	18 September – 27 December 1864
Location	Alabama, Georgia, and Tennessee
Result	Union victory; end of large-scale fighting in the Western Theater.

Belligerents
United States (Union)	Confederate States

Commanders and leaders
(United States) George H. Thomas (United States) John Schofield	(Confederate States of America) John B. Hood

Units involved
Army of the Cumberland; Army of the Ohio	Army of Tennessee

Strength
65,501 (Nov. 20); 75,194 (Nov. 30); 75,153 (Dec. 10)	44,719 (Nov. 6); 36,426 (Dec. 10)

Casualties and losses
6,598 (725 KIA, 4,424 WIA, 1,445 MIA/POW) ~7,000	15,097 (2,277 KIA, 8,017 WIA, 4,742 MIA/POW) ~10,000 (not including deserters, missing, and captured)

The Franklin–Nashville campaign, also known as Hood's Tennessee campaign, was a series of battles in the Western Theater, conducted from September 18 to December 27, 1864, in Alabama, Tennessee, and northwestern Georgia during the American Civil War.

The Confederate Army of Tennessee under Lieutenant General John B. Hood drove north from Atlanta, threatening Major General William T. Sherman's lines of communications and Middle Tennessee. After a brief attempt to pursue Hood, Sherman returned to Atlanta and began his March to the Sea, leaving Union forces under Maj. Gen. George H. Thomas to deal with Hood's threat.

Hood hoped to defeat the Union force under Maj. Gen. John Schofield before it could converge with Thomas's army and attempted to do so at the Battle of Spring Hill on Tuesday, November 29, but poorly coordinated Confederate attacks combined with effective U.S. forces leadership allowed Schofield to escape. The following day, Hood launched a series of futile frontal assaults against Schofield's field fortifications in the Battle of Franklin, suffering heavy casualties; Schofield withdrew his force and successfully linked up with Thomas in Nashville, Tennessee. On December 15–16, Thomas's combined army attacked Hood's depleted army and routed it in the Battle of Nashville, sending it in retreat to Tupelo, Mississippi. Hood resigned his commission shortly thereafter and the Army of Tennessee ceased to exist as an effective fighting force.

== Background ==
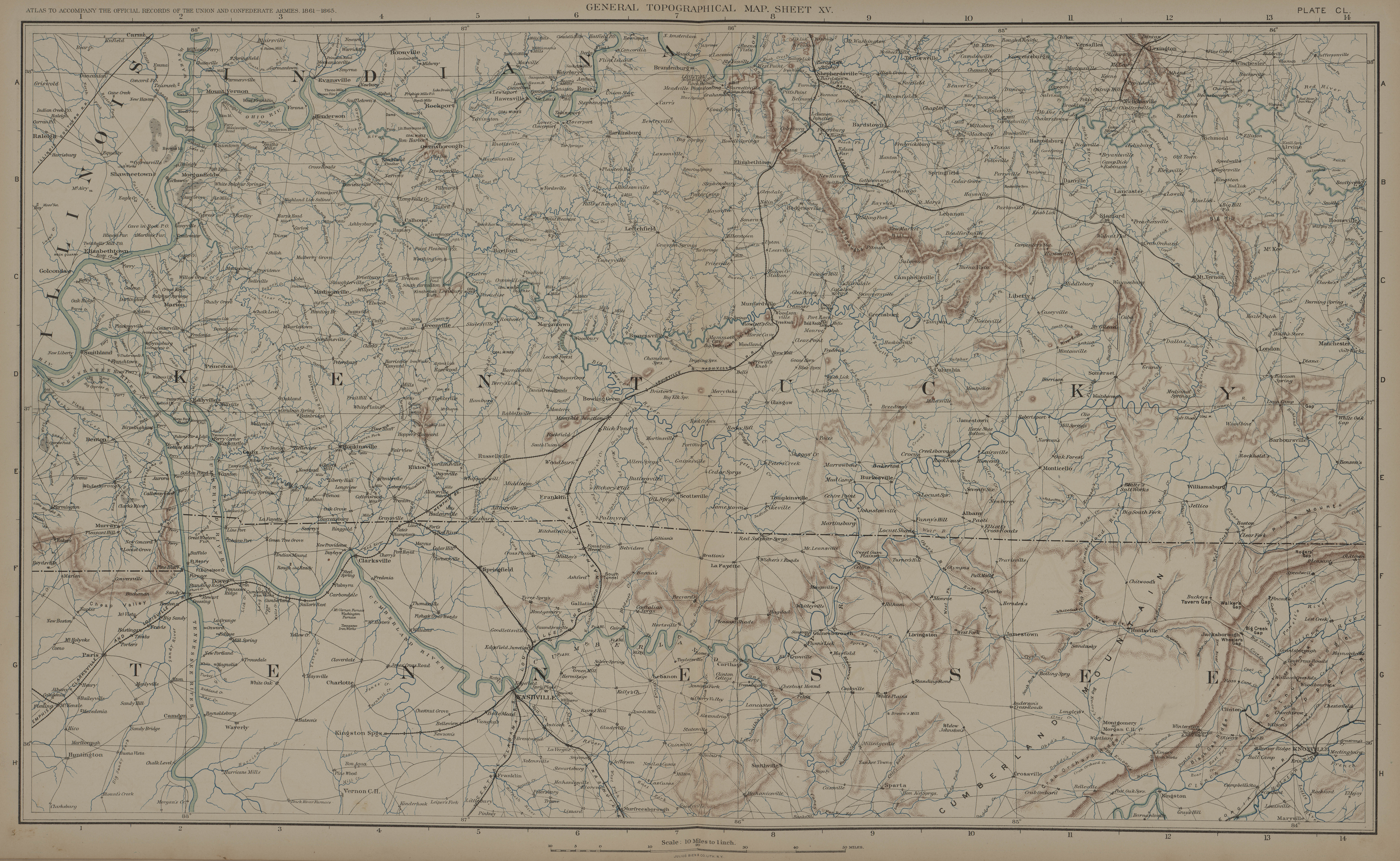
Kentucky-Northern Tennessee, 1864

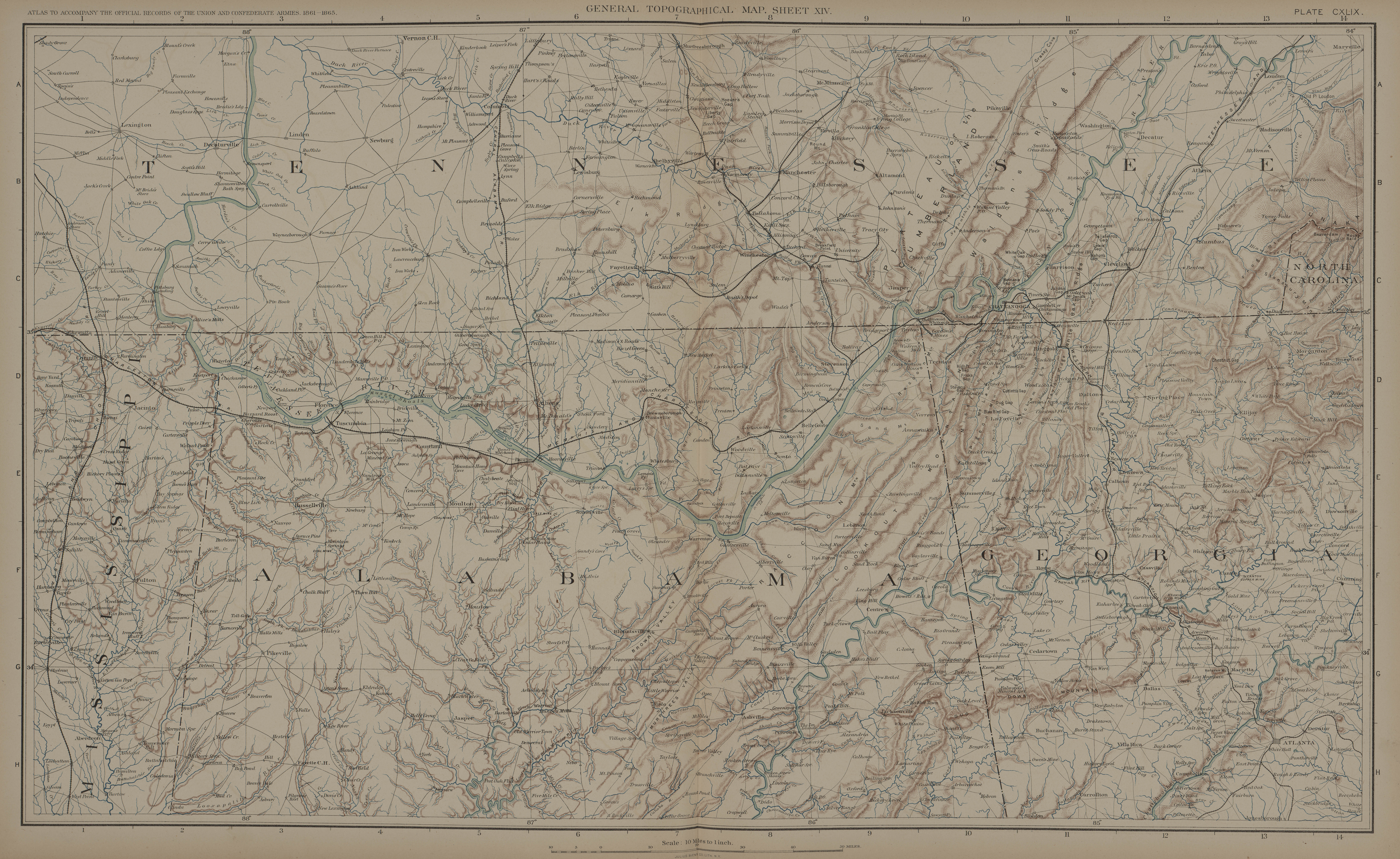
Southern Tennessee-Alabama, 1864

At the conclusion of his successful Atlanta campaign, Sherman occupied the city of Atlanta on September 2, 1864, and Hood, who was forced to evacuate the city, regrouped at Lovejoy's Station. For almost a month, the normally aggressive Sherman took little action while his men sat about idly, and many left the army at the end of their enlistments. On September 21, Hood moved his forces to Palmetto, Georgia, where on September 25, he was visited by Confederate President Jefferson Davis. The two men planned their strategy, which called for Hood to move toward Chattanooga, Tennessee, and operate against Sherman's lines of communications. They hoped that Sherman would follow and that Hood would be able to maneuver Sherman into a decisive battle on terrain favorable to the Confederates.

During the conference, Davis expressed his disappointment in Hood's performance during the Atlanta campaign, losing tens of thousands of men in ill-advised frontal assaults for no significant gains, and implied that he was considering replacing Hood in command of the army. After the president's departure for Montgomery, Alabama, he telegraphed Hood that he had decided to retain him in command and, acceding to Hood's request, transferred Lt. Gen. William J. Hardee, one of Hood's corps commanders, out of the Army of Tennessee. He also established a new theater commander to supervise Hood and the department of Lt. Gen. Richard Taylor, although the officer selected for the assignment, Gen. P.G.T. Beauregard, was not expected to exert any real operational control of the armies in the field.

Although Sherman was planning to march east to seize the city of Savannah, Georgia, (the campaign that would be known as Sherman's March to the Sea) he was concerned about his lines of communications back to Chattanooga. One particular threat was the cavalry commander Nathan Bedford Forrest, who had long bedeviled Union expeditions with lightning raids into their rear areas. On September 29, Lieutenant General Ulysses S. Grant urged Sherman to dispose of Forrest and Sherman sent Thomas to Nashville, Tennessee, to organize all of the troops in the state. Sherman sent another division, under Brigadier General (Brig. Gen.) James D. Morgan, to Chattanooga.

Sherman had some advance notice of the nature of Hood's proposed campaign. In a series of speeches given at stops along his way back to Richmond, President Davis rallied his listeners by predicting success for Hood, speeches that were reported in the press and read avidly by Sherman. In Columbia, South Carolina, his speech included:

General Hood's strategy has been good and his conduct has been gallant. His eye is now fixed upon a point far beyond that where he was assailed by the enemy. He hopes soon to have his hand upon Sherman's line of communications, and to fix it where he can hold it. ... I believe it is in the power of the men of the Confederacy to plant our banners on the banks of the Ohio, where we shall say to the Yankee, "be quiet or we shall teach you another lesson." (Note: Sherman discounts the specific nature of Davis's rhetoric and states that there is "little in Davis's several messages to indicate that any plan was in the making for leaving Sherman behind and invading Tennessee and the Ohio Valley. ... such comments had been made often by Confederate leaders attempting to whip up the western morale.)

== Opposing forces ==
=== Confederate ===
Principal Confederate commanders
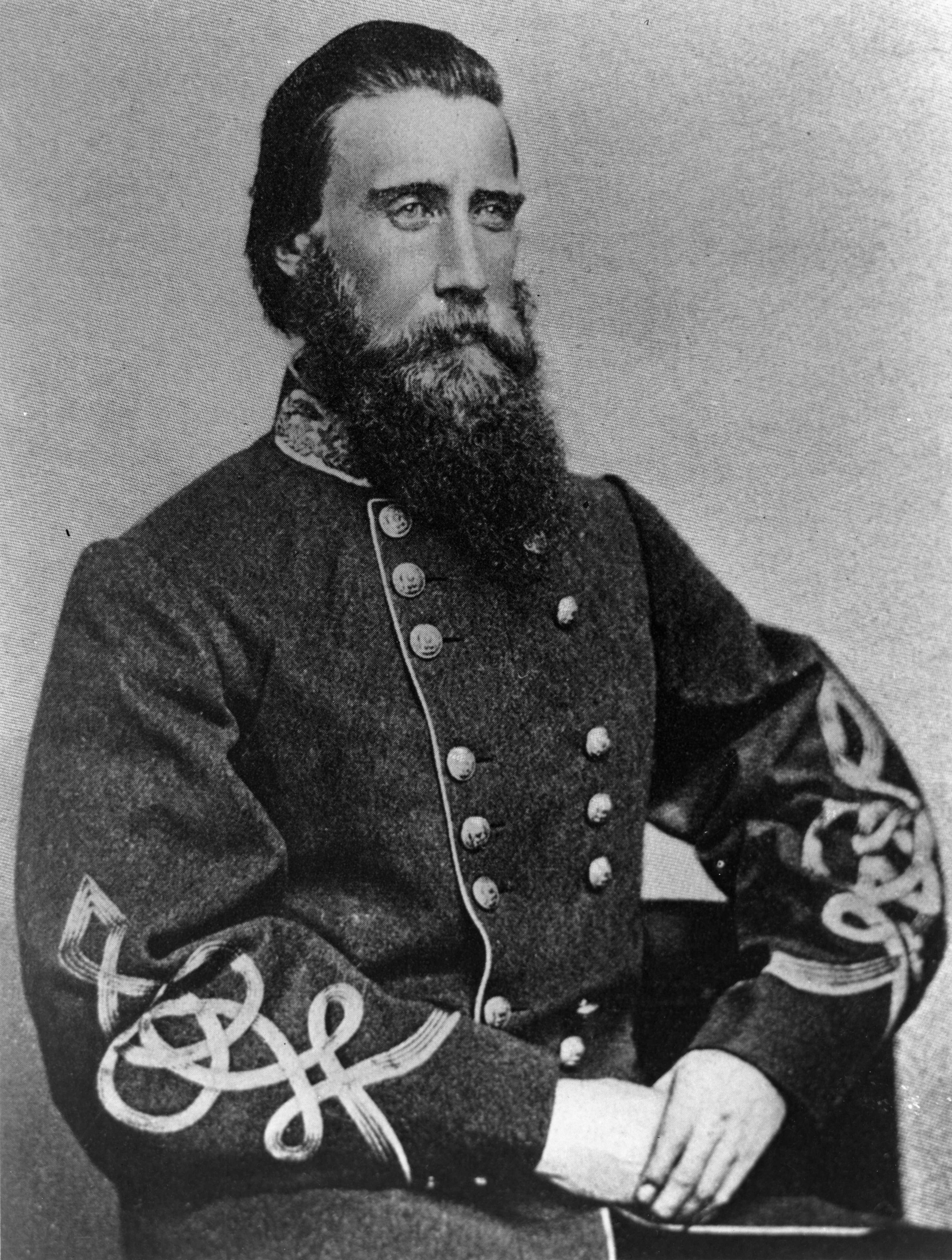
Lt. Gen.
John B. Hood

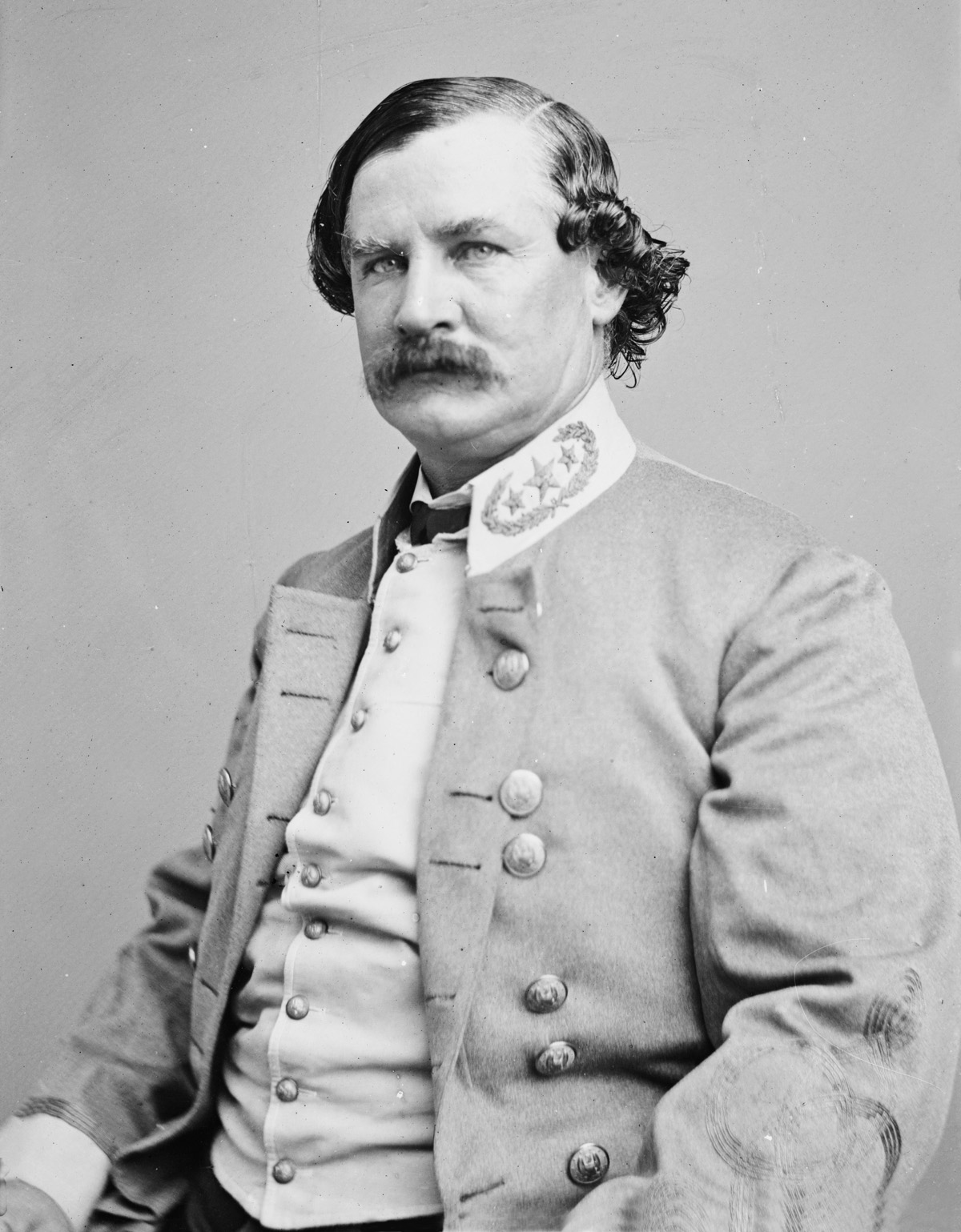
Maj. Gen.
Benjamin F. Cheatham

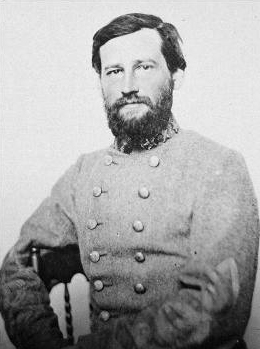
Lt. Gen.
Stephen D. Lee

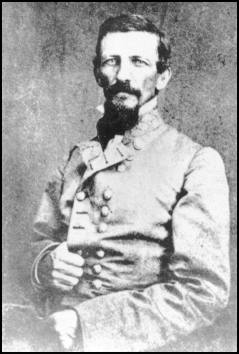
Lt. Gen.
Alexander P. Stewart

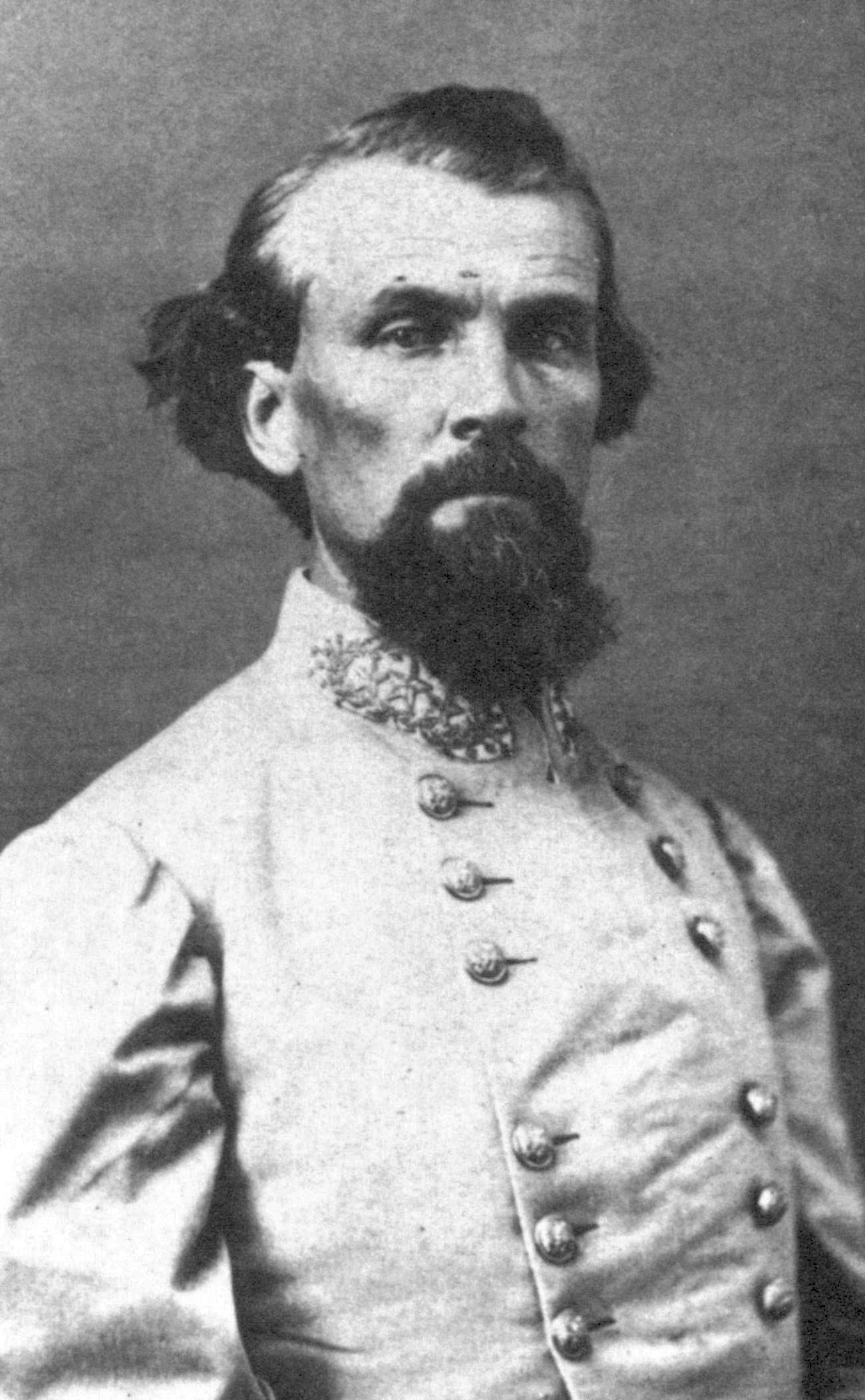
Maj. Gen.
Nathan Bedford Forrest

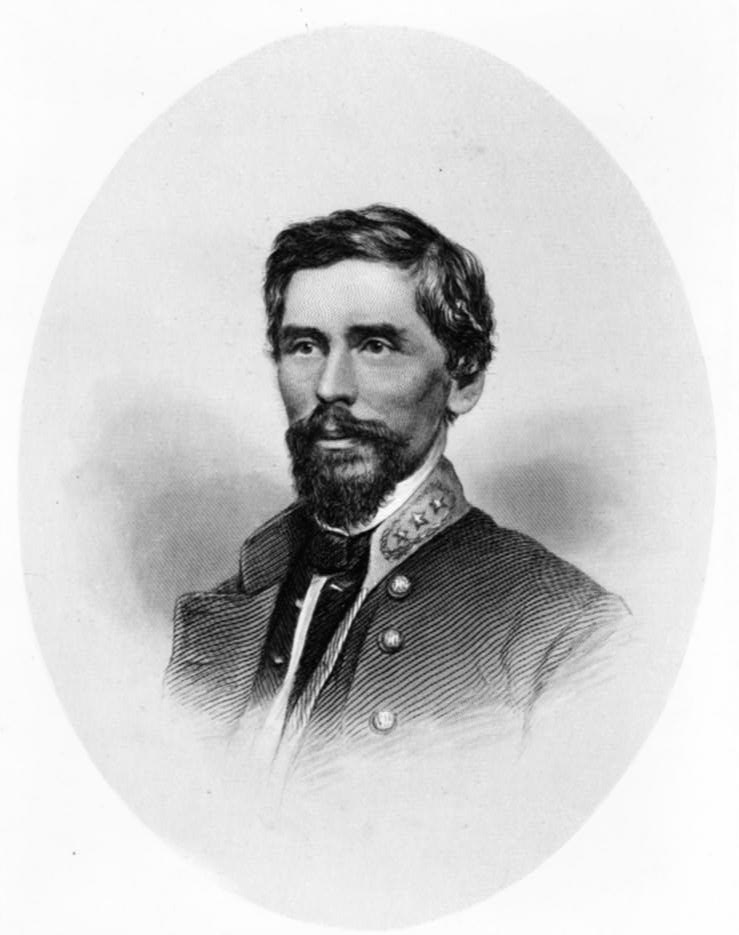
Maj. Gen.
Patrick Cleburne

Lt. Gen. John B. Hood's (Note: At the start of the Atlanta Campaign, Hood was appointed a temporary "full" general, but this appointment was never confirmed by the Confederate Congress and was later rescinded.) Army of Tennessee, at 39,000 men, constituted the second-largest remaining army of the Confederacy, ranking in strength only after Gen. Robert E. Lee's Army of Northern Virginia. The army consisted of the corps of Maj. Gen. Benjamin F. Cheatham, Lt. Gen. Stephen D. Lee, and Lt. Gen. Alexander P. Stewart, and cavalry forces under Maj. Gen. Nathan Bedford Forrest. Confederate inspections produced after the fall of Atlanta, but before the start of the new campaign indicate that while the Confederate Army of Tennessee's soldiers were poorly clothed, they were well equipped with modern weapons.

=== Union ===
Principal Union commanders
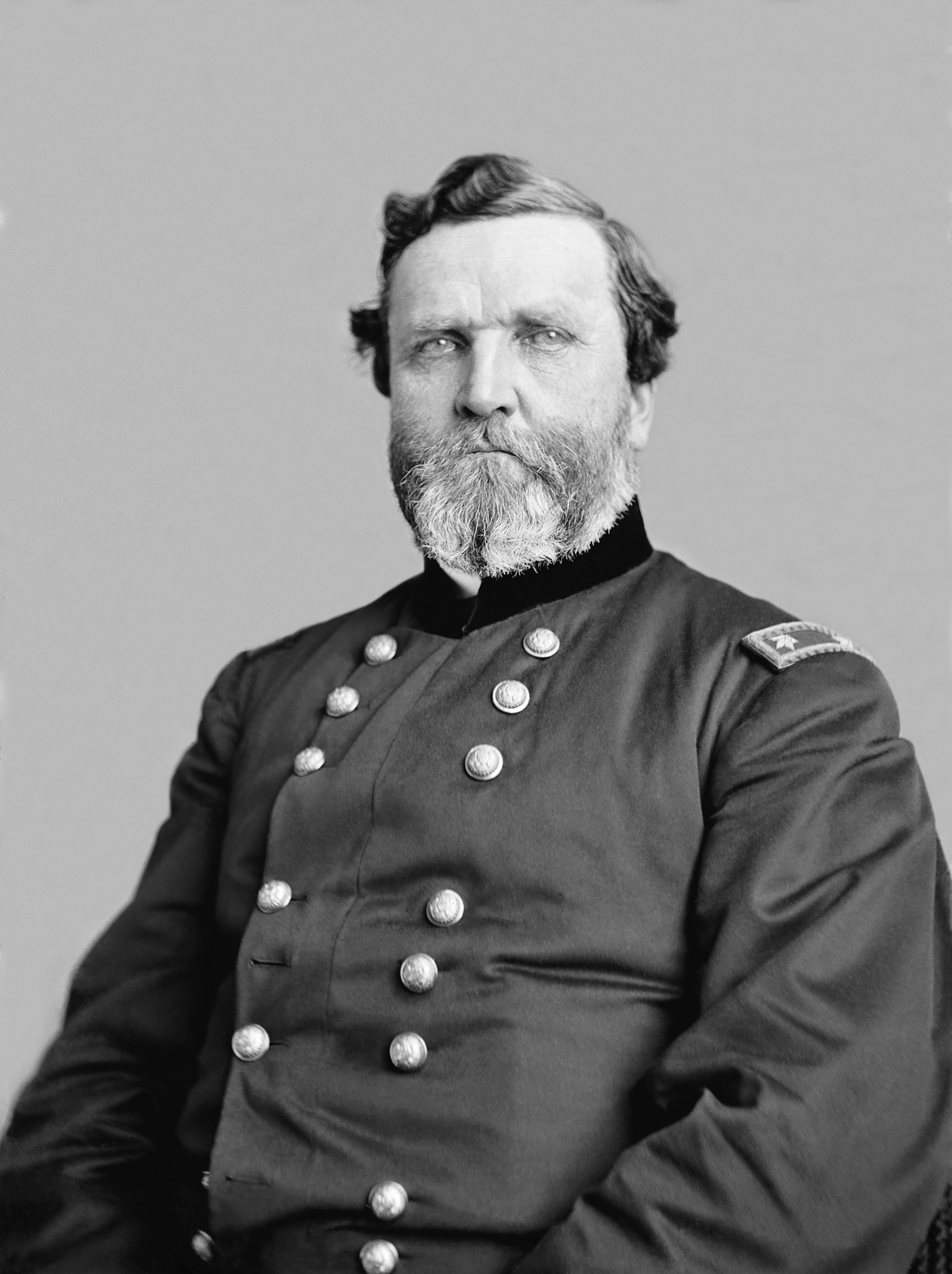
Maj. Gen.
George H. Thomas

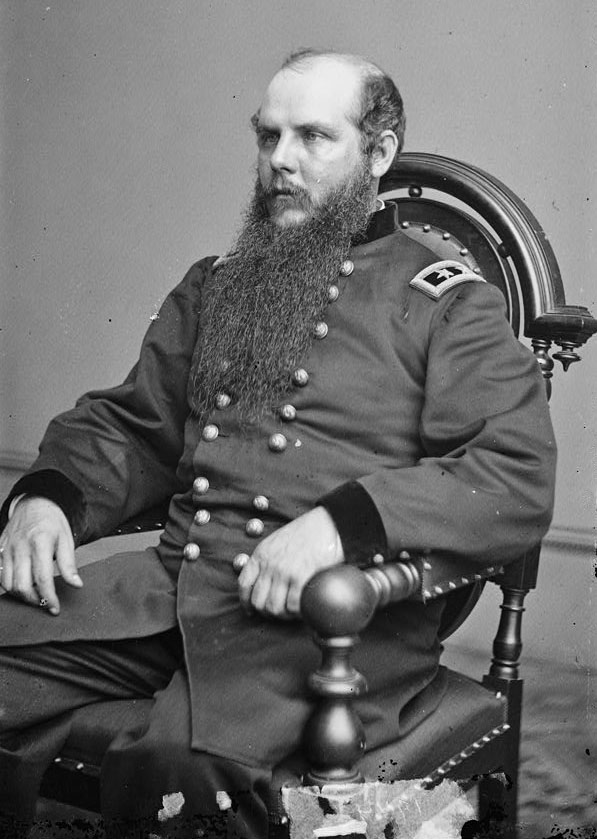
Maj. Gen.
John Schofield

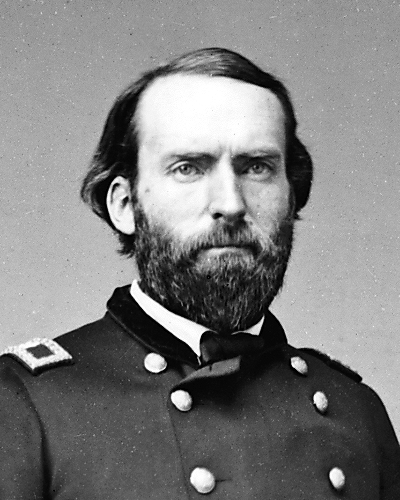
Maj. Gen.
David S. Stanley

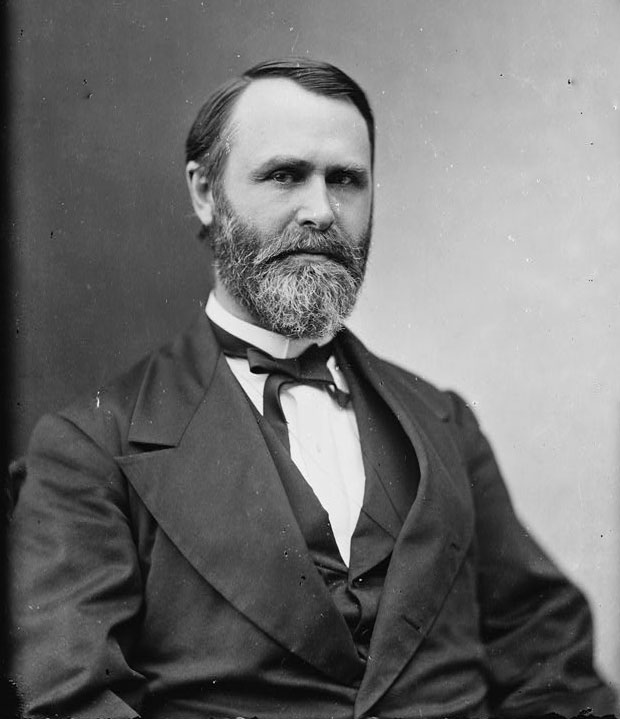
Brig. Gen.
Jacob D. Cox

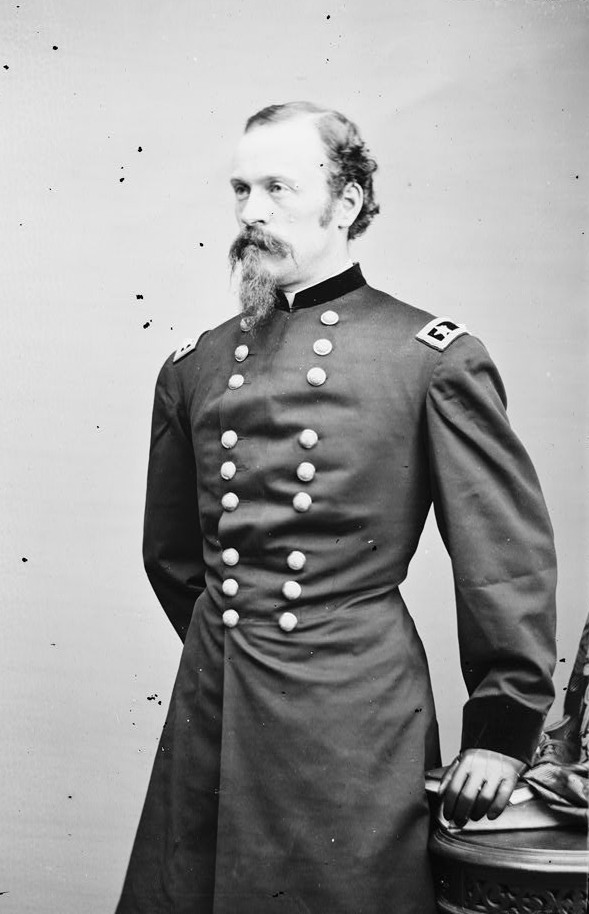
Maj. Gen.
James H. Wilson

At the beginning of the campaign, Union forces designated the Military Division of the Mississippi were commanded by Sherman in Atlanta, but his personal involvement in the campaign lasted only until the end of October. Reporting to Sherman was the Army of the Cumberland under Maj. Gen. George H. Thomas (the "Rock of Chickamauga"), the force previously commanded by Maj. Gen. William S. Rosecrans. Thomas was the principal Union commander after Sherman's departure. Subordinate to him was the Army of the Ohio, commanded by Maj. Gen. John M. Schofield. It consisted of 34,000 men, made up of the IV Corps under Maj. Gen. David S. Stanley, the XXIII Corps under Brig. Gen. Jacob D. Cox, and a Cavalry Corps commanded by Maj. Gen. James H. Wilson. Thomas had an additional 26,000 men at Nashville and scattered around his department. (Note: Although Thomas and Schofield were the commanders of the Army of the Cumberland and the Army of the Ohio, respectively, through 1865, historians of the campaign do not always use these designations for the combination of corps assembled against Hood, referring in some cases only to the "Federal Army." See, for example, Welcher, vol. II, pp. 599, 611; Sword, p. 448; Jacobson, p. 452.)

== Confederate attacks on Sherman's supply line ==
Map of the Franklin–Nashville campaign Confederate Union

So far, the Confederate strategy was working, because Sherman was being forced to disperse his strength to maintain his lines of communication. Hood's movements attracted a lot of attention in the press in the north and caused the War Department no small concern. Washington, DC insisted that Sherman deal with Hood's threat. However, Sherman was not about to fall into Hood's trap completely. He intended to provide Thomas with sufficient strength to cope with Forrest and Hood, while he completed plans to strike out for Savannah. On September 29, Hood began his advance across the Chattahoochee River, heading to the northwest with 40,000 men to threaten the Western & Atlantic Railroad, Sherman's supply line. On October 1, Hood's cavalry was intercepted by Union cavalry under Brig. Gens. Judson Kilpatrick and Kenner Garrard in a raid on the railroad near Marietta, but Sherman was still uncertain of Hood's location. For the next three weeks, Sherman had difficulty keeping abreast of Hood's movements. Hood moved rapidly, screened his march, and maintained the initiative. The Union cavalry, which Sherman had neglected to train adequately, had a difficult time following Hood and reporting his movements. (Note: Sword and Welcher state that the best horses were reserved by Sherman for his March to the Sea.)

On October 3, the day that Thomas arrived in Nashville, Stewart's corps captured Big Shanty (present-day Kennesaw) with its garrison of 175 men, and the following day Acworth, with an additional 250. Sherman left Maj. Gen. Henry W. Slocum in Atlanta and moved toward Marietta with a force of about 55,000 men. Hood split his force, sending the majority of his command to Dallas, Georgia. The remainder, a division under Maj. Gen. Samuel G. French, moved along the railroad toward Allatoona.

== Allatoona (October 5) ==
The small Federal garrison at Allatoona, a partial brigade, was commanded by Colonel John Tourtellotte. Before the Southern division arrived, Sherman sent a reinforcement brigade with Brig. Gen. John M. Corse, who took command of both brigades. The Federal troops occupied strong defensive positions in two earthen redoubts on each side of a 180-foot, 65 feet deep railroad cut and many of the men, including the entire 7th Illinois, were armed with Henry repeating rifles.

Major General Samuel Gibbs French's division arrived near Allatoona at sunrise on Wednesday, October 5. After a two-hour artillery bombardment, French sent a demand for surrender, which Corse refused. French then launched his brigades in an attack—one from the north (against the rear of the fortifications) and two from the west. Corse's men survived the sustained two-hour attack against the main fortification, the Star Fort on the western side of the railroad cut, but were pinned down and Tourtellotte sent reinforcements from the eastern fort. Under heavy pressure, it seemed inevitable that the Federals would be forced to surrender, but by noon French received a false report from his cavalry that a strong Union force was approaching from Acworth, so he reluctantly withdrew at 2:00 p.m. Allatoona was a relatively small, but bloody battle with high percentages of casualties.

== Resaca, Dalton, and the movement into Alabama ==
Hood then moved to the west and crossed the Coosa River in the vicinity of Rome, Georgia, near the Alabama state line. He turned north in the direction of Resaca, Georgia, and joined with Maj. Gen. Joseph Wheeler's cavalry, which had been previously raiding in Tennessee. On Wednesday, October 12 (a week after Allatoona ), Hood demanded the surrender of the Union brigade stationed at Resaca and left Lt. Gen. Stephen D. Lee's corps there to invest the city. The 700 Union men under Colonel Clark R. Weaver refused Hood's ultimatum to surrender, which warned that no prisoners would be taken. Weaver replied "In my opinion I can hold this post. If you want it, come and take it." Hood declined to attack the Union position because he believed that it would be too costly, instead bypassing the city, moving north, and continuing the destruction of the railroad.

Meanwhile, Sherman had learned of Hood's location and ordered reinforcements sent to Resaca, arriving there on October 13, too late to engage Hood in battle. Hood sent Lt. Gen. Alexander P. Stewart as far north as Tunnel Hill, near the Tennessee state line, to damage the railroad as much as possible. During this operation, on October 13, Stewart captured the Federal garrison at Dalton, Georgia, under ugly circumstances. The 751 men under Colonel Lewis Johnson included a large number of African-American soldiers, a sight that enraged many in Hood's army. In surrender negotiations, Johnson insisted that his black troops be treated as prisoners of war, but Hood replied that "all slaves belonging to persons in the Confederacy" would be returned to their masters. Unable to defend the garrison, Johnson surrendered and 600 black soldiers were stripped of their shoes and some clothing and marched to the railroad, where they were forced to tear up about 2 miles of track under the supervision of Maj. Gen. William B. Bate's division. Six of the Union soldiers were shot for refusing to work or being unable to keep up with the march. Colonel Johnson later wrote that the abuse his men received "exceeded anything in brutality I have ever witnessed." Johnson and his white officers were paroled the following day, but some of his black soldiers were returned to slavery. (Note: Again, the army was motivated to adhere to the existing social hierarchy of white supremacy anchored in slavery.)

From Resaca, Hood withdrew on a six-day march to the west toward Gadsden, Alabama, reaching it on Thursday, October 20. He had hoped to engage Sherman in battle near LaFayette, Georgia, but his subordinate commanders convinced him that their troops' morale was not ready to risk an attack. He considered his campaign a success so far, having destroyed 24 miles of railroad, although this turned out to be a fleeting advantage to the South. Sherman deployed as many as 10,000 men in reconstruction and by October 28 regular rail service resumed between Chattanooga and Atlanta. Sherman pursued Hood only as far as Gaylesville, Alabama, over 30 miles short of Gadsden.

Hood began to focus his strategy. He needed to prevent Thomas's army from reuniting with Sherman and overwhelming him, and he calculated that if he moved swiftly into Tennessee, he might be able to defeat Thomas before the Union forces could be reassembled. After Thomas was eliminated, Hood planned to move into central Kentucky and replenish his army with recruits from there and Tennessee. He hoped to accomplish all of this before Sherman could reach him. His plan was that if Sherman followed him, Hood would fight him in Kentucky; from there he planned to move eastward through the Cumberland Gap to aid Robert E. Lee, who was besieged at Petersburg. One of his goals was to take Nashville which had been under federal control since 1862. The historian, Eric Jacobson has written that by this time in the war, the Army of Tennessee also realized that the war had become a war of extermination for them. (Note: Extermination in the sense of not the extermination of the Confederate people but of the southern society in which, whether slave owners or not, all members of the Rebel armies had a stake in the hierarchy built on race.) On October 21, Hood's plan received the reluctant approval of Gen. Beauregard, who was concerned about the daunting logistical challenges of an invasion. Beauregard insisted that Wheeler's cavalry be detached to monitor Sherman, and assigned Nathan Bedford Forrest's cavalry to Hood's advance. Hood set out toward Decatur, Alabama, with the intention of meeting up with Forrest in the vicinity of Florence, from where they would march north into Tennessee.

By this time, Sherman had received an indication from Grant that he was favorably considering the march to Savannah. He set his mind on the short-term goal of pursuing the swiftly moving Hood. He directed Thomas to come forward from Nashville to block Hood's advance. To bolster Thomas's effort, Sherman ordered the IV Corps under Stanley to Chattanooga and the XXIII Corps under Schofield to Nashville, as well as Maj. Gen. Andrew J. Smith's XVI Corps from Missouri to Nashville. By November 10, the remainder of Sherman's troops were en route back to Atlanta.

== Forrest's West Tennessee raid (October 16 – November 16) ==
One of the critical Federal supply lines in Tennessee was to use the Tennessee River, offload supplies at Johnsonville, and then ship them by rail to Nashville. Lt. Gen. Richard Taylor ordered Maj. Gen. Nathan Bedford Forrest on a cavalry raid through Western Tennessee to destroy that supply line. The first of Forrest's men began to ride on Sunday, October 16; Forrest himself began moving north eight days later, on Monday, October 24 and reached Fort Heiman on the Tennessee River on Friday, October 28, where he emplaced artillery. On October 29 and October 30, his artillery fire caused the capture of three steamers and two gunboats. Forrest repaired two of the boats, Undine and Venus, to use as a small flotilla to aid in his attack on Johnsonville. On November 2, Forrest's flotilla was challenged by two Union gunboats, Key West and Tawah, and Venus was run aground and captured. The Federals dispatched six more gunboats from Paducah, Kentucky, and on Wednesday, November 3 they engaged in artillery duels with strong Confederate positions on either end of Reynoldsburg Island, near Johnsonville. The Federal fleet had difficulty attempting to subdue these positions and were occupied as Forrest prepared his force for the attack on Johnsonville.

On the morning of November 4, Undine and the Confederate batteries were attacked by three Union gunboats from Johnsonville and the six Paducah gunboats. Undine was abandoned and set on fire, which caused her ammunition magazine to explode, ending Forrest's brief career as a naval commander. Despite this loss, the Confederate land artillery was completely effective in neutralizing the threat of the Federal fleets. Forrest's guns bombarded the Union supply depot and the 28 steamboats and barges positioned at the wharf. All three of the Union gunboats were disabled or destroyed. The Union garrison commander ordered that the supply vessels be burned to prevent their capture by the Confederates.

Forrest had caused enormous damage at very low cost. He reported only 2 men killed and 9 wounded. He described the Union losses as 4 gunboats, 14 transports, 20 barges, 26 pieces of artillery, $6,700,000 worth of property, and 150 prisoners. One Union officer described the monetary loss as about $2,200,000. Forrest's command, delayed by heavy rains, proceeded to Perryville, Tennessee, and eventually reached Corinth, Mississippi, on Thursday, November 10. During the raid, on November 3, Beauregard designated Forrest's cavalry for assignment to Hood's Army of Tennessee. Hood elected to delay his advance from Florence to Tuscumbia until Forrest was able to link up with him on November 16.

== Decatur (October 26–29) ==
Hood departed from Gadsden on Saturday, October 22, en route to Guntersville, Alabama, where he planned to cross the Tennessee River. Learning that that crossing place was strongly guarded, and concerned that Federal gunboats could destroy any pontoon bridge he might deploy, he impulsively changed his destination to Decatur, 40 miles west. When Hood arrived at Decatur on October 26, he found that a Federal infantry force of 3–5,000 men was defending an entrenched line that included two forts and 1,600 yards of rifle pits. Two Federal wooden gunboats patrolled the river. On Friday, October 28, Confederate skirmishers advanced through a dense fog to a ravine within 800 yards of the main fortifications. Around noon, a small Federal detachment drove the sharpshooters and skirmishers out of the ravine, capturing 125 men. Hood, concluding that he could not afford the casualties that would ensue from a full-scale assault, withdrew his army. He decided once again to move to the west, to attempt another crossing near Tuscumbia, Alabama, where Muscle Shoals would prevent interference by Federal gunboats.

== Columbia (November 24–29) ==
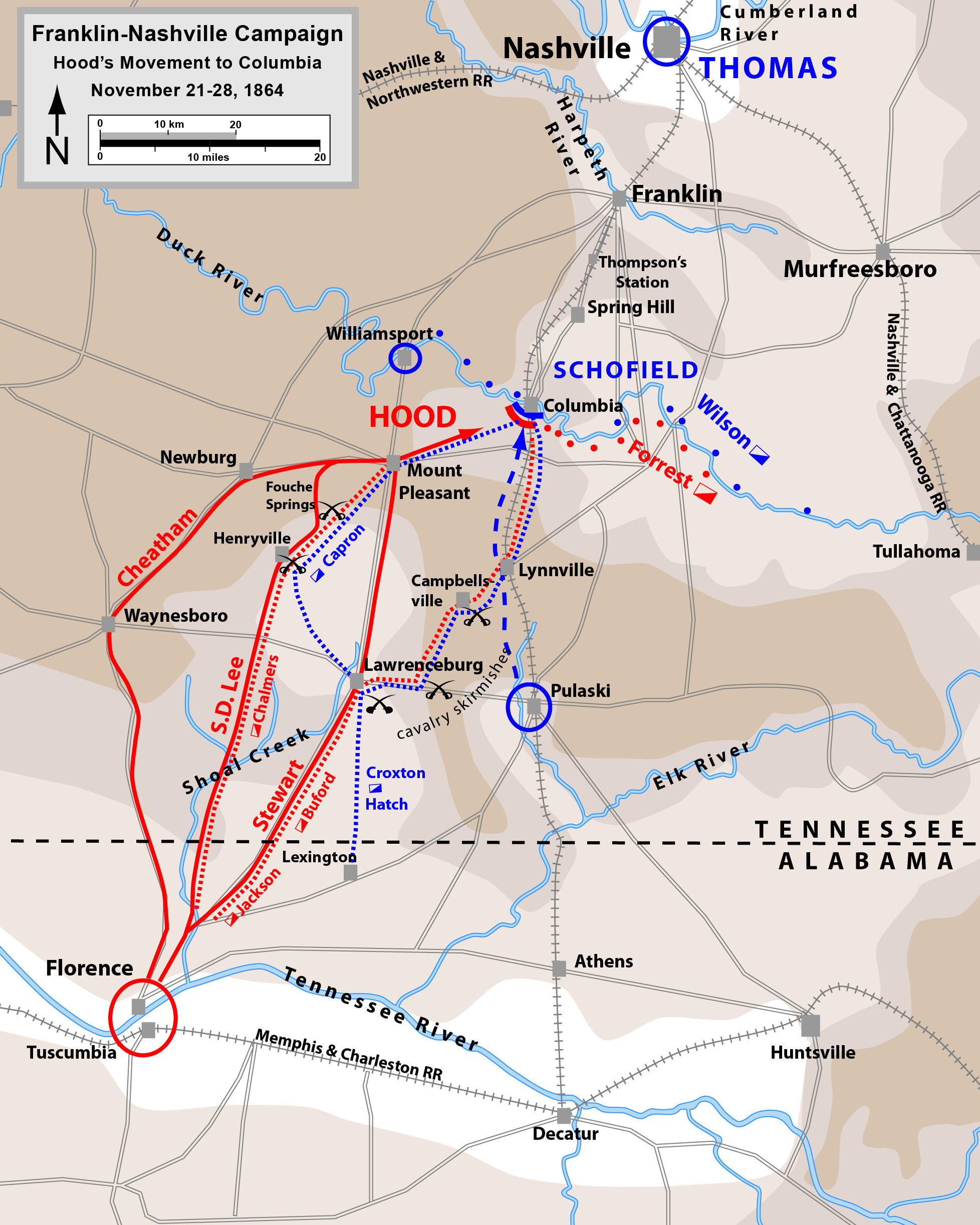
Hood's advance from Florence to Columbia

Hood waited for Forrest at Tuscumbia for almost three weeks while his commissary officers attempted to provide 20 days supply of rations for the upcoming campaign. This was a difficult assignment because the supply line was tenuous, requiring transport on two railroads, followed by 15 miles on poor roads to Tuscumbia, using wagons pulled by undernourished horses and oxen. Hood transferred his headquarters to Florence on the morning of November 13 and Maj. Gen. Benjamin F. Cheatham's corps marched across the river that day with the army's supply trains and cattle following on Monday, November 14. Heavy rains during this period made travel on the roads difficult. The final corps, under Lt. Gen. Alexander P. Stewart, crossed the Tennessee on the following Sunday, November 20.

On November 16, Hood received word that Sherman was about to depart Atlanta for his March to the Sea. Beauregard urged Hood to take immediate action in an attempt to distract Sherman's advance, emphasizing the importance of moving before Thomas could consolidate his forces. Both Sherman and Thomas considered it likely that Hood would follow Sherman through Georgia. Although Thomas received intelligence that Hood was amassing supplies for a movement north, he discounted most of it—heavy rains during November made the roads almost impassable. By 8:00 a.m., Monday, November 21, however, Thomas had evidence that all three of Hood's corps were in motion and he directed Schofield to withdraw gradually to the north to protect Columbia before Hood could seize it. Schofield arrived at Pulaski on the night of November 13 and assumed command of all forces there, including the IV Corps. Thomas remained concerned that 10,000 troops from the XVI Corps, commanded by Maj. Gen. Andrew J. Smith, had not arrived as promised reinforcements from Missouri.

In Tennessee [Hood] groped for some grandiose scheme—the capture of Nashville, a march on Cincinnati, a crossing of the Ohio. Repeatedly, since reaching North Georgia in October, he had changed his objective, not because of unexpected Federal moves as much as because he had no real objective save that long-lasting Confederate dream that victory—and perhaps fame as well—lay along the Ohio River.

— Thomas L. Connelly, Autumn of Glory

Hood's army departed Florence on November 21, marching in three columns, with Cheatham on the left, Lee in the center, and Stewart on the right, all screened by Forrest's cavalry. Hood's plan was to consolidate at Mount Pleasant and from there move to the east to cut off Schofield before he could reach Columbia and the Duck River. The rapid forced march 70 miles north was under miserable conditions, with freezing winds and sleet, which made progress difficult for the underfed and underclothed army. Nevertheless, Hood's men were in good spirits as they returned to Tennessee.

Because of Forrest's relentless screening, Schofield had no idea where the Confederate Army was headed. The aggressive Forrest had a slight advantage over his Union cavalry opponents, commanded by Maj. Gen. James H. Wilson. Wilson had arrived from the Eastern Theater in late October to reorganize and command Thomas's cavalry, but he possessed only 4,800 horsemen ready to oppose Forrest, compared to Forrest's between 5,000 and 6,000 men. The Confederate cavalry advanced to Mount Pleasant by November 23. Brig. Gen. John T. Croxton's brigade, the initial Federal cavalry force, was reinforced with a division under Brig. Gen. Edward Hatch and a brigade under Colonel Horace Capron.

Forrest kept up the pressure and on Wednesday, November 23, heavy skirmishing occurred from Henryville to the outskirts of Mount Pleasant. To the east, Forrest's divisions under Brig. Gens. Abraham Buford II and William H. Jackson forced Hatch's division out of the Lawrenceburg area and drove them back toward Pulaski. Early on November 24, Schofield began marching his two infantry corps north to Columbia. Forrest pursued aggressively with part of the division of Brig. Gen. James R. Chalmers, who occupied Mount Pleasant and hit Capron's men repeatedly as he forced them north. Buford and Jackson drove Hatch north toward Lynnville and captured a number of prisoners, but the Confederate cavalry was unable to prevent the division of Brig. Gen. Cox from reaching Columbia. Stanley's corps completed a 30-mile march from Pulaski to reinforce him. Together they began constructing an arc of trenches just south of the town.

On the morning of November 24, Forrest's cavalry began probing attacks in an attempt to break through two lines of fortifications. The Confederates bombarded the lines with artillery and a number of skirmishes occurred, but it became apparent to the Union defenders that only a single infantry division with some dismounted cavalry were participating in the attacks and that Hood was merely demonstrating, intending to cross the Duck River either upstream or downstream and cut off the Union force from Thomas, who was assembling the remainder of his force in Nashville.

On the morning of November 26, Schofield received an order from Thomas to hold the north bank of the Duck River until reinforcements under A. J. Smith could arrive from Nashville. Schofield planned to move his trains during the day and his infantry overnight, using a railroad bridge and a recently installed pontoon bridge, but heavy rains that day made approaches to the bridge impassable. That evening, the bulk of the Army of Tennessee reached the fortifications south of Columbia.

== Spring Hill (November 29) ==
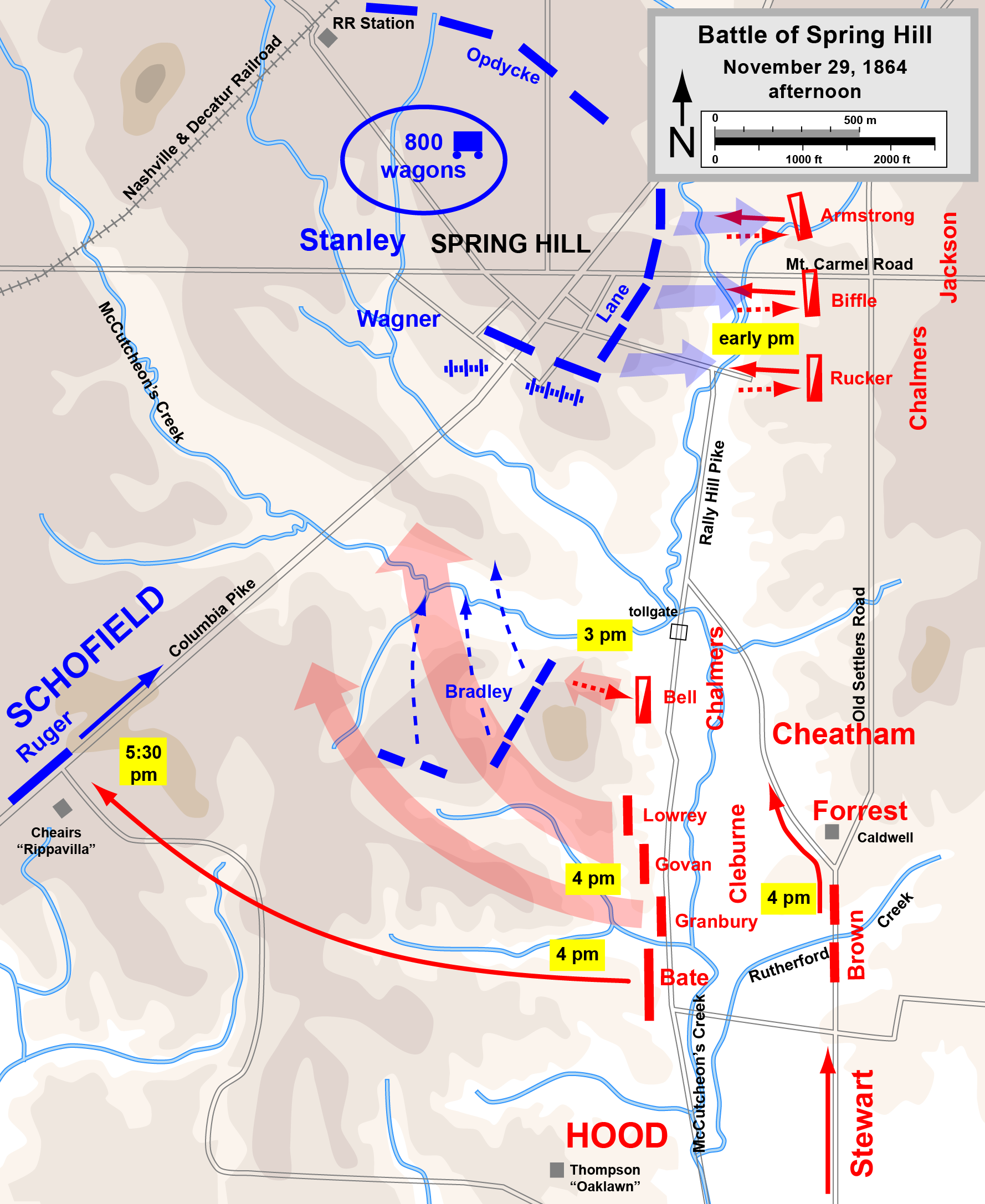
Actions at Spring Hill, afternoon, November 29, 1864

On Monday, November 28, Forrest crossed the river east of town against little resistance from the Union cavalry; the Southern cavalrymen had deceived Wilson and drawn his force to the northeast and away from the action. On the same day, Thomas directed Schofield to begin preparations for a withdrawal north to Franklin. He was expecting (incorrectly) that A. J. Smith's arrival from Missouri was imminent and he wanted the combined force to defend against Hood on the line of the Harpeth River at Franklin instead of the Duck River. Schofield sent his 800-wagon supply train out in front, guarded by part of the IV Corps division of Brig. Gen. George D. Wagner.

On November 29 Hood sent Cheatham's and Stewart's corps on a flanking march north, crossing the Duck River at Davis's Ford east of Columbia while two divisions of Lee's corps and most of the army's artillery remained on the southern bank to deceive Schofield into thinking a general assault was planned against Columbia. Hood, riding near the head of the column with Cheatham's corps, planned to interpose his army between Schofield and Thomas, hoping to defeat Schofield as the Federals retreated north from Columbia. Stewart's corps followed Cheatham, and they were followed by the division of Maj. Gen. Edward "Allegheny" Johnson (Lee's corps). The rest of Lee's corps remained south of Columbia, demonstrating with artillery fire against Schofield's men north of the Duck. (Note: Some sources conclude that Hood's actual plan was to outrace Schofield to Nashville, not intercept him. Jacobson and Rupp state official records show that he planned on attacking Schofield before he could unite with Thomas.)

Cavalry skirmishing between Wilson's and Forrest's troopers had occurred throughout the day on Monday and continued on Tuesday. Forrest's wide turning movement with 4,000 troopers had forced Wilson north to Hurt's Corner, preventing the U.S. horsemen from interfering with Hood's infantry advance. By 10:00 a.m., on Tuesday, November 29, Forrest ordered his men to turn west toward Spring Hill. Wilson had sent multiple messages to Schofield warning of Hood's advance, but it was not until earlier that day, Tuesday, at dawn on November 29, that Schofield believed the reports and realized the predicament he was in. He sent Stanley north with portions of the IV Corps to protect the trains, but also to hold the crossroads at Spring Hill to allow the entire army to withdraw safely to Franklin. Forrest's cavalrymen ran into pickets from the IV Corps; Stanley had moved north rapidly and formed up positions with Wagner's division that protected the village of Spring Hill on three sides. The brigade of Colonel John Quincy Lane rushed forward and pushed back the dismounted cavalrymen. Forrest inexplicably never realized that his opponents had changed from cavalry to massed infantry, failing his mission as the eyes and ears of Hood. He also halted any further advance to wait for the arrival of Cheatham's infantry.

Maj. Gen. Patrick R. Cleburne's division of Cheatham's corps arrived around 3:45 p.m. on Forrest's left. His mission was to intercept the Columbia Pike to block Schofield's withdrawal. The cavalrymen, low on ammunition, pulled out of the line and moved north to be ready to cover a further advance of Hood's army. As Cleburne advanced, despite Forrest's presence on the field, he had no knowledge that to his right was a brigade of U.S. infantry (Bradley's) in a battle line. When his right flank was taken by surprise by heavy fire, he wheeled his division to the right, away from the road, to face the new threat.

Back in Columbia, Schofield became convinced at about 3:00 p.m. that the Confederates would not attack him there and he began marching his men to Spring Hill. As soon as the initial units departed, Stephen D. Lee coincidentally began an attack against the Union position. By the time the bulk of his two divisions were able to cross, the senior Union commander left behind at Columbia, Brig. Gen. Cox, began his withdrawal and the final troops departed up the Franklin Pike by 10:00 pm.

Cleburne's 3,000 men began an attack against Bradley's brigade at about 4:00 p.m. Whereas Cheatham was expecting Cleburne to drive north into Spring Hill, Hood's intention was to use this formation to sweep toward the turnpike and wheel left to intercept Schofield's arriving units. Cleburne wheeled his brigades into a northern alignment against Bradley's right flank, causing Bradley and his outnumbered men to withdraw. Cleburne's two brigades chased them vigorously, and they were stopped short of the turnpike only by heavy fire from the IV Corps artillery.

The first command miscommunication of the battle took place upon Hood's arrival. Cheatham had ordered his division under Maj. Gen. William B. Bate to move against Spring Hill in concert with Cleburne, forming up on the Irishman's left. Hood then personally ordered Bate to move towards the Columbia Pike and "sweep toward Columbia." Neither Bate nor Hood bothered to inform Cheatham of this change in orders. At about 5:30 p.m., Bate's lead element of sharpshooters fired on a Federal column approaching from their left— this was the lead brigade of Maj. Gen. Thomas H. Ruger's division of the XXIII Corps. Ruger was riding with Schofield and could see Bate's men drawn up in line to attack and occupy the pike. As the two generals watched unseen by the Rebels, they saw the enemy battle line withdraw in the dusk. Before the Bate could engage in battle, an officer from Cheatham's staff arrived to insist that he follow Cheatham's original orders and join Cleburne's attack. Late that night, Bate reported the contact with the Federal column traveling up the Columbia Pike, but Cheatham discounted the importance of the encounter.

By this time, Cheatham's division under Maj. Gen. John C. Brown was moved into position for another attack on Spring Hill, on Cleburne's right. Brown did not attack, however. It was reported that there were Union troops in position on his right flank and front and that Forrest's cavalrymen, promised to protect his right flank, did not seem to be present. Brown decided to consult with his corps commander before proceeding, sending two staff officers to find Cheatham and halting his troops while he awaited a decision. By the time Cheatham and Brown were able to speak, the battlefield was in total darkness, and the two officers decided that an assault conducted then without knowing the condition of their right flank might be a disaster. (Note: Cheatham, Cleburne, and Brown had conducted a disastrous night attack at Chickamauga a year prior and were understandably wary of an attack in the dark, especially in light of the fact that the night was a new moon and very dark.) Hood was furious that the attack had not proceeded as he intended and that the pike was still open. He dispatched a staff officer to find Stewart to assist Cheatham. Having been up since 3:00 a.m., Hood went to bed at 9:00 p.m., confident that whatever setbacks his army had suffered during the day, they would be able to correct them in the morning and bag Schofield.

The Battle of Spring Hill was a minor affair in terms of casualties—about 350 Union and 500 Confederate—but the result of miscommunication, simple bad military management, and the capable leadership in the U.S. forces was that during the night all of Schofield's command, including Cox, passed from Columbia through Spring Hill while the Confederate commanders slept. The passage of the army did not go unnoticed by some of the soldiers, but no concerted effort was made to block the pike. Confederate cavalry attempted to block the passage of the supply trains north of Spring Hill, at Thompson's Station, but accompanying Federal infantry drove them off. A private soldier woke up the commanding general at 2:00 a.m. and reported he saw the Union column moving north, but Hood did nothing beyond sending a dispatch to Cheatham to fire on passing traffic.

By 6:00 a.m. on Wednesday, November 30, all of Schofield's army was well north of Spring Hill and its vanguard had reached Franklin, where it began to build breastworks south of town. In the morning Hood discovered Schofield's escape, and after an angry conference with his subordinate commanders in which he blamed all but himself for the failure, ordered his army to resume its pursuit. Spring Hill had been, arguably, Hood's best chance to isolate and defeat the Union army and recriminations for the lost opportunity soon began flying. Hood believed that Cheatham was most responsible. Historians Thomas L. Connelly, Eric Jacobson, and Wiley Sword have each assigned blame to both Hood and Cheatham, but Jacobson has also stressed that equally, Schofield's and his subordinates' leadership and ability exploited these failures to wrest the initiative from Hood and complete their withdrawal.

== Battle of Franklin (November 30) ==
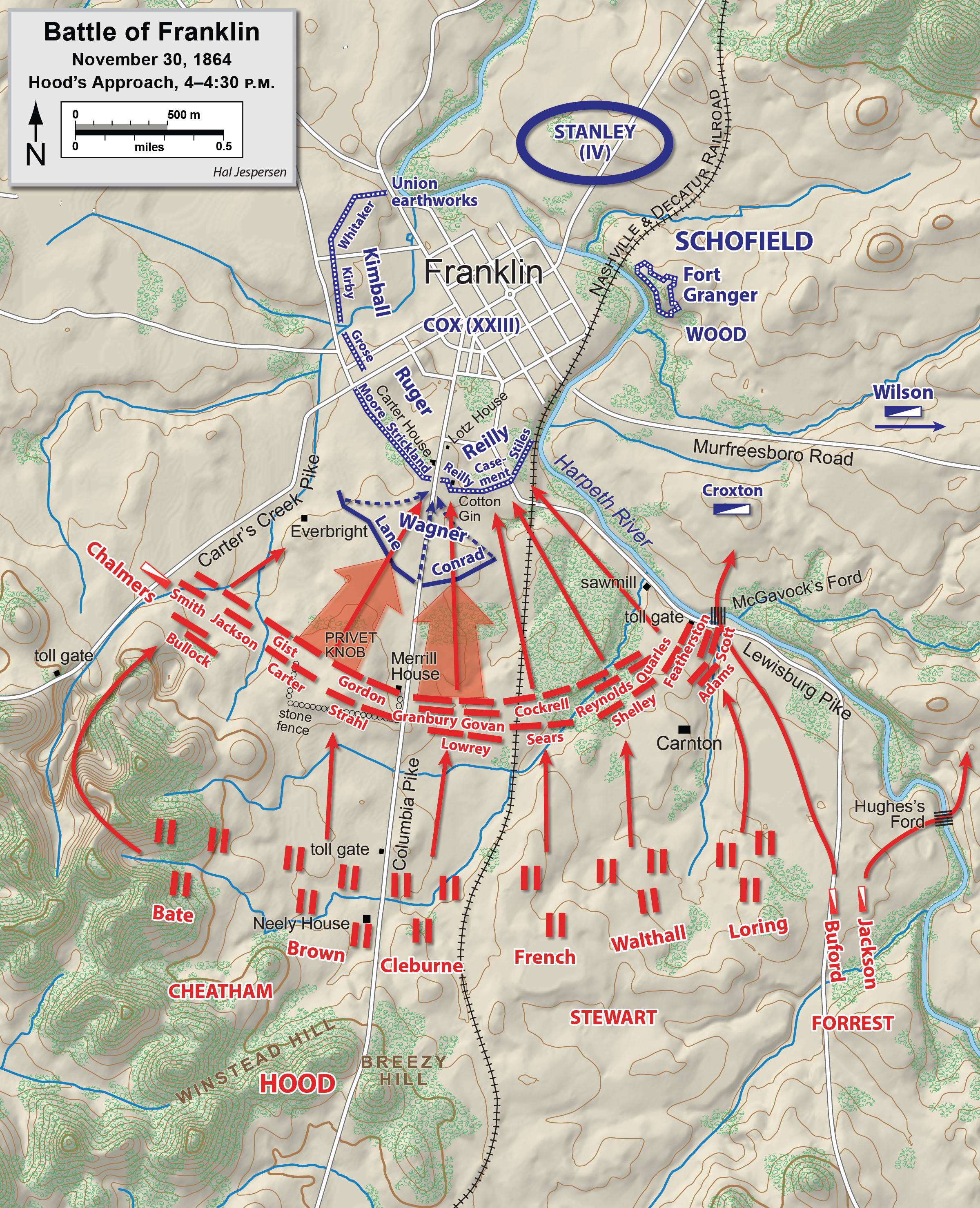
Hood's approach and attacks against Wagner's advanced line

Schofield's advance guard arrived in Franklin at about 4:30 a.m. on Wednesday, November 30. Jacob Cox, a division commander temporarily commanding the XXIII Corps, immediately began preparing strong defensive positions around the deteriorated entrenchments originally constructed for a previous engagement in 1863. Schofield decided to defend at Franklin with his back to the river because he had no pontoon bridges available that would enable his men to cross the river. Many described the day with clear afternoon skies and temperatures in the high fifties as a beautiful "Indian summer afternoon." Schofield needed time to repair the permanent bridges spanning the river, but by mid-afternoon, nearly all the supply wagons were across the Harpeth and on the road to Nashville.

By 12:00 p.m. the Union works formed an approximate semicircle around the town. A gap in the line occurred where the Columbia Pike entered the outskirts of the town, left open to allow passage of the wagons. Just behind the center of the formidable line stood the Carter House, appropriated as Cox's headquarters. Brig. Gen. Stanley had ordered Wagner to maintain a rear guard on Winstead Hill and relieve his third brigade under Colonel Emerson Opdycke who were further south. Wagner was to stay on the hill until dusk or pressed by the Rebels. Wagner, perhaps misunderstanding his orders, ordered his three brigades to stop halfway to the Union line and dig in as best they could on the flat ground a few hundred yards in front of the main line. (Note: Jacobson writes that Wagner actually was performing his proper duty as the army's rear guard. The position allowed him to observe Hood's forces whose infantry, through a feat of endurance, had managed to march to a point where they were close behind. Wagner's error, in his opinion, was that he waited too long to order a withdrawal to the main line.) Colonel Emerson Opdycke considered Wagner's order to be ridiculous and had already been directed by Stanley into the works; he marched his brigade through the Union line and into a reserve position behind the gap through which the Columbia Pike passed, leaving the brigades of Colonels John Q. Lane, and Joseph Conrad in front.

Hood's army began to arrive on Winstead Hill, two miles (3 km) south of Franklin. Around 1:00 p.m. Hood ordered a frontal assault in the dwindling afternoon light—sunset would be at 4:30 p.m. that day—against the Union force, a decision that caused dismay among his top generals. Some popular histories, in the Lost Cause tradition, assert that Hood acted rashly in a fit of rage, resentful that the Federal army had slipped past his troops the night before at Spring Hill and that he wanted to discipline his army by ordering them to assault against strong odds. Recent scholarship by Eric Jacobson discounts this as unlikely, as it was not only militarily foolish, but Hood was observed to be determined, not angry, by the time he arrived in Franklin. (Note: Jacobsob also cites that Hood's immediate attack was much in keeping with his experiences in the Army of Northern Virginia; aggressiveness always seemed to be rewarded with a retaking of the initiative. In contrast, for examples of the popular view promoting Hood's anger and resentment, see Sword, p. 179, McPherson, pp. 188–189, and Nevin, pp. 95–96.)

Regardless of Hood's personal motivations, his specific objective was to try to crush Schofield before he and his troops could escape to Nashville. In addition, his army, angry at the missed opportunity saw an opponent that for a change did not outnumber them and were eager to destroy them. The Confederates began moving forward at 4:00 p.m., with Cheatham's corps on the left of the assault and Stewart's on the right. Lee's corps, and almost all of the army's artillery, had not yet arrived from Columbia. Hood's attacking force, about 19–20,000 men, was arguably understrength for the mission he assigned—traversing two miles of open ground uphill with only two batteries of artillery support and then assaulting prepared, albeit hastily, fortifications.

Hood's attack initially enveloped the 3,000 men in Wagner's two brigades under Lane and Conrad, which attempted to stand their ground behind inadequate fieldworks and without anchored flanks, but quickly collapsed under the pressure. Many of the veteran soldiers of the two brigades stampeded back on the Columbia Pike to the main breastworks, while some untried replacements were reluctant to move under fire and were captured. The fleeing troops were closely pursued by the Confederates and the two sides became so intermingled that defenders in the breastworks had to hold their fire to avoid hitting their comrades.

The U.S. forces' momentary inability to defend the opening in the works caused a weak spot in its line at the Columbia Pike from the Carter House to the cotton gin. Hood's aggressiveness seemed to be paying off. The Confederate divisions of Cleburne, Brown, and French converged on this front and a number of their troops broke through the now not-so-solid Federal defenses on either side. In a matter of minutes, the Confederates had penetrated 50 yards through the center of the Federal line.

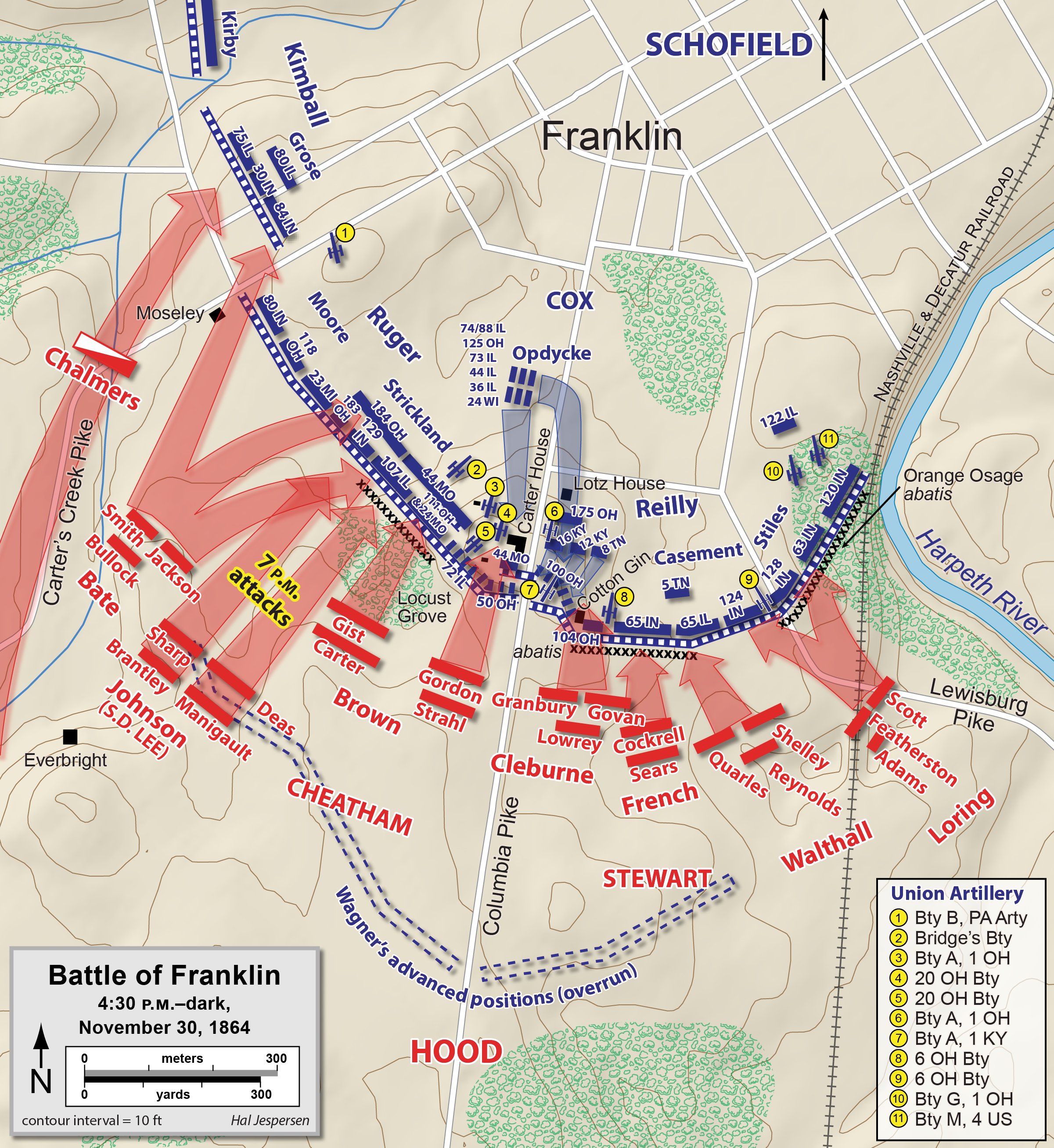
Confederate attacks

As the Confederates began their attack, Opdycke's brigade was in reserve. He quickly positioned his men into line of battle and ordered his brigade forward to the works. Firing continued around the Carter house and gardens for hours. At the same time as Opdycke's counterattack west of the pike, the reserve elements of Reilly's division (the 12th Kentucky Infantry, 16th Kentucky Infantry, and 175th Ohio Infantry Regiment (Note: The 175th Ohio was a green regiment that had only been formed in October 1864.)) had stood their ground and served as a rally line for survivors of Strickland's and Wagner's divisions. Together they sealed the breach. Hand-to-hand fighting around the Carter House and the pike was furious and desperate, employing such weapons as bayonets, rifle butts, entrenching tools, axes, and picks. Many Confederates were driven back to the Federal earthworks, where many were pinned down for the remainder of the evening, unable to either advance or flee. Brown's division suffered significant losses, including Brown, who was wounded, and all four of his brigade commanders were casualties. Brown's brigade attack near the cotton gin was driven back from the breastworks and was then subjected to devastating cross fire from Reilly's brigade to their front and the brigade of Colonel John S. Casement, on Reilly's right. Cleburne was killed in the attack and 14 of his brigade and regimental commanders were casualties.

While fighting raged at the center of the Union line, Stewart's Corps also advanced against the Union left. Because the Harpeth River flowed in that area from southeast to northwest, the brigade found themselves moving through a space getting progressively narrower, squeezing brigades together into a compressed front, delaying their movements and reducing their unit cohesion. They were all subjected to fierce artillery fire not only from the main Union line, but also from the batteries across the river at Fort Granger. And they had significant difficulty pushing through the strong Osage-orange abatis.

Loring's division launched two attacks against the Union brigade of Colonel Israel N. Stiles and both were repulsed with heavy losses. Artillery firing canister rounds directly down the railroad cut prevented any attempt to flank the Union position. Brig. Gen. John Adams attempted to rally his brigade by galloping his horse directly onto the earthworks, but he and his horse were both shot and killed. The brigade of Brig. Gen. Winfield S. Featherston began falling back under heavy fire when its division commander, Maj. Gen. William W. Loring, confronted them, shouting, "Great God! Do I command cowards?" He attempted to inspire his men by sitting on his horse in full view of the Federal lines for over a minute and amazingly emerged unharmed, but the brigade made no further progress. Walthall's division struck Casement's and Reilly's brigades in multiple waves of brigade assaults—probably as many as six distinct attacks. All of these assaults were turned back with heavy losses.

Maj. Gen. William B. Bate's division attacked on the Union right flank. His left flank was not being protected as he expected by Chalmers's cavalry division, and they received enfilade fire. To protect the flank, Bate ordered the Florida Brigade to move from its reserve position to his left flank. This not only delayed the advance, but provided only a single line to attack the Union fortifications, leaving no reserve. Chalmers's troopers had actually engaged the Federal right by this time, fighting dismounted, but Bate was unaware of it because the two forces were separated by rolling ground and orchards. Neither Bate nor Chalmers made any progress and they withdrew. Hood was still convinced that he could pierce the Federal line. At about 7:00 p.m., he deployed the only division of Stephen D. Lee's corps that had arrived, commanded by Maj. Gen. Edward "Allegheny" Johnson, to assist Cheatham's effort. They were repulsed after a single assault with heavy losses.

In addition to Chalmers's actions in the west, across the river to the east Confederate cavalry commander Forrest attempted to turn the Union left. Union cavalry commander Brig. Gen. James H. Wilson learned at 3:00 p.m. that Forrest was crossing the river, he ordered his division under Brig. Gen. Edward Hatch to move south from his position on the Brentwood Turnpike and attack Forrest from the front. He ordered Brig. Gen. John T. Croxton's brigade to move against Forrest's flank and held Colonel Thomas J. Harrison's brigade in reserve. The dismounted cavalrymen of Hatch's division charged the Confederate cavalrymen, also dismounted, and drove them back across the river.

Following the failure of Johnson's assault, Hood decided to end offensive actions for the evening and began to plan for a resumed series of attacks in the morning. Schofield ordered his infantry to cross the river, starting at 11:00 p.m. Although there was a period in which the Union army was vulnerable, outside its works and straddling the river, Hood did not attempt to take advantage of it during the night. The Union army began entering the breastworks at Nashville at noon on December 1, with Hood's damaged army in pursuit.

The devastated Confederate force was left in control of Franklin, but its enemy had escaped again. Although he had briefly come close to breaking through in the vicinity of the Columbia Turnpike, Hood was unable to destroy Schofield or prevent his withdrawal to link up with Thomas in Nashville. And his unsuccessful result came with a frightful cost. The Confederates suffered 6,252 casualties, including 1,750 killed and 3,800 wounded. An estimated 2,000 others suffered less serious wounds and returned to duty before the Battle of Nashville. But more importantly, the military leadership in the West was decimated, including the loss of perhaps the best division commander of either side, Patrick Cleburne. Fourteen Confederate generals (six killed or mortally wounded, seven wounded, and one captured) and 55 regimental commanders were casualties. (Note: Jacobson presents a full list of all of the officers who were casualties during the battle.)

Union losses were reported as only 189 killed, 1,033 wounded, and 1,104 missing. It is possible that the number of casualties was under-reported by Schofield because of the confusion during his army's hasty nighttime evacuation of Franklin. (Note: Current unpublished research by Carter House historian David Fraley has identified Union killed at Franklin to be in excess of 600 and perhaps as many as 800. However, this list may include men who had fought at Franklin and died in captivity or in the Sultana explosion in April 1865.) The Union wounded were left behind in Franklin.

== Pursuit to Nashville ==
The Army of Tennessee was all but destroyed at Franklin. Nevertheless, rather than retreat and risk the army dissolving through desertions, Hood advanced his 26,500 man force against the Union army now combined under Thomas, firmly entrenched at Nashville. This was a controversial move on Hood's part because his army was enervated and no longer ready for offensive operations. However, he believed that if he ordered a retreat, it would mean the complete disintegration of his army. Hood decided that destruction of the Nashville & Chattanooga Railroad and disruption of the Union army supply depot at Murfreesboro would help his cause. On December 4 he sent Forrest, with two cavalry divisions and Maj. Gen. William B. Bate's infantry division, to Murfreesboro. Hood ordered Bate to destroy the railroad and blockhouses between Murfreesboro and Nashville and join Forrest for further operations.

== Forrest at Murfreesboro (December 5–6) ==
Forrest's combined command attacked Murfreesboro but was repulsed. They destroyed railroad track, blockhouses, and some homes and generally disrupted Union operations in the area, but they did not accomplish much else. The raid on Murfreesboro was a minor irritation. Bate was recalled to Nashville, but Forrest remained near Murfreesboro and thus was absent from the battle of Nashville. In retrospect, Hood's decision to detach Forrest from his main command was a major blunder.

== Battle of Nashville (December 15–16) ==
The Battle of Nashville, December 15–16

Under the command of Thomas, who now had a combined force of approximately 55,000 men, the 7-mile-long semicircular Union defensive line surrounded Nashville from the west to the east; the remainder of the circle, to the north, was the Cumberland River, patrolled by U.S. Navy gunboats.

It took Thomas over two weeks to move, causing great anxiety in Washington, where it was anticipated that Hood was poised for an invasion of the North. General Grant pressured Thomas to move, despite a bitter ice storm that struck on December 8 and stopped much fortification on both sides. A few days later, Grant sent an aide to relieve Thomas of command, believing that Hood would slip through his fingers. On December 13, Maj. Gen. John A. Logan was directed to proceed to Nashville and assume command if, upon his arrival, Thomas had not yet initiated operations. He made it as far as Louisville by December 15, but on that day the Battle of Nashville had finally begun.

Thomas finally came out of his fortifications on December 15 to start a two-phase attack on the Confederates. The first, but secondary, attack was by Steedman on the Confederate right flank. The main attack would be on the enemy's left, by Smith, Wood, and Brig. Gen. Edward Hatch (commanding a dismounted cavalry brigade). Steedman's attack kept Cheatham on the Confederate right occupied for the rest of the day. The main attack wheeled left to a line parallel to the Hillsboro Pike. By noon, the main advance had reached the pike, and Wood prepared to assault the Confederate outposts on Montgomery Hill, near the center of the line. Hood became concerned about the threat on his left flank and ordered Lee to send reinforcements to Stewart. Wood's corps took Montgomery Hill in a charge by Brig. Gen. Samuel Beatty's division.

At about 1:00 p.m., there was a salient in Hood's line at Stewart's front. Thomas ordered Wood to attack the salient, supported by Schofield and Wilson. By 1:30 p.m., Stewart's position along the pike became untenable; the attacking force was overwhelming. Stewart's corps broke and began to retreat toward the Granny White Turnpike. However, Hood was able to regroup his men toward nightfall in preparation for the battle the next day. The Union cavalry under Wilson had been unable to put enough force on the turnpike to hamper the Confederate movement, since many of its troopers were participating as dismounted infantry in the assault. The exhausted Confederates dug in all night, awaiting the arrival of the Federals.

It took most of the morning on December 16 for the Federals to move into position against Hood's new line, which had been reduced to about 2 miles in length. Once again, Thomas planned a two-phase attack but concentrated on Hood's left. Schofield was to drive back Cheatham, and Wilson's cavalry was to swing to the rear to block the Franklin Pike, Hood's only remaining route of withdrawal. At noon, Wood and Steedman attacked Lee on Overton's Hill, but without success. On the left, Wilson's dismounted cavalry was exerting pressure on the line.

At 4:00 p.m., Cheatham, on Shy's Hill, was under assault from three sides, and his corps broke and fled to the rear. Wood took this opportunity to renew his attack on Lee on Overton's Hill, and this time the momentum was overwhelming. Darkness fell, and heavy rain began. Hood collected his forces and withdrew to the south toward Franklin.

Casualties from the two-day battle were 3,061 Union (387 killed, 2,558 wounded, and 112 missing or captured) and approximately 6,000 Confederate (1,500 killed or wounded, 4,500 missing or captured). The Battle of Nashville was one of the most stunning victories achieved by the Union Army in the war. The formidable Army of Tennessee, the second largest Confederate force, was effectively destroyed as a fighting force. Hood's army entered Tennessee with over 30,000 men but left with 15–20,000. (Note: the field returns for Hood's army on January 20, 1865, listed 20,700 effectives. Jacobson surmises that missing men from Franklin and Nashville gradually rejoined the army during and after its retreat.)

== Retreat and pursuit of Hood ==
The Union army set off in pursuit of Hood from Nashville. The rainy weather helped the Confederates by delaying the Union cavalry pursuit, and Forrest was able to rejoin Hood on December 18, screening the retreating force. The pursuit continued until the beaten and battered Army of Tennessee recrossed the Tennessee River on December 25. On Christmas Eve, Forrest turned back Wilson's pursuing cavalry at the Battle of Anthony's Hill.

== Aftermath ==
Although Hood blamed the entire debacle of his campaign on his subordinates and the soldiers themselves, his career was over. He retreated with his army to Tupelo, Mississippi, resigned his command on January 13, 1865, and was not given another field command. Forrest returned to Mississippi, but in 1865 he was driven into Alabama by James H. Wilson, and his command became dissipated and ineffective.

By the time of Hood's defeat in Nashville, Sherman's army had advanced to the outskirts of Savannah, which they captured just before Christmas. Five thousand men from the Army of Tennessee were later deployed under Joseph E. Johnston against Sherman in South Carolina during the Carolinas campaign, but to no avail.
