= William Hawley (general) =

Union Army colonel in the American Civil War

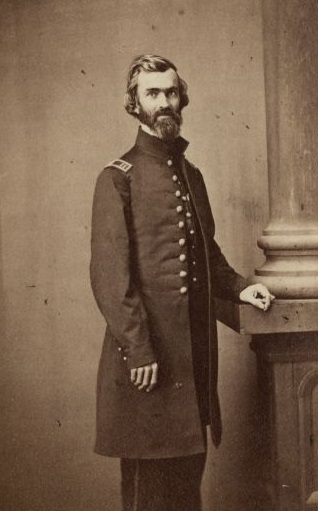
- Capt. William Hawley, circa 1861
- Born: August 19, 1824; Porter, New York, U.S.
- Died: January 15, 1873 (aged 48) Buffalo, New York, U.S.
- Buried: Glenwood Cemetery, Flint, Michigan
- Allegiance: United States
- Branch: United States Army; Union Army
- Service years: 1846–1848; 1861–1865
- Rank: Colonel, USV; Brevet Brig. General, USV; 1st Lieutenant, USA
- Commands: 3rd Reg. Wis. Vol. Infantry
- Conflicts: Mexican–American War; American Civil War
- Spouse: Caroline Hawley (died 1886)

William A. Hawley (August 19, 1824 – January 15, 1873) was a career United States Army officer, who served in the Mexican–American War and the American Civil War. During the Civil War, he commanded the 3rd Wisconsin Infantry Regiment and received an honorary brevet to the rank of brigadier general.

== Biography ==
Hawley was born on August 19, 1824, in Porter, New York. He lived in Lockport, New York, before moving to Madison, Wisconsin, in 1854.

== Career ==
Hawley originally served in the United States Army during the Mexican–American War, where he achieved the rank of sergeant. He was discharged after the end of the war. After the outbreak of the American Civil War, Hawley was commissioned an officer in the Union Army and helped to organized the 3rd Wisconsin Infantry Regiment. The following year, he was promoted to lieutenant colonel and colonel the year after that, at which time he took command of the regiment. Under Hawley's command, the regiment participated in the Battle of Chancellorsville, the Battle of Gettysburg, the Atlanta campaign, Sherman's March to the Sea, and the Carolinas campaign.

Hawley was mustered out of the volunteers on July 18, 1865. On January 13, 1866, President Andrew Johnson nominated Hawley for appointment to the grade of brevet brigadier general of volunteers to rank from March 16, 1865, for gallant services in the campaigns in Georgia and South Carolina, and the United States Senate confirmed the appointment on March 12, 1866.

Following the war and his discharge in July 1865, Hawley left the army for a time. In May 1866, he re-joined the U.S. Army as a second lieutenant in the 11th U.S. Infantry Regiment and was stationed in Virginia that year. On September 21, 1866, he was transferred to the 20th U.S. Infantry Regiment. Hawley was promoted to first lieutenant on December 6, 1866.

On January 15, 1873, Hawley died in Buffalo, New York, after falling ill during a blizzard. William Hawley was buried in Glenwood Cemetery, Flint, Michigan.

Military offices
Preceded by Thomas H. Ruger	Command of the 3rd Wisconsin Infantry Regiment; March 10, 1863 – July 18, 1865	Regiment disbanded
