= General Taylor (disambiguation) =

Zachary Taylor (1784–1850) was a general who later served as the 12th president of the United States from 1849 to 1850.

General Taylor may also refer to:

== US Army generals ==
- James Taylor Jr. (banker) (1769–1848)
- Joseph Pannell Taylor (1796–1864)
- George W. Taylor (general) (1808–1862)
- Nelson Taylor (1821–1894)
- Asher Clayton Taylor (1842–1922)
- Harry Taylor (engineer) (1862–1930)
- John Thomas Taylor (1886–1965)
- George A. Taylor (1899–1969)
- Maxwell D. Taylor (1901–1987)
- Telford Taylor (1908–1998)
- Richard R. Taylor (1922–1978)

== US Air Force generals ==
- Robert P. Taylor (1909–1997)
- Kenneth M. Taylor (1919–2006)
- Francis X. Taylor (born 1948)
- George P. Taylor (born 1953)

== Confederate generals ==
- M. D. K. Taylor (1818–1897)
- Thomas H. Taylor (1825–1901)
- Richard Taylor (Confederate general) (1826–1879)

== Ohio State Militia ==
- Jonathan Taylor (congressman) (1796–1848), brigadier general
- John L. Taylor (1805–1870), major general

== British generals ==
- Robert Taylor (British Army officer) (1760–1839)
- Herbert Taylor (British Army officer) (1775–1839)
- Thomas William Taylor (British Army officer) (1782–1854)
- Richard Taylor (British Army officer) (1819–1904)
- Maurice Taylor (British Army officer) (1881–1960)
- Allan Taylor (British Army officer) (1919–2004)
- Reynell Taylor (British Army officer) (1928–1996)

== Other uses ==
- USS General Taylor, an American warship
- General Orwell Taylor, a Marvel Comics character
- Brigadier General Taylor, a character in Good Morning, Vietnam
- "General Taylor", a sea shanty recorded by Steeleye Span on Ten Man Mop, or Mr. Reservoir Butler Rides Again, by Fairport Convention on The Bonny Bunch of Roses and by Great Big Sea on Play

== See also ==
- Attorney General Taylor (disambiguation)
