= 97th Ohio Infantry Regiment =

American Civil War infantry regiment

- Active: September 1, 1862, to June 10, 1865
- Country: United States
- Allegiance: Union
- Branch: Infantry
- Engagements: Defense of Cincinnati; Battle of Perryville; Battle of Stones River; Tullahoma Campaign; Siege of Chattanooga; Battle of Missionary Ridge; Atlanta campaign; Battle of Resaca; Battle of Kennesaw Mountain; Battle of Peachtree Creek; Siege of Atlanta; Battle of Jonesboro; Battle of Franklin; Battle of Nashville

The 97th Ohio Infantry Regiment, sometimes 97th Ohio Volunteer Infantry (or 97th OVI) was an infantry regiment in the Union Army during the American Civil War.

== Service ==
The 97th Ohio Infantry was organized at Zanesville, Ohio, and mustered in for three years service on September 1, 1862, under the command of Colonel John Quincy Lane.

The regiment was attached to 21st Brigade, 6th Division, Army of the Ohio, September 1862. 21st Brigade, 6th Division, II Corps, Army of the Ohio, to November 1862. 2nd Brigade, 1st Division, Left Wing, XIV Corps, Army of the Cumberland, to January 1863. 2nd Brigade, 1st Division, XXI Corps, Army of the Cumberland, to October 1863. 2nd Brigade, 2nd Division, IV Corps, Army of the Cumberland, to June 1865.

The 97th Ohio Infantry mustered out of service at Nashville, Tennessee, on June 10, 1865.

== Detailed service ==
Moved to Covington, Ky., September 7, thence to Louisville, Ky., September 20. Pursuit of Bragg into Kentucky October 1–15, 1862. Battle of Perryville, Ky., October 8 (reserve). March to Nashville, Tenn., October 16-November 21, and duty there until December 26. Action at Kimbrough's Mill, Mill Creek, December 6. Advance on Murfreesboro December 26–30. Battle of Stones River December 30–31, 1862 and January 1–3, 1863. Duty at Murfreesboro until June. Reconnaissance to Nolensville and Versailles January 13–15. Expedition to McMinnville April 20–30. Tullahoma Campaign June 23-July 7. Passage of the Cumberland Mountains and Tennessee River and Chickamauga Campaign August 16-September 22. Occupation of Chattanooga, September 9. First regiment to enter city and assigned to duty as its garrison. Siege of Chattanooga September 24-November 23. Chattanooga-Ringgold Campaign November 23–27. Orchard Knob November 23–24. Missionary Ridge November 25. Pursuit to Graysville November 26–27. March to relief of Knoxville, November 28-December 8. Operations in eastern Tennessee until April 1864. Atlanta Campaign May 1 to September 8. Demonstrations on Rocky Faced Ridge and Dalton, Ga., May 8–13. Buzzard's Roost Gap May 8–9. Battle of Resaca May 14–15. Adairsville May 17. Near Kingston May 18–19. Near Cassville May 19. Advance on Dallas May 22–25. Operations on line of Pumpkin Vine Creek and battles about Dallas, New Hope Church and Allatoona Hills May 25-June 5. Operations about Marietta and against Kennesaw Mountain June 10-July 2. Pine Hill June 11–14. Lost Mountain June 15–17. Ackworth June 18. Assault on Kennesaw June 27. Ruff's Station, Smyrna Camp Ground, July 4. Chattahoochie River July 5–17. Buckhead, Nancy's Creek, July 18. Peachtree Creek July 19–20. Siege of Atlanta July 22-August 25. Flank movement on Jonesboro August 25–30. Battle of Jonesboro August 31-September 1. Lovejoy's Station September 2–6. Operations against Hood in northern Georgia and northern Alabama September 29-November 3. Nashville Campaign November–December. Columbia, Duck River, November 24–27. Battle of Franklin November 30. Battle of Nashville December 15–16. Pursuit of Hood to the Tennessee River December 17–28. Moved to Huntsville, Ala., and duty there until March 1865. Operations in eastern Tennessee March 15-April 22. Moved to Nashville, Tenn., and duty there until June.

== Casualties ==
The regiment lost a total of 254 men during service; 1 officer and 92 enlisted men killed or mortally wounded, 1 officer and 160 enlisted men died of disease.

== Commanders ==
- Colonel John Q. Lane
- Lieutenant Colonel Milton Barnes - commanded at the battles of Chickamauga and Nashville
- Captain Clarkson C. Nichols - commanded at the battle of Nashville

== Notable members ==
- 1st Sergeant Alfred Ramsbottom, Company K - Medal of Honor recipient for action at the second battle of Franklin

== See also ==
- List of Ohio Civil War units
- Ohio in the Civil War
