= 20th Wisconsin Infantry Regiment =

Union Army infantry regiment

- Flag of Wisconsin
- Active: August 23, 1862 – July 14, 1865
- Country: United States
- Allegiance: Union
- Branch: Infantry
- Size: Regiment
- Engagements: Battle of Prairie Grove; Siege of Vicksburg; Battle of Brownsville; Battle of Mustang Island; Siege of Fort Morgan

Commanders
- Colonel: Bertine Pinckney
- Colonel: Henry Bertram
- Lt. Col.: Henry A. Starr

The 20th Wisconsin Infantry Regiment was a volunteer infantry regiment that served in the Union Army during the American Civil War.

== Service ==
The 20th Wisconsin was organized at Madison, Wisconsin, and mustered into Federal service August 23, 1862.

The regiment was mustered out on July 14, 1865, at Galveston, Texas.

== Casualties ==
The 20th Wisconsin suffered 5 officers and 100 enlisted men killed in action or who later died of their wounds, plus another 1 officer and 145 enlisted men who died of disease, for a total of 251 fatalities.

== Commanders ==
- Colonel Bertine Pinckney (June 1, 1862 – December 6, 1862) was assigned to brigade command shortly after arriving in theater, suffered a stroke and resigned in late 1862. Before becoming colonel of the 20th Wisconsin Infantry, he was major and lieutenant colonel in the 3rd Wisconsin Infantry Regiment. After the war he served in the Kansas House of Representatives.
- Colonel Henry Bertram (December 6, 1862 – March 13, 1865) was lieutenant colonel when the regiment was raised, was acting commander of the regiment when Colonel Pinckney served as brigade commander. Was promoted to colonel after Pinckney's resignation, remained the nominal commander of the regiment for the rest of the war, but also served as brigade commander for much of that time. Before joining the 20th Wisconsin Infantry, he was a 1st lieutenant and captain of Co. A, 3rd Wisconsin Infantry. After the war, he received an honorary brevet to brigadier general. He served in the Wisconsin State Assembly, was sheriff of Dodge County, Wisconsin, and was mayor of Watertown, Wisconsin, for three terms.
- Lt. Colonel Henry A. Starr (March 13, 1865 – July 14, 1865) served as acting commander of the regiment when Colonel Bertram was in command of the brigade.

== Notable people ==
- Thomas Bintliff, brother of James Bintliff, was first lieutenant in Co. I and was killed at Prairie Grove, Arkansas.
- Phineas Clawson was second lieutenant and later first lieutenant of Co. A, serving to the end of the war. After the war he became a Wisconsin state senator.
- Rufus M. Day was a private in Co. I, serving through the entire war. After the war he became a Wisconsin state legislator.
- William J. Hoynes was a private in Co. A, was wounded at Prairie Grove, Arkansas, and discharged in November 1863 due to his wounds. After the war he became dean of the law department at the University of Notre Dame.
- Frederick Kusel was captain of Co. E and was wounded at Prairie Grove, Arkansas. He resigned in October 1863. After the war he became a Wisconsin state senator.
- August F. Kusel, brother of Frederick Kusel, was first sergeant in Co. E and was discharged due to disability after Prairie Grove.
- Reuben Norton, son of Reuben M. Norton, was a private in Co. C and was mortally wounded at Prairie Grove, Arkansas.
- William O'Neil was a corporal in Co. H and was discharged due to disability after Prairie Grove. After the war he became a Wisconsin state senator.
- Augustus Herman Pettibone was captain of Co. A and later major, serving until the end of the war. He earlier served briefly as an enlisted man in Co. B of the 19th Wisconsin Infantry Regiment. After the war he became a U.S. congressman from Tennessee.

== See also ==
- List of Wisconsin Civil War units
- Wisconsin in the American Civil War
