= 3rd Wisconsin Infantry Regiment =

Union Army infantry regiment

- Flag of Wisconsin
- Active: June 19, 1861 – July 18, 1865
- Country: United States
- Allegiance: Union
- Branch: Infantry
- Size: Regiment
- Engagements: American Civil War: Battle of Front Royal; Battle of Cedar Mountain; Battle of Antietam; Battle of Chancellorsville; Battle of Gettysburg; Battle of Kennesaw Mountain; Battle of Bentonville

Commanders
- Colonel: Charles Smith Hamilton
- Colonel: Thomas H. Ruger
- Colonel: William Hawley

The 3rd Wisconsin Infantry Regiment was a volunteer infantry regiment that served in the Union Army during the American Civil War. They participated in many significant battles in the eastern theater of the war, including Antietam and Gettysburg, but were then detached as part of the detail sent to New York to put down the New York City draft riots. They were then transferred to the western theater of the war with XII Corps and served in the Atlanta and Carolinas campaigns.

== Service ==
The 3rd Wisconsin assembled at Camp Hamilton, in Fond du Lac, Wisconsin, and mustered into Federal service on June 19, 1861. Its first commander was Col. Charles Smith Hamilton.

The 3rd Wisconsin Infantry was a part of Gen. Nathaniel Banks' army during Jackson's Shenandoah Valley campaign of 1862. Later in the year, the 3rd Wisconsin took part in the fighting around the Cornfield during the Battle of Antietam. In 1863, after the Battle of Gettysburg, the 3rd was sent to New York, to help control the New York City draft riots.

The regiment participated in the Grand Review of the Armies on May 24, 1865, and then mustered out at Louisville, Kentucky, on July 18, 1865.

== Commanders ==
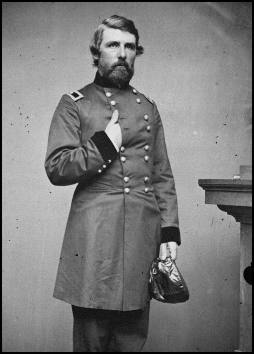
Charles S. Hamilton, ca. 1861

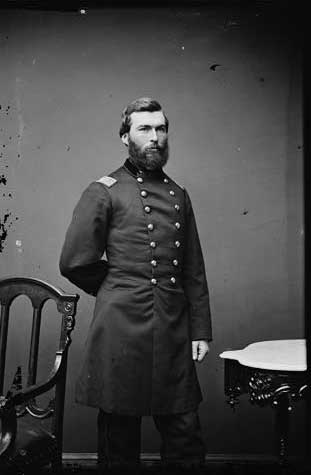
Thomas H. Ruger

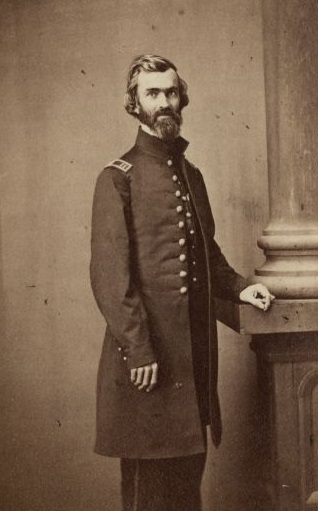
William Hawley, ca. 1861

- Colonel Charles Smith Hamilton (May 11, 1861 – August 10, 1861) was promoted to brigadier general. He was later promoted to major general. After the war, he served as a U.S. marshal.
- Colonel Thomas H. Ruger (August 10, 1861 – November 29, 1862) began the war as engineer-in-chief to Governor Alexander Randall, and mustered into federal service with the 3rd Wisconsin Infantry as lieutenant colonel. He left the regiment when promoted to brigadier general. After the war he was military governor of Georgia during Reconstruction and remained in the military until 1897, retiring with the rank of major general.
- Colonel William Hawley (March 10, 1863 – July 18, 1865) mustered into federal service with the 3rd Wisconsin Infantry as captain of Co. K. He mustered out with the regiment and received an honorary brevet to brigadier general.

== Total enlistments and casualties ==
The 3rd Wisconsin Infantry initially mustered 979 men and later recruited an additional 940 men, for a total of 1919 men. The regiment lost 9 officers and 158 enlisted men killed in action or who later died of their wounds, plus another 2 officers and 113 enlisted men who died of disease, for a total of 282 fatalities.

3rd Wisconsin Infantry, Company Organization
| Company | Original Moniker | Primary Place of Recruitment | Captain(s) |
|---|---|---|---|
| A | Watertown Rifles | Cities of Watertown and Shullsburg, Fond du Lac, Good Hope, Shields, Hustisford, Stockbridge, Prairie du Chien and Winneconne | Darius S. Gibbs (resigned); Henry Bertram (transferred); Ralph Van Brunt (mustered out) |
| B | Scott's Volunteers | City of Oshkosh and Winnebago County | John Walter Scott (promoted); George W. Stevenson (promoted); William M. Snow (wounded–resigned); Wilson S. Buck (wounded–discharged); John E. Kleven (mustered out) |
| C | Green County Volunteers | Green County | Martin Flood (promoted); Silas E. Gardner (resigned); Abner Hubbell (acting–mustered out) |
| D | Waupun Light Guard | City of Waupun and Fond du Lac County | Andrew Clark (discharged); Lyman B. Balcom (wounded–resigned); Charles R. Barager (mustered out) |
| E | Williamstown Union Rifles | City of Williamstown and Dodge County | Gustavus A. Hammer (discharged); Julian W. Hinkley (mustered out) |
| F | Grant County Union Guards | Grant County | George W. Limbocker (resigned); Emanuel J. Bentley (resigned); James W. Hunter (DOW); Charles R. Barager (transferred); Jasper Woodford (mustered out) |
| G | Neenah Guards | City of Neenah and Winnebago County | Edwin Lathrop Hubbard (promoted); Ephraim Giddings (mustered out) |
| H | Lafayette Rifles | Lafayette County | George J. Whitman (wounded–discharged); Thomas Slagg (resigned); John M. Schweers (mustered out) |
| I | Shullsburg Light Guard | City of Shullsburg and Lafayette County | Howard Vandegrift (resigned); Moses O'Brien (DOW); Nahun Daniels (detailed; mustered out); William Freeborn (acting; discharged) |
| K | Dane County Guards | City of Madison and Dane County | William Hawley (promoted); Warham Parks (promoted); Thomas E. Orton (KIA); Alexander D. Haskins (mustered out) |

== Notable people ==
- Oscar Bartlett, chief surgeon, was a Wisconsin state legislator before the war.
- Henry Bertram, 1st lieutenant in Co. A, later became colonel of the 20th Wisconsin Infantry Regiment and received an honorary brevet to brigadier general. After the war he became a Wisconsin state legislator and sheriff.
- Edwin E. Bryant, sergeant major, was commissioned and appointed adjutant to Colonel Ruger in 1862. In 1864, he returned to Wisconsin as a draft commissioner, and was later commissioned lieutenant colonel of the 50th Wisconsin Infantry Regiment. After the war, he served as private secretary to Governor Lucius Fairchild and became a Wisconsin state legislator.
- Horace O. Crane, assistant surgeon, was appointed surgeon-in-charge for the field hospital at St. John's College, Annapolis. In 1863 he returned to Wisconsin as an examining surgeon for the Union Army enrollment board.
- Charles L. Dering, 1st lieutenant in Co. B, later served in the Wisconsin State Senate.
- John A. Haggerty, private in Co. A, later became a Wisconsin state legislator.
- Byron H. Kilbourn, son of Milwaukee co-founder Byron Kilbourn, was 2nd lieutenant in Co. D.
- Bertine Pinckney, major, later became colonel of the 20th Wisconsin Infantry Regiment, but suffered a stroke in 1862. Before the war, he had served in the Wisconsin State Senate. After leaving the Army, he was elected mayor of Ripon, Wisconsin, and served in the Kansas House of Representatives.
- Asher Clayton Taylor, corporal in Co. D, later became the regiment's sergeant major and served as Colonel Hawley's adjutant at the close of the war. He remained in the U.S. Army and served in the 15th U.S. Infantry Regiment in the Indian Wars. He was a colonel during the Spanish–American War and retired with the rank of brigadier general.

== See also ==
- List of Wisconsin Civil War units
- Wisconsin in the American Civil War
- 3rd Wisconsin Infantry Regiment (1898)
