= Crow War =

Part of the American Indian Wars

- Part of the American Indian Wars
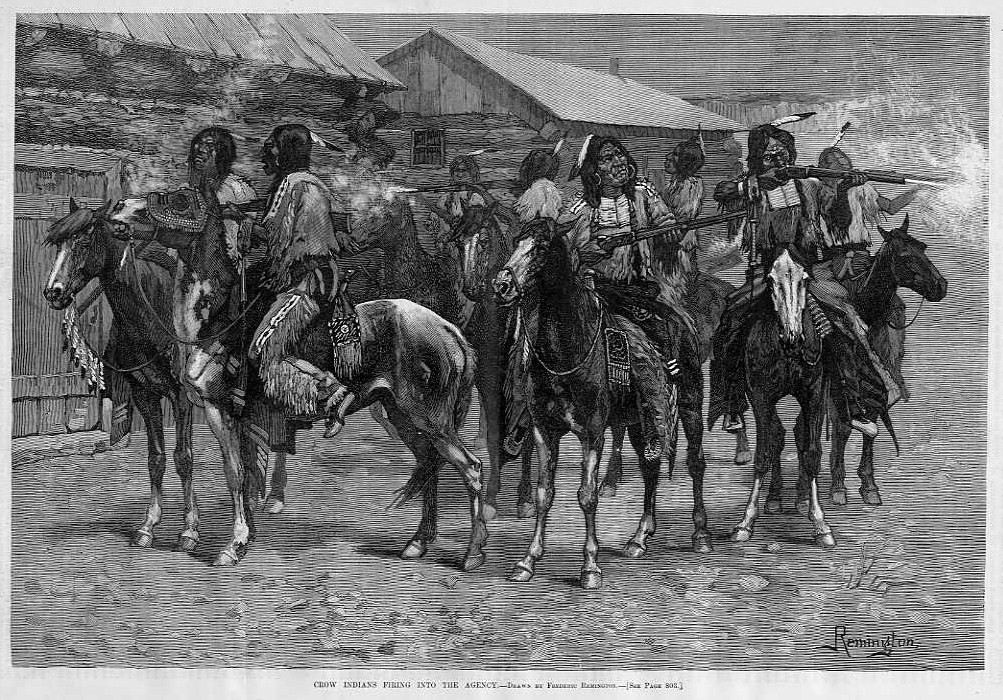
- "Crow Indians Firing Into The Agency" by Frederic Remington.
Date	30 September 1887 - 5 November 1887
Location	Crow Indian Reservation, Big Horn County, Montana Territory, United States
Result	United States victory

Belligerents
United States	Crow

Commanders and leaders
(United States) Thomas H. Ruger	Sword Bearer †

Casualties and losses
1 killed 2 wounded	7 killed 9 wounded 9 captured

The Crow War, also known as the Crow Rebellion, or the Crow Uprising, was the only armed conflict between the United States and the Crow tribe of Montana, and the last Indian War fought in the state. In September 1887, the young medicine man Wraps-Up-His-Tail, or Sword Bearer, led a small group of warriors in a raid against a group of Blackfoot which had taken horses from the Crow reservation. Following the raid, Sword Bearer led his group back to the Crow Agency to inform the Indian agent of his victory, but an incident occurred which ended with the young leader taking his followers into the mountains. In response, the United States Army launched a successful campaign to bring the Crow back to the reservation.

== War ==
=== Crow Incident ===
In 1887, the Blackfoot and the Crow were in the middle of a minor conflict in which both sides raided for each other's horses. In late spring, a war party of Blackfoot raided the Crow reservation and made off with several horses. Against the chiefs' decision, Sword Bearer decided to lead a counter raid in September. His group consisted mainly of teenagers who were eager to prove themselves to their elders. According to legend, Sword Bearer received his name after having a vision at a Cheyenne reservation though other sources say that his vision occurred after the army was already hunting him. The vision told Sword Bearer that if he carried a sword in battle, he would be protected from harm. During the raid, a number of Blackfoot braves were killed and the Crow recovered their horses without loss, but when they returned to the reservation, on September 30, Sword Bearer made the mistake of showing off his victory to the Indian agent, Henry E. Williamson, who was known for being disliked by the native population. In what was called the Crow Incident, Sword Bearer and his men circled around Williamson's home and fired into the air to celebrate but this only upset the agent who came outside to make arrests. Sword Bearer then fired a few rounds into the ground next to the agent so he ran back inside to wire the army at Fort Custer and tell them his house was under attack. At the time, local newspapers said Williamson's house was also fired into though it remains uncertain if this was true or not, the "Billings Gazette," dated October 3, said that the "houses and office of the agent were riddled by bullets" but nobody was hurt. A few days later, when Sword Bearer learned that the United States Army was looking for him, he and about twenty men left the reservation to go to Fort Custer, thirteen miles away, in order to show the soldiers the magical sword.

When the soldiers noticed the approaching warriors, about 150 yards away, they assumed they were under attack and loaded a battery of cannon. However, it had been raining previously so when the soldiers tried to open fire, the cannon wouldn't work, proving to Sword Bearer and his men that his miraculous saber really did provide protection. The Crow then fled toward the Little Bighorn River, where it was believed that Sword Bearer was to recruit more men, particularly from the nearby Cheyenne reservation. By this time the lower Crow chiefs had become quite concerned with the situation so they informed the high chief, Plenty Coups, who ordered the Crow police to begin searching for Sword Bearer and his followers so that the American settlers wouldn't panic. It was too late though as hundreds of settlers had already begun to flee by train from the areas around the Crow reservation.

=== Battle of Crow Agency ===
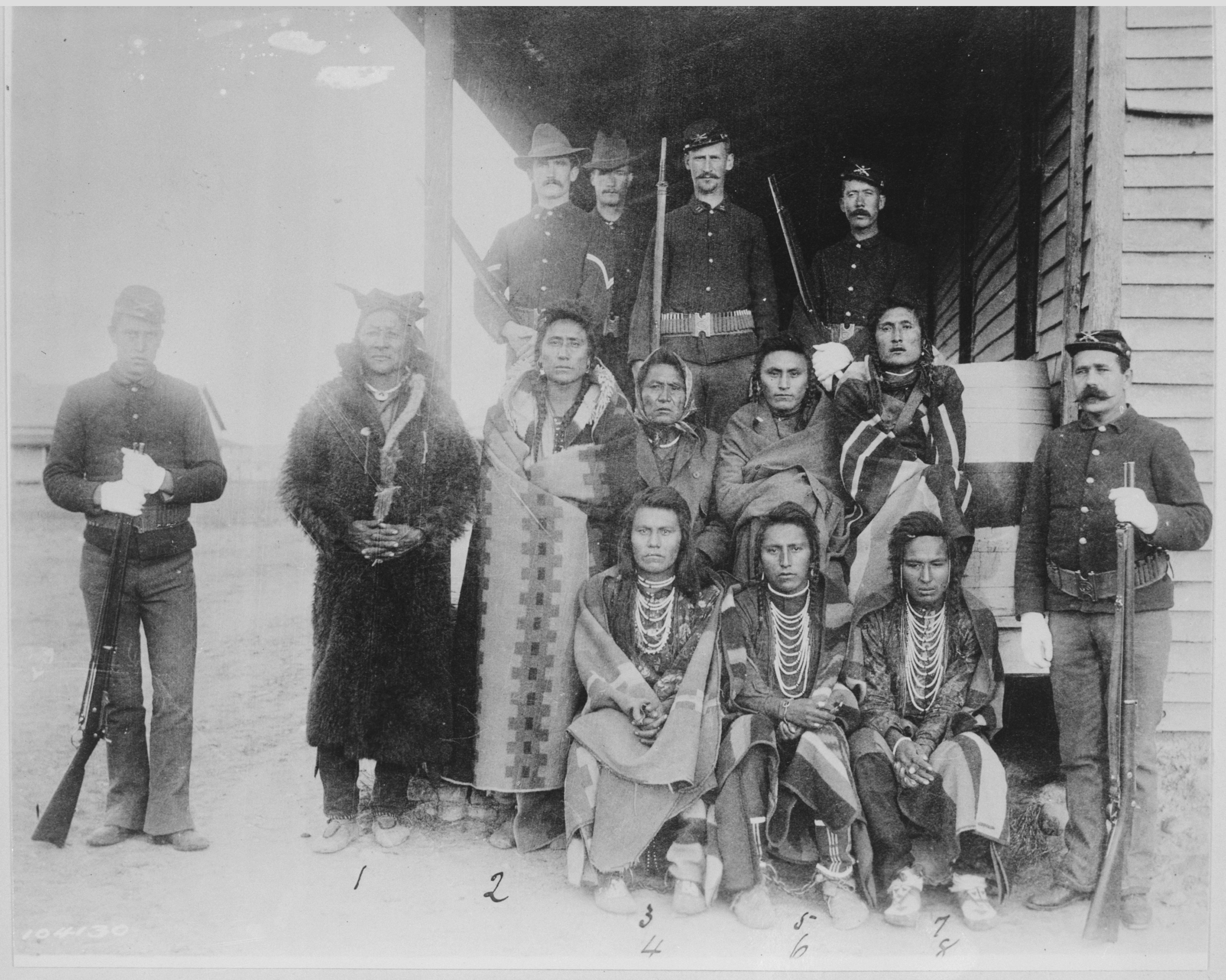
"Chief Plenty Coups and seven Crow prisoners under guard at Crow agency. Montana, 1887"

Meanwhile, the United States Army was also taking action, Brigadier General Thomas H. Ruger was placed in command of the soldiers at Fort Custer and Fort McKinney, Wyoming and instructed to launch an expedition into the Big Horn and occupy the Cheyenne reservation, in order to prevent any of the natives there from joining the hostile Crow. The expedition from Fort Custer was under the command of General Ruger and Colonel Nathan Dudley, it included five troops of the 1st Cavalry and one company from the 3rd Infantry. There was also one troop from the 7th Cavalry. The expedition headed for the mountains on November 4, taking two Hotchkiss guns with them. On the following day they encountered Sword Bearer and his followers, encamped near the river approximately three miles north of where George A. Custer's troops had been defeated in the famous Battle of Little Bighorn in 1876. Some of Sword Bearer's followers were veterans of Custer's battle, as well as some of the Crow police. According to one American veteran, Private George Morris of Derby, England, there were about 3,000 natives at the camp up against only a few hundred soldiers. At 10:30 am, General Ruger gave the Crow an hour and a half to surrender, which they could do by making their way to a designated area to be disarmed. Morris said the following; "Indians who wanted to be our friends were to move their camp to the neighborhood of a certain tall birch. The rest would be considered hostile, and destroyed. ... It was a tense morning as we watched the slow drift of the Indians toward that birch tree. Those who went there were disarmed, and a guard posted." When the time limit expired, there was still 600 natives in the camp. General Ruger gave the order for his men to form up, the battalion of 1st Cavalry was positioned with Colonel Dudley on the left flank of the camp while the troop of 7th Cavalry was positioned on the right.

At the same time Sword Bearer appeared, leading 120 to 150 warriors in a mounted charge against the soldiers. The attack was repulsed and the Crow retreated to the wooded area along the river where they had beforehand established a series of rifle pits. The American cavalry then counterattacked, Morris said; "The cavalry charged and took a volley from the Indian camp. At 200 yards we leaped from our horses and flattened out behind clumps of sagebrush. We traded shots for a while, until two Hotchkiss field guns on the hill began dumping two-inch into the Indian camp. That broke them." During the fighting, Sword Bearer attempted to encourage his men by riding out in front of the soldiers but he was struck by rifle fire and fell to the ground wounded. Eventually some of the Crow began to surrender but Sword Bearer and the others remained in the mountains, only to surrender later on to the Crow police. It was during the march out of the Big Horn that one of the policemen shot Sword Bearer in the head, killing him instantly and ending the war. One soldier was killed and two others were wounded during what is now called the Battle of Crow Agency. Seven Crow warriors were killed and nine were wounded. An additional nine men were also taken prisoner and all of those who hadn't taken part in the battle were taken to Fort Snelling, Minnesota. The expedition returned to Fort Custer on November 13.

== Order of battle ==
Native Americans, Chief's Old Bear, Two Moon, and Little Coyote (Little Wolf). About 60 to 250 warriors.

Tribe	Leader	Size
Crow	Sword Bearer	120 –150 warriors

United States Army

November 5, 1887, Brigadier General Thomas H. Ruger, commanding.

Expedition	Regiment	Companies and others
Command; Brig. Gen. Thomas H. Ruger	1st Cavalry	Company A, 1st United States Cavalry Regiment: Company B, 1st United States Cavalry Regiment: Company D, 1st United States Cavalry Regiment: Company E, 1st United States Cavalry Regiment: Company G, 1st United States Cavalry Regiment: Company K, 1st United States Cavalry Regiment:
Command; Brig. Gen. Thomas H. Ruger	7th Cavalry Captain Myles Moylan	Company A, 7th United States Cavalry Regiment
Command; Brig. Gen. Thomas H. Ruger	9th Cavalry	Company H, 9th United States Cavalry Regiment
Command; Brig. Gen. Thomas H. Ruger	3rd Infantry	Company B, 3rd United States Infantry Regiment: Company E, 3rd United States Infantry Regiment:
Command; Brig. Gen. Thomas H. Ruger	7th Infantry	Company C, 7th United States Infantry Regiment: Company D, 7th United States Infantry Regiment: Company G, 7th United States Infantry Regiment: Company I, 7th United States Infantry Regiment:

== Bibliography ==
- Michno, F. Gregory (2009). Encyclopedia of Indian wars: Western battles and skirmishes 1850–1890. Missoula, Montana: Mountain Press Publishing Company. ISBN 978-0-87842-468-9.
- Greene, Jerome A. (2007). Indian War veterans: memories of army life and campaigns in the West, 1864–1898. Casemate Publishers. ISBN 978-1-932714-26-5.
- "The First Regiment of Cavalry, United States Army (part 2)" (PDF). The Cavalry Journal. 31. United States Cavalry Association, Harvard University: 10–29. January 1922. Archived from the original (PDF) on 2022-01-21.
