= Phineas Clawson =

American politician

Phineas Clawson (October 27, 1839 – August 10, 1910) was a member of the Wisconsin State Senate.

== Biography ==
Clawson was born on October 27, 1839, in Greene County, Pennsylvania. He moved to Waukesha, Wisconsin, in 1851 and to Green County, Wisconsin, in 1868. In 1863, he graduated from what is now the University of Wisconsin-Madison.

During the American Civil War, Clawson served as a first lieutenant with the 20th Wisconsin Volunteer Infantry Regiment of the Union Army. He was wounded at the Battle of Prairie Grove. Other conflicts he took part in include the siege of Vicksburg, during which time he was involved in the Yazoo City Expedition, and the Battle of Spanish Fort.

Clawson died of throat cancer on August 10, 1910, in Monroe, Wisconsin.

== Political career ==
Clawson was a member of the Senate representing the 12th district. Additionally, he was District Attorney of Green County. He was a Republican.
