= Attorney General Taylor =

Attorney General Taylor may refer to:

- James Craig Taylor (1826–1887), Attorney General of Virginia
- William S. Taylor (Kentucky politician) (1853–1928), Attorney General of Kentucky

== See also ==
- General Taylor (disambiguation)
