= Henry Bertram =

Union Army officer in the American Civil War

Sheriff of Dodge County, Wisconsin
- In office January 2, 1871 – January 6, 1873
- Preceded by: Charles E. Goodwin
- Succeeded by: John Leslie

4th & 14th Mayor of Watertown, Wisconsin
- In office April 1870 – April 1871
- Preceded by: John Richards
- Succeeded by: Theodore Prentiss
- In office April 1857 – April 1859
- Preceded by: William Chappell
- Succeeded by: Calvin B. Skinner

Member of the Wisconsin State Assembly from the Dodge 4th district
- In office January 3, 1870 – January 2, 1871
- Preceded by: Eugene O'Connor
- Succeeded by: Marcus Tramer

Personal details
- Born: Emil Gustave Victor Beeger; October 5, 1825 Ueckermünde, Pomerania, Prussia
- Died: September 25, 1878 (aged 52) Juneau, Wisconsin, U.S.
- Resting place: Juneau Cemetery, Juneau, Wisconsin
- Party: Independent
- Occupation: hotel proprietor, sheriff

Military service
- Allegiance: United States
- Branch/service: United States Army; Union Army
- Years of service: 1846–1851; 1861–1865
- Rank: Colonel, USV; Brevet Brig. General, USV
- Commands: 20th Reg. Wis. Vol. Infantry; 1st Bde, 1st Div, Army of the Frontier; "Bertram's Brigade"
- Battles/wars: Mexican–American War; American Civil War; Battle of Prairie Grove; Siege of Vicksburg; Siege of Fort Morgan; Battle of Spanish Fort

Henry (Heinrich) Bertram (born Emil Gustave Victor Beeger; October 5, 1825 – September 25, 1878) was a German American immigrant and Union Army officer during the American Civil War. He rose to command a brigade in the trans-Mississippi and western theaters of the war, and received an honorary brevet to the rank of brigadier general. After the war, he served one term in the Wisconsin State Assembly, representing southern Dodge County, and was sheriff of Dodge County for two years.

== Biography ==
Bertram was born Emil Gustav Victor Beeger in the Province of Pomerania in the Kingdom of Prussia. Sometime before 1846 he emigrated to the United States.

He joined the United States Army under the Americanized named "Henry Beeger" in 1846 and served in the Mexican–American War. In the 2nd U.S. Artillery he rose to the rank of sergeant on August 21, 1846, but deserted the army four and a half years later on January 20, 1851.

Sometime before 1861 he changed his name to Henry Bertram, presumably to escape any connections to his earlier army desertion. He moved to the state of Wisconsin in 1858 and settled at Watertown, in Dodge County. On June 29, 1861, Bertram enlisted in the 3rd Wisconsin Infantry Regiment as a first lieutenant. By July 31, 1861, he had risen to lieutenant colonel of the 20th Wisconsin Infantry Regiment. Bertram and the 20th Wisconsin first saw action at the First Battle of Newtonia.

In early December 1862, Bertram found himself as the senior ranking officer in his brigade, though only a lieutenant colonel. He assumed command of the 1st Brigade in Francis Herron's 3rd Division of the Army of the Frontier. and was in command of the brigade at the battle of Prairie Grove. Though Bertram clung to the title of brigade commander during the battle, he realistically commanded no more than the 430 men of his own 20th Wisconsin regiment as the other regiments in his command were detached for temporary assignment elsewhere.

On December 10, 1862, Bertram was promoted to colonel. Despite his promotion he returned to regimental command during the Siege of Vicksburg. He commanded brigades in the Department of the Gulf after the fall of Vicksburg. In August 1864 his brigade was transferred to the Mobile Bay Land Forces under the command of Gordon Granger. There Bertram participated in the land operations during the Battle of Mobile Bay and the Siege of Fort Morgan.

He briefly commanded the District of Southern Alabama before returning to brigade command. His brigade, now part of the XIII Corps, fought in the Battle of Spanish Fort. After the war, he received a brevet to Brigadier General of U.S. Volunteers, backdated to March 13, 1865. He was mustered out of the volunteer service on July 14, 1865.

After the war he returned to Watertown, Wisconsin, and worked as a hotel proprietor. In the 1869, he was elected to the Wisconsin State Assembly from Dodge County's 4th Assembly district, running as an Independent.

Rather than running for re-election to the Assembly in 1870, Bertram was elected Sheriff of Dodge County, and relocated to Juneau, Wisconsin, for that duty. He died suddenly at Juneau in 1878.

Military offices
Preceded by Col. Bertine Pinckney	Command of the 20th Wisconsin Infantry Regiment; December 1862 – July 14, 1865	Regiment disbanded
Wisconsin State Assembly
Preceded by Eugene O'Connor	Member of the Wisconsin State Assembly from the Dodge 4th district January 3, 1870 – January 2, 1871	Succeeded by Marcus Tramer
Political offices
Preceded by William Chappell	Mayor of Watertown, Wisconsin; April 1857 – April 1859	Succeeded by Calvin B. Skinner
Preceded by John Richards	Mayor of Watertown, Wisconsin; April 1870 – April 1871	Succeeded by Theodore Prentiss
Legal offices
Preceded by Charles E. Goodwin	Sheriff of Dodge County, Wisconsin; January 2, 1871 – January 6, 1873	Succeeded by John Leslie
