= Thomas H. Ruger =

American general and politician

Thomas Howard Ruger
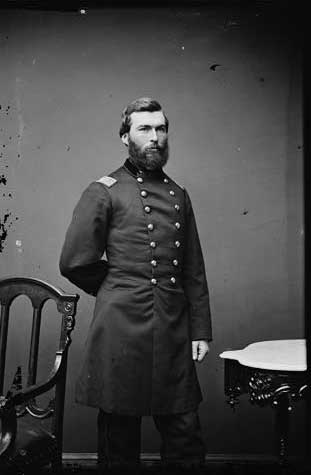
- Born: April 2, 1833; Lima, New York, U.S.
- Died: June 3, 1907 (aged 74); Stamford, Connecticut, U.S.
- Burial place: West Point Cemetery
- Military career
- Allegiance: United States of America; Union
- Branch: United States Army; Union Army
- Service years: 1854–1855, 1861–1897
- Rank: Major General
- Commands: Department of the Missouri; Department of Dakota; Department of California; Department of the East
- Conflicts: American Civil War: Shenandoah Campaign; Battle of Antietam; Battle of Chancellorsville; Gettysburg campaign; Battle of Gettysburg; New York Draft Riots; Battle of Franklin; Crow War: Battle of Crow Agency

Thomas Howard Ruger (April 2, 1833 – June 3, 1907) was an American soldier and lawyer who served as a Union general in the American Civil War. After the war, he was a superintendent of the United States Military Academy at West Point, New York.

== Early life ==
Ruger was born in Lima, New York, and moved to Janesville, Wisconsin in 1846. He graduated from the U.S. Military Academy in 1854, third in his class of 46, and was commissioned a second lieutenant in the U.S. Army Corps of Engineers. He resigned in 1855 to become a lawyer in Wisconsin.

== Civil War ==
Ruger was appointed lieutenant colonel of the 3rd Wisconsin Volunteer Infantry Regiment in June 1861, and promoted to colonel on August 20. Ruger commanded his regiment in Maryland and the Shenandoah Valley campaigns. He participated in the Battle of Antietam, in which he was wounded while acting commander of a brigade in the 1st Division, XII Corps. Commissioned brigadier general of volunteers in November 1862, Ruger led his brigade of the XII Corps, Army of the Potomac, in the Battle of Chancellorsville, and commanded the division of Brig. Gen. Alpheus Williams temporarily at Gettysburg. (Col. Silas Colgrove led the brigade in that battle, participating in the defense of Culp's Hill.) In the summer of 1863, Ruger was in New York City, where he aided in suppressing draft riots.

Ruger led a brigade of XX Corps in Maj. Gen. William T. Sherman's Atlanta campaign until November 1864, and with a division of XXIII Corps took part in the campaign against General John B. Hood's army in Tennessee. He was appointed a brevet major general of volunteers, November 30, 1864, for services at the Battle of Franklin. Ruger organized a division at Nashville and led his command to North Carolina in June 1865, and then had charge of the department of that state until June 1866. He was mustered out of his volunteer commission, accepting a regular army commission as colonel, July 28, 1866, and on March 2, 1867, was brevetted brigadier general, regular army, for his services at Gettysburg.

== Later years ==
Ruger participated in Reconstruction as the military governor of Georgia and in the Freedmen's Bureau in Alabama in 1868. He was the superintendent of the United States Military Academy from 1871 to 1876. Other commands he held were the Department of the South (1876–78), the Infantry and Cavalry School of Application (1885-86), the Department of Dakota (1886–91), the Military Division of the Pacific (1891), the Department of California (1891–94), the Military Division of the Missouri (1894-95) and the Department of the East (1895–97). In 1887 Ruger led the army's expedition into the Big Horn Mountains during the Crow War. From 1895 to 1897, he worked with Charles Badger Hall on a re-write of the to re-write the army's Infantry Drill Regulations, the service's main manual of arms. He retired, in 1897, with the rank of major general in the Regular Army.

He was a Veteran Companion of the Military Order of the Loyal Legion of the United States and an Honorary Companion of the Military Order of Foreign Wars.

He died in Stamford, Connecticut, and is buried in West Point National Cemetery.

Fort Ruger at Diamond Head on Oahu is named in his honor.

== See also ==
- List of American Civil War generals (Union)

== Notes ==
Military offices
Preceded by Thomas Gamble Pitcher	Superintendents of the United States Military Academy; 1871–1876	Succeeded by John McAllister Schofield
Preceded by Elwell Otis	Commandant of the Command and General Staff College; June 1885 – May 1886	Succeeded by Alexander McDowell McCook
Political offices
Preceded by Charles J. Jenkins	Governor of Georgia; 1868	Succeeded by Rufus Bullock
