= Bertine Pinckney =

American politician (1824–1909)

Member of the Kansas House of Representatives from the 77th district
- In office January 5, 1874 – January 4, 1875
- Preceded by: J. K. McLean
- Succeeded by: R. C. Bates

7th Mayor of Ripon, Wisconsin
- In office April 1864 – April 1865
- Preceded by: Charles F. Hammond
- Succeeded by: Henry T. Hinton

Member of the Wisconsin Senate
- In office January 3, 1853 – January 2, 1854
- Preceded by: Position established
- Succeeded by: Charles A. Eldredge
- Constituency: 20th Senate district
- In office January 5, 1852 – January 3, 1853
- Preceded by: John A. Eastman
- Succeeded by: Baruch S. Weil
- Constituency: 4th Senate district

Member of the Wisconsin State Assembly from the Fond du Lac 2nd district
- In office January 7, 1850 – January 6, 1851
- Preceded by: Jonathan Daugherty
- Succeeded by: Morris S. Barnett

Personal details
- Born: April 26, 1824 New York City, New York, U.S.
- Died: December 26, 1909 (aged 85) Peabody, Kansas, U.S.
- Resting place: Prairie Lawn Cemetery, Peabody, Kansas
- Party: Republican; Democratic (1853–1854); Whig (before 1853)
- Spouse: Louise P. Pinkney (died 1914)
- Children: Bertine Pinckney; Charles C. Pinckney
- Parents: William Pinkney (father); Hannah Bertine (mother)

Military service
- Allegiance: United States
- Branch/service: United States Army; Union Army
- Years of service: 1861–1862
- Rank: Colonel, USV
- Commands: 20th Reg. Wis. Vol. Infantry
- Battles/wars: American Civil War

Bertine B. Pinckney (April 26, 1824 – December 26, 1909) was an American farmer, surveyor, and politician. He served in the Wisconsin State Senate and Assembly, representing Fond du Lac County, and later served in the Kansas House of Representatives. During the American Civil War, he served as a Union Army officer and was colonel of the 20th Wisconsin Infantry Regiment until suffering a stroke in December 1862. His last name is often spelled Pinkney.

== Biography ==
Born in New York City, he moved to Rosendale, Wisconsin Territory, in 1847. He was a member of the Wisconsin State Assembly in 1850, representing Fond du Lac County's western Assembly district. In 1851, he was elected to represent the 4th State Senate district in 1852, and was redistricted that year to the 20th Senate district, where he served for 1853. He was originally a member of the Whig Party, but joined the Democratic Party after the 1852 election, and joined the Republican Party when it was organized in 1854.

During the American Civil War, Pinckney enlisted in the 3rd Wisconsin Volunteer Infantry Regiment was appointed major. Then in 1862, he was commissioned colonel in the 20th Wisconsin Volunteer Infantry Regiment. Pinckney suffered a stroke and had to resign his commission. In 1864, he served as mayor of Ripon, Wisconsin.

Pinckney moved to Peabody, Kansas, in 1871. In 1875, Pinckley served as a Republican in the Kansas House of Representatives as a representative of Marion County, and starting in 1877 was the postmaster of Peabody, Kansas. He died in Peabody and is buried at Prairie Lawn Cemetery there.

Military offices
Regiment established	Command of the 20th Wisconsin Infantry Regiment; August 23, 1862 – December 1862	Succeeded by Col. Henry Bertram
Wisconsin State Assembly
Preceded by Jonathan Daugherty	Member of the Wisconsin State Assembly from the Fond du Lac 2nd district January 7, 1850 – January 6, 1851	Succeeded by Morris S. Barnett
Wisconsin Senate
Preceded by John A. Eastman	Member of the Wisconsin Senate from the 4th district January 5, 1852 – January 3, 1853	Succeeded by Baruch S. Weil
District created	Member of the Wisconsin Senate from the 20th district January 3, 1853 – January 2, 1854	Succeeded by Charles A. Eldredge
Kansas House of Representatives
Preceded by J. K. McLean	Member of the Kansas House of Representatives from the 77th district January 5, 1874 – January 4, 1875	Succeeded by R. C. Bates
Political offices
Preceded by Charles F. Hammond	Mayor of Ripon, Wisconsin; April 1864 – April 1865	Succeeded by Henry T. Hinton
