= Jonathan Daugherty =

American politician (??–1856)

Jonathan Daugherty (? – March 3, 1856) was an American storekeeper from Rosendale, Wisconsin who spent two one-year terms representing Fond du Lac County as a member of the first two Wisconsin State Assemblies, the first as a Whig, the second as a member of the newly organized Free Soil Party.

== Background ==
Daugherty married Abigail (Abby) D. Goodell (1825–1890) in 1844. In 1846, Daugherty opened a store in Rosendale for "Fay & Collins", the first retail business in the two-year-old settlement. In 1847, "Daugherty & Woodruff" opened the first hotel in Rosendale, in the portion of the Town of Rosendale which is now Springvale.

In 1848, upon Wisconsin becoming a state, he was elected a member of the first Fond du Lac County board of supervisors. He later edited the newspaper the Oshkosh Democrat.

Daugherty died on March 3, 1856. His widow Abby Daugherty outlived him by 34 years and died in 1890.

== Political career ==
The first Wisconsin State Assembly convened pursuant to the new state Constitution, which had been adopted by a large majority vote of the people, from June 5 - August 31, 1848. Daugherty, at that time a Whig, was elected from the 2nd Assembly district of Fond du Lac County (the Towns of Alto, Metoman, Ceresco [now the Town of Ripon], Rosendale, Waupun, Oakfield and Seven-Mile-Creek [now Lamartine]). He was re-elected in 1848 for the second Assembly, which met from January 10 to April 2, 1849, but by this time he had switched his allegiance to the newly organized Free Soil Party. He was succeeded in 1850 by Whig Bertine Pinckney.

In 1849 he was elected a vice-president of the newly organized Wisconsin Agricultural Society for Fond du Lac County. In 1853 he initially appeared as the candidate for lieutenant governor on the People's Ticket under Edward D. Holton as the candidate for governor, but later withdrew in favor of Bertine Pinckney.
