= John Quincy Lane =

John Quincy Lane (February 19, 1831 – July 13, 1903) was an American Union brevet brigadier general during the period of the American Civil War. He received his appointment as brevet brigadier general dated to March 13, 1865. Born in Zanesville, Ohio, he was admitted to the Zanesville Bar where he practiced law until the beginning of the Civil War when he was commissioned by Governor Yates to recruit soldiers for the 97th Ohio Volunteer Infantry. This regiment served with the Army of the Cumberland. Lane served until the end of the war when he returned to Zanesville.
