= Asher Clayton Taylor =

United States Army general

Asher C. Taylor
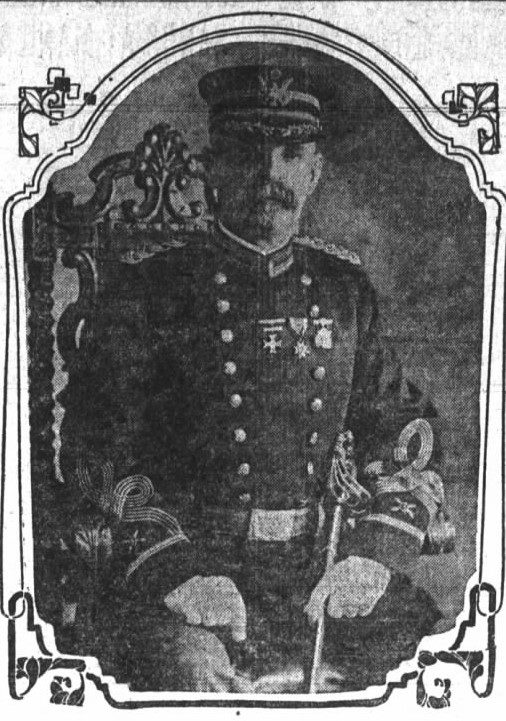
- Portrait of the soldier, 1913
- Born: February 21, 1842; New York, U.S.
- Died: January 20, 1922 (aged 79); San Francisco, California, U.S.
- Burial place: Arlington National Cemetery, Arlington County, Virginia
- Spouse: Mary Jane Branagan (died 1922)
- Children: 7
- Military career
- Allegiance: United States
- Branch: United States Army; Union Army
- Service years: 1861–1865 (USV); 1865–1904 (USA)
- Rank: Brigadier General
- Units: 3rd Reg. Wis. Vol. Infantry; 15th Reg. U.S. Infantry; U.S. Artillery Corps
- Conflicts: American Civil War; Spanish–American War

Asher Clayton Taylor (February 21, 1842 – January 20, 1922) was a career United States Army officer who served in the American Civil War and the Spanish–American War. He retired with the rank of brigadier general in 1904.

== Biography ==
Taylor was born in New York on February 21, 1842. He moved to LeRoy, Wisconsin, as a young boy and was educated there, until his college education at Hillsdale College, Michigan.

As a young man, he enlisted for duty in the American Civil War and served as a corporal in Company D of the 3rd Wisconsin Infantry Regiment. When the regiment re-enlisted as a veteran regiment in 1864, Taylor was the regiment's sergeant major. By the end of the war, he was commissioned a first lieutenant and appointed adjutant to the colonel of the regiment.

After the war, he was offered a commission in the regular army and served with the 15th U.S. Infantry Regiment through their Indian Wars campaigns in Colorado and New Mexico.

At the outbreak of the Spanish–American War, he was a colonel and served in the Cuban Campaign in and around Havana. Through his later years, he was assigned to the Artillery Corps and was regarded as an expert in light artillery. He was promoted to brigadier general in 1904 and retired that year. After his retirement, he and his wife toured the world, before settling down at Cottonwood, California.

== Personal life ==
In 1872, Taylor married Mary Jane Branagan, whose family were pioneer settlers of California. General Taylor and his wife had seven children together, though none of them survived him. Taylor, his wife, and their seven children are interred together at Arlington National Cemetery.
