= Sarah Dyer Hobart =

American poet

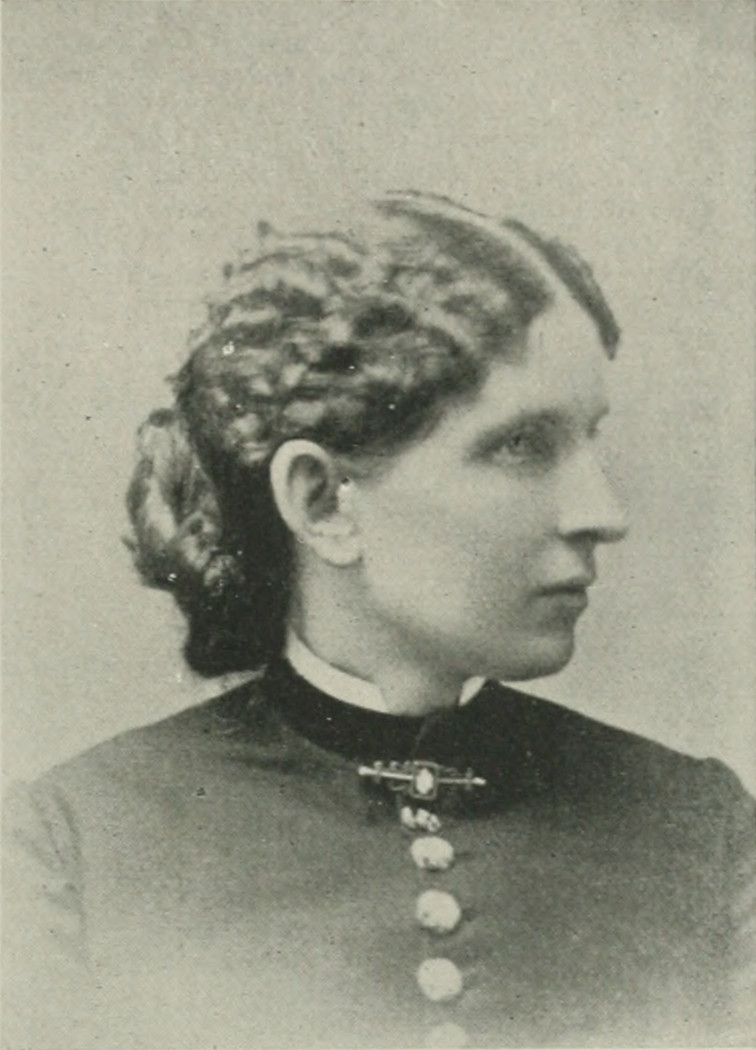
- Photo in A Woman of the Century
- Born: Sarah Dyer; September 20, 1845; Otsego, Wisconsin Territory, U.S.
- Died: November 1, 1921 (aged 76)
- Resting place: Fall River Cemetery, Fall River, Wisconsin
- Occupation: writer
- Spouse: Martin C. Hobart (m. 1866)
- Children: 3
- Writing career
- Pen name: Floyd Bentley
- Genres: poetry; prose; songs

Sarah Dyer Hobart (née, Dyer; pseudonym, Floyd Bentley; September 20, 1845 – November 1, 1921) was an American author of poetry, prose, and songs. Some of her more notable poems included, "The Record of Company B", "The Legend of St. Freda", and "Hector's Recompense". Her sonnets are perhaps her best work.

== Early life and education ==
Sarah Dyer was born in Otsego, Wisconsin Territory, September 20, 1845, or 1846. Her father, Wayne Bidwell Dyer (1813–1899), was the first man to make a home in the town, having arrived in Otsego in May 1844. Her parents were among the earliest settlers in that part of Wisconsin, and her early life was that of a pioneer.

She became well-educated.

== Career ==
She started her literary career at the age of eighteen, and was a contributor to the periodical press thereafter. Her poems soon made her name well known, and her sketches added to her popularity. Hobart's sonnets are perhaps her best work. For nearly fifty years, she wrote for the press using various pseudonyms. Her poems appeared in the leading magazines, including the Century, Lippincott's Magazine, Outing, and others. She was a regular contributor for a number of years to Harper's Bazar. As a regular prose contributor to the Toledo Blade, she wrote over the pen name of "Floyd Bentley." By 1880, she had turned her attention almost exclusively to writing melodies.

== Personal life ==
In 1866, she married Colonel Martin C. Hobart, who had just returned from the American Civil War. They had three children —Frances M., Mary V., and Burr E.— and lived in Fountain Prairie, Wisconsin.

Sarah Dyer Hobart died on November 1, 1921, and was buried at Fall River Cemetery, Fall River, Wisconsin.

== Selected works ==
=== Poems ===
- "The Record of Company B"
- "The Legend of St. Freda"
- "Hector's Recompense"
