= Martin C. Hobart =

19th century American politician

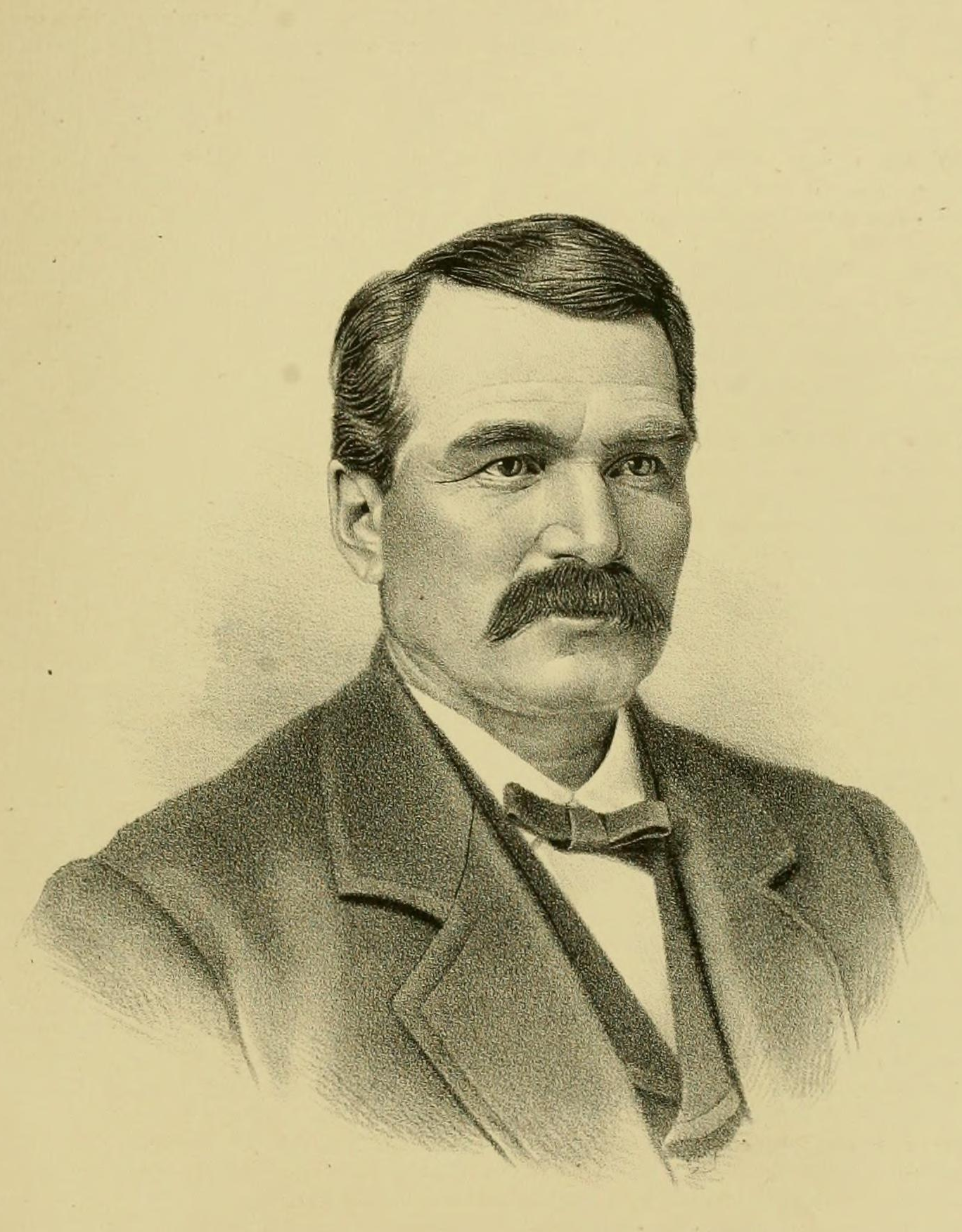
- Portrait from The History of Columbia County, Wisconsin (1880)

Member of the Wisconsin State Assembly from the Columbia 2nd district
- In office January 5, 1885 – January 3, 1887
- Preceded by: Michael Adams
- Succeeded by: Samuel Clark

Personal details
- Born: August 1, 1835 Niagara County, New York, U.S.
- Died: March 20, 1919 (aged 83) Columbia County, Wisconsin, U.S.
- Resting place: Fall River Cemetery, Fall River, Wisconsin
- Party: Republican
- Spouse: Sarah C. Dyer (m. 1866–1919)
- Children: Frances M. Hobart^{(b. 1868; died 1896)}; Mary V. Hobart^{(b. 1871; died 1935)}; Burr Eugene Hobart^{(b. 1875; died 1899)}

Military service
- Allegiance: United States
- Branch/service: United States Volunteers; Union Army
- Years of service: 1861–1865
- Rank: Captain, USV
- Unit: 7th Reg. Wis. Vol. Infantry
- Battles/wars: American Civil War: Northern Virginia campaign (1st.Lt., Co. B, 7th Wis.); First Battle of Rappahannock Station; Second Battle of Bull Run (W.I.A.); Chancellorsville campaign (Cpt., Co. B, 7th Wis.); Battle of Chancellorsville; Gettysburg campaign (Cpt., Co. B, 7th Wis.); Battle of Brandy Station; Battle of Gettysburg; Bristoe campaign (Cpt., Co. B, 7th Wis.); Battle of Mine Run (Cpt., Co. B, 7th Wis.); Overland Campaign (Cpt., Co. B, 7th Wis.); Battle of the Wilderness (P.O.W.)

Martin Calvin Hobart (August 1, 1835 – March 20, 1919) was an American farmer and Republican politician. During the American Civil War he served as an officer in the Iron Brigade of the Army of the Potomac. He served one term in the Wisconsin State Assembly, representing Columbia County.

== Biography ==
Hobart was born on August 1, 1835, in Niagara County, New York. He moved to Fountain Prairie, Wisconsin, in 1852 and made a living as a farmer. He married Sarah Dyer in 1866.

== Military career ==
During the American Civil War, Hobart enlisted with the 7th Wisconsin Infantry Regiment of the Union Army and was enrolled as a sergeant in Company B of that regiment. His regiment was sent to the eastern theater of the war. He was promoted to 1st lieutenant in July 1862, just before the start of the Northern Virginia campaign. He was wounded in the intense fighting at Gainesville, Virginia, during the first day of the Second Battle of Bull Run. His company captain was killed at Gainesville, and, despite his wound, Hobart was promoted to replace him.

After recuperating, he participated in the Battle of Chancellorsville, the Second Battle of Rappahannock Station, the Battle of Mine Run, and the Battle of Gettysburg, before being taken prisoner during the Battle of the Wilderness. While in prison, Hobart was promoted to major and then lieutenant colonel, but was never mustered at that rank. He was paroled from prison in February 1865, and mustered out with his regiment in July.

== Political career ==
Hobart was a member of the Assembly during the 1885 session. In addition, he was a member of the Columbia County, Wisconsin board. He was a Republican.

Hobart died at the age of 83 in Columbia County, on March 20, 1919.

Wisconsin State Assembly
Preceded by Michael Adams	Member of the Wisconsin State Assembly from the Columbia 2nd district January 5, 1885 – January 3, 1887	Succeeded by Samuel Clark
