= William H. Proctor =

19th century American politician

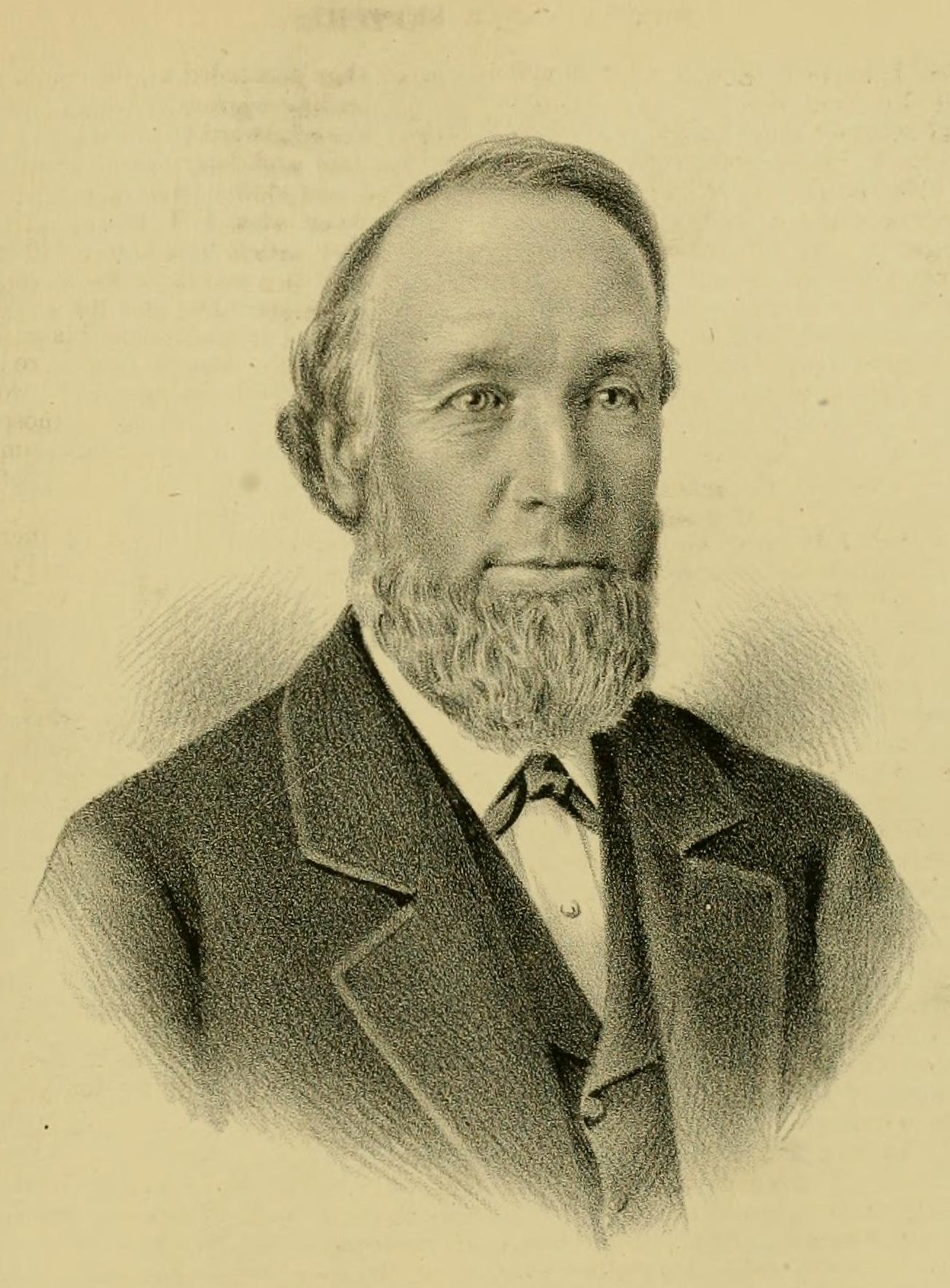
- Portrait from The History of Columbia County, Wisconsin (1880)

Member of the Wisconsin State Assembly from the Columbia 2nd district
- In office January 2, 1882 – January 1, 1883
- Preceded by: Evan W. Lloyd
- Succeeded by: Michael Adams

Personal details
- Born: October 19, 1827 Cavendish, Vermont, U.S.
- Died: March 12, 1902 (aged 74) Milwaukee, Wisconsin, U.S.
- Resting place: Fall River Cemetery, Fall River, Wisconsin
- Party: Republican
- Spouse: Angeline Elizabeth Lashier (m. 1857–1902)
- Children: Walter Asa Proctor; (b. 1874; died 1952)

William Henry Proctor (October 19, 1827 – March 12, 1902) was an American farmer and Republican politician. He served one term in the Wisconsin State Assembly, representing Columbia County.

== Biography ==
Proctor was born in Cavendish, Windsor County, Vermont, a son of Asa Proctor and Lorena (Wheelock) Proctor.

Proctor moved to Kalamazoo, Michigan in 1836. He then moved to Fountain Prairie, Wisconsin Territory, in 1844. Proctor was a farmer, and he inherited the farm in Fountain Prairie in 1855, when his mother died. He married Angeline Elizabeth Lashier (1838–1929) in 1857 and they had eight children together. He served on the Columbia County, Wisconsin Board of Supervisors and was involved in the Republican Party. In 1882, Proctor served in the Wisconsin State Assembly. Proctor died in Milwaukee, Wisconsin.

Wisconsin State Assembly
Preceded by Evan W. Lloyd	Member of the Wisconsin State Assembly from the Columbia 2nd district January 2, 1882 – January 1, 1883	Succeeded by Michael Adams
