= Henry Charles Brace =

American politician

Henry Charles Brace (March 23, 1823 – August 25, 1895) was a member of the Wisconsin State Assembly.

Brace was born in Stockbridge, Massachusetts. Other positions Brace held include chairman of the Town Board of Supervisors of Fountain Prairie, Wisconsin. He was a Republican.

Brace died in Harvey, Illinois and was buried in Fall River, Wisconsin.
