= Joseph N. P. Bird =

19th century American politician

Member of the Wisconsin State Assembly from the Waushara district
- In office January 4, 1869 – January 3, 1870
- Preceded by: Edgar Sears
- Succeeded by: Theophilus F. Metcalf

Personal details
- Born: October 9, 1835 Munnsville, New York, U.S.
- Died: September 4, 1886 (aged 50) Wautoma, Wisconsin, U.S.
- Resting place: Wautoma Union Cemetery, Wautoma, Wisconsin
- Party: Republican
- Spouse: Charlotte S. Parker (m. 1864–1886)
- Children: Katie Vinnie Bird^{(b. 1867; died 1942)}; Mabel Grace (Jameson)^{(b. 1870; died 1942)}; Robert K. Bird^{(b. 1880; died 1947)}

Military service
- Allegiance: United States
- Branch/service: United States Volunteers; Union Army
- Years of service: 1861–1864
- Rank: Captain, USV
- Unit: 7th Reg. Wis. Vol. Infantry
- Battles/wars: American Civil War: Second Battle of Bull Run (WIA)

Joseph N. P. Bird (October 9, 1835 – September 4, 1886) was an American farmer, Republican politician, and Wisconsin pioneer. He served one term in the Wisconsin State Assembly, representing Waushara County, and served as a Union Army officer through most of the American Civil War. His name is often abbreviated as J. N. P. Bird.

== Early life ==
Joseph Bird was born in Madison County, New York, in October 1835. At age two, his parents brought him to the Wisconsin Territory and settled at Madison. He was raised there and attended the only school which existed in Madison at the time. He then studied to be a baker, and worked in a confectionery shop until moving to Wautoma, Wisconsin, in 1859.

== Civil War service ==
At the outbreak of the American Civil War, Bird volunteered for service in the Union Army. He joined up with a company of volunteers known as the "Northwestern Tigers", which was organized into Company I of the 7th Wisconsin Infantry Regiment. Bird was elected 2nd lieutenant of the company on August 19, 1861. The regiment proceeded to Washington, D.C., for service in the eastern theater of the war. The 7th Wisconsin Infantry was organized into a brigade which soon became famous as the Iron Brigade of the Army of the Potomac. That Winter, Bird was promoted to 1st lieutenant.

In April 1862, Bird was court-martialed for "attempting to incite a sedition". The charges were said to be inspired by jealousy, and could have resulted in Bird's execution, but he was vindicated by the testimony of his captain, George H. Walther. After his acquittal, the company presented him with a ceremonial sword, sash, and belt.

The Iron Brigade earned its nickname from the first major battle they participated in at Gainesville, Virginia, during the first day of what would become the Second Battle of Bull Run, August 28, 1862. The brigade held its ground against at least three brigades of Confederates, but suffered heavy casualties. Bird was wounded in the battle and spent several months recuperating. In February 1863, Bird was promoted to captain and assigned command of a paroled prisoners' camp under XXII Corps, assisting freed Union prisoners in returning to duty or returning home. After a few months, the camp was reorganized as a camp for distribution of new recruits to their assignments. In the Winter of 1863–1864, he was assigned command of rendezvous and distribution for the 3rd division.

He returned briefly to his old regiment in August 1864 to complete his service. He mustered out at the end of his three-year enlistment on September 26, 1864.

== Postbellum career ==
Bird returned to Wautoma in December 1864, and began farming in the Spring of 1865. He was active in local politics and served many years as chairman of the town board and town treasurer. In 1868, he was elected to represent Waushara County in the Wisconsin State Assembly for the 1869 session. He subsequently served several years as president of the Waushara County Agricultural Society, beginning in 1874, and served as county clerk of the circuit court from 1882 until his death.

He died at his home in Wautoma in September 1886. His death was said to have been caused by lingering effects of his wounds received in the war, and had been confined to his bed for the last year of his life.

== Personal life ==
Joseph Bird married Charlotte T. Parker on February 11, 1864, at Woodstock, Illinois, during a furlough from service in the Civil War. They had at least three children.

Wisconsin State Assembly
Preceded by Edgar Sears	Member of the Wisconsin State Assembly from the Waushara district January 4, 1869 – January 3, 1870	Succeeded by Theophilus F. Metcalf
