= George H. Walther =

19th century American politician

Member of the Wisconsin State Assembly from the Milwaukee 9th district
- In office January 3, 1876 – January 1, 1877
- Preceded by: Frederick Zetteler
- Succeeded by: Christian Sarnow

Personal details
- Born: November 28, 1828 Betzigerode, Electorate of Hesse
- Died: July 30, 1895 (aged 66) Milwaukee, Wisconsin, U.S.
- Resting place: Forest Home Cemetery, Milwaukee, Wisconsin
- Party: Reform
- Spouses: Margaret Juneau (died 1861); Annette Loew (died 1929)
- Children: with Margaret Juneau; George J. Walther^{(b. 1857; died 1929)}; with Annette Low; Annette Maria Dorothea (Gallun)^{(b. 1866; died 1945)}; Pauline (Bausenbach)^{(b. 1868; died 1967)}; Edgar C. H. Walther^{(b. 1872; died 1933)}

Military service
- Allegiance: United States
- Branch/service: United States Volunteers; Union Army
- Years of service: 1861–1865
- Rank: Lt. Colonel, USV
- Unit: 7th Reg. Wis. Vol. Infantry; 34th Reg. Wis. Vol. Infantry; 35th Reg. Wis. Vol. Infantry
- Battles/wars: American Civil War

George H. Walther (November 28, 1828 – July 30, 1895) was a German American immigrant, surveyor, and politician. He served as a Union Army officer in the American Civil War and later served one term in the Wisconsin State Assembly, representing the north side of the city of Milwaukee.

== Biography ==
Walther was born in the village of Betzigerode, in what was then the Electorate of Hesse. He attended the military academy at the nearby city of Kassel and worked as a civil engineer and surveyor. In 1855, Walther emigrated to the United States and settled in Theresa, Dodge County, Wisconsin. He served as county surveyor and drainage commissioner for Dodge County. Walther was also justice of the peace and revenue inspector. During the American Civil War, Walther served as captain of Company I in the 7th Wisconsin Infantry Regiment and was wounded at the Battle of Gainesville. He later returned to service as major with the 34th Wisconsin Infantry Regiment and was then promoted to lieutenant colonel of the 35th Wisconsin Volunteer Infantry Regiment. In 1866, Walther moved to Milwaukee, Wisconsin. In 1876, Walther served in the Wisconsin State Assembly on the Reform Party ticket. Walther died at his home in Milwaukee, Wisconsin as a result of the wounds he suffered during the American Civil War.

== Personal life and family ==
George Walther married twice. His first wife was Margaret Juneau, a daughter of the founder of Milwaukee, Solomon Juneau.

Wisconsin State Assembly
Preceded by Frederick Zetteler	Member of the Wisconsin State Assembly from the Milwaukee 9th district January 3, 1876 – January 1, 1877	Succeeded by Christian Sarnow
