= William Sickles =

American Civil War Union Army soldier and Medal of Honor recipient

William H. Sickles
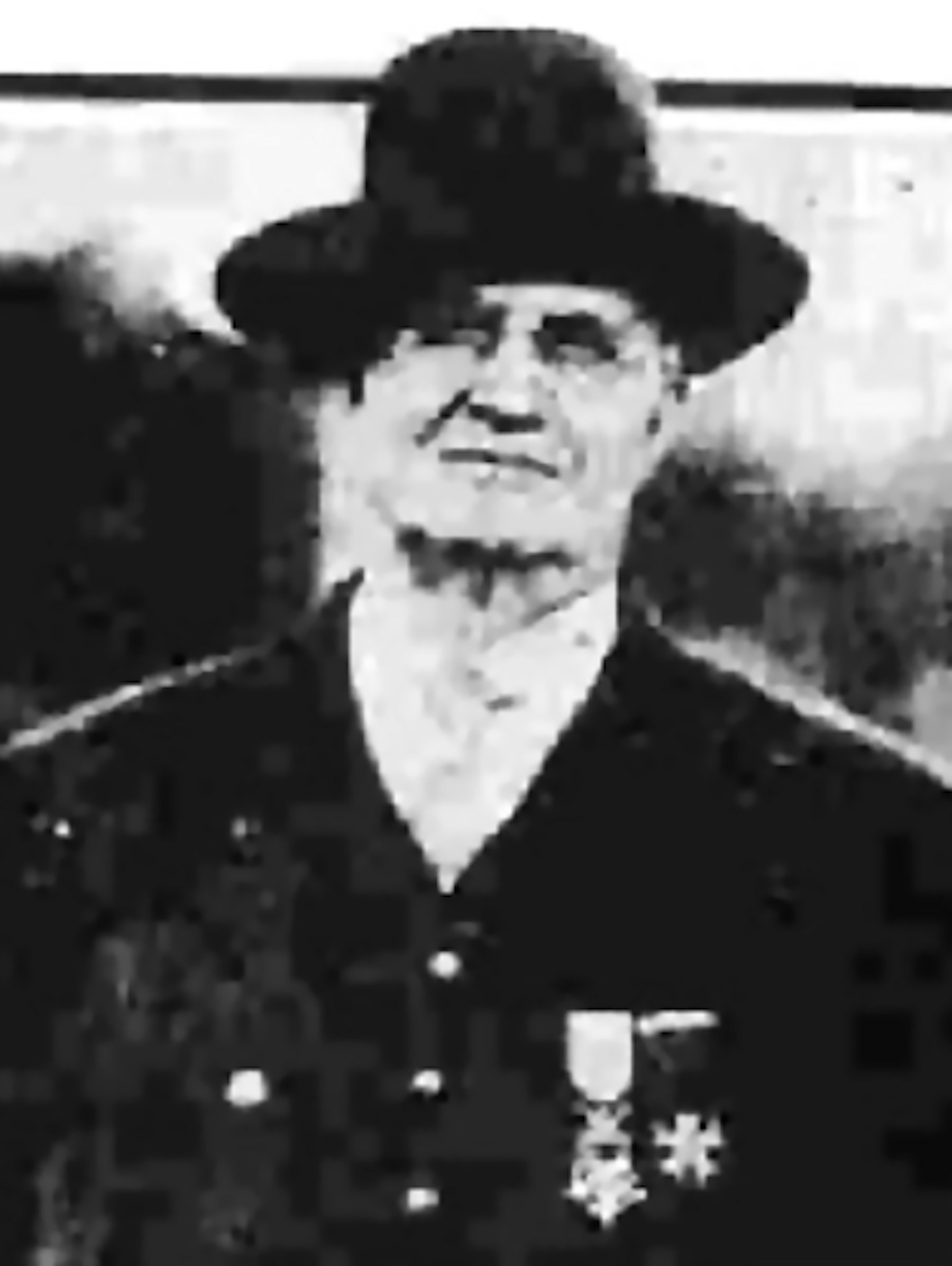
- Sickles in 1913
- Born: October 27, 1844; Danube, New York, U.S.
- Died: September 26, 1938 (aged 93); Orting, Washington, U.S.
- Burial place: Washington Soldiers Home Cemetery, Orting, Washington
- Military career
- Allegiance: Union
- Branch: Union Army
- Service years: 1861–1865
- Rank: Sergeant
- Unit: 7th Wisconsin Volunteer Infantry Regiment
- Conflicts: American Civil War
- Awards: Medal of Honor

William H. Sickles (October 27, 1844 – September 26, 1938) was an American soldier who served in the Union Army during the American Civil War. He received the Medal of Honor for his actions during the war.

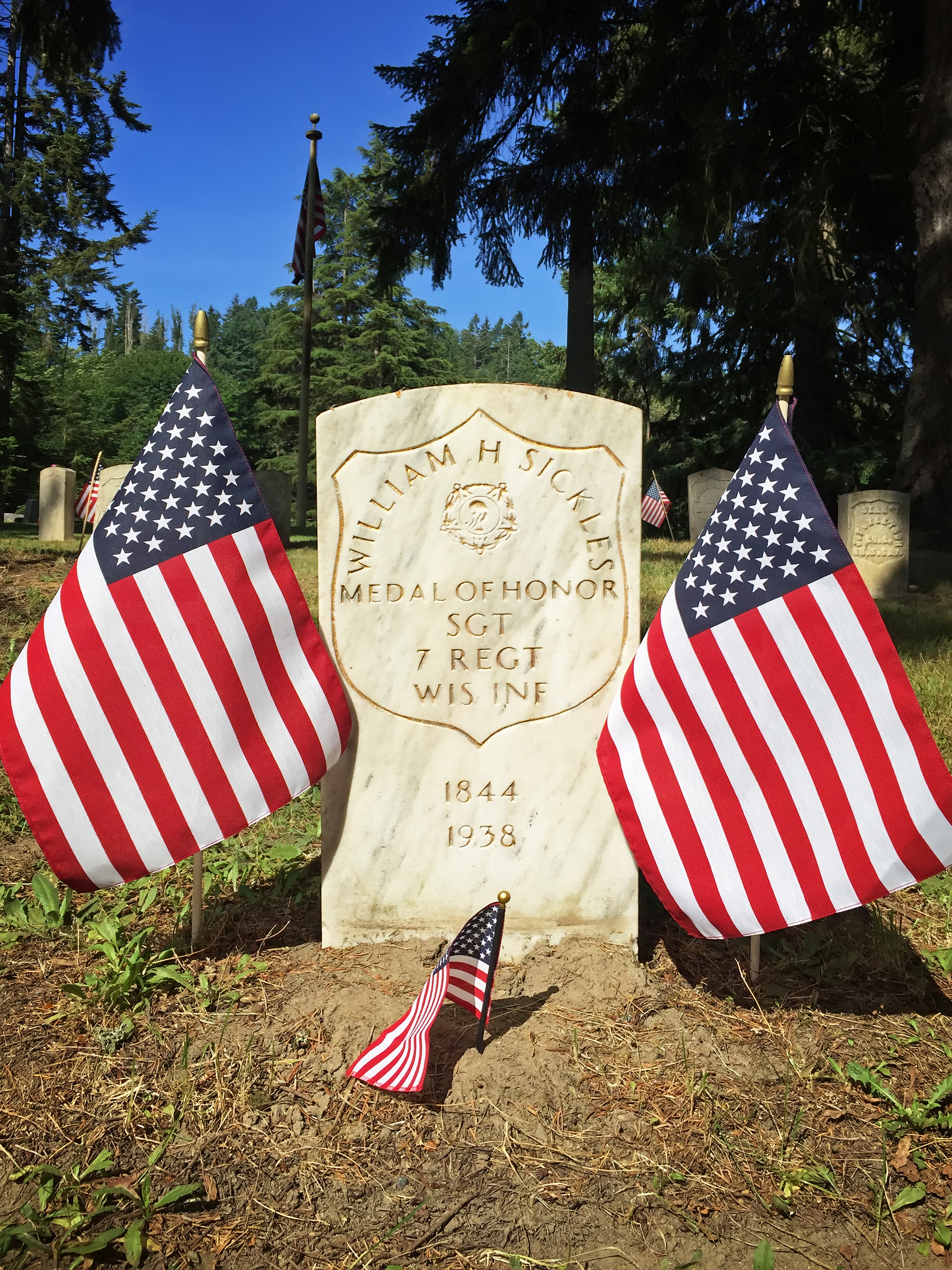
William Sickles's headstone at the Washington Soldiers Home Cemetery in Orting, Washington

== Biography ==
Sickles was born on October 27, 1844, in Danube, New York, but his official residence was listed as Fall River, Wisconsin. He joined the US Army in May 1861, and mustered out in July 1865.

Sickles served as justice of the peace in Orting, Washington.

Sickles died on September 26, 1938, at the Washington Soldiers Home in Orting and is buried there in Washington Soldiers Home Cemetery, near his comrade and fellow MOH recipient Albert O'Connor. He was the last surviving MOH recipient of the American Civil War.

== Medal of Honor citation ==
Citation:

With a comrade, attempted capture of a stand of Confederate colors and detachment of nine Confederates, actually taking prisoner three members of the detachment, dispersing the remainder, and recapturing a Union officer who was a prisoner in hands of the detachment.

== See also ==
- List of American Civil War Medal of Honor recipients: Q–S
