= 7th Wisconsin Infantry Regiment =

Union Army infantry regiment

- Flag of Wisconsin
- Active: September 2, 1861 – July 2, 1865
- Country: United States
- Allegiance: Union
- Branch: Infantry
- Size: Regiment
- Nickname: "The Huckleberries" or "The Hungry Seventh"
- Engagements: Battle of Second Bull Run; Battle of South Mountain; Battle of Antietam; Battle of Fredericksburg; Battle of Chancellorsville; Battle of Gettysburg; Battle of the Wilderness; Battle of Spotsylvania Court House; Battle of Cold Harbor; Siege of Petersburg; Battle of Weldon Railroad; Battle of Five Forks

Commanders
- Colonel: Joseph Van Dor
- Colonel: William W. Robinson
- Lt. Col.: John Benton Callis
- Colonel: Mark Finnicum
- Lt. Col.: Hollon Richardson

The 7th Wisconsin Infantry Regiment was a volunteer infantry regiment that served in the Union Army during the American Civil War. It was a component of the famous Iron Brigade in the Army of the Potomac throughout the war, participating in most of the critical battles of the eastern theater of the war, including Antietam, Gettysburg, and Grant's Overland Campaign.

== Service ==
The 7th Wisconsin was raised at Madison, Wisconsin, and mustered into Federal service September 2, 1861.

The regiment was initially equipped with smoothbore .69 caliber muskets converted from flintlock to percussion; in early 1862, they were replaced with the M1854 Austrian Lorenz rifle. Unlike their sister regiment the 2nd Wisconsin, which had Lorenz rifles in the unmodified .54 caliber, the 7th's were bored out to .58 caliber to fit a standard Minié ball. The regiment saw its first action at Second Bull Run, followed by severe and bloody fighting in the Maryland Campaign which produced a combined casualty rate of 323.

When the 7th Wisconsin marched into Pennsylvania in June 1863, it had not seen any combat action in nine months. During the first day of the Battle of Gettysburg on July 1, 1863, the 7th pushed a part of James J. Archer's Confederate brigade off McPherson's Ridge, and then stubbornly defended the heights later in the day before withdrawing to Seminary Ridge. When the I Corps retreated to Cemetery Hill, the Iron Brigade and the 7th Wisconsin were sent over to nearby Culp's Hill, where they entrenched. They saw comparatively little action the rest of the battle. The Badgers would suffer heavily during the battle, out of 370 effective men, 194 would not return after July 3. The regiment later served that year in the Bristoe and Mine Run Campaigns.

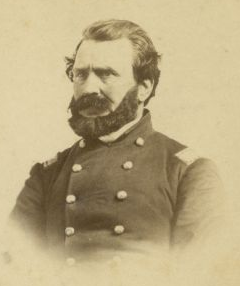
Colonel William W. Robinson

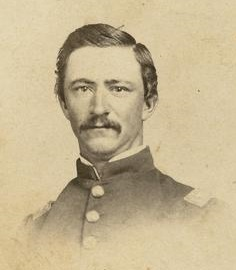
1st Lieutenant Hollon Richardson circa 1862

In the spring of 1864, the regiment signed up for another three years of service and thence fought in the Overland Campaign and the Siege of Petersburg. At The Battle of Spotsylvania, Virginia Chippewa/Ojibwa troops of the 7th Wisconsin aided troops of the 6th Wisconsin employing native skirmishing tactics.

The regiment participated in the Grand Review of the Armies on May 23, 1865, and then mustered out at Louisville, Kentucky, on July 2, 1865.

== Commanders ==
- Colonel Joseph Van Dor (September 2, 1861 – January 1862) resigned to accept a diplomatic post.
- Colonel William W. Robinson (January 1862 – May 6, 1864) began the war as lieutenant colonel and was wounded at the Second Battle of Bull Run. Later served as brigade commander between July 1863 and his resignation in June 1864.
  - Lt. Col. John Benton Callis (March 3, 1863 – June 1863) commanded the regiment when Colonel Robinson was recuperating from wounds. He was shot in the chest at the Battle of Gettysburg and resigned due to disability in December 1863. After the war, he was a U.S. congressman from Alabama.
- Colonel Mark Finnicum (May 6, 1864 – December 17, 1864) began the war as captain of Co. H and served as acting commander of the regiment when Colonel Robinson commanded the brigade. Wounded in the Overland Campaign and resigned.
- Lt. Col. Hollon Richardson (December 17, 1864 – July 2, 1865) began the war as a private in Co. A, he was commissioned a captain in February 1863 and served on the staff of General Solomon Meredith. He distinguished himself in this role during the Battle of Gettysburg and was later made acting lieutenant colonel of the regiment.

== Total enlistments and casualties ==
The 7th Wisconsin Infantry initially mustered 973 men and later recruited an additional 369 men, for a total of 1,342 men. The regiment suffered 10 officers and 271 enlisted men killed in action or who later died of their wounds, plus another 143 enlisted men who died of disease, for a total of 424 fatalities.

7th Wisconsin Infantry, Company Organization
Company	Original Moniker	Primary Place of Recruitment	Captain(s)
A	Lodi Guards	Columbia County, Lafayette County, Chippewa County and Dane County	George Bill (promoted); Hollon Richardson (promoted); James Johnson (wounded); Oley Grasley (mustered out)
B	Columbia County Cadets	Columbia County	James H. Huntington (resigned); George H. Brayton (KIA–Gainesville); Martin C. Hobart (promoted)
C	Platteville Guards	Grant County	Samuel J. Nasmith (promoted); Allen R. Bushnell (resigned); Jefferson Newman (KIA–Wilderness); Ethan A. Andrews (mustered out)
D	Stoughton Guards	Dane County	Emerson F. Giles (resigned); Alexander W. Bean (mustered out); Frederick R. Dearborn (resigned)
E	Marquette County Sharp Shooters	Marquette County and Waushara County	William D. Walker (resigned); Levi E. Pond (wounded); William H. Gildersleeve (mustered out)
F	Lancaster Union Guards	Grant County	John Benton Callis (promoted); Henry F. Young (mustered out); Francis A. Boynton (mustered out)
G	Grand Rapids Union Guards	Wood County, Portage County and Polk County	Samuel Stevens (resigned); Homer Drake (resigned); Frederick L. Warner (mustered out); Walter B. Peck (mustered out)
H	Badger State Guard	Grant County and Vernon County	Mark Finnicum (promoted); Robert C. Palmer (resigned); Robert Monteith (mustered out); Charles Fulks (mustered out); Nicholas Heber (mustered out)
I	Northern Tigers	Waushara County	George H. Walther (promoted); Joseph N. P. Bird (mustered out); Edson Terrill (mustered out)
K	Badger Rifles	Walworth County	Alexander Gordon Jr. (KIA–Fitzhugh's Crossing); George S. Hoyt (promoted); John M. Hoyt (mustered out)

== Notable people ==
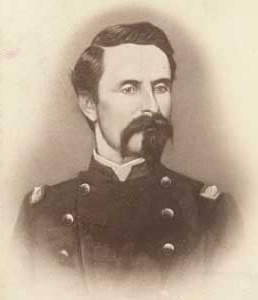
Major John Benton Callis

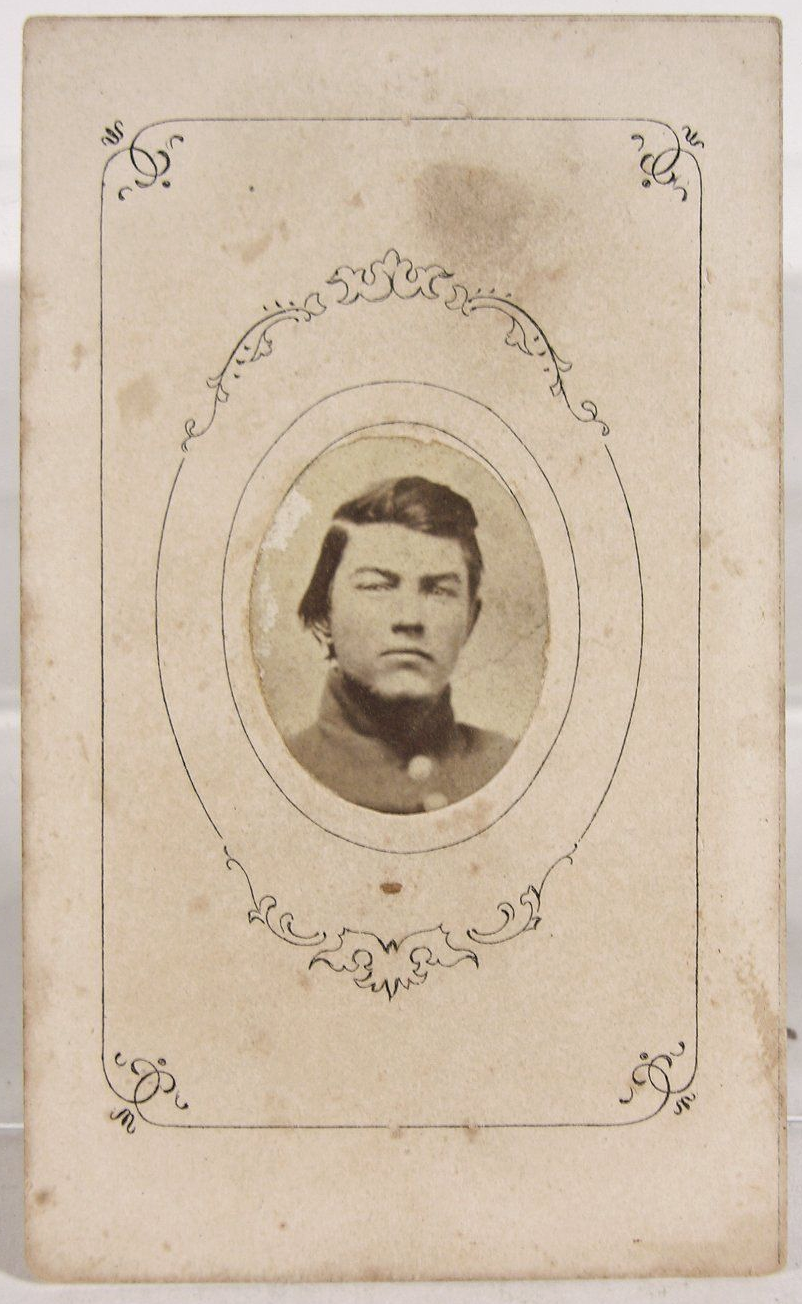
Private Julian C. Lewis of Company B, 7th Regiment - killed in action at the Second Battle of Bull Run

- David Cooper Ayres was regiment surgeon throughout the war. After the war he served as a Wisconsin legislator.
- Joseph N. P. Bird was 1st lieutenant of Co. I and was wounded at Gainesville. He was promoted to captain but was detailed from the regiment for most of 1863 and 1864. After the war he became a Wisconsin legislator.
- Allen R. Bushnell was 1st lieutenant of Co. C, and later promoted to captain. After the war became a Wisconsin legislator and U.S. congressman.
- Jefferson Coates was corporal and later sergeant in Co. H; he received a brevet to captain and the Medal of Honor for actions at Gettysburg, where he lost his eyes.
- Horace Ellis was sergeant in Co. A and received the Medal of Honor for actions at the Battle of Globe Tavern.
- Martin C. Hobart was captain of Co. B. He was wounded at Gainesville and captured at the Wilderness. After the war he became a Wisconsin legislator.
- Herman H. Hoffman was a corporal in Co. E. After the war he became a Wisconsin legislator.
- Henry G. Klinefelter was enlisted in Co. D and later commissioned a 2nd lieutenant in the 51st Wisconsin Infantry Regiment. After the war he became a Wisconsin legislator.
- John Monteith was enlisted in Co. H and rose to the rank of sergeant. He was wounded at Gainesville and discharged due to disability. After the war he became a Wisconsin legislator.
- Robert W. Monteith, brother of John Monteith, was enlisted and rose to become captain of Co. H.
- Samuel Monteith, brother of John Monteith, was a sergeant in Co. H and was killed at Antietam.
- Albert O'Connor was a sergeant in Co. A, received the Medal of Honor for actions at the Battle of Five Forks.
- Henry Palmer was briefly regiment surgeon but was promoted to brigade surgeon in April 1862, and was chief surgeon at York U.S. Army Hospital. After the war he was mayor of Janesville, Wisconsin, and Surgeon General of Wisconsin.
- Levi E. Pond was captain of Co. E. After the war he became a Wisconsin legislator.
- John Scanlon was drafted into Co. E in December 1864. After the war he became a Wisconsin legislator.
- Sidney Shufelt was drafted into Co. D in December 1864. After the war he became a Wisconsin legislator.
- William Sickles was a sergeant in Co. B and received the Medal of Honor for actions at the Battle of Five Forks.
- George H. Walther was captain of Co. I and was wounded at Gainesville. Later served as major of the 34th Wisconsin Infantry Regiment and lieutenant colonel of the 35th Wisconsin Infantry Regiment. After the war he served as a Wisconsin legislator.

== Nickname ==
According to veteran of the 2nd Wisconsin Infantry Regiment and Iron Brigade Cullen B. Aubery, the 7th Wisconsin was nicknamed "The Huckleberries" or "Huckleberry Seventh", it is also commonly called the "Hungry Seventh". This nickname was supposedly given to the regiment by Edward S. Bragg, commander of the 6th Wisconsin Infantry Regiment, who said the boys of the 7th were always talking about pies and other hard-to-get delicacies.

== See also ==
- Iron Brigade
- List of Wisconsin Civil War units
- Wisconsin in the American Civil War
