= Nashold 20-sided Barn =

- U.S. National Register of Historic Places
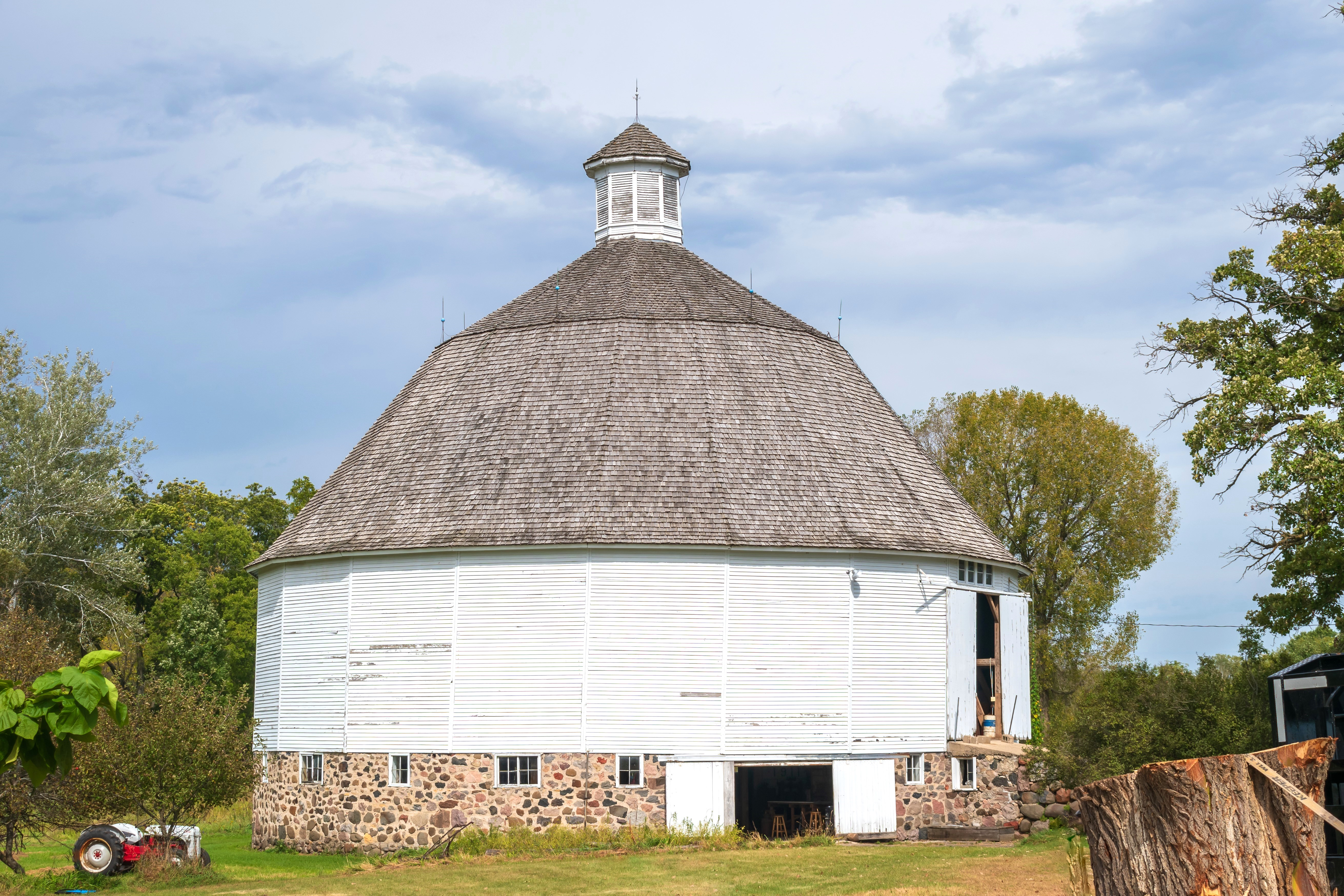

- Location within Wisconsin Location within the United States
- Nearest city: Fall River, Wisconsin
- Coordinates: 43°25′44″N 89°5′15″W
- Area: 1 acre (0.40 ha)
- Built: 1911
- Architectural style: Centric Barn
- NRHP reference No.: 88000091
- Added to NRHP: February 11, 1988

The Nashold 20-sided Barn is a round barn in Fountain Prairie, Wisconsin. The barn was built in 1911, at which time round barns were a popular agricultural innovation. The barn has a 40-foot (12 m) silo at its center; the central silo created a more efficient layout for feeding cows. An earthen ramp to the barn's hayloft was also used to store milk, an innovation which was uncommon in similar barns. The Nashold barn is one of the few surviving round barns from its era, making it an important part of Wisconsin's agricultural history. On February 11, 1988, the barn was added to the National Register of Historic Places.
