= Adam Pœrtner =

American mason, miller and politician

John Adam Pœrtner, Poertner or Portner (January 3, 1817 – July 7, 1910) was an American mason, miller and politician from Milwaukee, Wisconsin.

== Background and private life ==
Pœrtner was born in 1817 in the Grand Duchy of Hesse, and emigrated to the United States, arriving in New York City on May 26, 1839. He came to Milwaukee in the Wisconsin Territory in 1843. He was naturalized on November 14, 1844. As of the 1850 Federal census, he was working as a mason, and married to Caroline Portner [spellings were not consistent], who was a 28 year old native of France, and they had four children. By 1856, he was among the freeholders of the Sixth Ward to petition the Milwaukee Common Council for street improvements.

In the 1870 census, he is reported as running a mill; he and Caroline (or Carolina) are reported with 8 children, from Adam Jr. (26, a clerk at the mill) to Lotte, 7. By 1874, he was living on Court Street as he would continue to do for the rest of his life.

== Politics ==
By 1854, he was nominated as a delegate from the Second Ward to the Milwaukee County Democratic convention.

In July 1856, he was a railroad commissioner for the Sixth Ward., and was re-elected in April 1857 In April 1861, he was elected to the Milwaukee Common Council from the Sixth Ward, with 319 votes to 241 for W.R. Taylor. He was also a member of the Milwaukee County board of supervisors in this period.

In 1862, a caucus presided over by the incumbent, Democrat Adam Finger, nominated Pœrtner for the Wisconsin State Assembly seat representing the 6th Milwaukee County district (the 6th and 9th wards of the City of Milwaukee) for 1863. In the November general election he defeated Republican former Assemblyman John Rugee (Finger had won the seat from Rugee in 1861).

Immediately after the election, the Wisconsin State Journal reported that Pœrtner had been "[a]mong the leaders of the mob in Milwaukee, to resist the draft" and called for his arrest and confinement, asserting "Such a man has no right, to sit in the Legislature of a loyal State."

Pœrtner was assigned to the standing committee on the state prison. He resigned from the board of supervisors since he would not be able to attend. He was succeeded in the next term by another Democrat, Frederick Zetteler.

By 1877, he was again a member of the board of supervisors for the 6th ward, and nominated by the local Democrats for re-election; and again in 1878

== Later years ==
He is listed in the 1880 census as "retired" and living with Carolina and three children; in the 1900 census as widowed and living with a daughter and two grandchildren; and in the 1910 census as living with the same daughter (Josephine or Josephina) and one granddaughter.

He died July 7, 1910, of "senile debility and exhaustion" and was buried at Union Cemetery in Milwaukee.
