= Horace Ellis =

American soldier (1843–1867)

- Civil War era Army Medal of Honor
- Born: May 23, 1843; Mercer County, Pennsylvania
- Died: June 27, 1867 (aged 24); Eagle Point, Wisconsin
- Military career
- Allegiance: United States of America; Union
- Branch: United States Army; Union Army
- Service years: 1861 - 1865
- Rank: Sergeant
- Units: Company A, 7th Wisconsin Volunteer Infantry Regiment
- Conflicts: American Civil War; *Battle of Globe Tavern
- Awards: Medal of Honor

Horace Ellis (May 23, 1843 – June 27, 1867) served in the Union Army during the American Civil War. He received the Medal of Honor for his actions during the Battle of Globe Tavern.

Ellis was born in Mercer County, Pennsylvania. He joined the 7th Wisconsin Infantry from Chippewa Falls, Wisconsin in July 1861. He was detailed to the 4th US Artillery Regiment from February 1863 to January 1864. He was wounded at the Battle of White Oak Road, and mustered out in July 1865.

Ellis died in Eagle Point, Wisconsin, aged only 24, and was buried in O'Neil Creek Cemetery.

== Medal of Honor citation ==
Citation:

The President of the United States of America, in the name of Congress, takes pleasure in presenting the Medal of Honor to Private Horace Ellis, United States Army, for extraordinary heroism on 21 August 1864, while serving with Company A, 7th Wisconsin Infantry, in action at Weldon Railroad, Virginia, for capture of flag of 16th Mississippi (Confederate States of America).

== See also ==
- List of American Civil War Medal of Honor recipients: A–F
