= Frederick Zetteler =

American politician (1812–1896)

Frederick Tobias Zetteler (February 11, 1812 – August 19, 1896) was an American real estate developer, pioneer, and politician.

Born in Rotterdam, Netherlands, Zetteler was the son of a royal tailor. On March 5, 1841 he married Sarah Jacoba (Smith) Fagg, a widow who was a Vlissingen native from a prominent local family of English and Dutch ancestry, who had managed the family business for two years after the death of her husband, Captain John Fagg. After Zetteler's second bankruptcy the family came to the United States, taking passage at Antwerp on a sailing ship that landed them at New York City. They proceeded to Albany, New York and thence by canals and the Great Lakes to Milwaukee, landing July 3, 1848, and there they settled down on a farm. In 1853 Zetteler moved the family to Madison, Wisconsin and opened a general store. The mother and children ran the store and Zetteler worked for official offices of the State, including the Secretary of State of Wisconsin and the State Register of Deeds. He became a notary public in 1855.

In 1858, a fire destroyed all of the family's property, and Zetteler returned to Milwaukee and went into the real estate business as a developer. He served as a justice of the peace, a notary public, and was a deputy United States Marshal. In 1863 Zetteler was elected to serve as a Democrat in the 6th Milwaukee County district (the 6th and 9th wards of the City of Milwaukee) of the Wisconsin State Assembly, succeeding fellow Democrat Adam Pœrtner (or Poertner). He was assigned to the standing committee on engrossed bills. He was succeeded in the 1865 term by Jacob Oberman, another Democrat.

In 1867, he was elected as a delegate to the convention which revised the city charter of Milwaukee. In 1874, Zetteler was elected to the Assembly (again as a Democrat), this time from the 9th Milwaukee County district (9th and 10th wards), with 922 votes, against 675 for Republican Andrew Keye. In this second term, he served simultaneously with his stepson Peter Fagg, who represented the 2nd Milwaukee County district. He was not a candidate for re-election, and was succeeded by George H. Walther of the Reform Party (to which Peter Fagg belonged).
