= William W. Robinson =

Union Army colonel and consul (1819–1903)

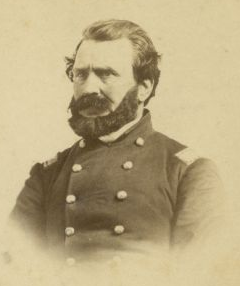
- Born: December 14, 1819; Fair Haven, Vermont, U.S.
- Died: April 27, 1903 (aged 83) Seattle, Washington, U.S.
- Buried: Fort Lawton Cemetery, Fort Lawton, Washington
- Allegiance: United States
- Branch: United States Army; Union Army
- Service years: 1846–1848; 1861–1865
- Rank: Colonel, USV
- Commands: 7th Reg. Wis. Vol. Infantry; Iron Brigade
- Conflicts: Mexican–American War American Civil War: Northern Virginia campaign (Col., in command, 7th Wis.); First Battle of Rappahannock Station; Second Battle of Bull Run (W.I.A.); Fredericksburg campaign (Col., in command, 7th Wis.); Battle of Fredericksburg; Mud March; Chancellorsville campaign (Col., in command, 7th Wis.); Battle of Chancellorsville; Gettysburg campaign (Col., in command, 7th Wis.); Battle of Brandy Station; Battle of Gettysburg (took command, 1st Brig., 1st Div., I Corps); Bristoe campaign (Col., in command, 1st Bde., 1st Div., I Corps); Battle of Mine Run (Col., in command, 1st Bde., 1st Div., I Corps); Overland Campaign (Col., in command, 7th Wis.); Battle of the Wilderness (took command, 1st Bde., 4th Div., V Corps); Battle of Spotsylvania Court House; Battle of North Anna; Battle of Cold Harbor
- Alma mater: Norwich Military Academy
- Spouse: Sarah Jane Fisk
- Children: Edward L. Robinson; William Wallace Robinson Jr.; Leonora Colista (Richardson); Herbert Fisk Robinson; Inez Robinson
- Other work: U.S. consul to Madagascar (1875–1887)

William Wallace Robinson Sr. (December 14, 1819 – April 27, 1903) was a Union Army officer and American diplomat. He commanded the 7th Wisconsin Infantry Regiment in the famed Iron Brigade of the Army of the Potomac through most of the Civil War, and was U.S. consul to the Merina Kingdom of Madagascar for 12 years (1875–1887).

== Early life ==
William Robinson was born in Fair Haven, Vermont, in 1819. His parents had moved to Vermont from Connecticut after the War of 1812. He was educated at Castleton Academy in Castleton, Vermont, and then attended Norwich Military Academy.

After completing his education, Robinson taught school in Vermont, New Jersey, and finally Cleveland, Ohio, where he moved in 1840. After two years, he went west and prospected for land in the Wisconsin Territory, but ultimately returned to Ohio where he enlisted for service in the Mexican–American War. He was commissioned lieutenant of Company G in the 3rd Ohio Infantry Regiment, under Colonel Samuel Ryan Curtis. He was promoted to captain during the war, and mostly engaged in skirmishes along the San Juan River.

After the war, he worked as a contractor participating in the California Gold Rush, but soon relocated to the Minnesota Territory, where he became one of the founders of the settlement of Wilton, in Waseca County. While living in Minnesota, he was made a colonel of the territorial militia and brought his expertise to training and drilling the militia volunteers.

== Civil War service ==
Robinson moved to Sparta, Wisconsin, in 1858, and, at the outbreak of the American Civil War, he was appointed lieutenant colonel of the 7th Wisconsin Infantry Regiment under Colonel Joseph Van Dor. The regiment departed Wisconsin in September 1861 for service in the eastern theater of the war.

=== Washington (Fall 1861 – Spring 1862) ===
The 7th Wisconsin Infantry arrived near Washington in October 1861. It was the last of the original four regiments to join the brigade of General Rufus King. The other regiments of the brigade were the 2nd Wisconsin, 6th Wisconsin, and 19th Indiana infantry regiments. They spent most of the fall constructing fortifications and guarding railroad bridges around Washington, D.C.

Shortly after joining the brigade, Colonel Van Dor left and returned to Wisconsin, leaving Lt. Colonel Robinson in command of the regiment. Van Dor was ultimately offered a diplomatic post, and Robinson was promoted to colonel of the 7th Wisconsin Infantry. This coincided with other leadership shake-ups in the brigade as less-experienced politically appointed officers were replaced with more qualified and experienced men. Colonel Robinson led the regiment through the next three years of the war.

=== Northern Virginia (Summer 1862) ===
In the spring of 1862, the 7th Wisconsin, with their brigade, made their first advance into Confederate territory. They went south to Falmouth, Virginia, on the Rappahannock River, across from Fredericksburg, Virginia, where they remained through most of McClellan's Peninsula campaign. They were put on alert to reinforce McClellan during the campaign, but were called away to participate in a fruitless chase of Stonewall Jackson. They ultimately returned to Falmouth.

In July, after General John Pope replaced McClellan in overall command of the Union Army, the Iron Brigade was assigned to participate in raids against Confederate infrastructure and logistics south of the Rappahannock. The most notable is the raid on Frederick's Hall, in the first week of August, intended to cut the Virginia Central Railroad. Part of the brigade was detached on a rapid march to the objective.

The 7th Wisconsin, with the 2nd Wisconsin, moved south at an ordinary pace to cover the retreat of the saboteur detachment. They encountered a patrol of Confederate cavalry and drove them away, but soon realized that a large enemy force under J. E. B. Stuart was present in the area. The 2nd and 7th Wisconsin diverted west and would not be able to meet or support their detachment. The detachment proceeded with their mission and were ultimately able to return safely.

=== Second Bull Run (August 1862) ===
Immediately after returning to Falmouth, on August 9, 1862, the brigade received an order to proceed to Cedar Mountain, Virginia, to reinforce General Pope. They departed immediately, but the Battle of Cedar Mountain was over two days before they arrived at the site. They assisted in burying the dead, then participated in skirmishing associated with the First Battle of Rappahannock Station along the new defensive line at the Rappahannock River.

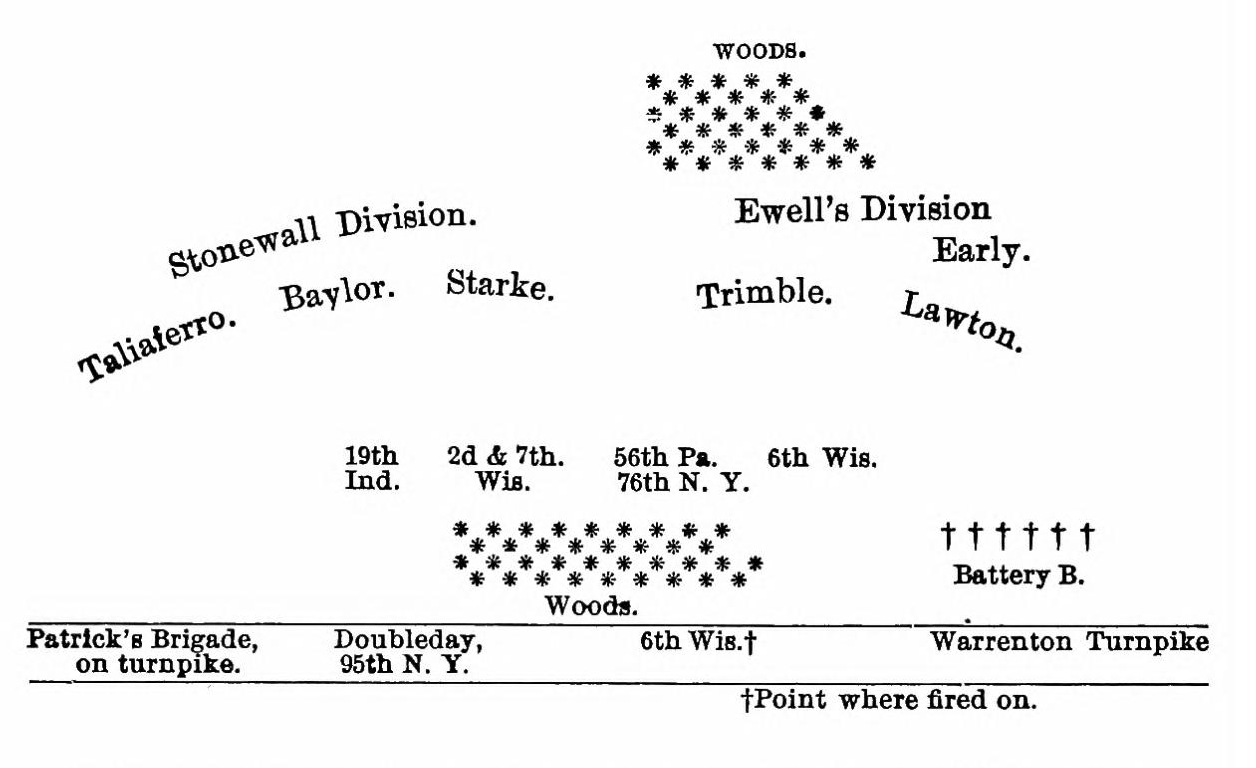
A sketch by Major Rufus Dawes of the location of forces at the Battle of Gainesville

After Stonewall Jackson successfully maneuvered around the flank of the Union army, the order was given to fall back to Centreville, Virginia, in an attempt to surround Jackson's Corps. On the evening of August 28, while marching northeast with three other brigades on the Warrenton Turnpike, Robinson's brigade encountered Jackson's corps near Gainesville, Virginia.

General Irvin McDowell, who commanded their division, was convinced that the Confederates represented an inconsequential force, and ordered the brigades to proceed on their march toward Centreville. However, when the Confederates opened up cannon fire, General John Gibbon ordered the 7th Wisconsin and their brigade to engage the enemy and attempt to capture the artillery. A severe battle ensued as the lone brigade faced a combined assault from five brigades of Stonewall Jackson's corps. The 2nd Wisconsin was the first regiment engaged, taking fire from three sides. The 7th Wisconsin came up directly among the 2nd to reinforce them, with the 19th Indiana on their left and the 6th Wisconsin on their right.

The fighting at Gainesville is often referred to in historical documents as the "Battle of Gainesville" and represented the first day of fighting in the Second Battle of Bull Run. Despite being outnumbered by more than 3-to-1, the brigade held their ground and the fighting ended indecisively around midnight. This is where the nickname "Iron Brigade" was first applied to their unit. (Note: Quiner, p. 447; Here the brigade acquired its designation of the "Iron Brigade of the West.") The 2nd and 7th Wisconsin regiments took the bulk of the casualties in the battle, and all three field officers of the 7th, including Colonel Robinson, were wounded. The 2nd and 7th Wisconsin were temporarily consolidated under the command of Lt. Colonel Lucius Fairchild, who was one of the last-standing field officers of the two regiments.

Robinson's horse had been shot out from under him in the battle, and he was subsequently shot in the leg, breaking the bone. He was carried off the field and sent to Washington, he spent the next three months recuperating and missed the events of the Maryland campaign and the Battle of Antietam.

=== Fredericksburg and Chancellorsville (Winter 1862 – Spring 1863) ===
Colonel Robinson was able to return to the 7th Wisconsin in December 1862. He led the regiment through the two winter campaigns against Fredericksburg, Virginia—the Battle of Fredericksburg and the aborted Mud March—but they were not engaged in serious fighting in either effort. The Iron Brigade spent most of the rest of the winter camped at Belle Plains, Virginia, where they were reorganized and resupplied. During this time, President Abraham Lincoln reviewed the Iron Brigade and their corps at their camp.

In April, the campaigning resumed with the Battle of Chancellorsville, where the 7th Wisconsin and the Iron Brigade were ordered to cross, then re-cross the Rappahannock, and ultimately acted as rearguard as the Union army abandoned the offensive again.

=== Gettysburg (Summer 1863) ===
Following the retreat from Chancellorsville, General Robert E. Lee began massing his forces in Culpepper County, several miles west of the Chancellorsville battlefield, in preparation for another offensive into northern territory. General Joseph Hooker, who was then in command of the Union Army, sent a force to conduct reconnaissance of the area. The 7th Wisconsin was temporarily attached as infantry support to this cavalry action. The Union force encountered Lee's cavalry under J. E. B. Stuart near Brandy Station, Virginia. Believing that they had vastly superior numbers, the Union forces were ordered to attack in a pincer maneuver. The 7th Wisconsin was part of the left wing of the attack, under General David McMurtrie Gregg, which made a hook south of Brandy Station and came north to find an overwhelming force of enemy cavalry. They skirmished through the morning of June 9 in the Battle of Brandy Station, then retreated toward Bealeton, Virginia, to meet the rest of the Army of the Potomac on the march north to Pennsylvania, to intercept Lee's attack.

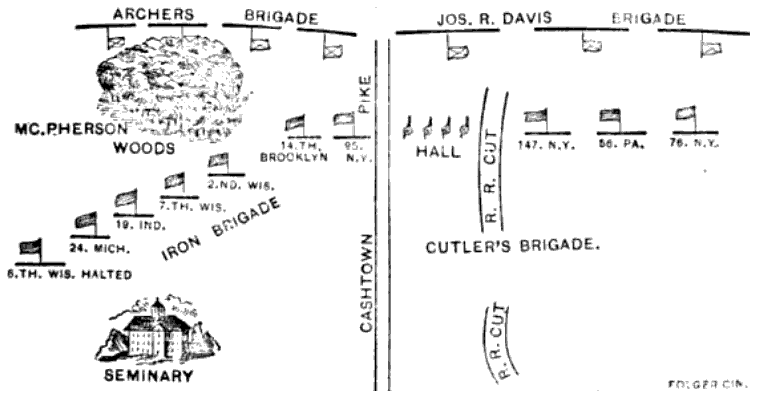
Sketch by Major Rufus Dawes of the location of forces at McPherson Woods on the first day of the Battle of Gettysburg

For days, they marched rapidly back toward Washington, then further north into Maryland, barely stopping for rest. They arrived at South Mountain on June 27 and crossed into Pennsylvania on June 30. In the early morning hours of July 1, they received orders to urgently proceed to Gettysburg. On that first day of the Battle of Gettysburg, the Iron Brigade was in the vanguard division (under General James S. Wadsworth) and was the second brigade to deploy in line of battle on McPherson Ridge, under direct instruction from General John F. Reynolds, who was in command of I Corps. General Reynolds was shot dead while giving orders to the brigade.

To their right, the first brigade, under their former commander General Lysander Cutler was forced back in 30 minutes, taking severe casualties, but reformed behind them. The Iron Brigade faced off against a rebel brigade under General James J. Archer, and was far more successful, enveloping them on three sides and capturing General Archer and a regiment of his men, then taking position in the Herbst Woods. Archer was the first general officer of Lee's army to be taken captive in the war.

Through midday, more Confederate and Union forces began to arrive at the battlefield, but the Confederates struck first, with an attack in the early afternoon. The Iron Brigade came under assault from two sides, and after a fierce battle, fell back to Seminary Ridge. General Solomon Meredith, in command of the Iron Brigade, was wounded during this maneuver and had to leave the field. Colonel Robinson was ordered to take command of the brigade and led them through the rest of the battle.

By the afternoon, virtually all of I Corps was in line of battle on Seminary Ridge. According to Colonel Robinson's account of the battle, this is where he took the worst of his casualties, as I Corps faced off against the combined attack of the Second and Third Confederate Corps. They successfully held off the Confederate offensive, but were ordered to fall back to the south of the city when XI Corps, on their right, collapsed into full retreat. (Note: There is some dispute over where the retreat began, as the commanders of I Corps and XI Corps blamed each other. But for the purpose of this bio, I'm going with the account of Lt. Colonel Dawes, taken from his contemporaneous notes commanding the 6th Wisconsin Infantry.)

After an orderly retreat, the Iron Brigade was next ordered to take position on Culp's Hill, defending the right flank of the Union line. They dug trenches and built fortifications through the afternoon as more divisions arrived on the battlefield, and slept in their trenches that night. On the second and third days of the battle, July 2 and 3, the brigade received artillery fire throughout the day but was not engaged by the enemy infantry.

Over 50% of the Iron Brigade was killed or wounded at Gettysburg, with most of the casualties occurring on the first day. Colonel Robinson's account of the Iron Brigade's actions during the Battle of Gettysburg can be found in the Official War Records, Series 1, Volume 27, Part 1, Item 37.

On July 4, Lee began his retreat from Gettysburg.

=== Bristoe, Mine Run, and Reorganization (Fall 1863 – Spring 1864) ===
On July 25, the Iron Brigade returned to Warrenton, Virginia, and then proceeded back to their previous position on the Rappahannock. In October, Lee launched a brief counter-offensive at Bristoe Station which sparked a series of maneuvers and skirmishes known as the Bristoe campaign. The Iron Brigade participated but did not see significant fighting in either the Bristoe campaign, nor the subsequent Union offensive known as the Battle of Mine Run.

In January 1864, the 7th Wisconsin Infantry officially achieved Veteran status and those who re-enlisted were given a furlough to return to Wisconsin. Colonel Robinson and the re-enlisted veterans traveled by train but were delayed by an accident near Massillon, Ohio, where the locals welcomed them into their homes to rest for the night. They eventually arrived in Wisconsin and were celebrated at a ceremony in Madison hosted by Governor James T. Lewis.

=== Overland Campaign (Summer 1864) ===
In March 1864, General Ulysses S. Grant was appointed the commander of the Union Army in the Virginia theatre, replacing General George Meade, who had been in command since the Gettysburg Campaign. That same month, the Iron Brigade veterans returned to camp and engaged in drilling and reorganization under the new commander. For the next phase of the war, they would be the 1st Brigade, 4th Division, in Gouverneur K. Warren's V Corps. In the reorganization of the corps, General Lysander Cutler returned to command of the Iron Brigade, and Robinson returned to command of the 7th Wisconsin Infantry.

On May 3, 1864, the Iron Brigade returned to campaign, marching from their camp at Culpeper Court House. They arrived at the Wilderness Tavern south of the Rapidan River at dusk on May 4. On the morning of May 5, the Iron Brigade, along with their division, marched southwest and encountered the enemy in the woods at the start of what became the Battle of the Wilderness. The fighting in the woods was confusing, and after initial success, the brigade had to withdraw from the woods.

In the afternoon, their division received new orders to detach and proceed to the south to reinforce Winfield Scott Hancock's II Corps and John Sedgwick's VI Corps. Near dawn on May 6, the fighting resumed as Sedgwick launched his attack. The Iron Brigade attacked the left flank of the Confederate Third Corps under A. P. Hill. The Union made three attempts to storm the enemy lines, but were repulsed as elements of the Confederate First Corps under James Longstreet arrived and counterattacked. Before the last assault, Colonel Robinson spoke directly to General Wadsworth and is believed to be the last person to speak to Wadsworth before the general was shot and mortally wounded.

The Union forces fell back under the Confederate counterattack but stabilized along the Brock Road, between Wilderness Tavern and Todds Tavern, Virginia. In the aftermath of General Wadsworth's death, General Cutler took command of the division and Colonel Robinson was again placed in command of the Iron Brigade.

On the night of May 7, V Corps was ordered to proceed southeast toward Spotsylvania Court House, as Grant attempted to maneuver his army in between Lee and the Confederate capitol, Richmond. Arriving at Laurel Hill, northwest of Spotsylvania Court House, on the morning of May 8, they found a Confederate force had already reached the site and occupied strong defensive positions. During the Battle of Spotsylvania Court House, the Iron Brigade participated in four Union assaults against the Confederate fortifications between May 8 and May 12. On the afternoon of May 12, they marched to their left and engaged in fighting at the "Bloody Angle".

Following the fighting at Spotsylvania Court House, Colonel Robinson was reported wounded in correspondence attributed to Colonel Thomas S. Allen, but this report may have been incorrect as several other casualties in the report were known to be false. (Note: Dawes, p. 272; we have letters from Washington informing us that Colonel Bragg, Lieutenant Colonel Dawes, and Captain Kellogg of the sixth regiment are killed...) There was no interruption in Colonel Robinson's command of the brigade through the next several weeks, so if he was injured it would have been minor.

After days of skirmishing and shelling at the fortifications around Spotsylvania Court House, V Corps was again ordered to move to the south, continuing the maneuver toward Richmond. After stopping at Guinea's Station and the Po River, they crossed the North Anna River near dusk on May 23, 1864. That evening, before they were able to fully establish their battle lines, they were attacked by Confederates of A. P. Hill's Third Corps in the first action of the Battle of North Anna. After initially giving ground, the division rallied and drove the Confederates from the field.

After more days of entrenched stalemate, on the evening of May 26, Grant again ordered the Union divisions to stealthily evacuate their lines and proceed south around the Confederate right flank. They crossed the Pamunkey River on May 28 and set defensive lines behind the cavalry Battle of Haw's Shop. They moved again on May 29 and May 30, encountering divisions of the Confederate 1st Corps at the Battle of Totopotomoy Creek and repelled them.

Over the next two weeks, they were engaged in the trench warfare of the Battle of Cold Harbor. On June 6, by order of General Warren, Colonel Robinson was replaced in command of the Iron Brigade by Colonel Edward S. Bragg. (Note: United States War Record Office, Series 1, v. 36:3, pp. 650–651; I would like to have Colonel Bragg command the brigade of General Cutler's division at present commanded by Colonel Robinson. —G. K. Warren) Colonel Robinson resigned his commission.

== Postbellum years ==
Colonel Robinson returned to Sparta, Wisconsin, where he managed his farm for the next decade. In 1873, he went to live with his daughter and son-in-law in Chippewa Falls, Wisconsin. In 1875, President Ulysses S. Grant appointed him consul to the Merina Kingdom of Madagascar. Colonel Robinson was retained as consul by Grant's successors, Hayes, Garfield, and Arthur, and ultimately served twelve years as consul. In 1882, when a delegation of Madagascan ambassadors were being sent to tour the United States and Europe, Queen Ranavalona II personally requested that the Colonel Robinson be allowed to accompany the mission.

President Grover Cleveland did not renew Robinson's appointment, and he returned to Wisconsin in December 1886. On returning to Wisconsin, Robinson purchased a stake in the company of his son, Herbert Fisk Robinson, in the coal trade. In 1887, he attended a reunion of the Iron Brigade veterans association for the first time since his dismissal and was elected vice president of the veterans association, replacing General Edward S. Bragg. At the time, this was seen as a rebuke of Bragg, who had been extremely active in politics and was continuing to seek higher office.

In his later years, Colonel Robinson went to live with his son, William Jr., in Seattle, Washington, where the younger Robinson was serving as U.S. Army quartermaster at Fort Lawton, supplying U.S. forces in the Pacific. Colonel Robinson died at his son's home on April 27, 1903.

== Personal life and family ==
William Robinson's father, John W. Robinson, was a lieutenant in the Connecticut Militia during the War of 1812 and was severely wounded at the Battle of Stone Mill. The Robinsons were descended from John Robinson, one of the leaders of the Pilgrims in Europe, and an organizer of the Mayflower voyage. John Robinson died in Holland before he could make the trip to America, but his son Isaac was a Plymouth Colony settler—Colonel William Wallace Robinson is a descendant of this line. William Robinson's brother, Andrew N. Robinson, also resided in Wisconsin and served with the 7th Wisconsin Infantry as quartermaster, but was wounded and discharged in 1862.

William Robinson married Sarah Jane Fisk. Together they had five children, though two died in childhood. Colonel Robinson secured an appointment to the United States Military Academy for his eldest surviving son, William. William W. Robinson, Jr., went on to a 40-year career in the U.S. Army and retired as Assistant Quartermaster General of the U.S. Army with the rank of brigadier general. During his eventful career, General Robinson also served with the 7th U.S. Cavalry Regiment (after the Battle of Little Bighorn) and was with the unit sent to apprehend Sitting Bull after his surrender. General Robinson was also responsible for the donation of the family's former land in Sparta, Wisconsin, for military use. The land came to be known as Camp Robinson and is now part of Fort McCoy.

During the first winter of the Civil War, in 1861, Colonel Robinson brought his family to camp with the regiment in northern Virginia. While there, his daughter Leonora met and fell in love with a private under his command named Hollon Richardson. Robinson did not approve of their relationship, saying he did not want his daughter to become a war widow, but Richardson and Leonora defied him and eloped at Washington, D.C., in the spring of 1862. Colonel Robinson refused to speak to his son-in-law for several months after the marriage, but the two later became close friends. Richardson soon received an officer's commission, then distinguished himself during the Battle of Gettysburg, running orders between regiments and rallying the men, and received an honorary brevet to brigadier general. After the war, Colonel Robinson lived for some time with Richardson and Leonora.

== Notes ==
Military offices
| Preceded by Col. Joseph Van Dor | Command of the 7th Wisconsin Infantry Regiment; January 1862 – May 6, 1864 | Succeeded by Lt. Col. Mark Finnicum |
