= Hollon Richardson =

Union Army officer (1835–1916)

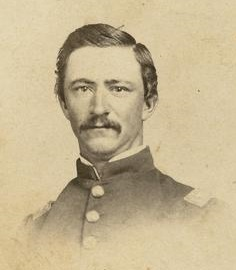
- Photograph circa 1861

District Attorney of Chippewa County, Wisconsin
- In office January 1, 1861 – August 1861
- Preceded by: A. K. Gregg
- Succeeded by: Rodman Palmer

Personal details
- Born: December 25, 1835 Poland, Ohio, U.S.
- Died: December 24, 1916 (aged 80) Keyport, Washington, U.S.
- Resting place: Mount Pleasant Cemetery, Seattle, Washington
- Party: Republican
- Spouse: Leonora Colista Robinson (m. 1862–1916)
- Children: Leonora Colista (Victor)^{(b. 1864; died 1943)}; Mary E. "Mamie" Richardson^{(b. 1866)}
- Relatives: William W. Robinson (father-in-law)

Military service
- Allegiance: United States
- Branch/service: United States Army; Union Army
- Years of service: 1861–1865 (USV); 1898 (USA)
- Rank: Lt. Colonel, USV; Brevet Brig. General, USV; Major, USA
- Commands: 7th Reg. Wis. Vol. Infantry
- Battles/wars: American Civil War; Spanish–American War

Hollon Richardson (December 25, 1835 – December 24, 1916) was an American lawyer and Union Army officer throughout the American Civil War. He served in the famous Iron Brigade of the Army of the Potomac and was awarded an honorary brevet to brigadier general after the war.

== Early life ==
Richardson was born on Christmas Day, 1835, and ultimately died on Christmas Eve, 1916. He was the eldest of nine children born to Hollon and Clarissa Richardson (née McKenzie) at Poland, Ohio. He received a common school education and read law; he was admitted to the Ohio bar in 1857, by Justice Thomas W. Bartley, with the endorsement of Jacob Dolson Cox.

The following spring, he moved to Chippewa Falls, Wisconsin, and began a legal practice. He quickly distinguished himself, and, in the 1860 general election, he was elected district attorney of Chippewa County.

== Civil war service ==
At the outbreak of the American Civil War, Richardson immediately resigned as district attorney, and set about gathering a company of volunteers from Chippewa County. He was offered a commission as captain of the company, but refused. He subsequently accepted commission as 1st lieutenant. His company became Company A of the 7th Wisconsin Infantry Regiment.

The 7th Wisconsin Infantry mustered into service August 16, 1861, and went east to Washington, D.C., for service in the eastern theater of the war.

He was promoted to captain in February 1863, and, at the time of the Battle of Gettysburg, he had been detailed from his regiment to serve on the brigade staff of General Solomon Meredith. During the first day of the battle, the Iron Brigade was one of the first two Union brigades to engage the enemy northwest of the town of Gettysburg. During the intense fighting on that first day of battle, Colonel Meredith was wounded, along with several of the other field officers of the brigade—Captain Richardson played an instrumental role in maintaining order and communication among the regiments during the critical retreat to Seminary Ridge. Richardson was effectively in command of the brigade until Colonel Robinson assumed command in the afternoon.

General Lysander Cutler, who had previously commanded the Iron Brigade, and who was in command of the brigade next to the Iron Brigade on the first day of Gettysburg, wrote a commendation for Captain Richardson:

To the Governor of Wisconsin. Sir: –

I desire to recommend to your especial consideration, Captain Hollon Richardson, of the 7th Wisconsin Volunteers. His faithfulness as an officer generally; his bravery and good judgment in the various battles in which he has been and especially on the bloody field of Gettysburg, where he manifested the utmost coolness and bravery, entitle him to the especial consideration of the Executive of the State he has so much honored. At Gettysburg he virtually commanded the brigade for a portion of the day. It cannot be known how many lives he saved by the manner in which he brought off the troops from that field on the 1st of July, when there seemed to be no one else to give orders, most of the field officers having been killed or wounded.

— Very respectfully, L. Cutler, Brigadier General

General James S. Wadsworth, who was in command of their division, also commended Captain Richardson in a letter to Governor Alexander Randall:

In the battle of Gettysburg, as the senior staff officer of the Brigade, a large and unusual amount of responsibility devolved upon him, amounting at times to the command of the brigade. His conduct on this, as on other occasions of severe trial, was in the highest degree meritorious.

Captain Richardson carried orders along the line to various regiments. As the Union line began to falter in the afternoon, Richardson picked up the colors of a Pennsylvania regiment—which had collapsed in panic—and tried to rally the men to stand together. Unfortunately, the regiment did not re-form, and Richardson ultimately withdrew, still carrying the flag.

Richardson's actions on the first day of Gettysburg were specifically mentioned in General Abner Doubleday's account of the battle in the Official War Records, Series 1, Volume 27, Part 1, Item 29.

During the evening after the first day of the battle, Richardson, moving alone between regiments, came upon a Confederate lieutenant and captured him. The lieutenant gave Richardson information about the Confederate plans for the second day of battle, and Richardson rushed to deliver the information to General Doubleday. Doubleday brought Richardson to the council of war, taking place that evening, where Richardson suggested locations for cannon placements.

Richardson was promoted to acting lieutenant colonel on August 8, 1864, and took command of the 7th Wisconsin Infantry on December 17, 1864, following the resignation of Colonel Mark Finnicum.

During the Battle of Five Forks, in the closing weeks of the war, Richardson personally saved the life of Major General Gouverneur K. Warren, and was wounded in the process. After the war, Warren offered to sponsor Richardson for a commission in the regular army, but Richardson refused.

Richardson was mustered out of the volunteers on July 3, 1865. Throughout the war, he was wounded six times and received three honorary brevets, including his final brevet to brigadier general, nominated by President Andrew Johnson on January 13, 1866, and confirmed by the United States Senate on March 12, 1866.

== Postbellum years ==
After the war, Richardson remained in Baltimore for several years, restarting his legal career there. While there, he also was selected as a delegate to the 1868 Republican National Convention, and was an enthusiastic supporter of General Ulysses S. Grant's presidential campaign. He returned to Wisconsin in 1870, and maintained a successful legal practice at Chippewa Falls for the next twenty years.

During the Spanish–American War he was commissioned as a major in the quartermasters department and served in the Philippines. He moved to the state of Washington in 1900 and established a home at Keyport, in Kitsap County. He died there after a brief illness in 1916, the day before his 81st birthday.

== Personal life and family ==
During the first winter of the Civil War, in 1861, Richardson's commanding officer, Colonel William W. Robinson, brought his family to camp with the regiment in northern Virginia. While there, Richardson befriended Robinson's daughter, Leonora, and fell in love with her. Colonel Robinson objected to their relationship, saying that he did not want his daughter to become a war widow, but Richardson and Leonora defied Colonel Robinson and eloped at Washington, D.C., in the spring of 1862.

Colonel Robinson refused to speak to his son-in-law for several months after the marriage, but the two later became close friends. After the war, Colonel Robinson came to live with Richardson and his wife.

Richardson and Leonora had two daughters, both were still living at the time of his death in 1916.

Military offices
Preceded by Col. Mark Finnicum	Command of the 7th Wisconsin Infantry Regiment; December 1864 – July 3, 1865	Regiment abolished
