= Albert O'Connor =

American Civil War Medal of Honor recipient

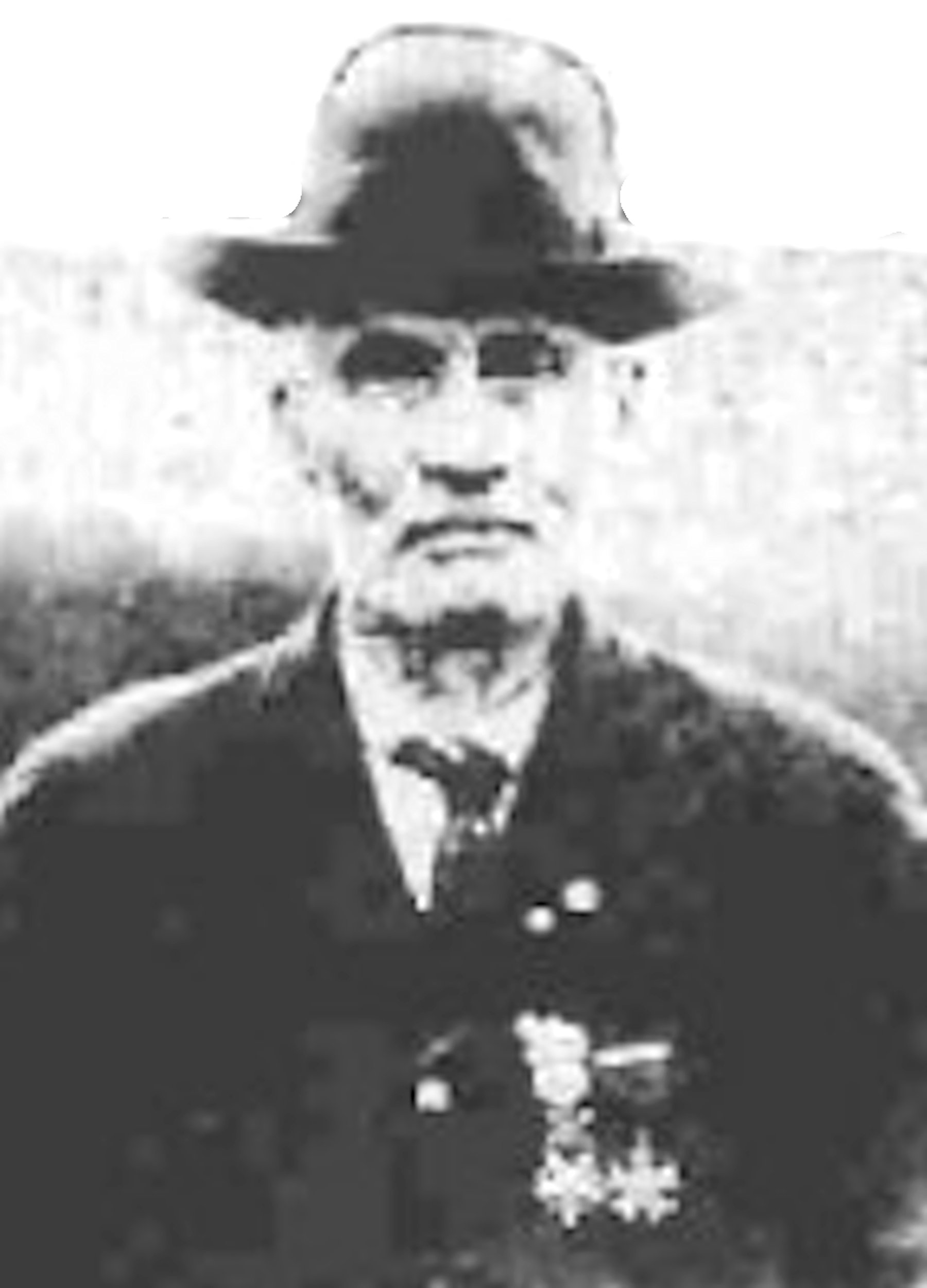
- O'Conner in 1880
- Born: July 15, 1843; East Hereford, Canada East
- Died: April 3, 1928 (aged 84); Orting, Washington
- Burial place: Washington Soldiers Home Cemetery, Orting, Washington
- Military career
- Allegiance: United States of America; Union
- Branch: United States Army; Union Army
- Service years: 1861–1865
- Rank: Sergeant; Brevet Captain
- Units: Company A, 7th Wisconsin Volunteer Infantry Regiment
- Conflicts: American Civil War
- Awards: Medal of Honor

Albert O'Connor (July 15, 1843 – April 3, 1928) served in the Union Army during the American Civil War. He received the Medal of Honor.

O'Connor was born on July 15, 1843, in East Hereford, Canada East. His official residence was listed as Lodi, Wisconsin. He joined the US Army from West Point, Wisconsin, in June 1861, and mustered out in July 1865. He died in Orting, Washington, and was buried in Washington Soldiers Home Cemetery.

== Medal of Honor citation ==
His award citation reads:

For extraordinary heroism on March 31 & 1 April 1865, while serving with Company A, 7th Wisconsin Infantry, in action at Gravelly Run, Virginia. On 31 March 1865, with a comrade, Sergeant O'Connor recaptured a Union officer from a detachment of nine Confederates, capturing three of the detachment and dispersing the remainder, and on 1 April 1865, he seized a stand of Confederate colors, killing a Confederate officer in a hand-to-hand contest over the colors and retaining the colors until surrounded by Confederates and compelled to relinquish them.

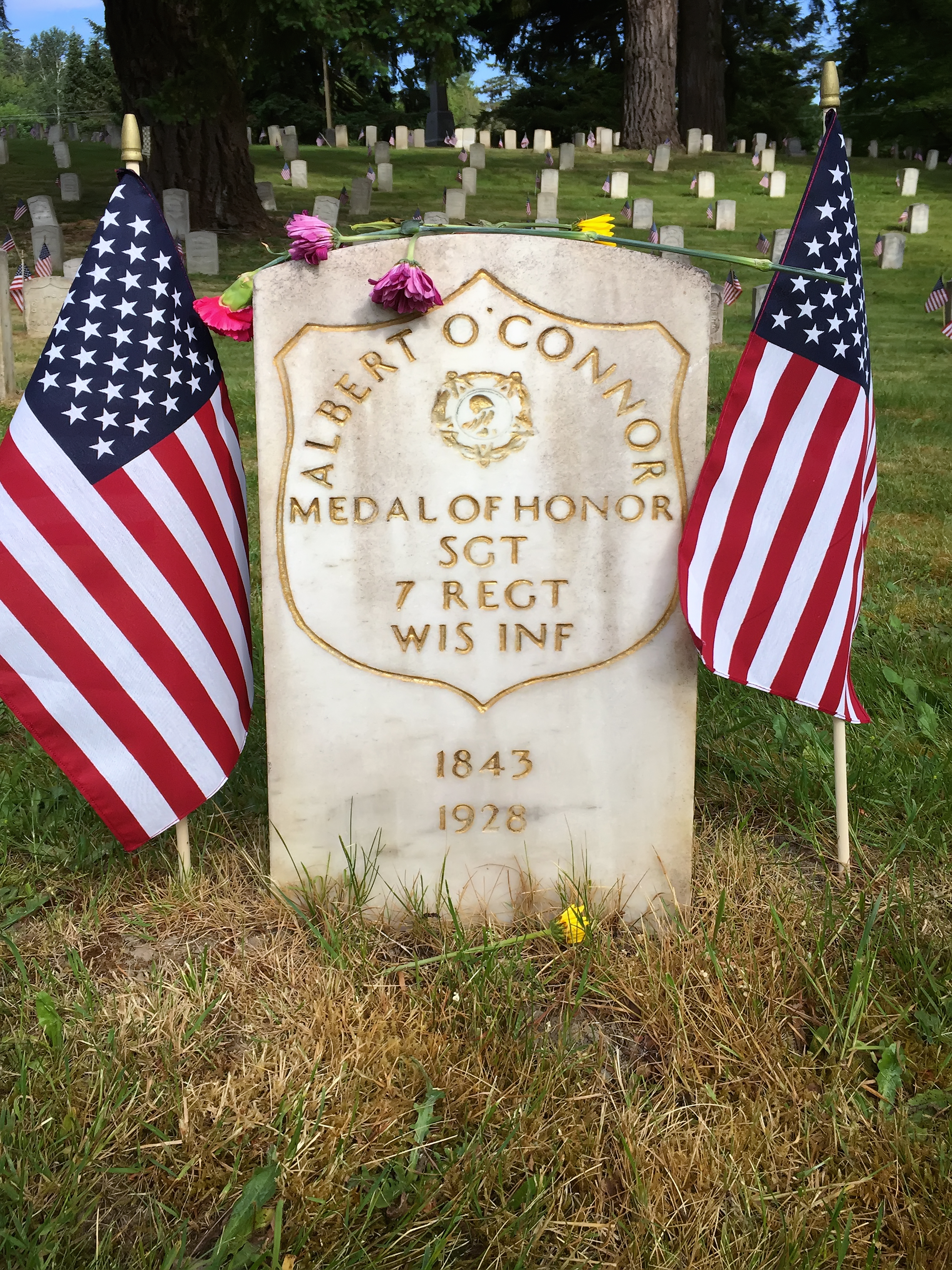
Albert O'Connor headstone at the Washington Soldiers Home Cemetery in Orting, WA

== See also ==
- List of American Civil War Medal of Honor recipients: M–P
- William Sickles
