= Peter Fagg =

American politician (1837–1917)

Peter Fagg (January 14, 1837 – December 10, 1917) was an American law enforcement officer, retail clerk, debt collector, temperance lecturer, colporteur, and politician from Milwaukee and Madison, Wisconsin, who served a single term as a member of the Wisconsin State Assembly's 2nd Milwaukee County district (the 2nd Ward of the City of Milwaukee). He was a member of the Reform Party, a short-lived coalition of Democrats, reform and Liberal Republicans, and Grangers formed in 1873 in the U.S. state of Wisconsin, which had secured the election for two years of William Robert Taylor as Governor of Wisconsin, as well as electing a number of state legislators, but failed to thrive.

== Background ==
Fagg was born Pieter Fagg in Vlissingen in the Kingdom of the Netherlands on January 14, 1837, son of Captain Johannes Gerardus Fagg (Zierikzee, 1804) and Sara Jacoba Smith (Vlissingen, 1813), and grandson of John Fagg and Jacoba Johanna van der Tollen, with John having Scotch and English ancestors. The captain was a ship owner, sailor, and merchant who owned a large grocery business in Vlissengen. His mother, Sarah Jacoba Smith, was a Vlissingen native from a prominent local family of English and Dutch ancestry. Captain Fagg never learned the Dutch language, speaking only English.

Captain Johannes Fagg died at the age of 34, and for two years his wife managed the business. She married for a second time on March 5, 1841,Frederick T. Zetteler, a son of the royal tailor. A few years after Sarah's second marriage, and after the second bankruptcy of her husband the whole family came to the United States, taking passage at Antwerp on a sailing ship that landed them at New York City. They proceeded to Albany, New York, and thence by canals and the Great Lakes to Milwaukee, landing July 3, 1848, and there they settled down on a farm. In 1853 Zetteler moved the family to Madison and opened a general store. The mother and children ran the store and the father worked for official offices of the State, including the Secretary of State of Wisconsin and the State Register of Deeds, and Peter worked in the office of former Governor Leonard J. Farwell. In 1858, a fire destroyed all of the family's property, and Zetteler returned to Milwaukee and went into the real estate business.

Peter married Tyistke (original Dutch spelling: "Tjitske") Tillema (called "Mary") on May 3, 1859. They moved to Alto in Fond du Lac County in 1861, where he worked as a retail clerk in a general store. Fagg was elected a justice of the peace in Alto, and county supervisor for the same place, in 1862, and re-elected. In 1863 his stepfather was elected (as a Democrat) to the State Assembly back in Milwaukee.

Fagg was appointed as a prison guard in the Wisconsin State Prison in 1865; then returned to Milwaukee in 1867, where he was appointed a police officer under Chief William Beck. He became a deputy sheriff under Sheriffs Parsons and McDonald, and resigned in October, 1873. He worked as a notary public and debt collector.

== Assembly ==
In 1874 he was elected to succeed fellow Reformer Joseph Hamilton (who was not a candidate) under the label of "Democratic Reform." He won with 995 votes, to 451 for Thomas Armstrong, who ran as an "Independent Republican". He was re-elected the next year as an "Independent Democrat" (the Reform Party was beginning to break down), with 763 votes to 534 for regular Democrat George Tyre, serving with his stepfather Frederick Zetteler, who had just been elected once again to the Assembly from Milwaukee as a Democrat. Due to the division of the Assembly, no single party could assemble a majority. Fagg was persuaded to support Republican Sam Fifield for Speaker of the House. Fagg switched his vote and his influence, thus enabling the Republicans to control the Assembly. From that time on, he supported the Republican party cause, especially among his fellow Dutch Americans.

Fagg was not a candidate for re-election in 1876, and was succeeded by Hamilton (now running as a Democrat).

== After the Assembly ==
Fagg became briefly postmaster of the Wisconsin State Senate, then with the help of Republican Governor William E. Smith moved on to a clerical position in the office of the Wisconsin Board of Commissioners of Public Lands, where he remained for nine years. In 1886, he was not reappointed due to his increasingly fervent religious and temperance movement positions. Fagg had been a teetotaler for many years, and increasingly argued that the only acceptable place for him in political matters was as a lecturer for the cause of Prohibition. He became a sale agent for books and Bibles. He was active in a number of fraternal orders, held high office in the Independent Order of Good Templars' Temple of Honor and Temperance and the Knights of Pythias, and for years was a member of the Independent Order of Odd Fellows.

By 1895, Fagg was reported to have suffered financial reversals, and to be working as day labor at the Wisconsin State Capitol building. He spent some time working in the library of the State Historical Society, and in the office of the Secretary of State. When he went to Milwaukee in 1896 to attend the funeral of his step-father, the Wisconsin State Journal observed, "Of the sixty-two voters in the family and connections of Peter Fagg, there is only one [D]emocrat." In 1900, he was an agent authorized to collect money for Boer soldiers wounded during the Second Boer War. (A Chicago paper had already reported Fagg as having donated to this cause, along with a number of Irish-Americans presumably doing so to "twist the lion's tail". When a bill was before the legislature to introduce primary elections as a replacement for nomination by party conventions, the Kenosha News bemoaninbg the potential diminishing effect on party conventions, asked rhetorically (quoting a Chicago Record reporter) "... where else can the Hon. Peter Fagg cut a picturesque and historical figure?"

Fagg died December 10, 1917, after a long illness and six months of blindness, leaving his invalid wife, five sons and two daughters (a third had died just three years before).
