= Christian Sarnow =

American politician

Christian Sarnow (March 25, 1837 - January 24, 1906) was a member of the Wisconsin State Assembly.

== Biography ==
Sarnow was born on March 25, 1837. During the American Civil War, he was an officer with the 1st Wisconsin Infantry Regiment (3 Months) and the 26th Wisconsin Infantry Regiment of the Union Army.

== Political career ==
Sarnow was a member of the Assembly in 1877 and 1879. Previously, he had been an alderman of Milwaukee, Wisconsin. He was a Republican.
