= 35th Wisconsin Infantry Regiment =

Union Army infantry regiment

- Flag of Wisconsin
- Active: February 27, 1864 – March 15, 1866
- Country: United States
- Allegiance: Union
- Branch: Infantry
- Size: Regiment
- Engagements: American Civil War: Mobile Campaign; Battle of Spanish Fort; Battle of Fort Blakeley (reserve)

Commanders
- Colonel: Henry Orff

The 35th Wisconsin Infantry Regiment was a volunteer infantry regiment that served in the Union Army during the American Civil War.

== Service ==
The 35th Wisconsin was organized at Milwaukee, Wisconsin, and mustered into Federal service February 27, 1864.

Ordered to Alexandria, Louisiana, on April 18, 1864. Moved to Benton Barracks, thence to New Orleans on April 26. Duty at Port Hudson until June 27, 1864. Moved to Morganza, June 27, and duty there until July 24. Moved to St. Charles, July 24, and duty there till August 6. Return to Morganza August 6–12. Expedition to Simmesport October 1–10. Moved to DeValls Bluff, October 11–18. To Brownsville November 9, and guard Memphis & Little Rock Railroad till December 12. Moved to Devall's Bluff December 12, and duty there till February 7, 1865. Moved to Algiers February 7, thence to Mobile Point, February 22. Campaign against Mobile and its defences March 17-April 12. Siege of Spanish Fort March 26-April 8. Assault on and capture of Fort Blakeley, April 9. Occupation of Mobile April 12. March to McIntosh Bluff April 13–26. Moved to Mobile May 9, and duty there till June 1. Moved to Brazos Santiago, June 1–8, thence to Clarkesville June 20, and to Brownsville August 2. Duty at Brownsville till March, 1866.

The regiment was mustered out on March 15, 1866.

== Casualties ==
The 35th Wisconsin suffered 2 enlisted men killed or fatally wounded in action and 3 officers and 271 enlisted men who died of disease, for a total of 276 fatalities.

== Notable people ==
- James Gilbert, father of Frank L. Gilbert, was a private in Co. I but died of disease before the regiment left Wisconsin.

== See also ==
- List of Wisconsin Civil War units
- Wisconsin in the American Civil War
