= Fountain Prairie, Wisconsin =

- Town
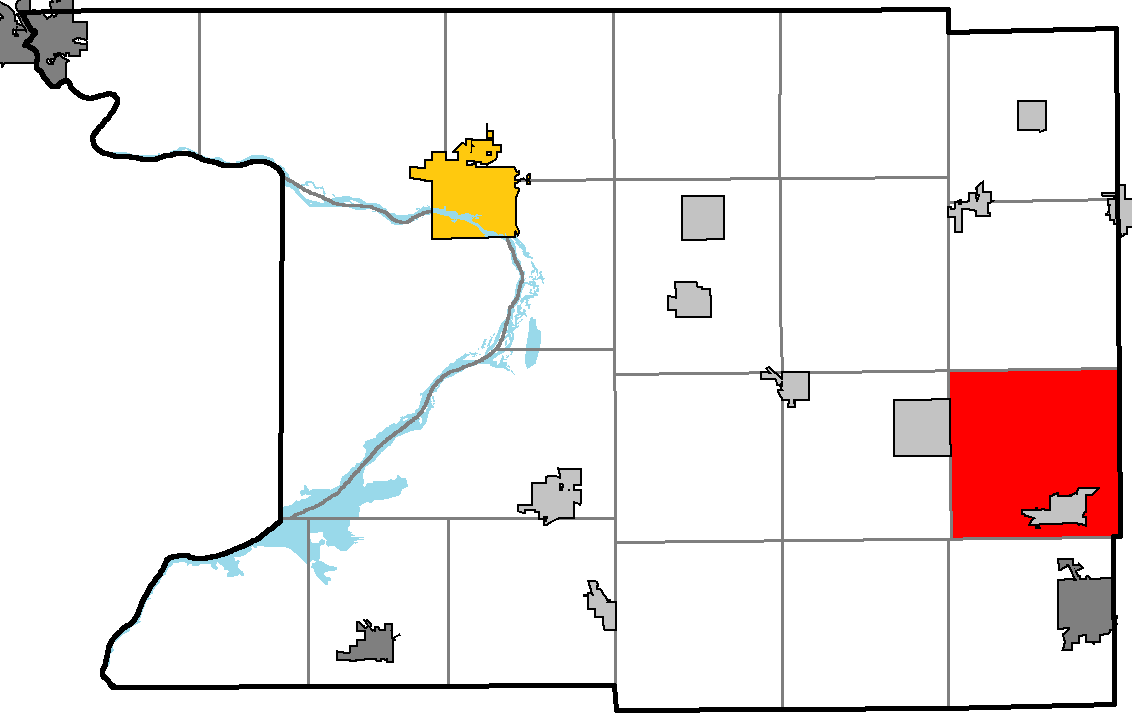
- Location of Fountain Prairie, within Columbia County, Wisconsin

- Location of Columbia County, Wisconsin
- Coordinates: 43°24′26″N 89°3′30″W
- Country: United States
- State: Wisconsin
- County: Columbia

Area
  - Total: 35.1 sq mi (90.8 km^{2})
  - Land: 35 sq mi (90 km^{2})
  - Water: 0.31 sq mi (0.8 km^{2})
- Elevation: 920 ft (280 m)

Population (2020)
  - Total: 938
  - Density: 27/sq mi (10/km^{2})
- Time zone: UTC-6 (Central (CST))
  - Summer (DST): UTC-5 (CDT)
- FIPS code: 55-26875
- GNIS feature ID: 1583224
- Website: https://tn.fountainprairie.wi.gov/

Fountain Prairie is a town in Columbia County, Wisconsin, United States. The population was 938 at the 2020 census. The unincorporated community of Englewood is located in the town. The town is approximately 35 miles (56 km) northeast of Madison.

== Geography ==
According to the United States Census Bureau, the town has a total area of 35 square miles (90.8 km^{2}), of which 34.7 square miles (90 km^{2}) is land and 0.3 square mile (0.8 km^{2}) (0.86%) is water.

== Demographics ==
As of the census of 2000, there were 810 people, 299 households, and 231 families residing in the town. The population density was 23.3 people per square mile (9/km^{2}). There were 318 housing units at an average density of 9.2 per square mile (3.5/km^{2}). The racial makeup of the town was 98.64% White, 0.12% from other races, and 1.23% from two or more races. Hispanic or Latino people of any race were 1.48% of the population.

There were 299 households, out of which 30.8% had children under the age of 18 living with them, 67.9% were married couples living together, 6% had a female householder with no husband present, and 22.7% were non-families. 16.4% of all households were made up of individuals, and 7% had someone living alone who was 65 years of age or older. The average household size was 2.71 and the average family size was 3.09.

In the town, the population was spread out, with 26.2% under the age of 18, 5.4% from 18 to 24, 30.9% from 25 to 44, 26.5% from 45 to 64, and 11% who were 65 years of age or older. The median age was 38 years. For every 100 females, there were 106.1 males. For every 100 females age 18 and over, there were 103.4 males.

The median income for a household in the town was $51,726, and the median income for a family was $58,250. Males had a median income of $35,903 versus $24,531 for females. The per capita income for the town was $21,985. About 5.7% of families and 10% of the population were below the poverty line, including 22.1% of those under age 18 and none of those age 65 or over.

== Notable people ==
- John Q. Adams, former Wisconsin State Senator and Wisconsin State Assemblyman
- Henry Charles Brace, former Wisconsin State Representative
- Martin C. Hobart, former Wisconsin State Representative
- Henry P. Hughes, former Wisconsin Supreme Court justice

== Notable buildings ==
- Nashold 20-sided Barn, round barn
