= Michael Adams (Wisconsin politician) =

American businessman and politician

Member of the Wisconsin Assembly
- In office 1872–1872
- In office 1883–1883

Personal details
- Born: October 28, 1831 Western, New York
- Died: December 24, 1903 (aged 72) Columbus, Wisconsin
- Party: Republican

Michael "Mic" Adams (October 28, 1831 – December 24, 1903) was an American businessman and politician.

Born in Western, New York, Adams moved with his parents to Jefferson County, Wisconsin Territory in 1840. They moved to Elba, Wisconsin in 1845. In 1873, Adams started an insurance and real estate business in Columbus, Wisconsin. He served in local government offices. In 1872 and 1883, Adams served in the Wisconsin State Assembly as a Republican. He died in Columbus, Wisconsin.
