= Fall River, Wisconsin =

- Village
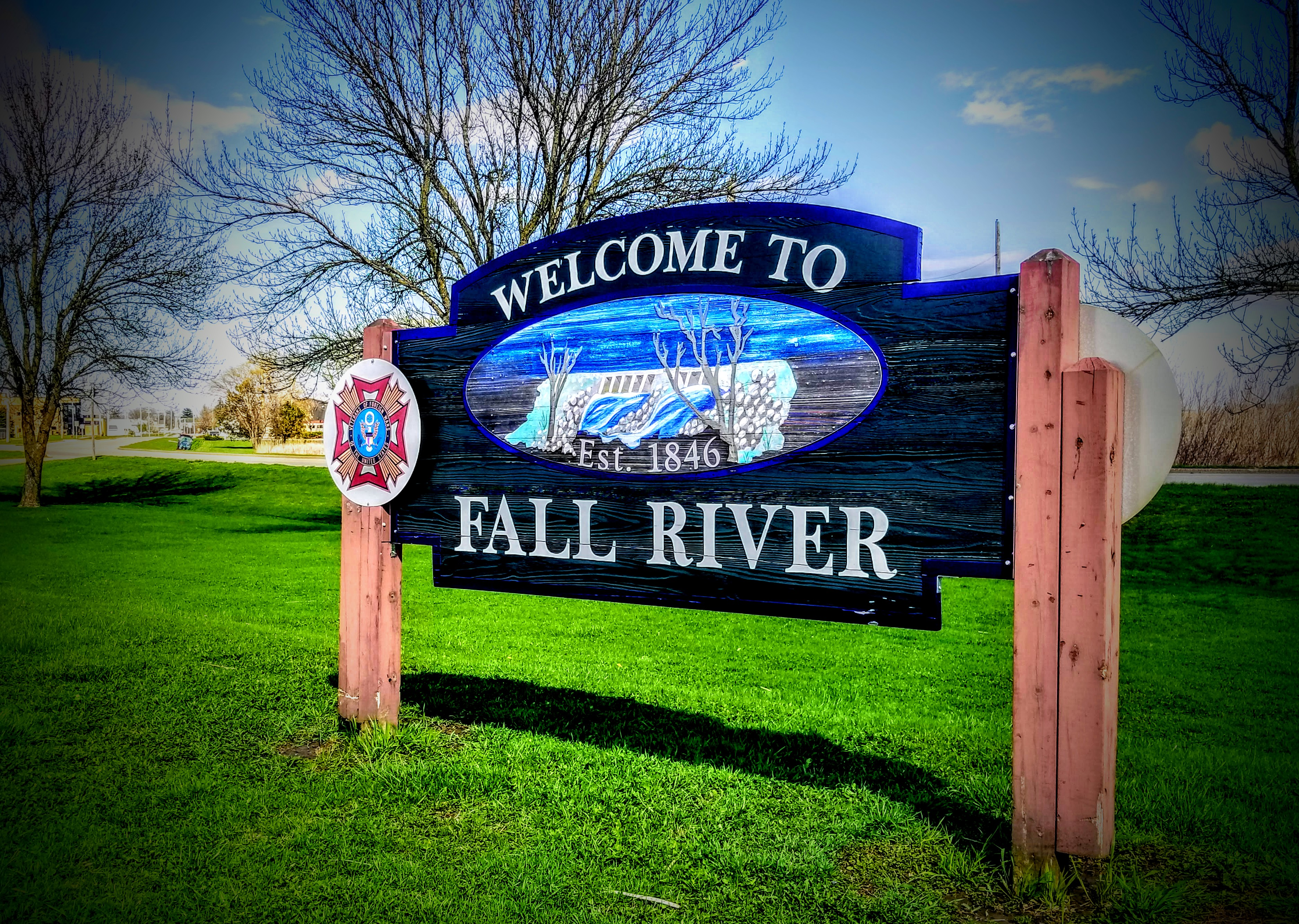
- Fall River, Wisconsin entrance sign

- Location of Fall River in Columbia County, Wisconsin.
- Coordinates: 43°23′7″N 89°2′45″W
- Country: United States
- State: Wisconsin
- County: Columbia

Area
  - Total: 1.90 sq mi (4.91 km^{2})
  - Land: 1.83 sq mi (4.74 km^{2})
  - Water: 0.066 sq mi (0.17 km^{2})
- Elevation: 856 ft (261 m)

Population (2020)
  - Total: 1,801
  - Density: 984/sq mi (380/km^{2})
- Time zone: UTC-6 (Central (CST))
  - Summer (DST): UTC-5 (CDT)
- Area code: 920
- FIPS code: 55-25150
- GNIS feature ID: 1564844
- Website: http://fallriverwi.com/

Fall River is a village in Columbia County, Wisconsin, United States, along the North Fork of the Crawfish River. The population was 1,801 at the 2020 census. It is part of the Madison Metropolitan Statistical Area.

== History ==
Alfred Brayton, an early settler, named the town after his father's family's home town of Fall River, Massachusetts.

== Geography ==
Fall River is located at 43°23′7″N 89°2′45″W (43.385346, -89.045818).

According to the United States Census Bureau, the village has a total area of 1.92 square miles (4.97 km^{2}), of which 1.86 square miles (4.82 km^{2}) of it is land and 0.06 square miles (0.16 km^{2}) is water.

== Demographics ==
Historical population
Census	Pop.	Note	%±
1850	126		—
1870	259		—
1910	360		—
1920	400		11.1%
1930	375		−6.2%
1940	425		13.3%
1950	479		12.7%
1960	584		21.9%
1970	633		8.4%
1980	850		34.3%
1990	842		−0.9%
2000	1,097		30.3%
2010	1,712		56.1%
2020	1,801		5.2%
U.S. Decennial Census

=== 2010 census ===
As of the census of 2010, there were 1,712 people, 617 households, and 461 families living in the village. The population density was 920.4 inhabitants per square mile (355.4/km^{2}). There were 671 housing units at an average density of 360.8 per square mile (139.3/km^{2}). The racial makeup of the village was 96% White, 0.7% African American, 0.1% Native American, 1% Asian, 0.4% from other races, and 1.9% from two or more races. Hispanic or Latino people of any race were 2% of the population.

There were 617 households, of which 44.4% had children under the age of 18 living with them, 54.9% were married couples living together, 12.5% had a female householder with no husband present, 7.3% had a male householder with no wife present, and 25.3% were non-families. 18.2% of all households were made up of individuals, and 4.3% had someone living alone who was 65 years of age or older. The average household size was 2.77 and the average family size was 3.14.

The median age in the village was 32.5 years. 31.1% of residents were under the age of 18; 8.6% were between the ages of 18 and 24; 31.5% were from 25 to 44; 21.6% were from 45 to 64; and 7.1% were 65 years of age or older. The gender makeup of the village was 49.3% male and 50.7% female.

=== 2000 census ===
As of the census of 2000, there were 1,097 people, 418 households, and 290 families living in the village. The population density was 756.3 people per square mile (292.1/km^{2}). There were 459 housing units at an average density of 316.5 per square mile (122.2/km^{2}). The racial makeup of the village was 98.63% White, 0.55% African American, 0.09% Native American, 0.27% Asian, and 0.46% from two or more races. Hispanic or Latino people of any race were 0.55% of the population.

There were 418 households, out of which 38% had children under the age of 18 living with them, 58.1% were married couples living together, 8.4% had a female householder with no husband present, and 30.4% were non-families. 23.2% of all households were made up of individuals, and 11% had someone living alone who was 65 years of age or older. The average household size was 2.62 and the average family size was 3.15.

In the village, the population was spread out, with 29.4% under the age of 18, 7.6% from 18 to 24, 34.4% from 25 to 44, 17.9% from 45 to 64, and 10.8% who were 65 years of age or older. The median age was 33 years. For every 100 females, there were 96.9 males. For every 100 females age 18 and over, there were 94 males.

The median income for a household in the village was $46,597, and the median income for a family was $54,271. Males had a median income of $35,739 versus $26,161 for females. The per capita income for the village was $19,257. About 4.1% of families and 5.2% of the population were below the poverty line, including 5.4% of those under age 18 and 17.4% of those age 65 or over.

== Gallery ==
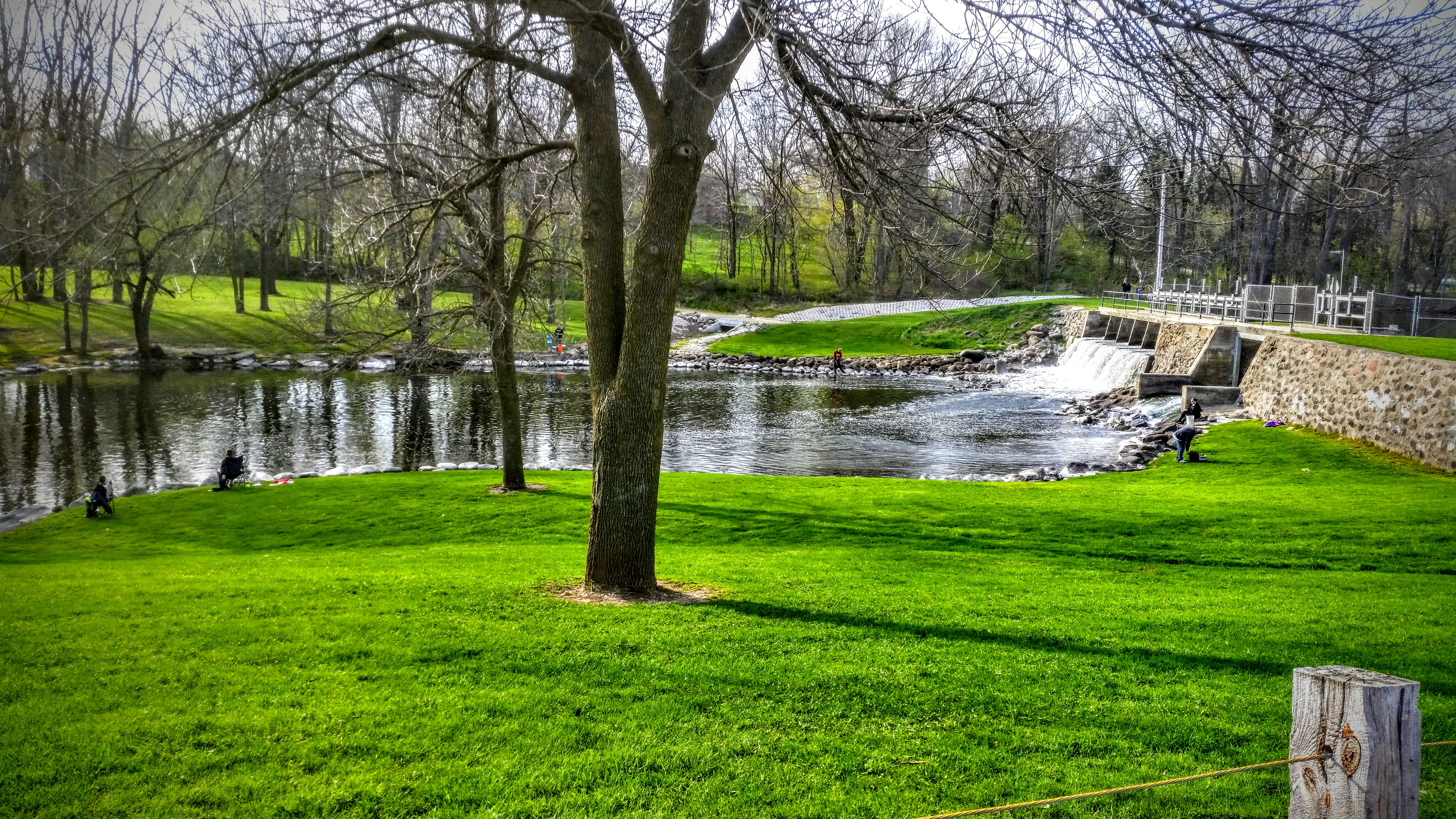

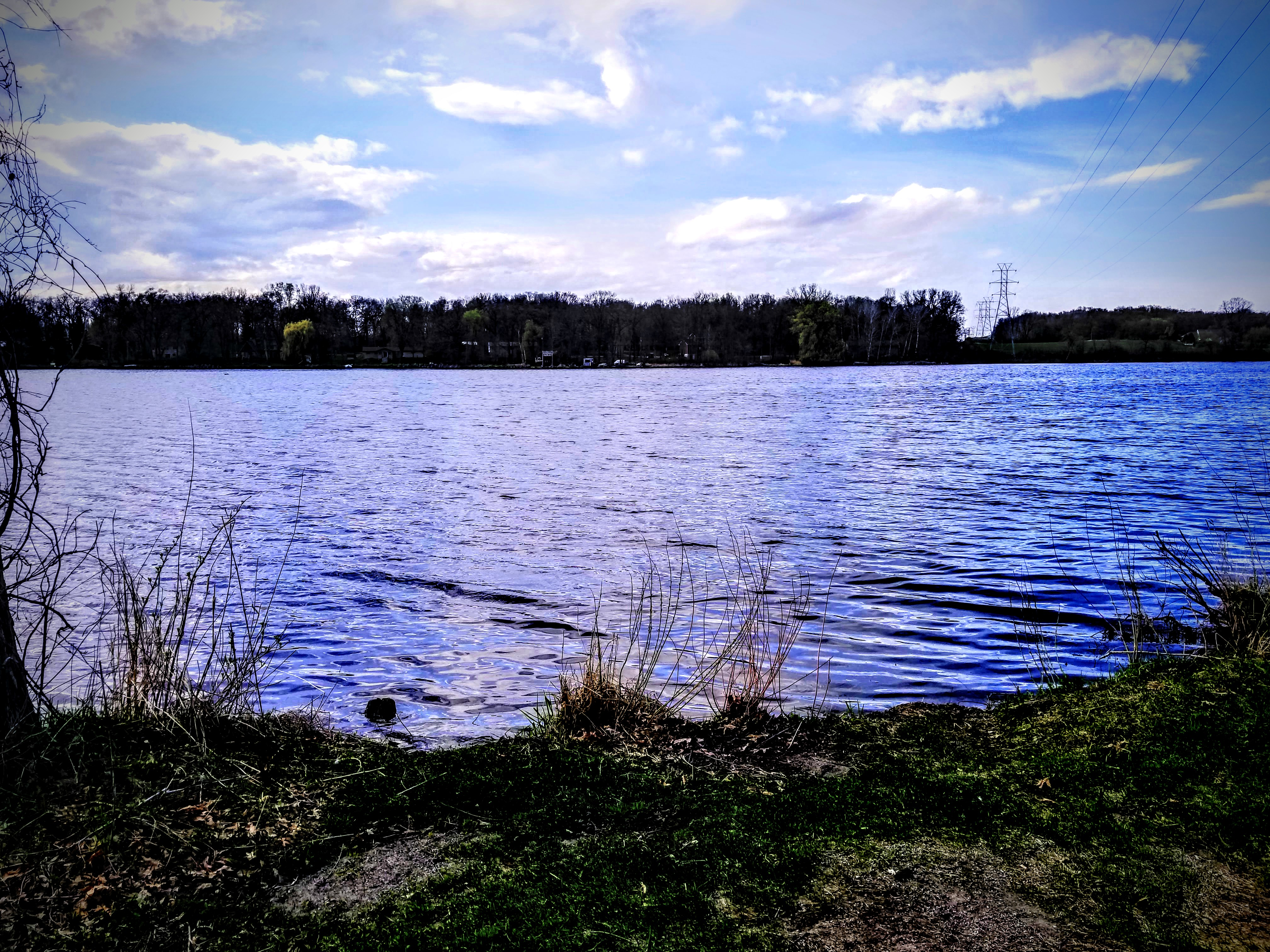

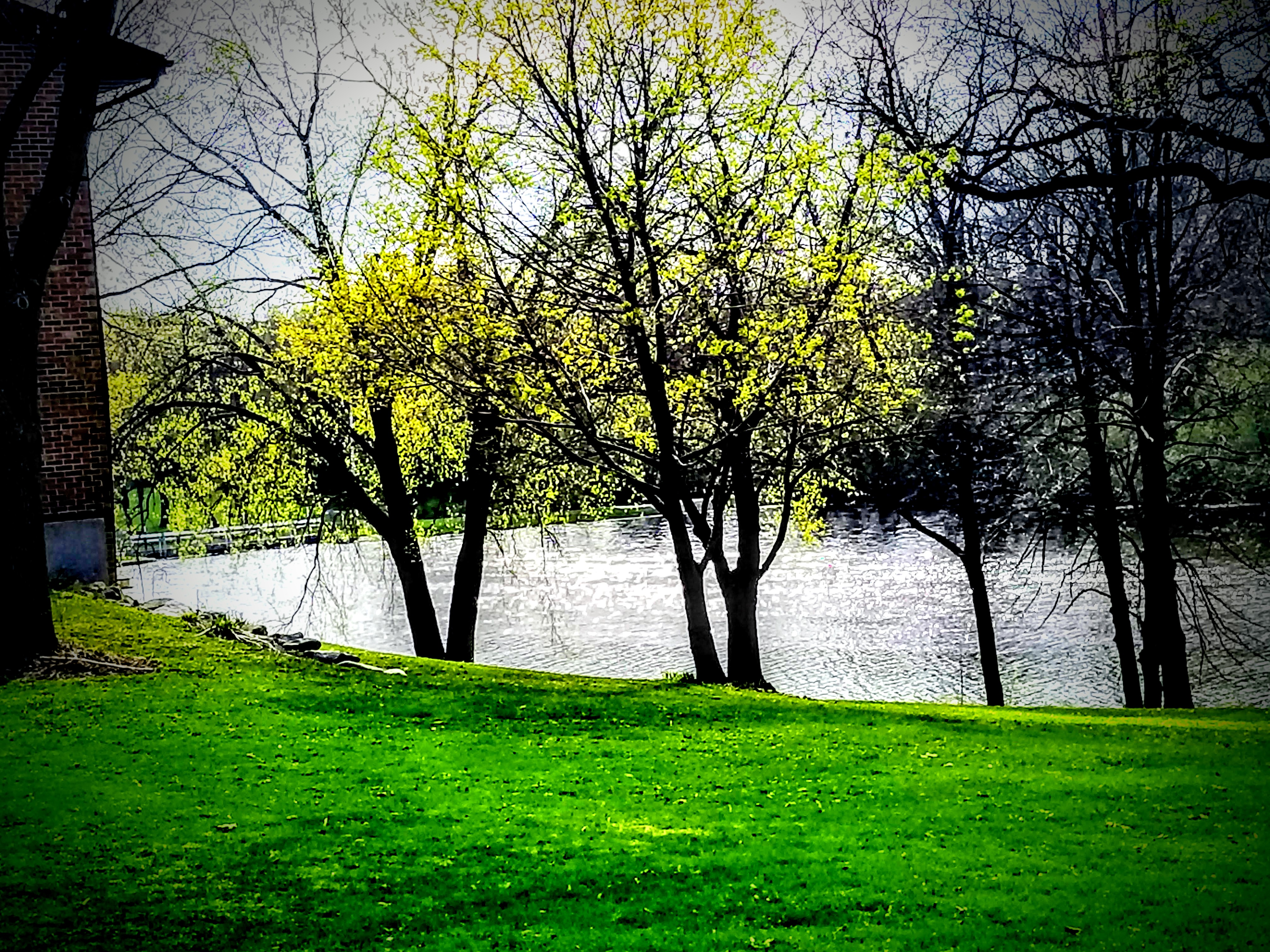

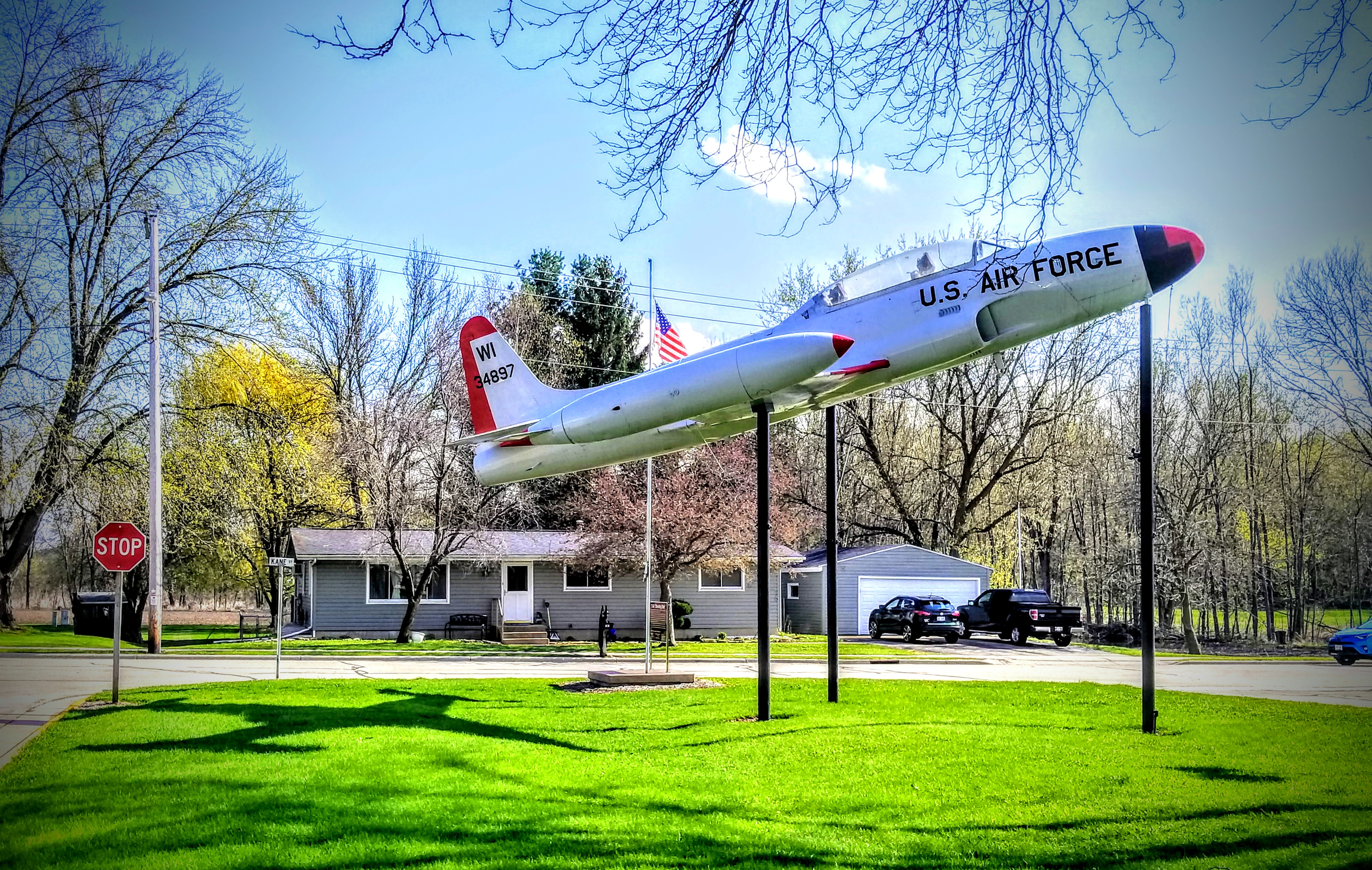

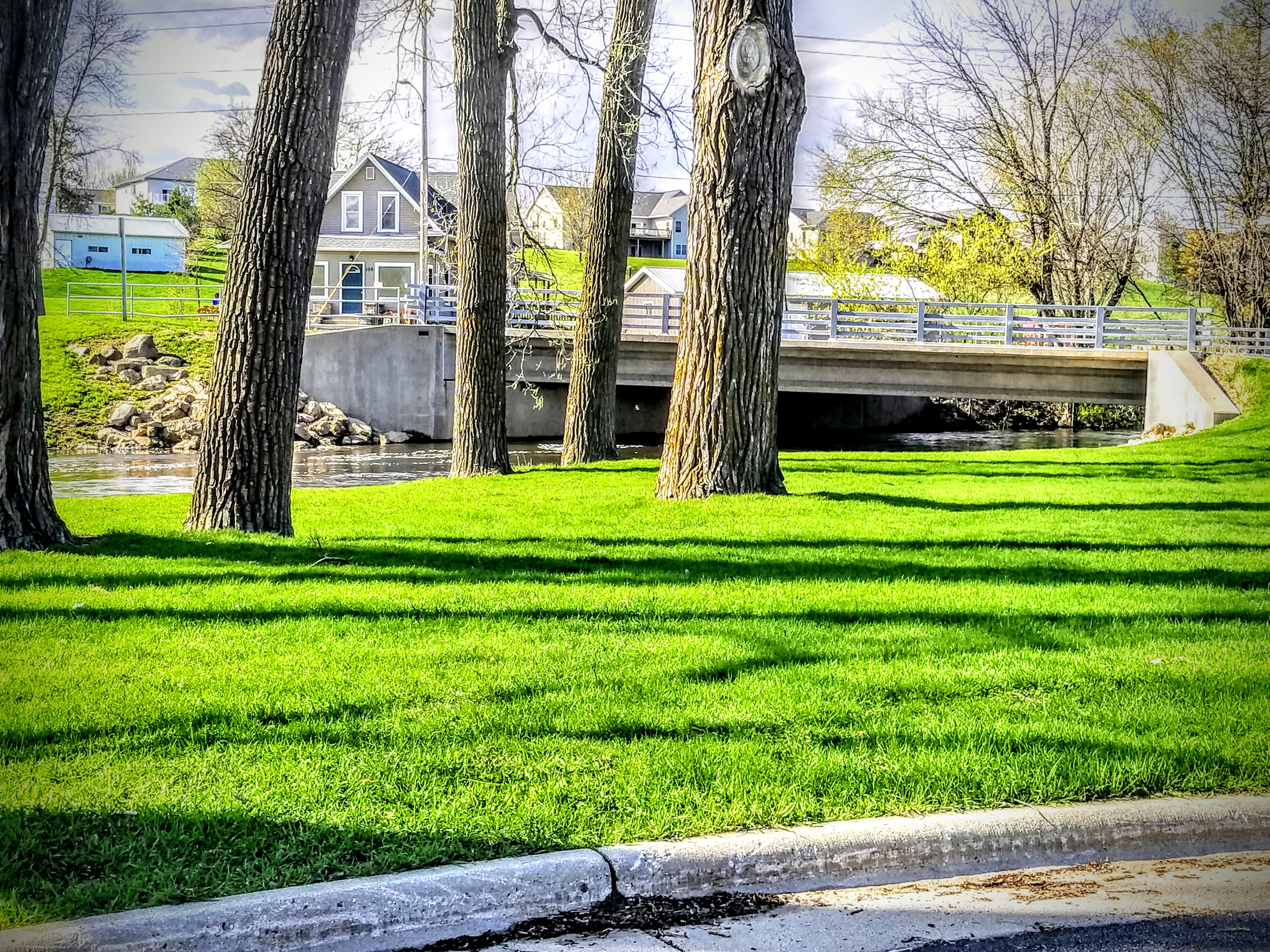

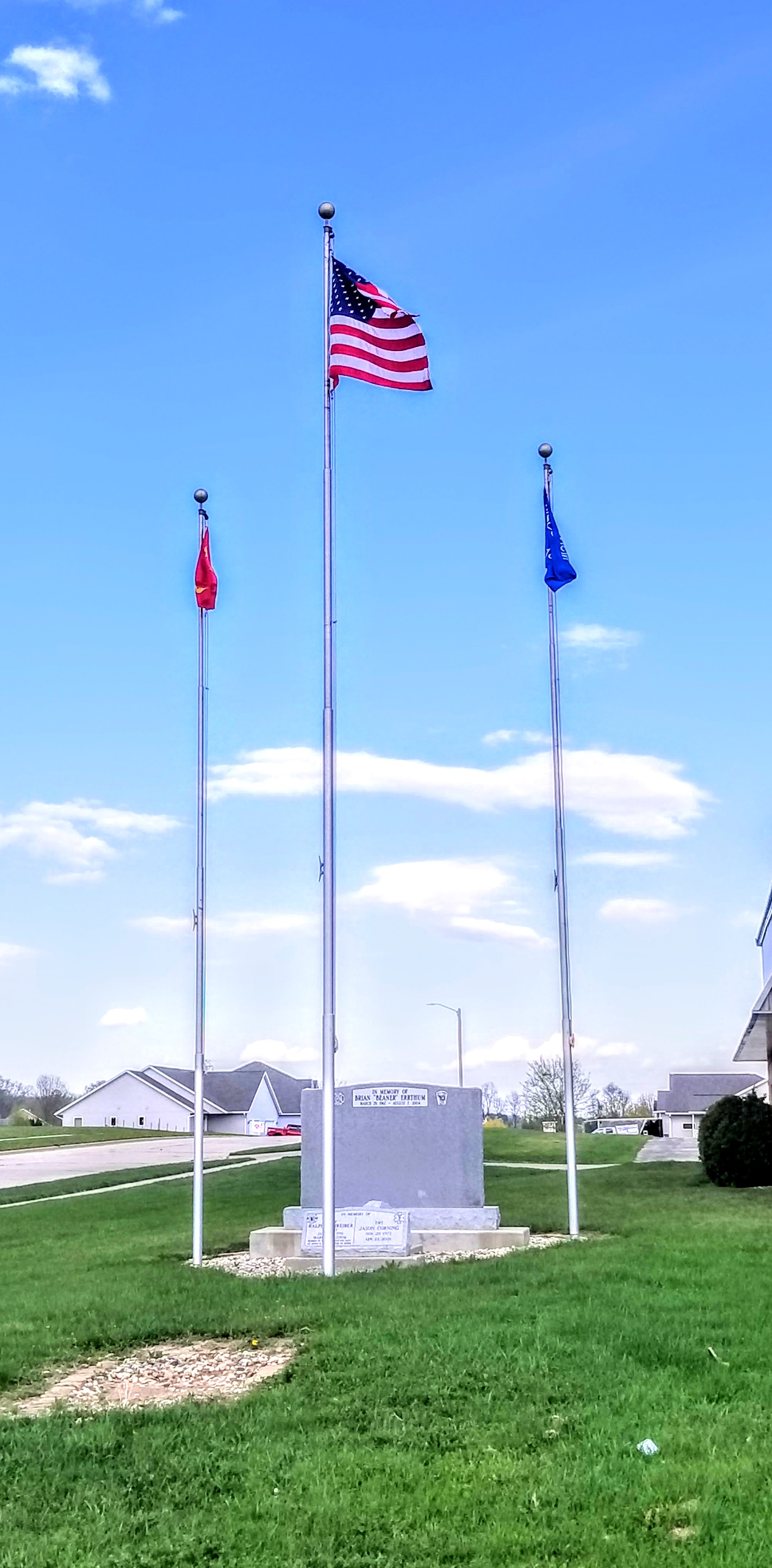

== Notable people ==
- William H. Proctor, Wisconsin state legislator and farmer; lived in Fall River
- John W. Tramburg, Born in Fall River, Wisconsin, Served as the 2nd Commissioner of the Social Security Administration (1953-1954), Director of the Department of Public Welfare in Wisconsin (1950-1953)
