= 34th Wisconsin Infantry Regiment =

Union Army infantry regiment

- Flag of Wisconsin
- Active: December 31, 1862 – September 8, 1863
- Country: United States
- Allegiance: Union
- Branch: Infantry
- Size: Regiment
- Engagements: American Civil War

Commanders
- Colonel: Fritz Anneke

The 34th Wisconsin Infantry Regiment was a conscripted infantry regiment that served in the Union Army during the American Civil War.

== Service ==
The 34th Wisconsin Infantry was composed of men drafted by state authorities under General Order No. 94. The regiment was organized at Madison, Wisconsin, and mustered into Federal service December 31, 1862.

The regiment was mustered out on September 8, 1863, in the course of disciplinary action against various members of the regiment, including the regiment commander, Fritz Anneke.

Anneke, a famous Forty-Eighter of German origin, had been a former Prussian officer and artillery commander during the 1849 revolutionary war in Palatinate and Baden, Germany. Carl Schurz, who was later a U.S. general, Secretary of the Interior, and U.S. Senator, had been his adjunct officer during that campaign, and his wife Mathilde Franziska Anneke, the famous abolitionist and feminist activist, served as ordnance officer in that campaign. Emil Anneke, the first Michigan Auditor General of the Republican Party, was his brother. Although Anneke was arrested and later dismissed from military service, he was probably innocent and a victim of denouncement and slander. Most of his friends from the German 1849 campaign served as generals in the Union, for example Carl Schurz, August Willich, Ludwig Blenker, and Franz Sigel. Fritz Anneke later tried to be re-admitted to military service, also supported by his brother Emil, but did not succeed.

== Casualties ==
The 34th Wisconsin suffered 1 officers and 18 enlisted men who died of disease, for a total of 19 fatalities.

== Commanders ==
- Colonel Fritz Anneke

== Notable people ==
- John A. Becher was quartermaster of the regiment. After the war he served as a Wisconsin state legislator and immigration commissioner.
- Denis J. F. Murphy was 2nd lieutenant of Co. B. He previously served as a sergeant in the 14th Wisconsin Infantry Regiment, where he had earned a Medal of Honor for his actions at the Second Battle of Corinth, and was wounded five times. Later he would serve as a 1st lieutenant in the 53rd Wisconsin Infantry Regiment and 51st Wisconsin Infantry Regiment.
- Marcus Trumer was a sergeant in Co. F and later served in the 35th Wisconsin Infantry Regiment. After the war he served as a Wisconsin state legislator.

== See also ==
- List of Wisconsin Civil War units
- Wisconsin in the American Civil War
