= Schadeleben =

- Stadtteil of Seeland
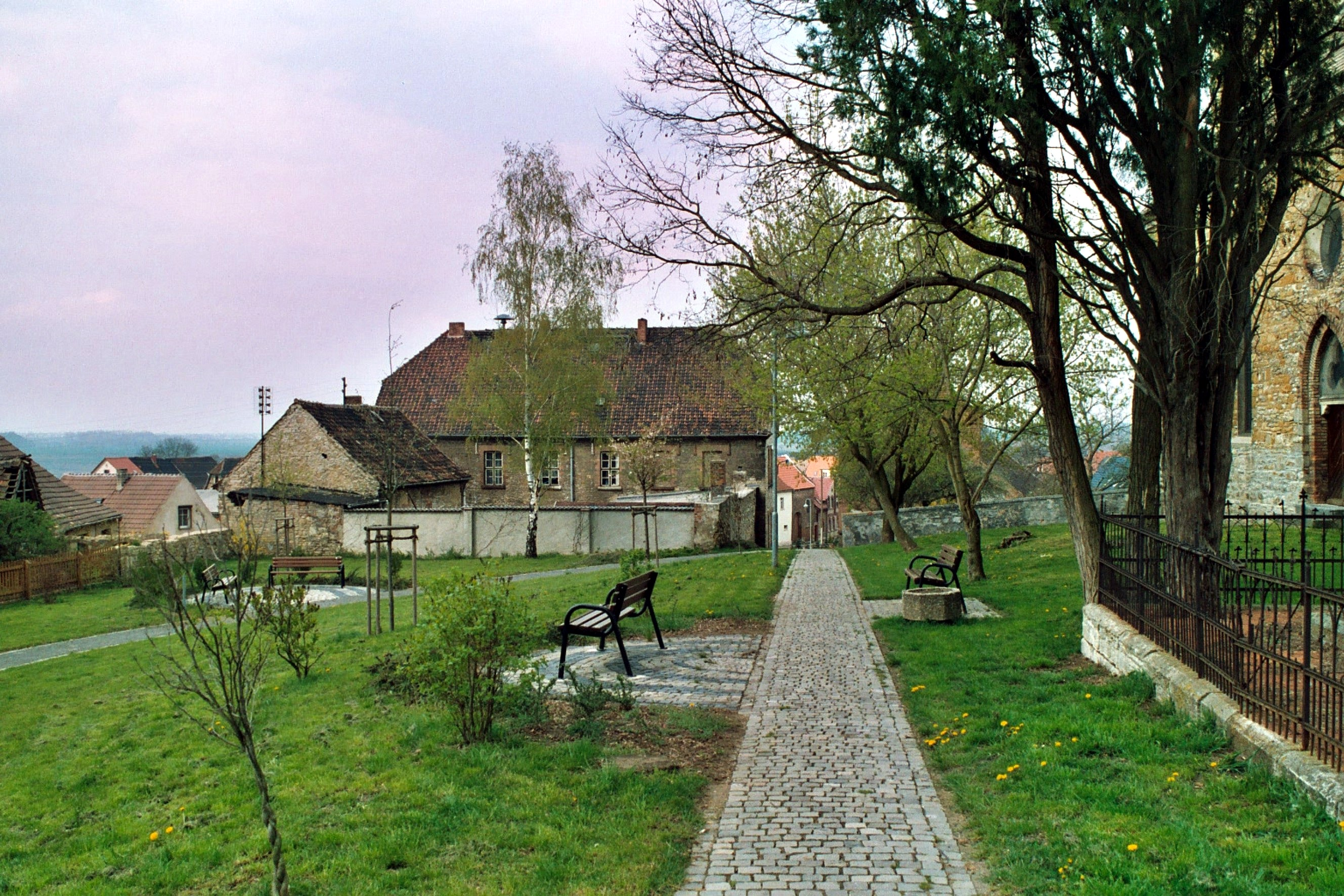

- Coat of arms
- Interactive map of Schadeleben
- Location within Germany Location within Saxony-Anhalt
- Coordinates: 51°49′N 11°22′E
- Country: Germany
- State: Saxony-Anhalt
- District: Salzlandkreis
- Town: Seeland

Area
  - Total: 16.98 km^{2} (6.56 sq mi)
- Elevation: 123 m (404 ft)

Population (2006-12-31)
  - Total: 714
  - Density: 42.0/km^{2} (109/sq mi)
- Time zone: UTC+01:00 (CET)
  - Summer (DST): UTC+02:00 (CEST)
- Postal codes: 06449
- Dialling codes: 034741
- Vehicle registration: SLK

Schadeleben is a village and a former municipality in the district of Salzlandkreis, in Saxony-Anhalt, Germany. Since 15 July 2009, it is part of the town Seeland.

Schadeleben is the place of origin of the Annecke family. There have been a number of famous family members in the United States in the 19th and 20th century.

- Fritz Anneke, German 1848er and US Colonel in the Civil War
- Emil Anneke, brother of Fritz and first Republican Michigan Auditor General
- Mathilde Franziska Anneke, wife of Fritz, 1848er, famous U.S. feminist, suffragette, anti-abolitionist, college founder, writer and publisher
