= 95th Illinois Infantry Regiment =

95th Regiment Illinois Volunteer Infantry
- Illinois flag
- Active: September 4, 1862, to August 17, 1865
- Country: United States
- Allegiance: Union
- Branch: Infantry
- Equipment: Battle of Raymond; Battle of Jackson; Battle of Champion's Hill; Battle of Big Black River; Siege of Vicksburg; Battle of Pleasant Hill; Battle of Kennesaw Mountain; Battle of Atlanta; Battle of Jonesboro

The 95th Regiment Illinois Volunteer Infantry was an infantry regiment that served in the Union Army during the American Civil War.

== Recruitment ==
The 95th Illinois was formed as a result of President Abraham Lincoln's call for 300,000 volunteers in the late summer of 1862. All ten companies were formed out of Boone and McHenry Counties and they were mustered into federal service on September 4, 1862. After spending two months training at Camp Fuller near Rockford the regiment took to the field, proceeding to Jackson by way of Cairo and Columbus. There they joined the growing army under Major General Ulysses S. Grant, who was preparing to advance on the Confederate stronghold of Vicksburg.

The 95th was assigned to the XVI Corps and took part in Grant's northern Mississippi Campaign in late 1862. This abortive first move against Vicksburg ended when the Union supply line at Holly Springs was disruption by Confederate cavalry under General Earl Van Dorn. Along with the rest of the army, the 95th retreated back into Tennessee. Reassigned to the XVII Corps under General James McPherson in January 1863, the regiment spent time in occupied Memphis before embarking down the Mississippi River to Lake Providence. There the regiment received its "baptism of fire" by skirmishing with some Confederate raiders on February 10, 1863. In early April they moved to Milliken's Bend in preparation for the beginning of the Vicksburg Campaign.

== Vicksburg Campaign ==
On April 30 the 95th Illinois participated in the crossing of the Mississippi River at Bruinsburg with the rest of McPherson's corps and spent the next two weeks marching along hot and dusty Mississippi roads. They were in the vicinity of fighting at the Battle of Raymond and the Battle of Jackson but were held in reserve. Their brigade was thrown into action at the Battle of Champion Hill but by the time they reached the front the enemy had been defeated and was fleeing back toward Vicksburg. On May 18 Grant's army reached the outskirts of Vicksburg and prepared to assault the Confederate works. The following day the Federal troops tried to storm the defenses. The 95th Illinois, part of Brigadier General Thomas E.G. Ransom's brigade of General John McArthur's division, plunged ahead and gained a point near the Confederate works. In this assault Colonel Thomas Humphrey was wounded in the foot but remained in control of the regiment and led them off the field when ordered to do so. After two days of rest, Grant decided to try again, this time sending most of his army forward against the Confederate entrenchments. Again the 95th gained the crest of a ridge that allowed them to fire down into the Confederate trenches, but they were exposed and absorbing crossfire. After a few minutes, Colonel Humphrey ordered them to retreat. Losses for the regiment in the two assaults totaled 25 killed, 124 wounded, and 10 missing.

Grant and the rest of his army settled down for the Siege of Vicksburg. They had tried to dislodge the Confederates by force and failed; now they would simply starve them out. On July 4, 1863, after nearly two months of siege, the Vicksburg defenders surrendered. After a brief rest the 95th Illinois was sent to Natchez with the rest of Ransom's brigade and occupied the city without any Confederate opposition. After spending the rest of the summer in Natchez, the regiment returned to garrison duty at Vicksburg through the fall and winter of 1863. In February 1864 they participated in the Meridian Expedition under General William T. Sherman but did not see any combat.

== Red River Campaign ==
In early March 1864, the regiment was detached from the Army of the Tennessee and joined the Department of the Gulf under General Nathaniel P. Banks. They were loaded aboard a steamboat and transported down the Mississippi River to the mouth of the Red River in Louisiana. Under their brigade commander, Colonel Lyman M. Ward, they participated in an expedition known as the Red River Campaign. On March 14 they participated in the Battle of Fort DeRussy with only a few casualties. Union commanders ordered the fort destroyed by explosives, but nobody told the 95th Illinois and other regiments that were camped nearby. When the fort exploded several members of the regiment were seriously injured and one man killed by falling debris. They continued marching into central Louisiana but did not take part in the principal engagements of the campaign, the Battle of Pleasant Hill and the Battle of Mansfield. The Red River Campaign proved to be a Union disaster and the entire force was compelled to beat a hasty retreat before the falling water level in the Red River stranded their steamboats. During this time the 95th saw action at the Battle of Yellow Bayou. They returned to Vicksburg on April 23 and then were transferred to Memphis.

== Brice's Crossroads ==
With the main Union effort in the Western Theater being concentrated against Atlanta, Union high command was worried that the Confederates under General Nathan B. Forrest would leave Mississippi and Tennessee and threaten the supply lines in Georgia. Therefore, General Sherman ordered Samuel Sturgis to lead a force of about 8,000 infantry and cavalry out of Memphis to find and distract Forrest's Cavalry Corps somewhere in northern Mississippi. The expedition, including the 95th Illinois, started from Memphis on June 1, 1864, and snaked its way into northeastern Mississippi. On June 13 General Benjamin Grierson's cavalry division made contact with Forrest's cavalry near Guntown, Mississippi. The resulting fight, known as the Battle of Brice's Crossroads was the roughest engagement the 95th Illinois ever experienced. The day was murderously hot and their brigade was rushed in to support Grierson at the double-quick, with many men falling out due to the heat. They arrived at the battlefield and almost immediately after forming into line of battle Colonel Humphrey was killed. Command devolved onto Captain William H. Stewart of Company F, but after a few minutes he was shot through both thighs. Then Captain Elliot Bush of Company G took command, but he too was killed. Finally Captain Almon Schellenger took command and held the regiment together as Confederates wrapped around both left and right flanks. The line held for about two hours but the surprising vigor of Forrest's assault was too much and the 95th Illinois, along with the rest of the Union force, fled from the battlefield. The Battle of Brice's Crossroads cost the regiment one-third of its strength in killed, wounded, and missing.

== Price's Raid ==
In August 1864 the 95th was sent to garrison duty in Arkansas spending time at St. Charles and Arkansas. In the late summer of 1864, with the presidential election approaching, Confederate general Sterling Price made a final desperate attempt to bring Missouri into the Confederacy and sway public support away from the Lincoln Administration. Price launched a raid into Missouri from central Arkansas with about 12,000 men. With the bulk of Union forces in the west concentrated in Georgia, there was some uncertainty whether the Federals could bring enough troops to oppose him and the Union high command rushed troops from all over the far west to meet this new threat. The 95th Illinois was among these forces and they rushed from south-central Arkansas into Missouri to join with a conglomeration of Union troops. This was the roughest march that the regiment ever endured. They tramped over three hundred miles in less than a month, along some of the worst roads in the country and through a desolate country with little forage and very few residents. They pursued Price's troops into central Missouri but by mid-October it was clear that this raid was not going to be successful for the Confederates. The 95th did not engage in any combat during this operation, but they did wear out their shoes.

== Battle of Nashville ==
After Price's Raid, the 95th Illinois received some much needed rest, spending time in Cairo, Illinois, attending theater productions before there was yet another emergency call for troops. The regiment was loaded up on a steamboat at Cairo and sent up the Ohio River and Cumberland River to Nashville, Tennessee. They joined General George Thomas's army to repel a Confederate offensive into Tennessee by General John Bell Hood. On December 15, 1864, the 95th advanced with the rest of the Union army against Hood's defenses south of Nashville. They were lightly engaged and the Confederate lines simply disintegrated as they advanced. The Confederates fell back to a second defensive line farther to the south and on December 16 the 95th Illinois participated in storming those lines as well, taking only one casualty. The Battle of Nashville was a complete disaster for the Confederates and what was left of Hood's Army of Tennessee fled into northern Mississippi. The 95th Illinois was part of the pursuing force that chased the Confederates as far as Eastport, Mississippi, on the Tennessee River near Corinth.

== Operations Against Mobile ==
The regiment stayed in Eastport for a month and faced sickness and starvation as freezing rain, snow, and muddy roads prevented their supply wagons from reaching them. In early February they marched to Memphis and were transferred to New Orleans in preparation for an assault on Mobile, Alabama. In March they once again loaded onto a troop transport and taken to an island off the Alabama coast for a few days where the men busied themselves with hunting oysters. On March 26 they landed near Mobile and participated in the Battle of Spanish Fort until it capitulated on April 8. The following day the 95th Illinois took part in the Battle of Fort Blakeley and were one of the first regiments to storm over the defenses. Following the fall of Mobile the 95th advanced northward into central Alabama and occupied Montgomery on April 25. On May 4 Confederate general Richard Taylor surrendered his Department of Alabama, Mississippi, and East Florida to General Edward Canby and combat operations for the 95th Illinois ceased. The regiment stayed around Montgomery on garrison duty until early July. During that time former Confederate general Beaureguard passed through their lines on his way home to Louisiana.

== Demobilization ==
In early July the 95th Illinois marched to Meridian, Mississippi and then passed through Vicksburg one final time. They loaded on a steamboat and eventually made their way to Springfield, Illinois and were mustered out at Camp Butler on August 17, 1865. Some late arriving recruits were transferred to the 47th Illinois Volunteer Infantry Regiment and were mustered out in January 1866.

== Detachment ==
Following the Red River Campaign in 1864, companies A and I were detached from the regiment and placed under command of Major Charles B. Loop. Their mission was to transport beef "on the hoof" from Tennessee to Sherman's army in Georgia. Once their mission was complete they were folded into a group of unattached companies from the 81st Illinois Volunteer Infantry Regiment and 14th Wisconsin Volunteer Infantry Regiment called "Worden's Battalion." They participated in the Battle of Kennesaw Mountain on June 27, the Battle of Pace's Ferry on July 5, the Battle of Atlanta on July 22, and the Battle of Jonesboro on August 31 and September 1. They marched north with General George Thomas's army to repulse Hood's advance into Tennessee. The detachment rejoined the main body of the regiment just prior to the Battle of Nashville.

== Total strength and casualties ==
The regiment suffered 7 officers and 77 enlisted men who were killed in action or who died of their wounds and 1 officer and 204 enlisted men who died of disease, for a total of 289 fatalities.

== Notable Members ==
- Albert Cashier, a transgender man who served in the Union Army.

== Commanders ==
- Colonel Lawrence S. Church – Resigned, January 24, 1863.
- Colonel Thomas W. Humphrey – Killed in action, June 10, 1864.
- Captain William H. Stewart – Wounded in action, June 10, 1864
- Captain Elliot Bush – Killed in action, June 10, 1864
- Captain Almon Schellenger – In temporary command at the Battle of Brice's Crossroads
- Lieutenant Colonel William Avery – In temporary command at the Battle of Nashville
- Colonel Leander Blanden – Mustered out with the regiment.

== See also ==
- List of Illinois Civil War Units
- Illinois in the American Civil War
