= Lyman M. Ward =

Union Army officer in the American Civil War

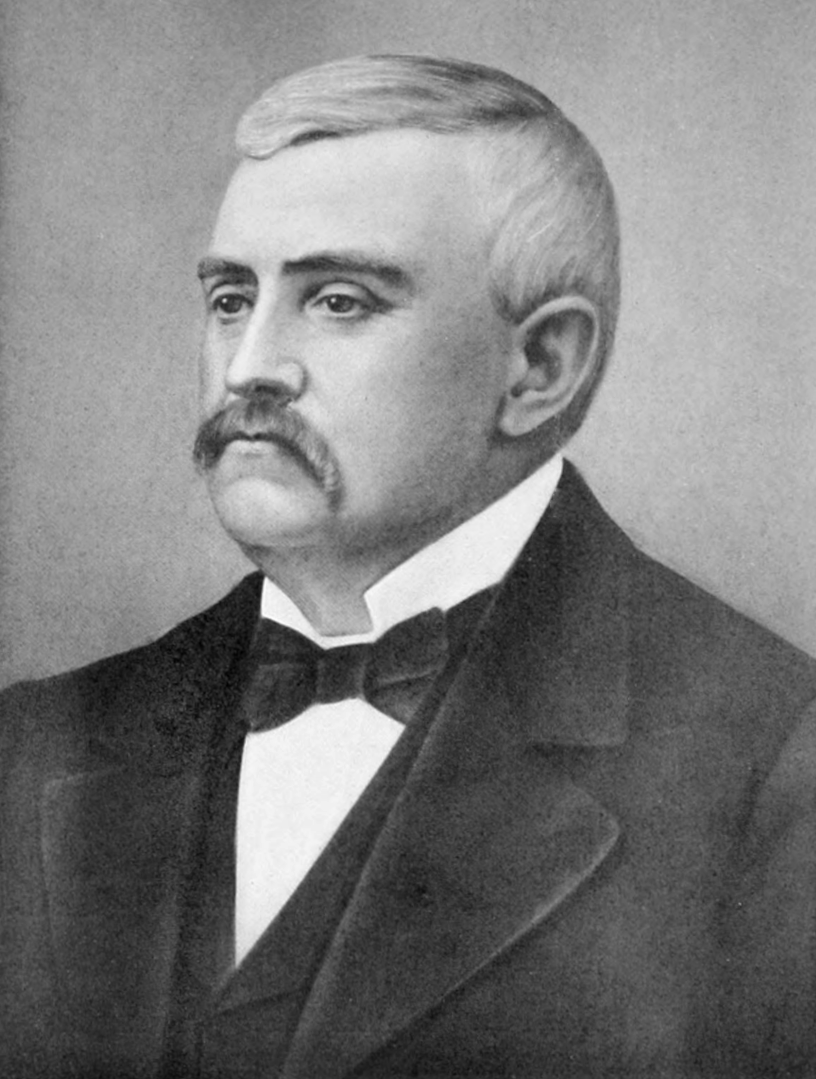

Member of the Michigan House of Representatives from the Berrien 1st district
- In office January 1, 1879 – January 1, 1883
- Preceded by: Silas Ireland
- Succeeded by: Lawrence C. Fyfe

Personal details
- Born: October 6, 1836 Cattaraugus County, New York, U.S.
- Died: January 19, 1909 (aged 72) Benton Harbor, Michigan, U.S.
- Cause of death: Heart failure
- Resting place: Crystal Springs Cemetery, Benton Harbor, Michigan
- Party: Republican
- Spouse: Ellen Louisa "Nellie" Childs (m. 1882–1909)

Military service
- Allegiance: United States
- Branch/service: United States Army; Union Army
- Years of service: 1861–1865
- Rank: Colonel, USV; Brevet Brig. General, USV
- Unit: 1st Reg. Wis. Vol. Infantry
- Commands: 14th Reg. Wis. Vol. Infantry
- Battles/wars: American Civil War; Battle of Shiloh; Battle of Iuka; Second Battle of Corinth; Vicksburg campaign; Red River campaign; Tupelo expedition; Battle of Nashville; Mobile campaign

Lyman Munson Ward (October 6, 1836 – January 19, 1909) was an American farmer, Republican politician, and Union Army colonel in the American Civil War. He served four years in the Michigan House of Representatives, and received an honorary brevet to brigadier general after his service in the war.

== Early life ==
Ward was born in Cattaraugus County, New York, on October 6, 1836, the 4th of six children born to Reverend Abel Ward and his wife Esther (née Dibble). He moved with his family to Fond du Lac, Wisconsin, in 1851. He was educated at common schools in Genesee County, New York, and attended high school and a private academy in Fond du Lac. He then went on to study law in the law offices of David E. Wood, but his studies were interrupted by the outbreak of the American Civil War. Ward had been an active member of a Wisconsin chapter of the Wide Awakes, a militant youth organization which supported the election of Abraham Lincoln and were enthusiastic for the Union cause.

== Civil War service ==
=== 1st Wisconsin Infantry (Summer 1861) ===
Ward was among the first volunteers for the Union Army, responding to President Lincoln's call for 75,000 volunteers. He was enrolled in Company I of the 1st Wisconsin Infantry Regiment, and marched to Harrisburg, Pennsylvania, in June 1861. They attached to the brigade of John Joseph Abercrombie, and engaged in skirmishing with Confederate forces under T. J. Jackson at Martinsburg, Virginia, in early July 1861. They ended their three-month service guarding canals and river crossings in the vicinity of Harpers Ferry. Ward ultimately reached the rank of first sergeant in the 1st Wisconsin Infantry.

=== Shiloh through Corinth (Spring 1862 – January 1863) ===
The regiment was ordered to return to Wisconsin to muster out at the end of their three-month commitment. But Ward immediately re-enlisted for a three-year term of service. He was commissioned captain of Company A in the 14th Wisconsin Infantry Regiment, serving under his former law tutor, David E. Wood, who was the first colonel of the new regiment.

This time, Ward and his regiment were ordered to the western theater of the war, and attached to the Army of the Tennessee, under Ulysses S. Grant. The 14th Wisconsin had not yet been organized into a brigade when the Battle of Shiloh broke out on the morning of April 6, 1862, and were waiting for orders in the vicinity of Savannah, Tennessee, about nine miles from the battlefield. That afternoon, they received orders to reinforce the Union position at Pittsburg Landing, and arrived there at about 11pm. The 14th Wisconsin was heavily engaged in fighting throughout the second day of the battle, defending a Union battery, then charging on an enemy battery, but ended up back at their original defensive position, where they were engaged for the remainder of the day. Colonel Wood and Lieutenant Colonel Isaac E. Messmore were both wounded early in the fighting, and Major John Hancock was left in command of the regiment. For their gallantry at Shiloh, the regiment received the nickname the "Wisconsin Regulars", implying they fought like professional soldiers.

Lt. Colonel Messmore resigned immediately after the battle, Hancock was promoted to lieutenant colonel, and Ward was promoted to major. The regiment remained on provost duty at Pittsburg Landing after the battle, without tents or proper provisions, and were exposed to nearly constant rain. Sickness spread in the camp, and Colonel Wood was forced to return to Wisconsin with disease. He died there on June 17. Following his death, Hancock was promoted colonel, and Ward became lieutenant colonel.

Under Hancock, the regiment remained at Pittsburg Landing for another month on guard duty, then moved to Hamburg, Tennessee, where they did similar duty until August 23. They engaged in maneuvering and skirmishing through late September associated with the Battle of Iuka and the Second Battle of Corinth. For the remainder of the year, they maneuvered with Grant's full army towards Vicksburg, Mississippi. On January 23, 1863, Colonel Hancock resigned due to illness and disability, and Lt. Colonel Ward was promoted to colonel of the 14th Wisconsin Infantry.

=== Vicksburg (1863) ===
At the start of the Vicksburg campaign, the 14th Wisconsin was attached to XVII Corps, under James B. McPherson. After months of moving down the Mississippi River, conducting reconnaissance, and seizing supplies, they arrived in the vicinity of Raymond, Mississippi, on the same day the Battle of Champion Hill occurred, May 16, 1863, but were too far away to participate. They then proceeded to the Big Black River, where they constructed two bridges, and advanced to Vicksburg. Over the next week, they assaulted the Vicksburg fortifications and skirmished with the defenders, including a costly charge on May 22 that resulted in 107 casualties among the 14th Wisconsin.

The siege continued for another 43 days until the city was surrendered on July 4, 1863. The 14th was honored by their brigade and given the advance position on entering the city, General Thomas E. G. Ransom commented that, "every man and officer of the Fourteenth was a hero." Throughout the Fall, the 14th Wisconsin assisted in consolidating control of the Vicksburg region, then camped at Vicksburg for the winter.

During the Winter, two thirds of the regiment chose to reenlist, making it the first veteran regiment in the Army of the Tennessee. In January 1864, the veterans were granted a 30-day furlough to return to Wisconsin, but due to snow storms that disrupted travel in Wisconsin, the regiment had difficulty re-assembling to return to Vicksburg. Colonel Ward was forced to return with only a portion of his command, leaving Major Asa Worden to collect the stragglers in Milwaukee.

=== Trans-Mississippi expeditions (1864) ===
Colonel Ward and his portion of the regiment returned to Vicksburg on March 6, 1864, in time to join the Red River campaign. At that time, Colonel Ward was placed in command of a brigade, composed of the 14th Wisconsin and the 81st and 95th Illinois regiments. The expedition proceeded down the Mississippi River, then up the Red River. They engaged in two months of marching and skirmishing through northern Louisiana, but ultimately retreated to Vicksburg under near-daily attack from Confederate skirmishers.

In May, Colonel Ward and his brigade were sent to Memphis, Tennessee, and joined the Tupelo expedition under General Andrew Jackson Smith. They skirmished with enemy cavalry during the march, and participated in the victory at the Battle of Tupelo, but the expedition soon had to return to Memphis due to spoiled rations.

On September 1, Ward was back in command of the 14th Wisconsin, and was sent on an expedition with three other regiments under Colonel William Graves, to reconnoiter the approach to Augusta, Arkansas. While embarked on boats along the White River, the expedition came under heavy fire and Colonel Graves was killed. Colonel Ward took command of the expedition, landed, and marched to Augusta. They found little resistance, however, as the ambushers refused to engage in battle. They returned to Brownsville, Tennessee, on September 7.

In response to Confederate General Sterling Price's cavalry raid into Missouri, the 14th Wisconsin was attached to the division of Major General Joseph A. Mower, and proceeded north into Missouri attempting to locate Price. They marched 340 miles to Cape Girardeau, Missouri, then went by ship to St. Louis and Jefferson City, Missouri, and traveled by rail to Warrensburg, Missouri, but did not encounter Price. While at Warrensburg, they received word that Price had been located and defeated elsewhere.

=== Consolidation of Mississippi and Alabama (1865) ===
They returned to St. Louis in November 1864, but soon were directed to Nashville, to assist General George Henry Thomas in the defense against a Confederate attack led by John Bell Hood. They arrived too late for the Battle of Franklin, and reached General John McArthur after the first day of the Battle of Nashville. Colonel Ward's brigade was directed to dislodge remaining Confederate forces in the vicinity of Granny White Pike. Ward's brigade moved quickly to the enemy position, receiving only scattered fire, and captured 280 prisoners. The rest of the Confederates in the area scattered.

Ward and his brigade went into pursuit of the retreating Confederate forces, but ultimately returned to Eastport, Mississippi, on January 11, 1865. The next month, they set out with the newly reconstituted XVI Corps on the campaign to capture Mobile, Alabama. Ward's brigade was now composed of the 14th Wisconsin with the 40th and 49th Missouri regiments. They disembarked on the west side of Mobile Bay and went in advance to the siege of Spanish Fort, Alabama. They were constantly engaged in sharpshooting and skirmishing throughout the Battle of Spanish Fort until the surrender and evacuation of Mobile.

Following this success, they went into camp near Montgomery, Alabama, where they remained through the dissolution of the Confederate government and the capture of Jefferson Davis. On July 19, the regiment was ordered into the city and Colonel Ward was placed in command of the post. They remained until August 27, when they returned to Mobile, where they mustered out of service on October 9, 1865.

== Post-war career ==
On January 13, 1866, President Andrew Johnson nominated Colonel Ward for a brevet to brigadier general, effective back to March 13, 1865. The United States Senate confirmed the award on March 12, 1866.

Ward briefly resided in Fond du Lac again after the war, but moved to Benton Harbor, Michigan, in 1866. He operated an orchard in Berrien County for the rest of his life. In 1878, he was elected on the Republican ticket to represent part of Berrien County in the Michigan House of Representatives, ultimately serving four years. He subsequently served as postmaster at Benton Harbor from 1888 through 1892. He remained a staunch Republican through his life, and was known to be a talented and persuasive public speaker.

He collapsed in his home on January 19, 1909, and was pronounced dead of heart failure.

== Personal life and family ==
Ward was the 4th of six children born to Reverend Abel Ward and his wife Esther (née Dibble). Reverend Ward was of English American descent, he was a Congregationalist minister in Fond du Lac from 1851 until his death in 1869.

Lyman Ward married Ms. Ellen Louisa "Nellie" Childs on July 13, 1882, at Benton Harbor. They did not have any children.

== See also ==
- List of American Civil War brevet generals (Union)

Military offices
Preceded by Col. John Hancock	Command of the 14th Wisconsin Infantry Regiment; January 23, 1863 – October 9, 1865	Regiment disbanded
Michigan House of Representatives
Preceded by Silas Ireland	Member of the Michigan House of Representatives from the Berrien 1st district January 1, 1879 – January 1, 1883	Succeeded by Lawrence C. Fyfe
