= Fitger's Brewing Company =

Brewery in Duluth, Minnesota, USA

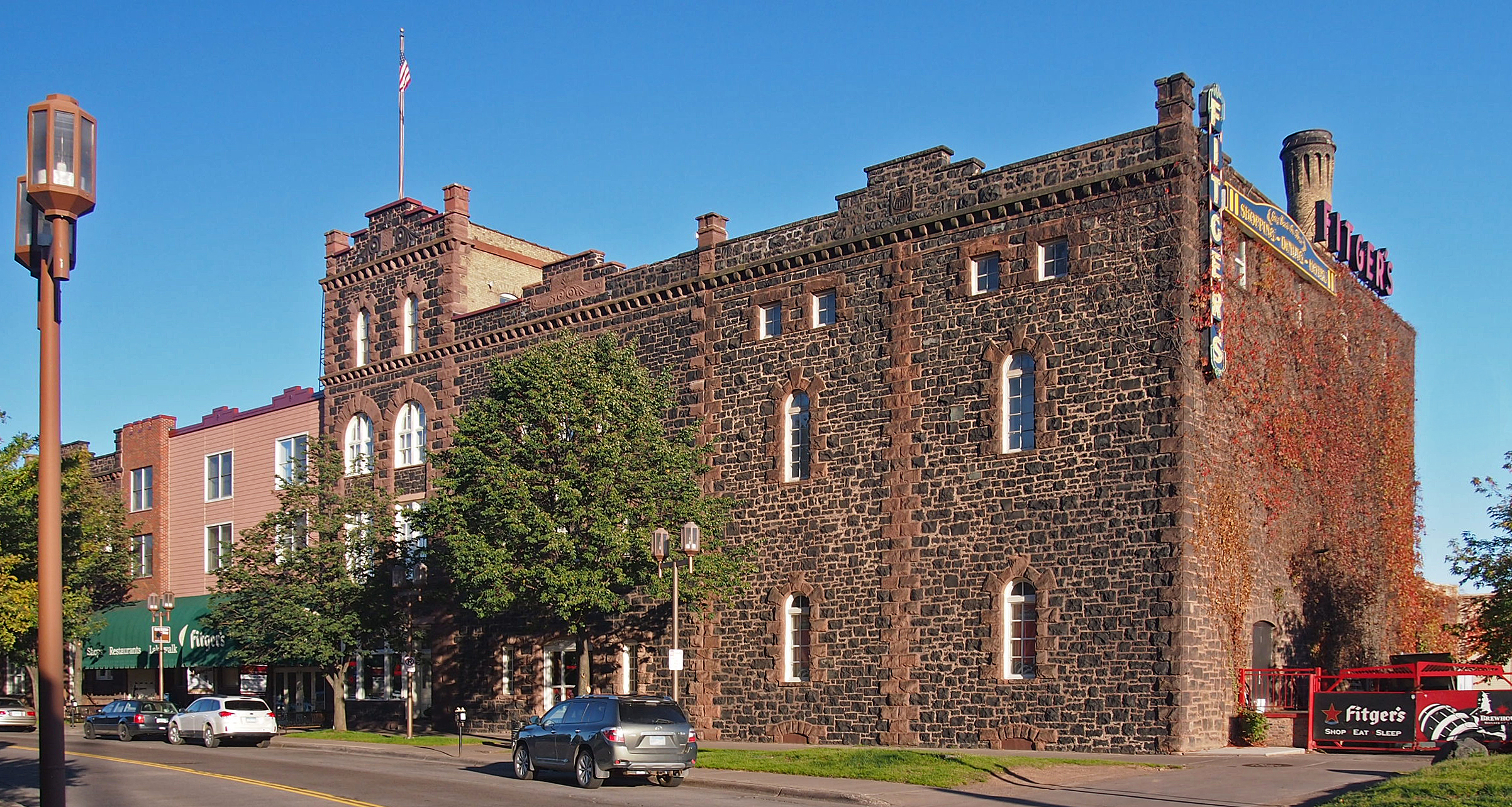
- The west end of the Fitger's Brewery complex
- Interactive map of Fitger's Brewing Company
- Location: 600 E. Superior Street, Duluth, Minnesota, United States
- Coordinates: 46°47′33″N 92°5′26″W
- Opened: 1881
- Closed: 1972
- Key people: August Fitger
- Other products: Soda, candy bars
- Fitger Brewing Company
- U.S. National Register of Historic Places
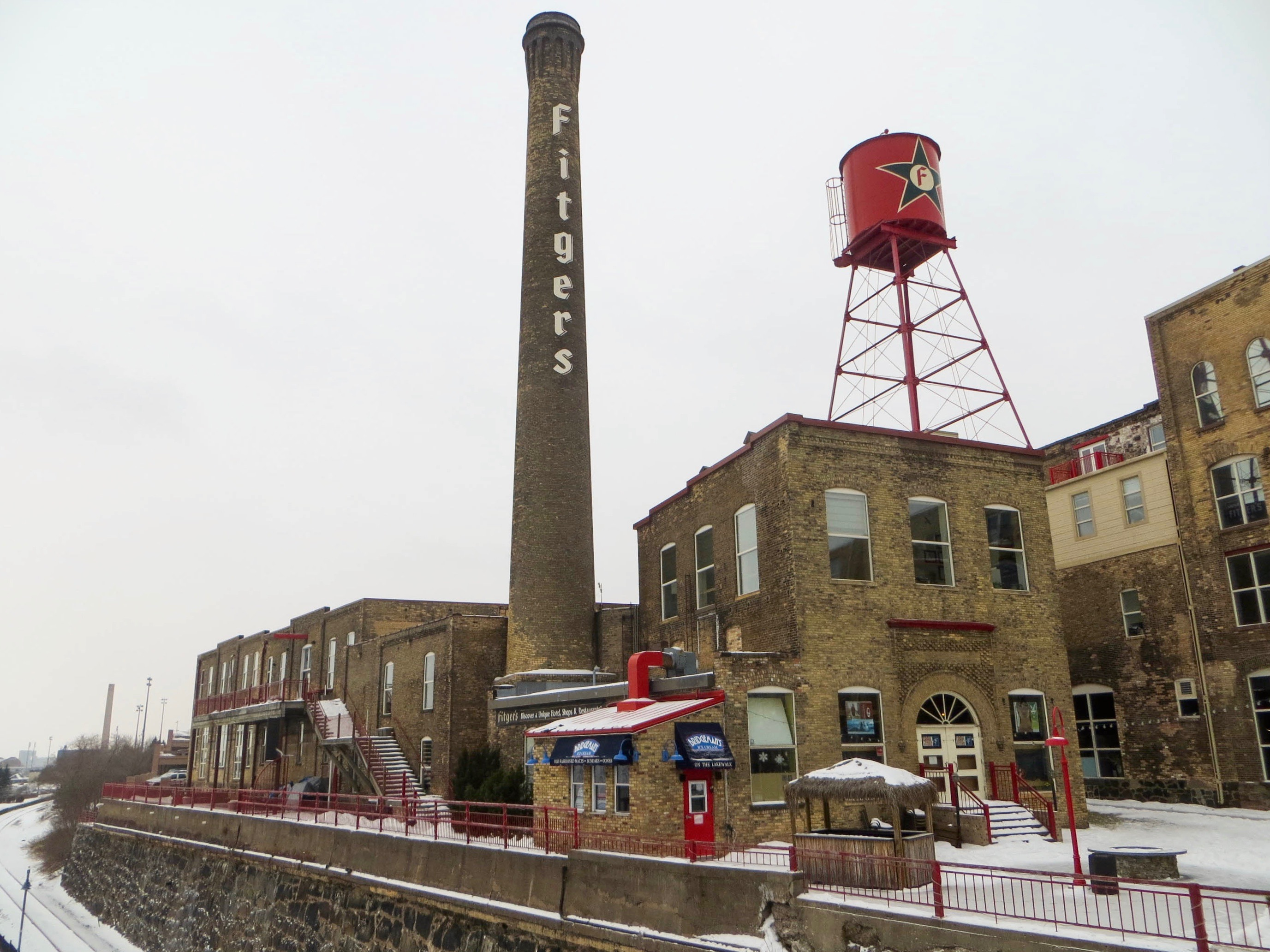
- Rear of the complex
- Area: 2.2 acres (0.89 ha)
- Built: 1886–1930
- Architect: Francis W. Fitzpatrick, Louis Lehle, Oliver G. Traphagen, et al.
- Architectural style: Utilitarian, Richardsonian Romanesque
- NRHP reference No.: 84001690
- Added to NRHP: February 9, 1984

Fitger's Brewing Company was a beer manufacturer in Duluth, Minnesota, United States, from 1881 to 1972. The surviving brewery complex stretches for 720 feet (220 m) along the Lake Superior shoreline and East Superior Street, one of Duluth's main roads. The majority of the ten-building complex was constructed between 1886 and 1911. Fitger's, as it is now known, has undergone adaptive reuse as an indoor mall with shops, restaurants, nightclubs, a hotel, and a museum on the brewery's history.

Fitger's Brewing Company grew directly out of a brewery established in 1859, making it the first commercial brewery at the head of Lake Superior and the oldest continuously operating brewery in the state of Minnesota until going out of business in 1972. Fitger's was a major local employer, producing 100,000 barrels of beer annually. It stayed open during Prohibition by diversifying into soda and candy bar production.

== Brewing history ==
=== Origins ===
A nationwide financial crisis, the Panic of 1857, had caused most of the Duluth's early pioneers to leave. A history of Duluth written in 1910 relates, "Of the handful remaining in 1859 four men were unemployed and one of those was a brewer. Capital idea; build a brewery. The absence of malt and hops and barley did not at all embarrass those stout-hearted settlers." The men rented property on a stream that emptied into Lake Superior and owned by Sidney Luce. The stream became known as Brewery Creek, as it still is today. While the original brewery "was not a pecuniary success", a few decades later it was to become the Fitger Brewing Company.

The original brewery was purchased in 1881 by Michael Fink, who decided to build a larger brewery a block and a half away and down the stream on Superior Street. Construction of the new building began on September 19, 1881, and was completed the next year. Dubbed Fink's Lake Superior Brewery, it included offices, sleeping quarters for employees, brewing facilities, and its own drinking establishment, the Brewery Saloon. Lake Superior Brewery sold its first beer in August 1882. The brewery was very successful from the beginning and sold beer as far west as Aitkin, Minnesota, and as far east as Thunder Bay, Ontario.

On November 11, 1882, Fink hired a young German brewmaster named August Fitger, a graduate from a premier German brewing school, Weihenstephan Brewing School in Munich (now part of Technical University of Munich). Just months later, in April 1883, Fitger purchased half of the company for $18,000 (equivalent to $621,964 in 2025). It was agreed that the other half would be purchased by Percy Anneke, a native of Milwaukee and auditor and sales rep for the Joseph Schlitz Brewing Company. Anneke was a friend of Fitger, and son of famous German-American political activist, abolitionist, and feminist Mathilde Anneke and her husband Colonel Fritz Anneke. The company was renamed A. Fitger & Co./ Lake Superior Brewery.

=== Prohibition ===
Beer production continued for 40 years until Prohibition began in 1920, forcing breweries to close their doors or change production. Fitger's was able to find markets other than beer to produce, and was one of the few brewers in the entire country that remained open throughout Prohibition. Fitger and Anneke sold their shares and retired to California. Percy's son Victor H. Anneke, who had taken over from his father in 1920, wanted to keep as many employees as possible, but the beer sales could not justify that. In order to keep employees, he decided to begin making soft drinks and candy and distributing cigars. Fitger and Anneke had set out a strategy several years earlier in order to keep the brewery open during Prohibition, which they only expected to last a short time. The also company produced five-cent candy bars such as The King Bee Nougat, the Flapper, the Spark Plug, the Nut Goodie, and the Skookum. Candy sales steadily increased for several years, but did not ultimately prove profitable.

Fitger's was one of the first breweries to start distributing carbonated soft drinks by the bottle under the Lovit brand. The soft drinks were made in numerous flavors that often changed. Some of the usual flavors included grape, orange, and strawberry, but they also experimented with other flavors such as imitation chocolate milk shake, black calf, black cow, ginger ale, lemon soda, strawberry fizz, and carbonated water. Their experimenting lead them to the production of champagne-like beverages such as Extra Dry and Silver Spray, both of which were immediate successes through mass amounts of advertising.

In September 1927, Anneke opened the Silver Spray Gym, a boxing gym branded after the soft drink, located at Fitger's. He converted the building that had replaced the old brewery into a boxing gym, harnessing the popularity of the sport. The Silver Spray Gym was considered high-class for its time. The main floor was a boxing arena and the basement was a training facility. Anneke believed the gym would be a benefit to the community and also good publicity for Fitger's. Many popular boxers visited the gym, including German boxing legend Max Schmeling during his first tour of the U.S. in 1928, making the facility well known.

When Prohibition was repealed in 1933, the demand for strong Fitger's beer grew. From 1933 to 1936, Fitger's experienced tremendous growth and record sales, which are attributed due to the company's continual creation of new products and innovative marketing tactics. Fitger's became one of the first U.S. companies and the first in the Midwest to offer canned beer.

=== World War II and after ===
With the onset of World War II, Fitger's once again had to fight to stay open. It became extremely difficult to get supplies to keep the brewery going. Many resources were reused because of the lack of materials. Still, Fitger's came out with new beers known as "War Beer", watered down because ingredients were scarce and labor was shorthanded. Since workers were limited because of the draft, women were brought in to work in the factory. Before Prohibition, there were more than 70 breweries in Minnesota and now only 23, with Fitger's being one of them.

In 1944, the Beerhalter family bought the brewery.

After the war, regular beer returned with ingredients and labor. Fitger's also managed to purchase brand-new equipment, and it was said that Fitger's beer was now "more pure".

In 1972, Fitger's received a letter from the State of Minnesota about two problems. The Minnesota Pollution Control Agency ordered the installation of expensive pollution abatement equipment and the Minnesota Department of Transportation planned to purchase some of Fitger's property for the possible expansion of Interstate 35. Fitger's was unable to afford the equipment, and on September 30, 1972, it closed its doors, ending 115 years of brewing on the shores of Lake Superior.

== Adaptive reuse ==
The Fitger's complex was eventually purchased by a group of prominent Duluth business owners, and reopened in December 1984. Two years later, the construction of Interstate 35 hurt business. In 1994, Fitger's-on-the-Lake LLC became the new owners of the complex.

Today Fitger's houses a brewpub, a variety of retail stores and four restaurants. There is also a museum about the brewery and a self-guided tour of parts of the historic complex.

== Description ==
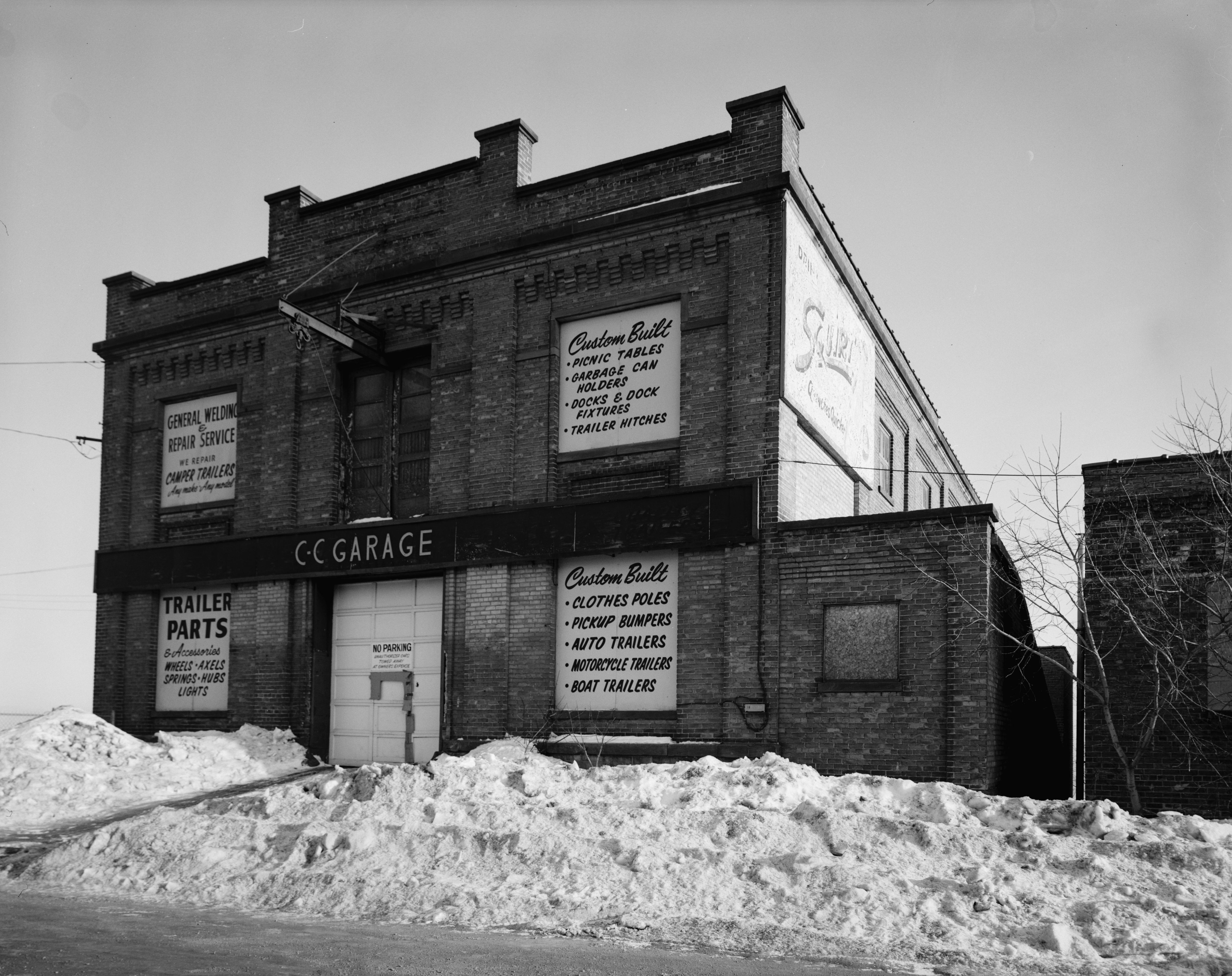
The stable and garage building in 1983

The complex comprises ten buildings, constructed and altered as needs changed over time. Most are utilitarian in design, but four buildings facing Superior Street exhibit the Richardsonian Romanesque style popular in the last two decades of the 19th century. They are characterized by their massive scale, semicircular arches, and uncoursed basalt masonry with a rusticated texture and subtle polychrome.

One of the utilitarian buildings, constructed in 1911, served as a garage and stable for the horses and vehicle used to deliver the brewery's products.

== Legacy ==
The brewery complex was listed on the National Register of Historic Places in 1984 as the Fitger Brewing Company for its local significance in the themes of architecture, commerce, and industry. It was nominated as a prominent example of late-19th and early-20th-century industrial architecture and a representative of Minnesota's important brewing industry.

== See also ==
- National Register of Historic Places listings in St. Louis County, Minnesota
- List of defunct breweries in the United States
- Ore Dock Brewing Company
