= Thomas William Humphrey =

American Union Army officer (1835-1864)

Thomas W. Humphrey
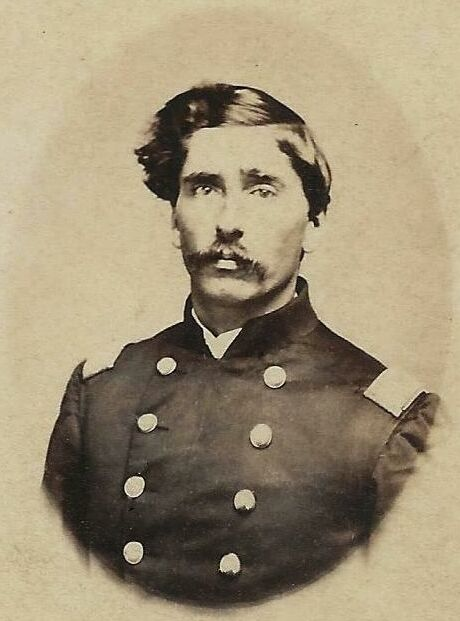
- Born: 1835; Bainbridge, New York
- Died: June 10, 1864 (aged 28–29); Battlefield of Brice's Cross Roads, near Baldwyn, Mississippi
- Military career
- Allegiance: Union
- Branch: Union Army
- Rank: Colonel, U.S.V. Brigadier general, U.S.V. (posthumous)
- Battles: American Civil War; Battle of Brice's Cross Roads †

Thomas William Humphrey (1835–1864) was an American volunteer officer in the Union Army (United States Volunteers) during the American Civil War. He was killed in action at the Battle of Brice's Cross Roads.

== Civil War ==
Thomas Humphrey, of the 90th Illinois Infantry Regiment, was among the list of wounded from Sherman's army, transferred to Nashville, Tennessee, in June 1864. He was killed in action at the Battle of Brice's Cross Roads.

== See also ==
- List of American Civil War generals (Union)
- 95th Illinois Infantry Regiment
