= 53rd Wisconsin Infantry Regiment =

Union Army infantry regiment

- Flag of Wisconsin
- Active: March 1865 – June 10, 1865
- Country: United States
- Allegiance: Union
- Branch: Infantry
- Size: Regiment
- Engagements: American Civil War

Commanders
- Lt. Colonel: Robert T. Pugh

The 53rd Wisconsin Infantry Regiment was a volunteer infantry regiment that served in the Union Army near the end of the American Civil War.

== Service ==
The regiment was organized at Madison, Wisconsin, and mustered in during April, 1865. Right away it was ordered to St. Louis, Missouri. After St. Louis, it then went to Fort Leavenworth, Kansas. On June 10, 1865, the regiment was absorbed into the 51st Wisconsin Infantry Regiment. During its service the regiment lost eight men to disease.

== Notable people ==
- Denis J. F. Murphy was 1st lieutenant of Co. D. He previously served as a sergeant in the 14th Wisconsin Infantry Regiment, where he had earned a Medal of Honor for his actions at the Second Battle of Corinth, and was wounded five times.

== See also ==
- List of Wisconsin Civil War units
- Wisconsin in the American Civil War
