= John O'Flaherty (politician) =

19th century American politician

Member of the Wisconsin State Assembly from the Brown 3rd district
- In office January 6, 1879 – January 5, 1880
- Preceded by: William Rice
- Succeeded by: Chester G. Wilcox

Personal details
- Born: June 17, 1821 Tralee, Ireland, UK
- Died: December 26, 1886 (aged 65) Morrison, Wisconsin, U.S.
- Resting place: Saint Mary Cemetery, Morrison, Wisconsin
- Party: Democratic
- Spouse: Sarah Egan (died 1895)

John O'Flaherty (June 17, 1821 – December 26, 1886) was an Irish American immigrant and farmer. He served one term in the Wisconsin State Assembly (1879), representing southern Brown County.

== Biography ==
O'Flaherty was born on June 17, 1821, in Tralee, Ireland. He later moved to Morrison, Wisconsin. He died at Stark in the town of Morrison on December 26, 1886.

== Political career ==
O'Flaherty was elected to the assembly as a representative of Brown County's 3rd district in 1878. He was a Democrat.

== Electoral history ==
=== Wisconsin Assembly (1878) ===
Wisconsin Assembly, Brown 3rd District Election, 1878
Party	Candidate	Votes	%	±%
General Election, November 5, 1878
Democratic	John O'Flaherty	477	29.91%	−25.43%
Republican	Denis J. F. Murphy	376	23.57%	+1.78%
Greenback	Patrick Ryan	391	24.51%	+1.64%
Independent	Richard W. Weyenburg	351	22.01%	
Plurality		86	5.39%	-27.07%
Total votes		1,595	100.0%	+22.41%
Democratic hold				

Wisconsin State Assembly
Preceded by William Rice	Member of the Wisconsin State Assembly from the Brown 3rd district January 6, 1879 – January 5, 1880	Succeeded by Chester G. Wilcox
