= 40th Missouri Infantry Regiment (Union) =

- 35-star United States flag (1863)
- Active: 11 Aug. 1864 – 8 Aug. 1865
- Country: United States
- Allegiance: (United States) Union; Missouri
- Branch: Union Army
- Type: Infantry
- Size: Regiment
- Engagements: American Civil War; Battle of Spring Hill (1864); Battle of Franklin (1864); Battle of Nashville (1864); Battle of Spanish Fort (1865)

Commanders
- Notable commanders: Samuel A. Holmes

40th Missouri Infantry Regiment was a infantry unit from Missouri that served in the Union Army during the latter part of the American Civil War. The regiment was organized in August and September 1864 to serve for 12 months. Beginning in November, the unit fought in the Franklin–Nashville Campaign. In March and April 1865, the regiment was part of the expedition that captured Mobile, Alabama. The soldiers were mustered out of Federal service in August 1865.

== Formation ==
The 40th Missouri Infantry Regiment organized at Benton Barracks between 8 August to 11 September 1864 to serve for one year. The field officers were Colonel Samuel A. Holmes, Lieutenant Colonel Alexander G. Hequembourg, and Major George Hoffman, with commissions to run from 8 September 1864. The captains were Adam Bax, George W. Gilson, Hermann Kallman, Daniel S. Stillinger, Monroe Harrison, Robert C. Allen, William I. Whitwell, Mosley Greene, John Ruedi, and Philip Anderson. The surgeon was Homer Judd and the chaplain was William Bradley. Captain Anderson was dismissed on 20 June 1865. Each infantry company had one captain, one first lieutenant, and one second lieutenant.

Original Company Officers, 40th Missouri Infantry Regiment
Company	Captain	To Rank From
A	Adam Bax	22 August 1864
B	George W. Gilson	25 August 1864
C	Monroe Harrison	5 September 1864
D	Philip Anderson	2 September 1864
E	Herman Kallman	22 September 1864
F	Mosley Greene	2 September 1864
G	William I. Whitwell	10 September 1864
H	Daniel S. Stillinger	3 September 1864
I	John Ruedi	7 September 1864
K	Robert C. Allen	12 September 1864

== History ==
Franklin-Nashville campaign, Nov.-Dec. 1864. Union forces in blue and Confederate forces in red.

The 40th Missouri Infantry was assigned to the District of St Louis, Department of Missouri at its formation. The regiment moved to Mexico, Missouri on 20 October 1864. The unit took part in an expedition to Paris, Missouri on 23–30 October. The regiment traveled to Paducah, Kentucky on 7–10 November, to Nashville, Tennessee on 22 November, and to Columbia, Tennessee on 26 November. From November 1864 to 14 December 1864 the regiment was assigned to the 3rd Brigade, 3rd Division, IV Corps, Army of the Cumberland. The 3rd Brigade was led by Colonel Frederick Knefler, the 3rd Division was commanded by Thomas J. Wood, and the IV Corps was led by David S. Stanley. John Schofield commanded the IV Corps and XXIII Corps at the start of the campaign.

On 22 November 1864, Federal reports confirmed that John Bell Hood's Confederate Army of Tennessee was advancing north into Tennessee from Florence, Alabama. Schofield's 22,000 infantry and 3,000 cavalry began a hurried withdrawal from Pulaski, Tennessee to Columbia. On 24 November, Schofield's troops reached Columbia just ahead of Nathan Bedford Forrest's Confederate cavalry. By the morning of 29 November, Forrest's troopers established a foothold on the north bank of the Duck River and Hood's pontoon bridge was in place. In the Battle of Spring Hill, Hood completely outmaneuvered Schofield, deploying 19,000 Confederate troops against 6,000 Federals in Schofield's rear. Convinced that he would capture the Union troops in the morning, Hood went to bed.

When Schofield finally realized the danger and retreated, the Union troops were forced to make a desperate night march past the Confederate army. As Wood's division marched, a staff officer warned about the nearby campfires, "Boys, this is a Rebel camp lying near the road, and we must march by it as quickly as possible." One Union officer riding along the road noted that Confederates could be clearly seen walking around the campfires. The 40th Missouri Infantry underwent an embarrassing experience. Typical of new recruits, the men carried too much equipment. The clatter from their cooking utensils and other gear made so much noise that the regiment drew fire from Confederate skirmishers, causing the soldiers to lie down in the road. After the firing died down, the men did not immediately get up and continue marching, so the commander of the following 13th Ohio Infantry Regiment ordered his veteran soldiers to march over the Missourians. After this humiliating episode, the men of the 40th Missouri got up and resumed the march. Afterward, Wood's veterans called them the "40th Misery".

During the Battle of Franklin on 30 November 1864, Wood's division was placed on the north bank of the Harpeth River so it missed most of the fighting. After the battle, Wood's division was the army's rearguard and withdrew at 4:00 am on 1 December. The 40th Missouri Infantry was transferred to the 1st Brigade, 3rd Division, (Detachment) Army of the Tennessee on 14 December. Colonel Lyman M. Ward led the 1st Brigade, Colonel Jonathan Baker Moore commanded the 3rd Division, and Major General Andrew Jackson Smith led the (Detachment) Army of the Tennessee. The brigade reported only three men wounded at the Battle of Nashville on 15–16 December 1864. On 16 December, Schofield asked for reinforcements and Smith sent the 3rd Division to his support. Subsequently, Smith's 1st and 2nd Divisions made the decisive assault which broke Hood's lines and captured 4,273 Confederates and 24 guns.

The 40th Missouri Infantry engaged in the pursuit of Hood's army on 17–28 December 1864. The regiment traveled to Eastport, Mississippi and remained on duty there until 3 February 1865. At that time, A. J. Smith's command was reconstituted the XVI Corps with the 40th Missouri Infantry still in the 1st Brigade, 3rd Division. The unit moved to Vicksburg, Mississippi and then New Orleans on 3–21 February. In March 1865, the regiment transferred to the 2nd Brigade, 3rd Division, XVI Corps and remained in that formation until it mustered out. The unit first sailed to Lakeport on Mobile Bay and on 3 March arrived at Dauphin Island, Alabama.

The 40th Missouri Infantry participated in the campaign against Mobile, Alabama from 17 March to 12 April 1865. The regiment was part of Ward's 2nd Brigade, Brigadier General Eugene Asa Carr's 3rd Division, A. J. Smith's XVI Corps. Edward Canby was in overall command of Union Army forces. Canby's army counted 45,000 soldiers of which 16,000 belonged to XVI Corps. Dabney H. Maury's Confederate defenders numbered only 12,000. The XVI Corps movement by water from Eastport to New Orleans to Fort Gaines, Alabama to the east side of Mobile Bay totaled 1,500 mi (2,414 km) in 49 days, of which 20 days were actual movement. The 40th Missouri Infantry took part in the siege and Battle of Spanish Fort on 26 March–8 April. By 7 April, there were 2,827 Confederates and 57 guns holding Spanish Fort. By this date, the 53 Union siege guns were causing great damage to the Confederate defensive works, while the infantry dug trenches closer and closer. On 8 April, Carr's 3rd Brigade captured a 300 yd (274 m) section of Confederate trenches; this compelled the defenders to evacuate the fort.

The Battle of Fort Blakeley was fought on 9 April. The 2nd Division of XVI Corps participated in the attack, in which 16,000 Union soldiers overran and killed or captured the 4,000 defenders. Smith tried to shift his 1st and 3rd Divisions from Spanish Fort to Fort Blakeley, but they were not needed. The 40th Missouri Infantry marched to Montgomery, Alabama on 12–25 April and performed occupation duty there until August. The soldiers were mustered out of Federal service on 8 August 1865.

== Casualties ==
During its service, 40th Missouri Infantry Regiment lost 10 enlisted men killed or mortally wounded, while 58 enlisted men died by disease. In total, 68 men died.

Union Army: 40th Missouri Infantry Regiment Casualties
Action	Officers Killed	Enlisted Killed	Officers Wounded	Enlisted Wounded	Officers Missing	Enlisted Missing
Franklin	0	0	0	1	0	0
Nashville	0	0	0	0	0	0
Spanish Fort	0	4	0	13	0	0

== See also ==
- List of Missouri Union Civil War units
- "Gilson, George W." Trans-Mississippi Theater Photo Archive. 2020. Photo shows the captain of Company B.
