= 51st Wisconsin Infantry Regiment =

Union Army infantry regiment

- Flag of Wisconsin
- Active: March 20, 1865 – August 30, 1865
- Country: United States
- Allegiance: Union
- Branch: Infantry
- Size: Regiment
- Engagements: American Civil War

Commanders
- Colonel: Leonard S. Martin

The 51st Wisconsin Infantry Regiment was a volunteer infantry regiment that served in the Union Army near the end of the American Civil War.

== Service ==
The 51st Wisconsin Infantry Regiment was organized at Milwaukee, Wisconsin, and mustered into Federal service between March 20 and April 29, 1865.

As the war was nearly over when the unit was formed, the regiment did not participate in any battles. In June 1865, by order of the Secretary of War, the 51st Wisconsin Infantry absorbed the 53rd Wisconsin Infantry Regiment (four companies).

The regiment was mustered out from August 16–August 30, 1865.

== Commanders ==
- Colonel Leonard Smith Martin (February 21, 1865 – August 26, 1865) was the son of Wisconsin founding father Morgan Lewis Martin. He was a graduate of the United States Military Academy (class of 1861) and earlier in the war served as a lieutenant in the 5th U.S. Artillery Regiment.

== Casualties ==
Sixteen enlisted men died of disease, for a total of 16 casualties sustained during the unit's history.

== Notable people ==
- Henry G. Klinefelter was 2nd lieutenant of Co. F. Earlier in the war, he served as an enlisted member of Co. D, 7th Wisconsin Infantry Regiment. After the war served as a Wisconsin state legislator.
- Denis J. F. Murphy was 1st lieutenant of Co. I after the merger with the 53rd Wisconsin Infantry. He previously served as a sergeant in the 14th Wisconsin Infantry Regiment, where he had earned a Medal of Honor for his actions at the Second Battle of Corinth, and was wounded five times.

== See also ==
- List of Wisconsin Civil War units
- Wisconsin in the American Civil War
