= Fritz Anneke =

German-American political activist, Union Army Civil War colonel, journalist

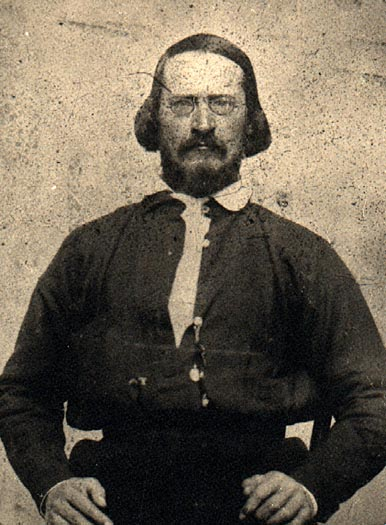
- Born: January 31, 1818; Dortmund, Westphalia, Kingdom of Prussia
- Died: December 8, 1872 (aged 54); Chicago, Illinois, U.S.
- Burial place: Forest Home Cemetery, Milwaukee, Wisconsin
- Military career
- Allegiance: Forty-Eighters; United States
- Branch: Prussian Army; United States Volunteers Union Army
- Service years: 1840s (Prussia); 1862–1863 (USV)
- Rank: Colonel, USV
- Commands: 34th Reg. Wis. Vol. Infantry
- Conflicts: German revolutions of 1848–1849; American Civil War
- Other work: Journalist, political activist

Karl Friedrich Theodor "Fritz" Anneke (January 31, 1818 – December 8, 1872) was a German revolutionary, socialist and newspaper editor. He emigrated to the United States with his family in 1849 and became a Union Army officer in the American Civil War, and later worked as an entrepreneur and journalist. He was the husband of Mathilde Franziska Anneke, the older brother of Emil Anneke, the first Republican Michigan Auditor General, and the father of Percy Shelley Anneke, well known in Duluth, Minnesota, as co-founder and owner of the famous Fitger Brewing Company.

== Life ==
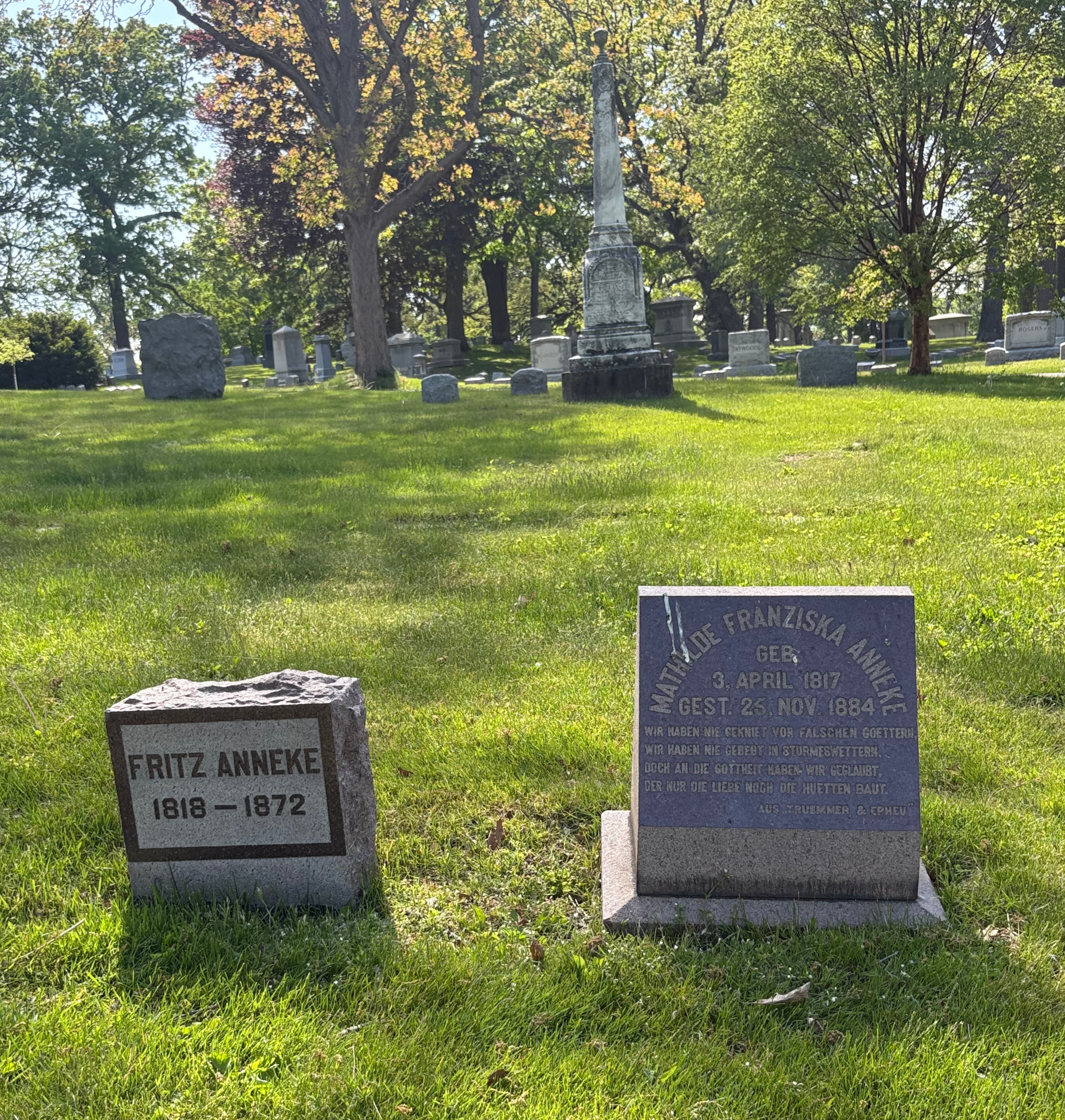
Graves of Fritz and Mathilde Franziska Anneke at Forest Home Cemetery

The Anneke family (usually spelled "Annecke"; Fritz changed the spelling of his name while still in Germany) originates from a small village called Schadeleben close to Quedlinburg in what is today Saxony-Anhalt. Schadeleben is close to the Harz mountains, one of the oldest mining regions in Europe. Like the family of Martin Luther, whose birthplace, Eisleben, is only a few kilometers away from Schadeleben, many of Anneke's ancestors had worked in mining, which is why the family moved to Dortmund in the early 19th century, when industrial coal mining was beginning in the Ruhr district. Like his father, Anneke's brother Emil was a mining inspector, before he became involved in the 1848 revolution.

Anneke became a Prussian artillery officer, but was dishonorably dismissed in 1846 because of his democratic activities at his garrison in Münster, and also because he refused a duel. While still in Münster, he met the divorced Mathilde Franziska von Tabuillot, who later became his wife. He was one of the leading figures of the Communist movement in Cologne, together with his friends Karl Marx, Friedrich Engels, and Moses Hess (later the intellectual father of Zionism and the State of Israel). He spent most of 1848 in jail for his political activities. In 1849 he joined the revolutionary campaigns in the Palatinate and Baden, and was commander of the artillery there. Carl Schurz served as his adjunct officer. After the fall of Rastatt he fled to France, where he found refuge with his wife in the house of their mutual friend Moses Hess. Later on, he worked as a correspondent for U.S. media in Europe, where he tried to join the Italian revolutionary movement under Giuseppe Garibaldi. In 1862, he returned to the US to assume command of the 34th Wisconsin Volunteer Infantry Regiment as a colonel. In 1863, he became the victim of defamation and slander and was dishonorably dismissed. His regiment was dissolved on September 9, 1863. Afterwards he tried in vain to be readmitted to Army service, supported by his brother Emil Anneke, who was a leading Republican in Michigan and acting Michigan Auditor General. Many of Anneke's friends and comrades from the 1849 campaign in Germany had become Union generals, including his own junior adjunct officer Carl Schurz, August Willich, Ludwig Blenker, Franz Sigel, and Gustav Struve.

After various failed commercial enterprises and the split with his wife Mathilde (who became an eminent figure in the U.S. abolitionist and suffrage movements, and who lived together with the American feminist and writer Mary Booth from 1860 until Booth's death in 1865), Fritz moved to Chicago, where he died on Sunday night, December 8, 1872, after an accident. The short-sighted Anneke had fallen into a construction pit. Lighting was very bad in Chicago in those days, and the city was, one year after the Great Chicago Fire, full of such pits.

He and Mathilde were buried at Forest Home Cemetery in Milwaukee.

A son of Fritz, Percy Shelley Anneke, was a local celebrity in Duluth, Minnesota, as co-founder and owner of the famous Fitger Brewing Company, which is now registered as a U.S. National Historic Place.

Military offices
Regiment established	Command of the 34th Wisconsin Infantry Regiment; December 1862 – September 9, 1863	Regiment disbanded
