= Denis Murphy (Medal of Honor) =

Union Army soldier, medal of honor recipient

Denis J. F. Murphy
- Born: June 28, 1830; County Cork, Ireland
- Died: June 19, 1901 (aged 70); Green Bay, Wisconsin, US
- Burial place: Allouez Catholic Cemetery, Allouez, Wisconsin
- Spouse: Bridget McGinnis
- Children: Johanna (Baumgart)^{(b. 1856; died 1895)}; John Murphy^{(b. 1858; died 1880)}; Mary Catherine (Daves)^{(b. 1860; died 1922)}; Constantine Murphy^{(b. 1863; died 1917)}; Katharine E. Murphy^{(b. 1865; died 1900)}; Bridget A. (Denessen)^{(b. 1866; died 1932)}; Timothy J. Murphy^{(b. 1870; died 1903)}; Patrick Francis Murphy^{(b. 1871; died 1872)}; Elizabeth Murphy^{(b. 1871; died 1872)}; Julia Helen (Hiner)^{(b. 1874; died 1947)}
- Military career
- Allegiance: United States
- Branch: United States Volunteers; Union Army
- Service years: 1861–1863; 1865
- Rank: 1st Lieutenant, USV
- Units: 14th Reg. Wis. Vol. Infantry; 34th Reg. Wis. Vol. Infantry; 53rd Reg. Wis. Vol. Infantry; 51st Reg. Wis. Vol. Infantry
- Conflicts: American Civil War
- Awards: Medal of Honor

Denis John Francis Murphy (June 28, 1830 – June 19, 1901) was an American farmer and soldier. He received the Medal of Honor for actions taken in service of the Union Army during the American Civil War.

== Biography ==
Murphy was born in County Cork, Ireland. He married Bridget McGinnis. He and his wife owned a family farm in Glenmore (De Pere), and moved into Green Bay after the war—his injuries making it no longer possible to continue farming. He died on June 19, 1901, in Green Bay. He is buried in the Murphy Family Plot (along with his wife, parents, several of his 11 children and other relatives at the Allouez Catholic Cemetery in nearby Allouez, Wisconsin. Many of Murphy's descendants still live in Brown County, Wisconsin, with many more in other parts of the United States.

== Military career ==
Murphy served in the Union Army during the American Civil War. In the Summer of 1861, he enrolled in a volunteer company from Brown County known as the "De Pere Rifles", which was mustered into service as Company F of the 14th Wisconsin Infantry Regiment. He received the Medal of Honor for his actions during the Second Battle of Corinth, where he continued carrying his regiment's colors despite being wounded three times. He was also wounded in the Battle of Shiloh and Battle of Iuka. He rose to the rank of sergeant before being discharged due to disability in November 1862.

After a brief recuperation, Murphy rejoined the war effort with a nine-month draftee regiment and was commissioned 2nd lieutenant of Company B, 34th Wisconsin Infantry Regiment. The 34th Wisconsin spent most of their brief enlistment on guard duty near Columbus, Kentucky.

Murphy had one final stint in the Union Army, when he was commissioned 1st lieutenant of Company D, 53rd Wisconsin Infantry Regiment in April 1865. Only four companies of the 53rd Wisconsin Infantry were organized, but the regiment was never officially mustered into federal service, as the bulk of Confederate forces had surrendered by this time. Nevertheless, the four companies had been dispatched to Leavenworth, Kansas. They were subsequently consolidated into the 51st Wisconsin Infantry Regiment. Murphy's Company D became Company I of the 51st Wisconsin Infantry. The 51st Wisconsin Infantry returned to Wisconsin in August and was mustered out of service.

== Postbellum years ==
Murphy was active with the Republican Party of Wisconsin in the 1870s and 1880s, and was a frequent attendee at state conventions. In 1878 and 1879 he was an unsuccessful candidate for Wisconsin State Assembly for Brown County's 3rd Assembly district (the mostly rural southern part of the county).

== Legacy ==
He was awarded a ceremonial saber with the inscription "for valor at the Battles of Shiloh and Corinth." This saber was kept and handed down by his descendants until it mysteriously disappeared into the hands of a thus-far anonymous collector (who later attempted to sell it to the Neville Public Museum) in the mid-1990s - as verified by descendant Michael Lee of Green Bay, from whose younger brother John the ceremonial saber was stolen.

The Denis J. Murphy Army Reserve in Ashwaubenon, Wisconsin, is named after him.

== Medal of Honor citation ==
His award citation reads "Although wounded three times, carried the colors throughout the conflict."

== Electoral history ==
=== Wisconsin Assembly (1878, 1879) ===
Wisconsin Assembly, Brown 3rd District Election, 1878
Party	Candidate	Votes	%	±%
General Election, November 5, 1878
Democratic	John O'Flaherty	477	29.91%	−25.43%
Republican	Denis J. F. Murphy	376	23.57%	+1.78%
Greenback	Patrick Ryan	391	24.51%	+1.64%
Independent	Richard W. Weyenburg	351	22.01%	
Plurality		86	5.39%	-27.07%
Total votes		1,595	100.0%	+22.41%
Democratic hold				

Wisconsin Assembly, Brown 3rd District Election, 1879
Party	Candidate	Votes	%	±%
General Election, November 4, 1879
Democratic	Chester G. Wilcox	922	62.26%	+32.35%
Republican	Denis J. F. Murphy	559	37.74%	+14.17%
Plurality		363	24.51%	+19.12%
Total votes		1,481	100.0%	-7.15%
Democratic hold				

== See also ==
- List of American Civil War Medal of Honor recipients: M–P
