= Emil Anneke =

German revolutionary and American journalist, lawyer, and politician

Emil Anneke (Emil Carl Friedrich Wilhelm Annecke; December 13, 1823 in Dortmund – October 27, 1888 in Bay City, Michigan, United States) was a German revolutionary as well as Forty-Eighter and American journalist, lawyer and politician (Republican Party). From 1863 until 1866, he served as Michigan Auditor General, the first Republican serving in that position. Emil was the younger brother of U.S. colonel and former German revolutionary commander Fritz Anneke, his sister-in-law was the famous German-American writer, college founder, abolitionist and suffragette Mathilde Anneke.

== Literature ==
- Michigan Historical Commission: Michigan biographies, including members of Congress [...]. Band I, Michigan Historical Commission, Lansing, 1924
- John Andrew Russell: The Germanic Influence in the Making of Michigan. University, Detroit, 1927
- Heinrich Annecke: "Die Bauernfamilie Annecke in Schadeleben und ihre Stammfolge." In: Deutsches Familienarchiv. Band 13, 1960, p. 116–140 (p. 129 briefly about Emil Carl Friedrich Wilhelm Annecke) ISSN 0012-1266

Political offices
Preceded by Langford G. Berry	Michigan Auditor General; 1863–1866	Succeeded by William Humphrey
