= Isaac E. Messmore =

19th century American politician

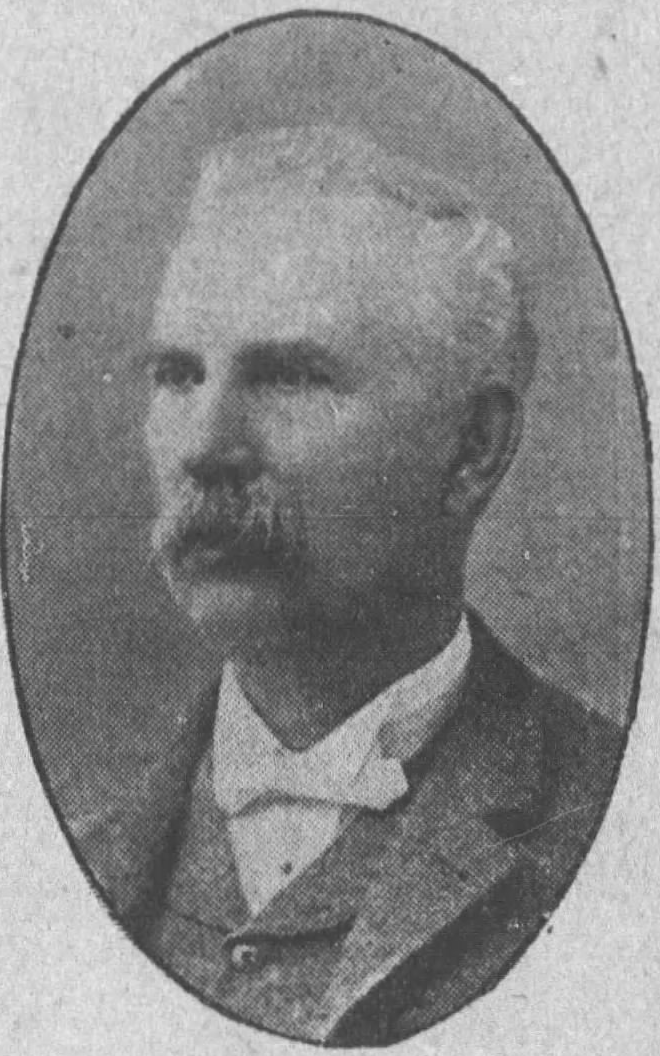
- Photograph from Los Angeles Times obituary

Wisconsin Circuit Court Judge for the 6th Circuit
- In office April 10, 1861 – August 28, 1861
- Appointed by: Alexander Randall
- Preceded by: George W. Gale
- Succeeded by: George W. Gale

Member of the Wisconsin State Assembly from the La Crosse–Monroe district
- In office January 1, 1861 – April 10, 1861
- Preceded by: John J. McKay
- Succeeded by: Thomas Benton Stoddard (La Crosse district); Joseph M. Morrow (Monroe district)

Personal details
- Born: Isaac Elijah Messmore; August 21, 1821 Upper Canada, British Empire
- Died: January 8, 1902 (aged 80) Los Angeles County, California, U.S.
- Cause of death: Pneumonia
- Resting place: Angelus-Rosedale Cemetery; Los Angeles, California
- Party: Democratic; Republican (before 1870)
- Spouses: Editha Helen McKenney; (m. 1848; died 1860); Margaret A. Hull; (m. 1861; died 1902)
- Children: with Edith McKenney; Louis Albert Messmore^{(b. 1850; died 1860)}; Florence Helen (Kendall)^{(b. 1848; died 1900)}; Charles L. Messmore^{(b. 1856; disappeared 1889)}; with Margaret Hull; John G. Messmore^{(b. 1864)}; Margaret S. (LeSage)^{(b. 1871; died 1950)}; William Sinclair Hull^{(stepson; b. 1858; died 1943)}
- Parents: John Messmore (father); Jane (Moat) Messmore (mother)
- Education: Richmond Law School
- Profession: Politician

Military service
- Allegiance: United States
- Branch/service: United States Volunteers; Union Army
- Years of service: 1861–1863
- Rank: Colonel, USV
- Unit: 14th Reg. Wis. Vol. Infantry
- Commands: 31st Reg. Wis. Vol. Infantry
- Battles/wars: American Civil War: Battle of Shiloh

Isaac Elijah Messmore (August 21, 1821 – January 8, 1902) was a Canadian American lawyer, politician, and Union Army officer in the American Civil War. He served briefly as a member of the Wisconsin State Assembly, representing La Crosse and Monroe counties during the regular session of the 1861 term. He then served several months as a Wisconsin circuit court judge until his appointment was ruled invalid in August 1861.

== Biography ==
Born in Upper Canada, near Detroit, Isaac Messmore grew up in Michigan and later studied law as a young man, graduating from the Richmond Law School in Virginia; he went on to live in La Crosse, Wisconsin, where he practiced law in the 1850s.

In 1861, he served in the Wisconsin State Assembly as a Republican. Later in 1861, he was appointed a Wisconsin circuit court judge; however, his appointment to the bench was ruled to have been improperly authorized by the governor, and thus invalid.

== Civil War service ==
After his judgeship was rescinded, Messmore chose to join the Union Army for service in the American Civil War. He helped to raise a company of volunteers from the La Crosse area, known as the "Messmore Guards". His company was enrolled as Company D in the 14th Wisconsin Infantry Regiment, and Messmore was commissioned as lieutenant colonel of the regiment on October 3, 1861, under colonel David E. Wood.

The 14th Wisconsin Infantry mustered into federal service on January 30, 1862, and went south to St. Louis in March. Shortly after arriving, they were assigned to attach to Ulysses S. Grant's Army of the Tennessee, and proceeded to Savannah, Tennessee. Shortly after they arrived, on the morning of April 6, Confederate forces attacked Union troop concentrations just south of Savannah, beginning what would be known as the Battle of Shiloh.

The 14th Wisconsin was assigned to provost duty at Savannah, so was not intended to join the battle, and was not organized into a brigade or division for combat purposes. At about 4pm on the first day of fighting—after Union forces had been driven back for most of the day—an aide to General Charles Ferguson Smith informed Colonel Wood that a division of Union reinforcements under General Thomas Leonidas Crittenden would be arriving that evening at Pittsburg Landing, and were hoping to add one or two more regiments before proceeding to the front. Wood replied that the 14th Wisconsin was willing to fight, and an hour later they loaded into boats to proceed south upstream to Pittsburg Landing. Although Messmore had just put in his resignation a few days earlier, the paperwork was not finalized, so Messmore chose to remain with the regiment as it entered the battle. They arrived late that night, then marched in near complete darkness over fields of wounded and dead men, and were attached to the brigade under command of Colonel William Sooy Smith.

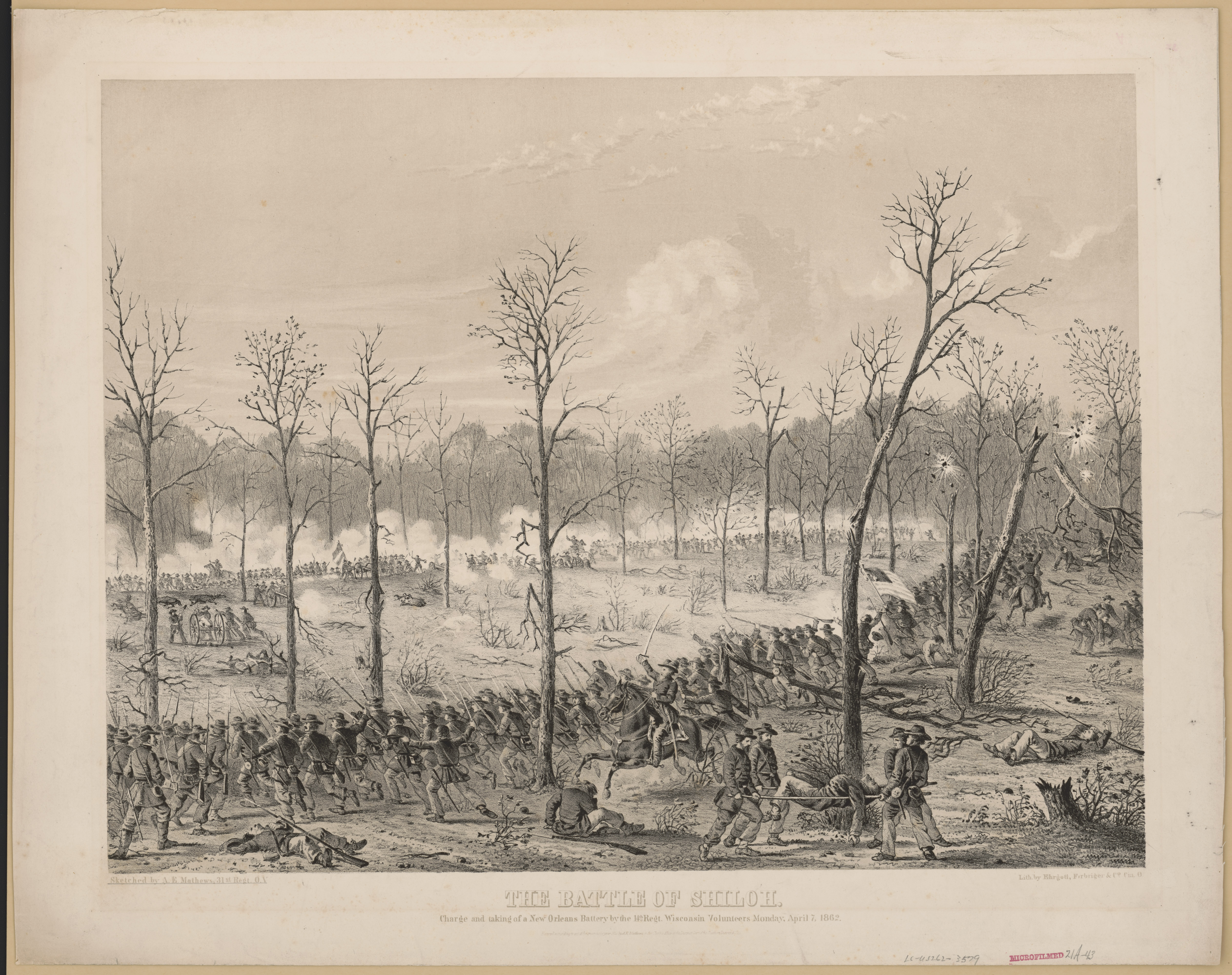
The charge of the 14th Wisconsin Volunteers, capturing the New Orleans Battery at the Battle of Shiloh. Messmore depicted in the center, riding the horse.

The following morning, the battle resumed with Confederate forces attacking again. The 14th Wisconsin were ordered to charge the enemy with fixed bayonets, driving the rebels back. In the melee, Colonel Smith rode up alongside Lt. Col. Messmore and asked him if the Wisconsin regiment could take an enemy (New Orleans) battery threatening the brigade. Messmore responded, "We can try," then rode through the regiment's ranks swinging his sword over his head, asking if the men would follow him. The men erupted in loud cheers, and Messmore then said, "Then we will take yonder battery!" and led the men. The 14th Wisconsin captured the battery, later inscribed with the text "Taken by the 14th Regt. Wis. Vol." The charge of the 14th Wisconsin on the New Orleans battery was depicted in a sketch by A. E. Matthews of the 31st Ohio Infantry Regiment.

Shortly after the capture of the battery, a cannon shell burst near Messmore, wounding him and throwing him from his horse. He was carried from the field. After the battle, Messmore's resignation was processed and he returned to Wisconsin.

Back in Wisconsin, Messmore began raising volunteers for a new regiment. On August 28, 1862, Messmore was commissioned colonel of the 31st Wisconsin Infantry Regiment. The first battalion of the regiment, comprising companies A, B, C, D, E, and F, was mustered into federal service on October 9, 1862, and were assigned to guard Confederate prisoners of war in various locations in Wisconsin until November 14. The regiment then reassembled at Racine, Wisconsin, in December, when the remaining companies were fully enrolled. After further drilling and training, the regiment left the state on March 1, 1863, and proceeded to Columbus, Kentucky, where they remained until the fall. Messmore resigned from the regiment October 2, 1863.

== Postbellum career ==
After the end of the war, Messmore resettled in Washington, D.C., where he was very soon appointed assistant commissioner of the Internal Revenue Bureau. While in Washington, in 1867, he acquired the Meridian Hill estate, an older property which sat a short distance north of the White House; he then subdivided this tract of land, and its lots were sold to create a new neighborhood.

In the late 1860s, he next served on the Metropolitan Revenue Board of the City of New York, primarily fighting excise-tax fraud. Messmore subsequently moved to Grand Rapids, Michigan, where he purchased and became, in 1881, the editor and publisher of the newspaper The Democrat.

He relocated to California, in 1886, first to Orange County, and then to Los Angeles, where he formed a successful law partnership with fellow Wisconsin transplant Amasa Cobb. He was also active in the California Democratic Party and was an unsuccessful candidate for the United States House of Representatives in California's 6th congressional district in 1894. Colonel Messmore was noted to have been a defender of the rights of the average citizen against the economic power of the railroads.

== Personal life and family ==
Isaac Messmore was the fifth of nine known children born to Reverend John Messmore and his wife Jane (née Moat).

On March 29, 1848, Isaac Messmore married Editha Helen McKenney, at Ogle County, Illinois. They had three children together, but she and their eldest child both died of a communicable illness in 1860. In October 1861, Messmore married Margaret (née Jones) Hull, who had been previously married to William H. Hull. With his second wife, Messmore had two more children and became stepfather to her son, William Sinclair Hull.

Isaac Messmore died in California in 1902, two days after the death of his wife, Margaret. Both died of pneumonia. Messmore died in Los Angeles, California on January 8, 1902.
