= 14th Wisconsin Infantry Regiment =

Union Army infantry regiment

- Flag of Wisconsin
- Active: January 30, 1862 – October 9, 1865
- Country: United States
- Allegiance: Union
- Branch: Infantry
- Size: Regiment
- Engagements: American Civil War: Battle of Shiloh; Battle of Corinth; Battle of Iuka; Battle of Champion's Hill; Siege of Vicksburg; Battle of Kennesaw Mountain; Battle of Atlanta; Red River Campaign; Battle of Nashville

Commanders
- Colonel: David E. Wood
- Colonel: John Hancock
- Colonel: Lyman M. Ward
- Captain: Carlos M. G. Mansfield
- Lt. Colonel: Eddy F. Ferris
- Lieutenant Colonel: Isaac E. Messmore

The 14th Wisconsin Infantry Regiment was a volunteer infantry regiment that served in the Union Army during the American Civil War. Four of its members received the Medal of Honor for service in the Second Battle of Corinth, October 3 and 4, 1862; among them the Color-Sergeant Denis Murphy (Green Bay), who, though wounded 3 times, continued bearing the colors throughout the battle.

== Service ==
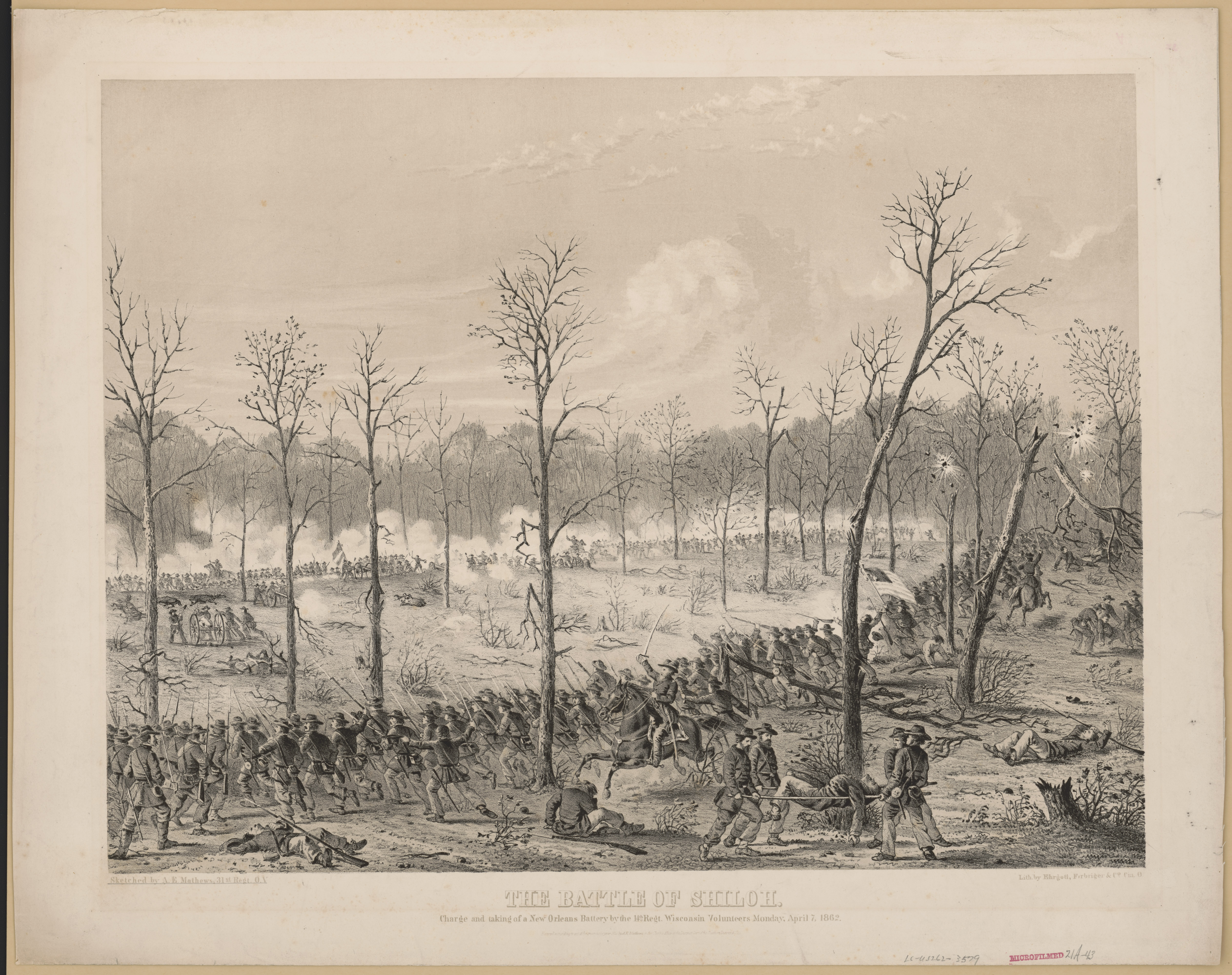
The charge of the 14th Wisconsin Volunteers, capturing the New Orleans Battery at the Battle of Shiloh. Lt. Col. Isaac E. Messmore depicted in the center, riding the horse.

The 14th Wisconsin was raised at Fond du Lac, Wisconsin, under Colonel David E. Wood. Wood was a prominent Fond du Lac citizen, former legislator and Circuit Court judge. The camp in Fond du Lac where they trained was renamed "Camp Wood," after him. The 14th Wisconsin was mustered into Federal service on January 30, 1862.

14th Wisconsin Company Organization
Company	Earliest Moniker	Primary Place of Recruitment	Company Commanders
A	Wood Protectors	Fond du Lac County	Lyman M. Ward; Charles L. Kimball; John V. Frost; Charles F. Williams
B	Waupaca & Portage County Union Rifles	Waupaca County and Portage County	Asa Worden; Sydney Carpenter
C	Omro Union Rifles	Winnebago County	William W. Wilcox; Absalom S. Smith; Asahel Childs
D	Messmore Guards	La Crosse County	James W. Polleys; Samuel A. Harrison; Cyrus P. Shepherd
E	Manitowoc and Kewaunee County Guards	Manitowoc County, Kewaunee County	George E. Waldo †; Levi W. Vaughn †; William I. Henry; Joseph Smith
F	Depere Rifles	Brown County and Dodge County	Joseph G. Lawton; Samuel Harrison †; Delos A. Ward; John P. Ryan
G	Calumet and Manitowoc Invincibles	Calumet County, Brown County and Chippewa County	Frederick H. Magdeburg; Orrin R. Potter; Marion S. Lake
H	Forest Union Rifles	Sheboygan County, Fond du Lac County, Richland County, St. Croix County, and Vernon County	William D. Ghoslin; Carlos M.G. Mansfield; John Kennealy
I	Black River Rangers	Clark County, Jackson County and Buffalo County	Calvin R. Johnson; Michael Crawley
K	Noble Guards	Sauk County	Edward W. Cornes; James V. McCall; John N. Price; John J. Postel

The regiment was mustered out on October 9, 1865, at Mobile, Alabama.

== Casualties ==
The 14th Wisconsin suffered 6 officers and 116 enlisted men killed in action or who later died of their wounds, plus another 3 officers and 194 enlisted men (including Col. Wood) who died of disease, for a total of 319 fatalities.

A metal plaque on the grounds of Camp Randall in Madison, Wisconsin, states that 27 members of the 14th Wisconsin—all of whom are named on the plaque—died as a result of wounds received on April 7, 1862.

== Commanders ==
- Colonel David E. Wood (January 30, 1862 – June 17, 1862) wounded at Shiloh, died of disease.
- Colonel John Hancock (June 17, 1862 – January 23, 1863) wounded at the Second Battle of Corinth, resigned due to disability.
- Colonel Lyman M. Ward (January 23, 1863 – October 9, 1865) mustered out with the regiment, received brevet to brigadier general.
- Captain Carlos M. G. Mansfield (acting March 6, 1864 – November 1864) acted as commander of the regiment while Colonel Ward was in command of the brigade.
- Lt. Colonel Eddy F. Ferris (acting November 1864 – October 9, 1865) acted as commander of the regiment while Colonel Ward was in command of the brigade.

== Notable members ==
- Dugald D. Cameron was surgeon of the regiment, but resigned in September 1862. Before the war he had served as a Wisconsin state legislator; he was a younger brother of Angus Cameron who later became a U.S. senator.
- Calvin R. Johnson, captain of Co. I, after the war became a Wisconsin state representative and county judge.
- Isaac E. Messmore, lieutenant colonel, wounded at Shiloh, later became colonel of the 31st Wisconsin Infantry Regiment.
- Denis J. F. Murphy, sergeant, received the Medal of Honor for actions in the Second Battle of Corinth, where he was wounded three times.
- John Milton Read was sergeant major and then commissioned adjutant of the regiment, he later served as adjutant of the brigade. He was wounded and captured at Second Corinth, but quickly paroled. He was later wounded at Vicksburg. After the war he became a Wisconsin state senator.
- Van Eps Young was first lieutenant of Co. H and adjutant of the regiment from May 1862 to May 1863. He afterward became colonel of the 49th United States Colored Infantry Regiment and was provost marshal of western Mississippi from 1864 through 1866. After the war he served as a Wisconsin state senator.

== See also ==
- List of Wisconsin Civil War units
- Wisconsin in the American Civil War
