= Mathilde Franziska Anneke =

German writer (1817–1884)

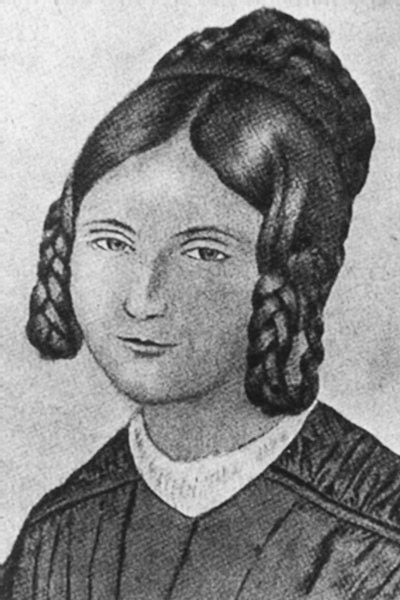
- Born: Mathilde Franziska Giesler; April 4, 1817; Hiddinghausen, Westphalia, Prussia
- Died: November 25, 1884 (aged 67); Milwaukee, Wisconsin, US
- Organization(s): Republican Party (United States), First International, National Woman Suffrage Association (NWSA)
- Movement: Abolitionist, Communist, Women's Rights Movement, German Revolution 1848/49

Mathilde Franziska Anneke (née Giesler; April 3, 1817 – November 25, 1884) was a German writer, feminist, and radical democrat who participated in the Revolutions of 1848–1849. In late 1849, she moved to the United States, where she campaigned to end slavery, agitated to enfranchise women, and ran a girls' school.

== Biography ==
=== Early life, 1817–1841 ===
On April 3, 1817, Mathilde Franziska Giesler was born to a wealthy family in Hiddinghausen (today Sprockhövel) in the Prussian province of Westphalia. Her parents were Karl Giesler (or Gieseler), a prosperous mine owner, and Elisabeth (Hülswitt) Giesler. She was the eldest of twelve children. She was educated in languages, literature, history, and classical studies and mixed with the educated, left-leaning Germans in her parents' circle.

As a teenager, however, Giesler's family suffered a decline in fortune due to investment losses. Her marriage at age nineteen was one strategy to secure family finances. Alfred von Tabouillot, a wealthy wine merchant, agreed to pay off Giesler's father's debts in return for her hand in marriage. The union was short-lived, however, as her new husband was abusive and drank to excess. Mathilde left Alfred within a year, taking her infant daughter, Johanna (known as "Fanny"), with her. The grueling process of obtaining an official divorce (secured in 1841) made it clear that law and custom left women and children vulnerable.

=== As a German radical, 1839–1850 ===
In 1839, Giesler moved to Münster, where she worked as a writer, publishing fiction, poetry, and columns in periodicals and prayer books. Moving in radical circles, she met her second husband, Friedrich (Fritz) Theodor Anneke, in 1845. A passionate communist and former Prussian military officer, Fritz shared Mathilde Anneke's dream of creating a unified, democratic, and egalitarian Germany. The couple married on June 3, 1847, and moved to Cologne in the Rhine Province of Prussia.

It was at this time that Anneke published a feminist treatise, Das Weib im Conflict mit den socialen Verhältnissen (Woman in Conflict with Society). In the 1847 piece defending Berlin feminist Louise Aston, Mathilde argued that society, and especially the Catholic Church, perpetuated a version of marriage that enslaved women. From that time on she distanced herself from organized religion.

Both Annekes organized and published in support of the democratic uprisings in Cologne in 1848. Mathilde continued writing and editing a newspaper after Prussian authorities briefly jailed Fritz for his dissent. In May 1849, shortly after having her first son (Fritz), Mathilde joined her husband in armed support of revolutionary forces in the southern state of Baden. Mathilde assisted Fritz on the battlefield, conveying messages on horseback. Eventually on July 23, 1849, Prussia and Baden defeated the revolutionary forces at Rastatt, Baden.

=== In the United States and Switzerland, 1849–1865 ===
Like many other refugees of the Revolutions of 1848 (the Forty-Eighters), the Anneke family fled to the United States. Following other relatives, they moved to Milwaukee, Wisconsin, in 1849. This chapter of Anneke's life saw her publish beginning in 1852 the Deutsche Frauen-Zeitung (German Women's Newspaper), which was the first woman-owned feminist periodical in the United States. The new venture faced resistance from male printers who boycotted the periodical, and while Anneke continued publication in New Jersey in 1852, the Deutsche Frauen-Zeitung failed after a few years. Anneke continued to write for other German-language publications in the United States.

During the late 1840s to early 1850s, Anneke worked as a journalist and socialist in Milwaukee and was closely affiliated with the Milwaukee Turners, despite the organization not formally admitting women as members until 1904, where she advanced progressive ideals of social reform, education, and equality at Turner Hall. Continuing her work for social justice after settling in Milwaukee, Anneke made a lasting mark on women's history through her activism and advocacy for women's rights.

Anneke's time in New Jersey was fraught with tragedy as she lost four children, including her oldest son Fritz and three younger children. Johanna ("Fanny") left home, while Anneke, her husband, her son Percy, and her daughter Hertha returned to Milwaukee in 1858.

Soon after returning to Milwaukee, Anneke met the Anglo-American abolitionist Mary Booth, and the two developed a close relationship. There is some disagreement among scholars over how to characterize the relationship. Joey Horsley describes it as a lesbian one, while Mischa Honeck describes it as a friendship exhibiting the emotional intensity common between female friends in the mid-nineteenth century. The two women did live together, pool their resources, raise each other's children, and express their passionate love for each other. Anneke moved in with Booth in 1859, while Fritz returned to Europe to report on the war in Italy.

In August 1860, Anneke and Booth moved to Zürich, where they lived with Fritz until he sailed back to the United States to fight in the American Civil War in 1861. The Annekes continued to correspond regularly and sometimes show affection to each other, but they never lived together again. Meanwhile, Anneke and Booth raised three of their children and collaborated to write abolitionist fiction. "Die Sclaven-Auction" (The slave auction) appeared serially in Didaskalia that year, and other collaborative works would follow. They often struggled to get paid for their writing, and their husbands were not forthcoming with financial support, so the two women often had to go into debt to afford necessities. Both were also often unwell, and Booth's progressing tuberculosis finally convinced her to return to the United States in summer 1864 to see her oldest daughter and receive medical care. Anneke was devastated by the separation and saddened although not surprised to learn of Booth's death on April 11, 1865.

=== Later life in the United States, 1865–1884 ===
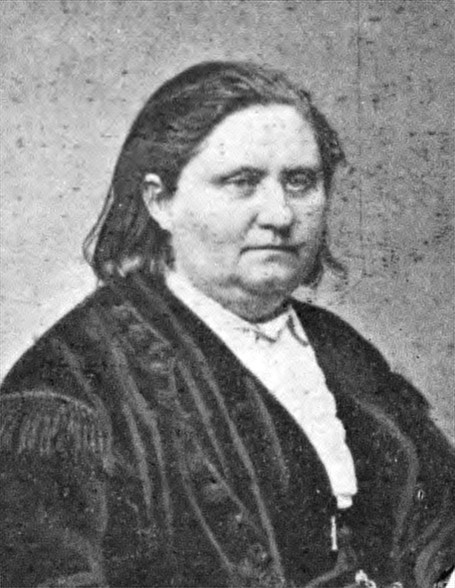
Anneke circa 1875

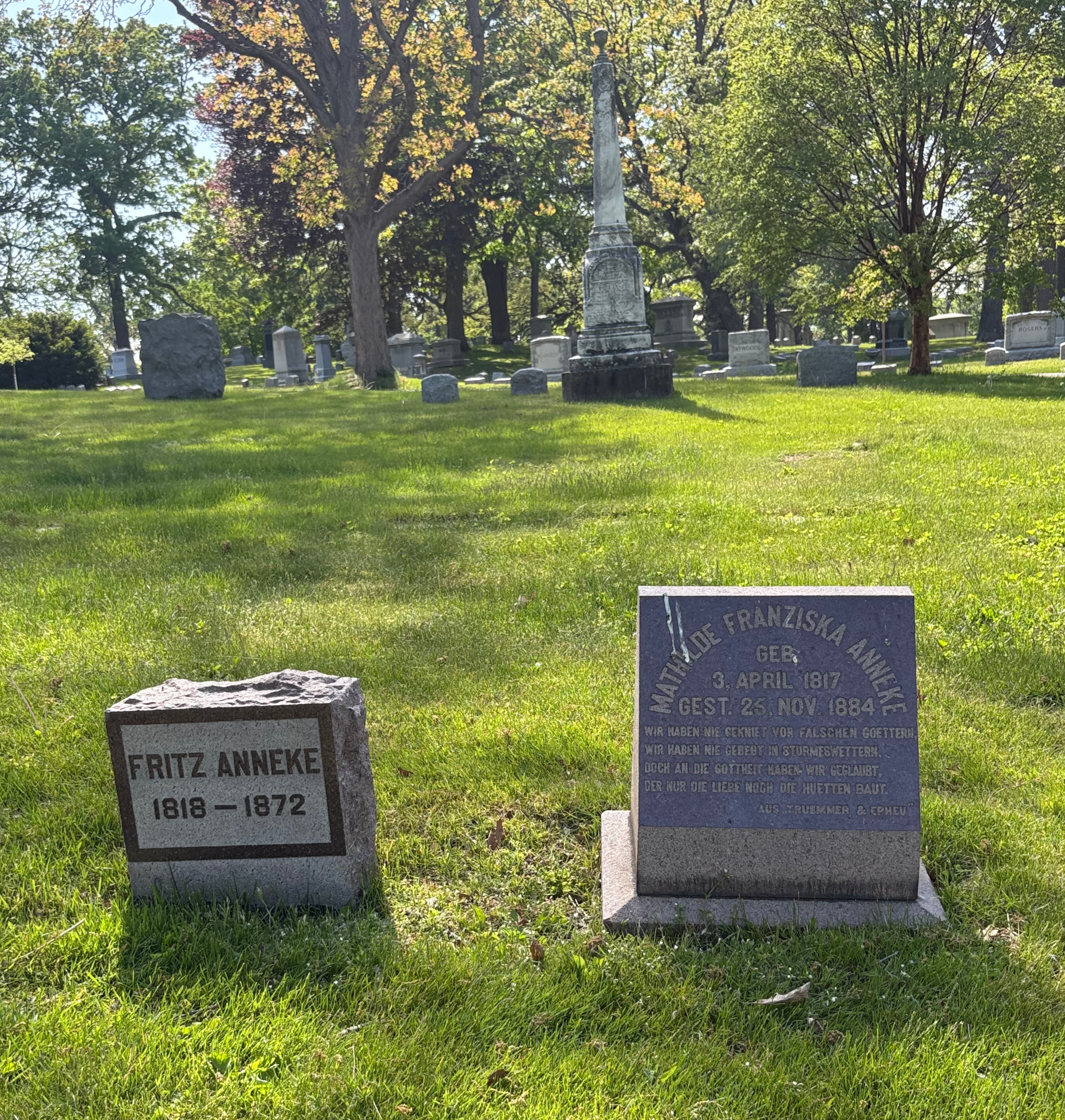
Graves of Fritz and Mathilde Franziska Anneke at Forest Home Cemetery

Anneke returned to Milwaukee in 1865 with another female friend, Cäcilie Kapp, and opened a private girls' school called the Töchter-Institut (Daughters' Institute). Some of Milwaukee's most prominent German American families sent their daughters to the school, and Anneke won wide respect in the community despite espousing views that identified her with radicalism.

Anneke had participated in women's suffrage events back in the 1850s and became more focused on the cause after the war. She corresponded with leaders such as Elizabeth Cady Stanton, Susan B. Anthony, and Elizabeth Miller. She was elected as a vice-president (representing Wisconsin) at the inaugural meeting of the National Woman Suffrage Association in 1869, joining women who protested that the Fifteenth Amendment had not prohibited discrimination in voting law on the basis of sex as well as race. Woman suffrage was unpopular among men in the US, especially immigrant men, who associated it with temperance and Yankee Protestantism. Anneke found herself mediating between the organized suffrage movement and the immigrant community within which she felt comfortable. In the 1870s, Anneke was active in social justice moments in Milwaukee, Wisconsin. She was even affiliated with the Milwaukee Turners, although, the national organization did not grant women full membership until 1904. In 1876, she founded a women-only chapter of the International Workingmen's Association. Although she occasionally gave speeches in English, she preferred to use German throughout her life.

Mathilde Anneke died on November 23, 1884, in Milwaukee, Wisconsin, and was buried in Milwaukee's Forest Home Cemetery.
