= Charles Carr Clark =

US Army colonel (1866–1930)

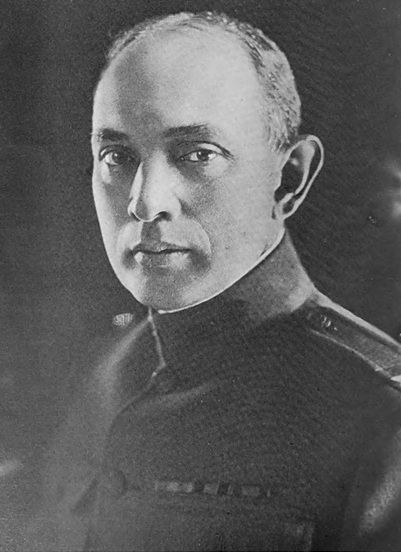
- Clark as a colonel in 1920
- Born: 29 November 1866; Greenfield, Lackawannock Township, Pennsylvania, US
- Died: 4 March 1930 (aged 63); Washington, DC, US
- Burial place: Arlington National Cemetery
- Education: United States Military Academy; United States Army Command and General Staff College
- Spouse: Rebecca (Ezekiels) Clark (m. 1891–1930)
- Children: 2 (including Mark W. Clark)
- Military career
- Service: United States Army
- Service years: 1890–1920
- Rank: Colonel
- Unit: US Army Infantry Branch
- Commands: Field Telegraph Train, Tampa, Florida; 6th U.S. Volunteer Signal Company; Chief Commissary, Department of the Gulf; 3rd Battalion, 27th Infantry Regiment; 3rd Battalion, Provisional Regiment; 3rd Battalion, 15th Infantry Regiment; 46th Infantry Regiment; 17th Infantry Brigade; 18th Infantry Brigade; 9th Division; Camp Sheridan, Alabama
- Conflicts: Spanish–American War; Military Government of Cuba; Philippine–American War; World War I

Charles C. Clark (29 November 1866 – 4 March 1930) was a career officer in the United States Army. An 1890 graduate of the United States Military Academy at West Point, he served until retiring with the rank of colonel in 1920. Clark was a veteran of Spanish–American War, Philippine–American War, and World War I. A highly regarded administrator, trainer and organizer, his First World War commands included the 46th Infantry Regiment, 17th Infantry Brigade, 18th Infantry Brigade, and 9th Division during their initial activation.

A native of Greenfield, Lackawannock Township, Pennsylvania, Clark was raised and educated in Greenville and in 1886 obtained an appointment to the United States Military Academy (West Point). He graduated in 1890 and was commissioned as a second lieutenant of Infantry. His initial assignments were at posts in Arizona, as well as Madison Barracks and Fort Ontario, New York. He served in Puerto Rico during the Spanish–American War, followed by duty during the Military Government of Cuba.

From 1900 to 1902, Clark served in the Philippines during the Philippine–American War, which was followed temporary commissary of subsistence duty at posts in Illinois and Georgia. Clark graduated from the United States Army Command and General Staff College in 1911, which was followed by command of battalions in the United States and China. During World War I, he performed quartermaster duty in Chicago, followed by command of regiments and brigades in the 9th Division, in addition to commanding the division itself.

In 1920, Clark requested retirement, after which he resided in Ballston, Virginia. He died in Washington, DC on 4 March 1930 and was buried at Arlington National Cemetery. Clark was the father of General Mark W. Clark.

== Early life ==
Charles Carr Clark was born in the unincorporated village of Greenfield in Lackawannock Township, Pennsylvania on 29 November 1866, the son of Dr. Anson T. Clark and Adelia F. (Carr) Clark. He was raised and educated in Greenville, Pennsylvania, and in July 1886 was appointed as an alternate to the United States Military Academy (West Point) by US Representative George Washington Fleeger. The primary candidate did not pass his entrance examination, enabling Clark to beginning attending in September 1886.

Clark graduated in 1890 ranked 49th of 54. Among his classmates who became general officers were Edgar Jadwin, Charles Keller, Herbert Deakyne, Colden Ruggles, Henry D. Todd Jr., William Church Davis, Clint Calvin Hearn, James R. Lindsay, Francis Cutler Marshall, William S. McNair, William J. Snow, George G. Gatley, Fred Winchester Sladen, James A. Ryan, Harry Hill Bandholtz, Frank Merrill Caldwell, James Joseph Hornbrook, and George Davis Moore, and Milton Fennimore Davis. At graduation, Clark received his commission as a second lieutenant of Infantry.

=== Family ===
In August 1891, Clark married Rebecca Ezekiels. They were married until his death and were the parents of daughter Jeanette and son Mark. Mark W. Clark was a career army officer and attained the rank of general as a senior commander during World War II.

== Start of career ==
Clark's initial assignments were with the 9th U.S. Infantry at Whipple Barracks, Fort Verde, and Fort Huachuca between October 1890 and October 1891. From October 1891 to July 1897, he served with the 9th Infantry at Madison Barracks and Fort Ontario, New York. In June 1897 he was promoted to first lieutenant in the 5th Infantry Regiment and assigned to Fort McPherson, Georgia. In June 1898, Clark was assigned to Spanish–American War duty with the Signal Corps. Promoted to temporary captain, he commanded the field telegraph train at the port of Tampa, Florida from June to July 1898. He continued in command of the train at Guánica, Ponce, and Mayagüez, Puerto Rico from July to September 1898. From November to December 1898, Clark commanded the 6th U.S. Volunteer Signal Company at Camp George Meade, Pennsylvania and Camp McKenzie near Augusta, Georgia.

In November 1898, Clark was discharged from the volunteers and assigned as aide-de-camp to Brigadier General Richard Comba, who commanded a brigade during the Military Government of Cuba. Beginning in March 1899, he served in Cuba with the 9th Infantry. He was promoted to captain in January 1900. In July 1900, he passed through the United States en route to Philippine–American War duty with the 5th Infantry in the Ilocos Sur province, which included postings to Sinait and Magsingal. In March 1901, he was assigned as the 5th Infantry's commissary officer, which required him to travel to several sites throughout the Philippines. Clark returned to the United States in March 1902, and after an extended leave of absence, in August he was assigned to the examining board that considered the qualifications of civilian applicants for direct commissions in the army. He rejoined the 5th Infantry at Plattsburgh Barracks, New York in August 1903.

== Continued career ==
In April 1905, Clark was detailed to a four-year temporary assignment with the Commissary of Subsistence Department. From April 1905 to May 1906, he was assistant to the chief commissary for the Department of the Lakes in Chicago. He was then assigned as chief commissary for the Department of the Gulf at Fort McPherson, Georgia. Clark's temporary duty with the commissary department expired in April 1909, and he was assigned to the 27th Infantry Regiment at Fort Sheridan, Illinois.

Clark served at Fort Sheridan only briefly, because in late April 1909 he was assigned to attend the Army School of the Line at Fort Leavenworth, Kansas. He completed the course in June 1910, and was named a distinguished graduate. Clark was then selected to attend the United States Army Command and General Staff College. He was promoted to major in June 1911 and graduated from the staff college later that month. In July 1911, Clark was assigned to command 3rd Battalion, 27th Infantry Regiment at Fort Sheridan and during maneuvers and exercises near Dubuque, Iowa. From June to August 1912, he commanded the 3rd Battalion of a provisional regiment that was formed near Sparta, Wisconsin in order to test new tactics and equipment prior to their fielding to the full army.

== Later career ==
In September, Clark was transferred to the 15th Infantry Regiment, and in January he joined the regiment in Tianjin, China as commander of its 3rd Battalion. In addition to Tianjin, he served in Lechang and Tangshan. he returned to the United States in November 1915 and was assigned to temporary quartermaster duty at the Chicago Quartermaster Depot. A highly regarded administrator, he was promoted to lieutenant colonel in July 1916 and continued to perform quartermaster duties in Chicago. American entry into World War I occurred in April 1917, and Clark was promoted to temporary colonel in August 1917.

Long recognized by his superiors and peers as an effective trainer and organizer, in March 1918 he was appointed to command the 46th Infantry Regiment during its creation and manning at Camp Zachary Taylor, Kentucky. The 46th Infantry was a unit of the 9th Division's 17th Infantry Brigade, and as a senior colonel, Clark commanded both the brigade and the division at different times during the division's organization and training at Camp Gordon, Georgia and Camp Sheridan near Montgomery, Alabama. He later commanded the 9th Division's 18th Infantry Brigade, and as the ranking officer at Camp Sheridan following the departure of the 37th Division, he assumed command of the post in June 1918 and remained in charge through September. The Armistice of November 11, 1918 ended the war before the 9th Division departed for combat in France, and Clark remained in charge of the 18th Brigade during the division's demobilization and the discharge of its soldiers. The division was inactivated in February 1919, and Clark commanded the 46th Infantry Regiment at Fort Oglethorpe, Georgia and Camp Jackson, South Carolina.

In early 1920, Clark requested retirement, which was approved effective 18 March. In retirement, he resided in Ballston, Virginia. He died at Walter Reed Army Hospital in Washington, DC on 4 March 1930. Clark was buried at Arlington National Cemetery.

== Dates of rank ==
Clark's dates of rank were:

- Second Lieutenant, 12 June 1890
- First Lieutenant, 1 June 1897
- Captain (United States Volunteers), 2 June 1898
- Captain, 12 January 1900
- Major, 1 June 1911
- Lieutenant Colonel, 19 July 1916
- Colonel (Army of the United States), 5 August 1917
- Colonel, 4 January 1919
- Colonel (Retired), 18 March 1920
