= James A. Ryan =

U.S. Army brigadier general

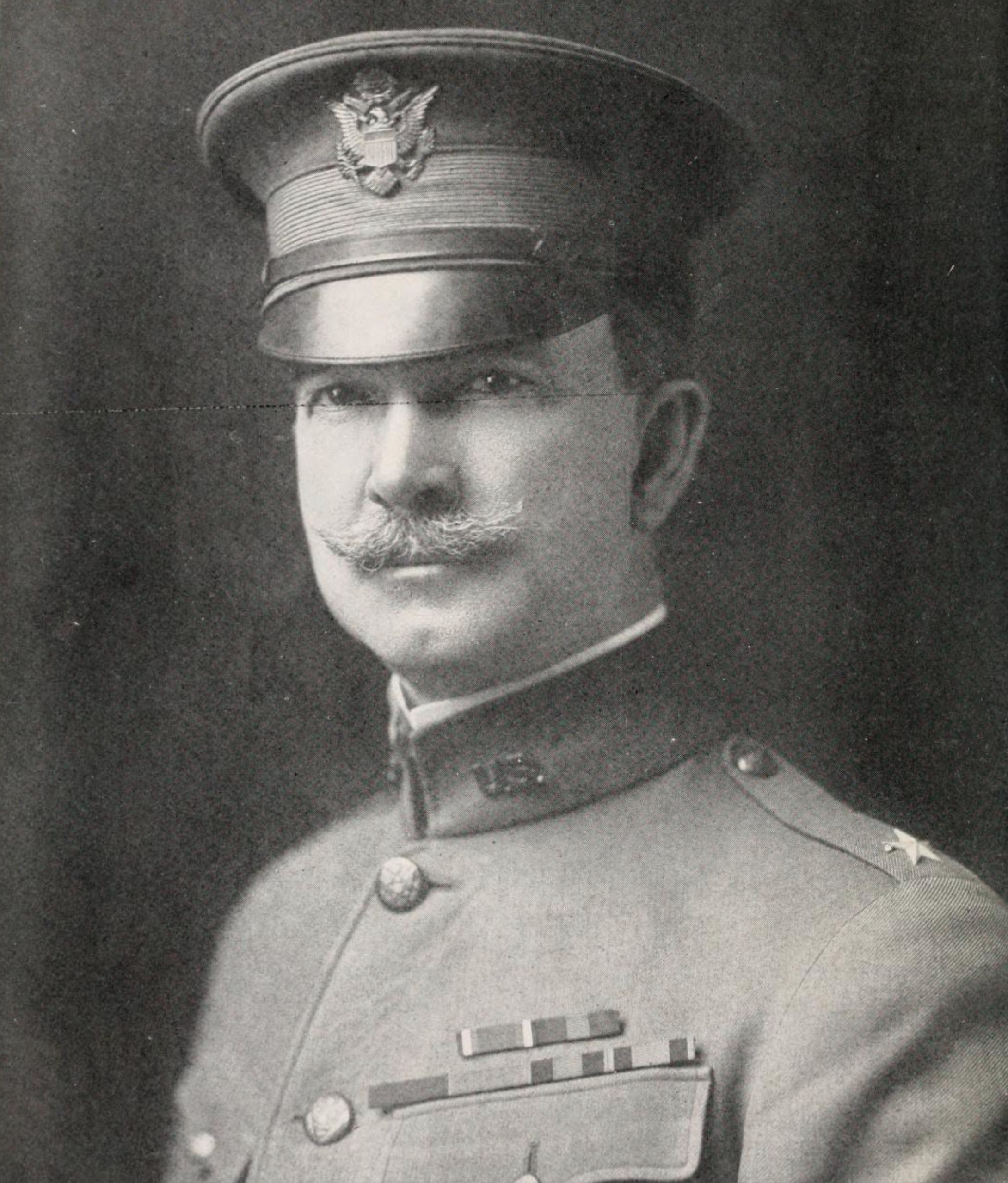
- From 1920's The History and Achievements of the Fort Sheridan Officers' Training Camps
- Born: November 22, 1867; Danbury, Connecticut, U.S.
- Died: January 14, 1956 (aged 88); St. Petersburg, Florida, U.S.
- Burial place: West Point Cemetery
- Education: United States Military Academy; United States Army Command and General Staff College
- Spouse: Rosemary Tarleton (m. 1911–1935)
- Children: 1
- Military career
- Service: United States Army
- Service years: 1890–1919
- Rank: Brigadier General
- Service number: 0-13370
- Unit: U.S. Army Cavalry Branch
- Commands: A Troop, 9th Cavalry Regiment; Troop M, 15th Cavalry Regiment; American Relief Commission, Berlin; Officers' Training Camp, Fort Sheridan; 1st Brigade, 15th Cavalry Division; 17th Brigade, 9th Division; 9th Division
- Wars: American Indian Wars; Spanish–American War; Philippine–American War; Provisional Government of Cuba; Mexican Border War; Pancho Villa Expedition; World War I
- Other work: Business executive

James Augustine Ryan (October 22, 1867 – January 14, 1956) was a career officer in the United States Army. A veteran of the American Indian Wars, Spanish–American War, Philippine–American War, Pancho Villa Expedition, and World War I, he attained the rank of brigadier general. During the First World War, Ryan commanded the 1st Brigade, 15th Cavalry Division at Fort Sam Houston, Texas, and the 17th Brigade, 9th Division at Camp Sheridan, Alabama, in addition to acting as the 9th Division commander on several occasions.

A native of Danbury, Connecticut, Ryan graduated from the United States Military Academy at West Point in 1890 and was commissioned in the Cavalry. He served in the western states during the American Indian Wars and took part in the Yukon Relief Mission (1897–1898). He commanded a Cavalry troop in the Spanish–American War and took part in the Siege of Santiago. Ryan went on to serve in the Philippines during the Philippine–American War. As he advanced through the ranks, subsequent assignments included being a member of the West Point faculty.

At the start of World War I, Ryan was in charge of the U.S. commission that evacuated U.S. citizens from Germany and Austria. During the war, he commanded 1st Brigade, 15th Cavalry Division and 17th Brigade, 9th Division during their organization and training in the United States.

Ryan retired from the army in 1920 and pursued a long career as a Chicago-based business executive. After retiring from business in 1942, he resided in St. Petersburg, Florida. He died in St. Petersburg on January 14, 1956. Ryan was buried at West Point Cemetery in West Point, New York.

== Early life ==
James Augustine Ryan was born in Danbury, Connecticut on October 22, 1867, a son of James Ryan and Hannah (Doran) Ryan, immigrants from County Leitrim, Ireland. He was educated at the Liberty Street School in Danbury and graduated from Danbury High School in 1884. In June 1885, Ryan competed for an appointment to the United States Military Academy (West Point). He attained the examining board's top score and was appointed by U.S. Representative Edward W. Seymour in July.

Ryan attended West Point from 1886 to 1890, when he graduated ranked 28th of 54. Among his classmates who also became general officers were Edgar Jadwin, Charles Keller, Herbert Deakyne, Colden Ruggles, William O. Johnson, Henry D. Todd Jr., Clint Calvin Hearn, William Church Davis, James R. Lindsay, Francis Cutler Marshall, Frank G. Mauldin, Daniel Warren Ketcham, William S. McNair, William J. Snow, George G. Gatley, Fred Winchester Sladen, Harry Hill Bandholtz, Frank Merrill Caldwell, Henry G. Learnard, James Joseph Hornbrook, Peter Murray, George Davis Moore, and Vernon A. Caldwell.

At graduation, Ryan was commissioned a second lieutenant of Cavalry. Assigned initially to the 10th Cavalry, he served with this regiment at Fort Apache, Arizona, until May 1892. During this posting, Ryan participated in the Apache Wars, including skirmishes against warriors led by the Apache Kid.

== Early career ==
From May 1892 to until October 1895, Ryan served with the 10th Cavalry at Fort Leavenworth, Kansas. Ryan was then posted to Fort Assinniboine, Montana with the 10th Cavalry, where he remained until March 1897. He was promoted to first lieutenant of the 9th Cavalry in February 1897. During his Fort Assinniboine posting, Ryan took part in the roundup and deportation of Canadian Cree people led by Little Bear, who were subsequently returned to Alberta and Saskatchewan. After leaving Montana, Ryan was assigned to duty with the Yukon Relief Mission, which provided emergency assistance to Klondike Gold Rush miners when they experienced severe food shortages.

In May 1898, Ryan joined the 9th Cavalry in Tampa, Florida as it was equipped and organized for Spanish–American War duty in Cuba. He commanded the regiment's A Troop during the Siege of Santiago, and was appointed regimental quartermaster in August 1898. In September 1898, the 9th Cavalry was assigned to Camp Grant, Arizona. Ryan was appointed regimental adjutant in January 1899. In July 1899, Ryan was assigned to recruiting duty in Denver, Colorado. From November 1899 to August 1900, he served as aide-de-camp to Brigadier General Henry C. Merriam, commander of the Department of the Colorado and Department of the Missouri.

== Continued career ==
In August 1900, Ryan began a tour of duty in the Philippines during the Philippine–American War. He remained there until August 1903 and was promoted to captain of the 15th Cavalry Regiment in February 1901. During his Philippines service, Ryan was among the U.S. officers accused of using the water cure and other harsh interrogation measures on Filipino prisoners. Ryan was court-martialed and admitted the facts of the allegations against him. In his defense, he argued that his actions were a military necessity and did not cause enough harm to his interrogation subjects to be considered torture. The court agreed, and Ryan was acquitted.

From August 1903 to August 1905, Ryan served as adjutant of the 15th Cavalry, first at Fort Myer, Virginia and then at Fort Ethan Allen, Vermont. From August 1905 to October 1906, he was a student at Fort Leavenworth, first attending the Infantry and Cavalry School, then the United States Army Command and General Staff College. From November 1906 to February 1908, Ryan served in the Provisional Government of Cuba as aide-de-camp to provisional governor Charles Edward Magoon.

In February 1909, Ryan was assigned to Fort Sheridan, Illinois as commander of Troop M, 15th Cavalry. From August 1911 to July 1914, Ryan served as assistant professor of modern languages on the West Point faculty. In September 1912, he was promoted to major in the 5th Cavalry Regiment. From July to October 1914, he performed duty in Berlin, Germany as officer in charge of the Assistant Secretary of War's relief commission that facilitated the departure of U.S. citizens from Germany and Austria at the start of World War I. In October 1914, he was transferred to the 13th Cavalry Regiment and assigned to Columbus, New Mexico on patrol duty during the Mexican Border War. From December 1914 to March 1916, he served at Camp Harry J. Jones, Arizona, first with the 13th Cavalry, and later as adjutant of the 2nd Cavalry Brigade. From March to May 1916, he served as Intelligence officer (G-2) on the staff of U.S. commander John J. Pershing during the Pancho Villa Expedition, after which he returned to duty with the 13th Cavalry.

== Later career ==
Ryan was promoted to lieutenant colonel of the 1st Cavalry Regiment in July 1916 and served with the regiment at Camp Harry J. Jones. In January 1917, he was posted to duty as instructor and inspector of the Illinois National Guard. With U.S. entry into World War I causing an increased need for lieutenants and captains, the army began operation of several Officers' Training Centers. Ryan commanded the first two Officers' Training Centers at Fort Sheridan, one from May to August, and the second from August to December. Ryan was promoted to colonel in July 1917.

In December 1917, Ryan was promoted to temporary brigadier general and assigned to command 1st Brigade, 15th Cavalry Division at Fort Sam Houston. When the army determined that Cavalry units would not be required for combat in France, Ryan requested assignment to an Infantry brigade. He was then assigned to command the 17th Brigade, a unit of the 9th Division, which was being organized and trained at Camp Sheridan, Alabama. The Armistice of November 11, 1918 ended the war before the 9th Division could depart for France. Ryan continued to command the 17th Brigade until April 1919, and acted as the division commander on several occasions. He retired at his permanent rank of colonel, but in 1930 the U.S. Congress enacted legislation permitting the general officers of World War I to retire at their highest rank, and he was promoted to brigadier general on the retired list.

== Later life and death ==
After leaving the army, Ryan pursued a civilian business career, initially as an executive with Merrill Lynch & Co. in Chicago. Subsequent endeavors included field representative for the Texas Company, an oil company that conducted business in Mexico. While in Mexico, Ryan assisted in negotiating the Bucareli Treaty, which settled claims by U.S. corporations for losses they sustained during the Mexican Revolution.

Ryan's later endeavors included a close association with Samuel Insull, and among them were vice president and general manager of the Utility Securities Corporation and vice president and general manager of the Middle Creek Railway Company. In addition, he served as vice president and general manager of the Middle West Utilities Corporation and vice president and general manager of Insull Son & Company.

In the 1920s and 1930s, he was president of the Public Health Institute of Chicago, a privately funded enterprise that worked to eliminate sexually transmitted infections among Chicago's poor and working classes. In addition, he served as president of United Medical Service, Inc. of Chicago, a for-profit corporation that operated a medical clinic. From 1940 to 1942, he served as president of Ryber, Inc., another Chicago-based business.

Ryan retired in 1942. In retirement, Ryan was a resident of St. Petersburg, Florida. He died in St. Petersburg on January 14, 1956. Ryan was buried at West Point Cemetery.

== Awards ==
Ryan's awards included:

- Indian Campaign Medal
- Spanish Campaign Medal
- Philippine Campaign Medal
- Cuban Pacification Medal
- Mexican Service Medal
- World War I Victory Medal

== Family ==
In February 1911, Ryan married Rosemary Tarleton, a native of Ireland. They divorced in 1935, and were the parents of a son, Reginald Tarrant Ryan.
