= George G. Gatley =

United States Army general

George Grant Gatley
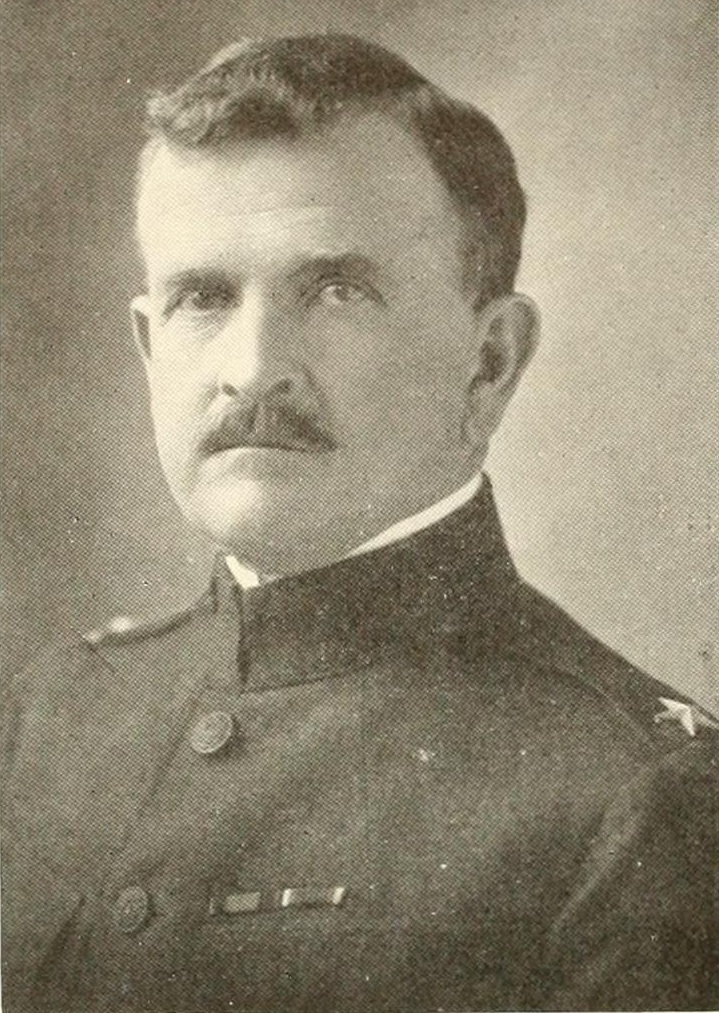
- From 1920's History of the Fifty-Fifth Field Artillery Brigade.
- Born: September 10, 1868; Portland, Maine, U.S.
- Died: January 8, 1931 (aged 62); San Francisco, California, U.S.
- Burial place: San Francisco National Cemetery
- Spouse: Elizabeth "Bessie" Walton Crabb (m. 1897)
- Relatives: 2 daughters (including Ann Harding)
- Military career
- Allegiance: United States
- Branch: United States Army
- Service years: 1890–1931
- Rank: Brigadier General
- Service number: 0-223
- Unit: United States Army Field Artillery Branch
- Commands: Battery K, 5th Field Artillery; 17th Field Artillery Battery; 55th Field Artillery Brigade, 30th Division; 67th Field Artillery Brigade, 42nd Division; 30th Division; 42nd Division; 8th Field Artillery Brigade; 10th Field Artillery Regiment; Overseas Discharge and Replacement Depot, Fort McDowell; 15th Field Artillery Brigade
- Conflicts: Spanish–American War; Moro Rebellion; Pancho Villa Expedition; World War I

George Grant Gatley (September 10, 1868 – January 8, 1931) was a career officer in the United States Army. He attained the rank of brigadier general, and his World War I commands included the 30th and 42nd Infantry Divisions.

== Early life ==
George G. Gatley was born in Portland, Maine on September 10, 1868, a son of Richard K. Gatley and Sarah (Markham) Gatley. He attended the public schools of Portland, and graduated from the United States Military Academy in 1890. Ranked 25 of 54, he was commissioned in the Field Artillery. Several of Gatley's classmates also became general officers, including Colden Ruggles, Fred W. Sladen, Frank M. Caldwell, Clint C. Hearn, Daniel W. Ketcham, Edgar Jadwin, Francis Marshall, Harry H. Bandholtz, Henry D. Todd Jr., William C. Davis, William S. McNair, Herbert Deakyne, William J. Snow, and James J. Hornbrook. He served initially with the 5th Field Artillery, and later with the 2nd and 3rd Field Artillery.

== Start of career ==
During the Spanish–American War, Gatley commanded Battery K, 5th Field Artillery; after completing mobilization and deployment training, his battery was at the Tampa, Florida port of embarkation awaiting transport to Cuba when the war ended. He was promoted to captain in 1901, and served in the Philippines during the Moro Rebellion as commander of the 17th Field Artillery Battery.

Gatley served in Cuba from 1906 to 1913, first as part of the U.S. occupation force, and later as an artillery trainer and instructor for the Cuban Army; he was promoted to major in 1911. He was with the 13th Field Artillery on the Mexican border during the Pancho Villa Expedition; from 1915 to 1917 he was a member of the Army's Ordnance Board, which designed and tested new cannons, and made recommendations about which ones to procure. He was promoted to lieutenant colonel in 1916, and colonel in May, 1917, shortly after the American entry into World War I.

== World War I ==
In August 1917, Gatley was promoted to brigadier general as commander of the 55th Field Artillery Brigade, a unit of the 30th Division. He subsequently transferred to command of the 67th Field Artillery Brigade of the 42nd Division, which he led until the end of the war. He took part in the Champagne-Marne, Aisne-Marne, St. Mihiel, and Meuse-Argonne battles and offensives. From December 1917 to January 1918, Gatley commanded the 30th Division. In 1919 he commanded the 42nd Division during part of its post-war occupation duty in Germany.

== Later career ==
Gatley commanded the 8th Field Artillery Brigade at Fort Knox, Kentucky from 1919 to 1920, and graduated from the Army War College in 1921. From 1921 to 1924, he commanded the 10th Field Artillery at Camp Pike, Arkansas and Fort Lewis, Washington. Gatley commanded the Overseas Discharge and Replacement Depot at Fort McDowell, California from 1924 to 1929.

== Death and burial ==
He was commander of the 15th Field Artillery Brigade when he became ill in December, 1929. He was hospitalized at Walter Reed Army Medical Center until April, 1930, when he was transferred to Letterman Army Hospital in San Francisco. Gatley died in San Francisco, California on January 8, 1931. He was buried at San Francisco National Cemetery, Section OS, Row 1, Site 11.

At his death, Gatley held the permanent rank of colonel. His rank of brigadier general was restored after he died as the result of a 1930 law which allowed World War I generals to retire at the highest rank they had held.

== Family ==
In 1897, Gatley married Elizabeth "Bessie" Walton Crabb (1876–1954), the daughter of Major George W. Crabb of the 5th Field Artillery. They were the parents of two daughters: Edith (1898–1985), the wife of Robert T. Nash and John Donald MacKenzie; and Dorothy (1902–1981), an actress whose stage name was Ann Harding.

== Sources ==
=== Books ===
- Cullum, George W.; Holden, Edward Singleton (1920). Biographical Register of the Officers and Graduates of the U.S. Military Academy. Vol. VI–A. Saginaw, MI: Seemann & Peters. p. 552.
- Davis, Henry Blaine Jr. (1998). Generals in Khaki. Raleigh, NC: Pentland Press. pp. 140–141. ISBN 978-1-57197-088-6.
- Rinaldi, Richard A. (2005). The US Army In World War I: Orders Of Battle. Takoma Park, MD: General Data LLC. pp. 38–39, 45. ISBN 978-0-9720296-4-3.

=== Newspapers ===
- Church, W. C.; Church, F. P. (February 20, 1897). "Married: Gatley-Crabb". Army and Navy Journal. Washington, DC. p. 454 – via Google Books.
- "Gen. Gatley, 55th Brigade Chief, is Dead". Nashville Tennessean. Nashville, TN. January 22, 1931. pp. 1, 3 – via Newspapers.com.

=== Internet ===
- Finnie, Moira (December 28, 2010). "Ann Harding: A Q & A With Biographer Scott O'Brien". Streamline, the FilmStruck Blog. New York, NY: TCM Interactive Group Inc. Archived from the original on February 12, 2017.
- US Department of War (April 7, 1931). "U.S. National Cemetery Interment Control Forms, 1928-1962, Entry for George G. Gatley". Ancestry.com. Lehi, UT: Ancestry.com, LLC.
- "1870 United States Federal Census, Entry for Richard K. Gatley Family". Ancestry.com. Lehi, UT: Ancestry.com LLC.
