= William J. Snow =

United States Army general

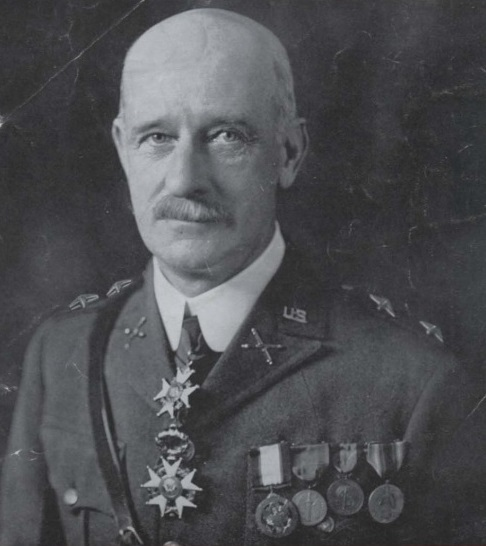
- Major General William J. Snow on the front cover of the June 1946 edition of the Field Artillery Journal.
- Born: December 16, 1868; Brooklyn, New York, United States
- Died: February 27, 1947 (aged 78); Washington, D.C., United States
- Burial place: Arlington National Cemetery, Virginia, United States
- Spouse: Isabel O’Hear Locke (1872-1944) (m. 1892)
- Military career
- Allegiance: United States
- Branch: United States Army
- Service years: 1890–1927
- Rank: Major General
- Service number: 0-25
- Unit: Field Artillery Branch
- Commands: 2nd Battalion, 3rd Field Artillery Regiment; 1st Battalion, 2nd Field Artillery Regiment (Mountain); 1st Field Artillery Regiment; 4th Field Artillery Regiment; United States Army Field Artillery School; 156th Field Artillery Brigade; Chief of Field Artillery
- Conflicts: Spanish–American War; Philippine–American War; World War I
- Awards: Army Distinguished Service Medal; Order of the Bath (Companion) (Great Britain); Legion of Honor (Commander) (France)
- Other work: Secretary, United States Field Artillery Association; Editor, Field Artillery Journal

William Josiah Snow (December 16, 1868 – February 27, 1947) was a career officer in the United States Army. He attained the rank of major general, and served as the Chief of Field Artillery for seven years in the 1920s.

A native of Brooklyn, New York, who grew up in New Jersey, Snow graduated from the United States Military Academy in 1890 and commenced a long career in the Army's field artillery branch. After serving in New York early in his career, he graduated from the artillery school at Fort Monroe and took part in the Spanish–American War by performing coast artillery duty in Louisiana. He then served in the Philippines during the Philippine–American War before returning to the United States to command a battery at Fort Riley. He spent several years on duty at the Militia Bureau, and commanded a battalion at Fort Myer. He commanded the 1st Field Artillery Regiment in the period immediately preceding World War I.

During World War I, Snow commanded the 4th Field Artillery Regiment, the Field Artillery School, and the 156th Field Artillery Brigade. In 1918 he was assigned to serve as the first Chief of Field Artillery as a major general, and held this position until retiring in 1927. Snow died in Washington, D.C., in 1947, and was buried at Arlington National Cemetery.

== Early life ==
William Josiah Snow was born in Brooklyn, New York, on December 16, 1868, the son of William Dunham Snow and Mary Elizabeth (Newell) Snow. In 1876, his family moved to River Vale, New Jersey, and Snow graduated from Hackensack High School in 1885. He attended the Stevens Institute of Technology from 1885 to 1886, and then began attendance at the United States Military Academy (USMA) at West Point, New York. He graduated in 1890, and was ranked 24th of 54 students. His classmates included Colden Ruggles, Fred W. Sladen, Frank M. Caldwell, Clint C. Hearn, Daniel W. Ketcham, Edgar Jadwin, Francis Marshall, Harry H. Bandholtz, Henry D. Todd Jr., William C. Davis, George G. Gatley, William S. McNair and Herbert Deakyne. All of these men would, like Snow himself, attain the rank of general officer. Snow received his commission as a second lieutenant in the Field Artillery Branch, and was assigned to the 1st Artillery Regiment.

== Start of career ==
From 1890 to 1894, Snow served at Fort Hamilton and Fort Wadsworth in New York, and alternated between coast artillery and field artillery duties. In 1896 he began attendance at the Fort Monroe, Virginia, artillery school, and he graduated in 1898.

During the Spanish–American War, Snow performed coast artillery duty at Fort St. Philip, Louisiana, and was promoted to first lieutenant. He then traveled to Fort Slocum, New York, to serve as quartermaster of the 7th Artillery Regiment. In 1900, Snow was assigned to 1st Battery, 7th Artillery which was slated for assignment to China during the Boxer Rebellion. The battery was subsequently ordered to the Philippines for service in the Philippine–American War, and Snow served there until May 1901.

== Continued career ==
Snow was promoted to captain in 1901 and assigned to Fort Riley, Kansas, as commander of the 20th Field Battery (Horse), which was later re-designated as Battery E, 6th Field Artillery Regiment. He attended the Army War College from 1907 to 1908, after which he returned to the 6th Field Artillery to serve as regimental adjutant. In 1910, Snow played the lead role in organizing the United States Field Artillery Association; he became its first secretary and the first editor of the Field Artillery Journal.

In 1910, Snow was assigned to the Militia Bureau as senior inspector and instructor of National Guard artillery units. He was commended for his work to standardize unit organizations and training activities, efforts which were credited with enabling National Guard artillery organizations to perform capably during World War I. Snow was promoted to major in 1911, and from 1911 to 1914 he commanded 2nd Battalion, 3rd Field Artillery at Fort Myer, Virginia.

Snow was assigned to the 2nd Field Artillery (Mountain) at Camp Stotsenburg, Philippines, in January 1915. He commanded the regiment's 1st Battalion until June 1916, when he was assigned to command the 1st Field Artillery Regiment at Schofield Barracks, Hawaii. Snow was promoted to lieutenant colonel in June and colonel in July.

== World War I ==
In April 1917, the same month of the American entry into World War I, Snow was assigned to command the 4th Field Artillery Regiment, which he led during training at Fort Bliss, Texas, and at a temporary camp in Syracuse, New York. in July 1917, Snow was selected to command the Field Artillery School at Fort Sill, Oklahoma, and promoted to brigadier general. While at the school, Snow began the process of reorganizing it and modernizing the program of instruction to meet the increased demand created by the war.

Snow was assigned to command the 156th Field Artillery Brigade at Camp Jackson, South Carolina, in September 1917. In February 1918, Snow was selected to serve as the first chief of field artillery, an unofficial position created to oversee the field artillery branch's wartime mobilization and training, and he was promoted to major general in June. In this role, he created a system of training centers and replacement depots, which enabled the artillery branch to meet the wartime demand for qualified artillerymen.

== Post-World War I ==
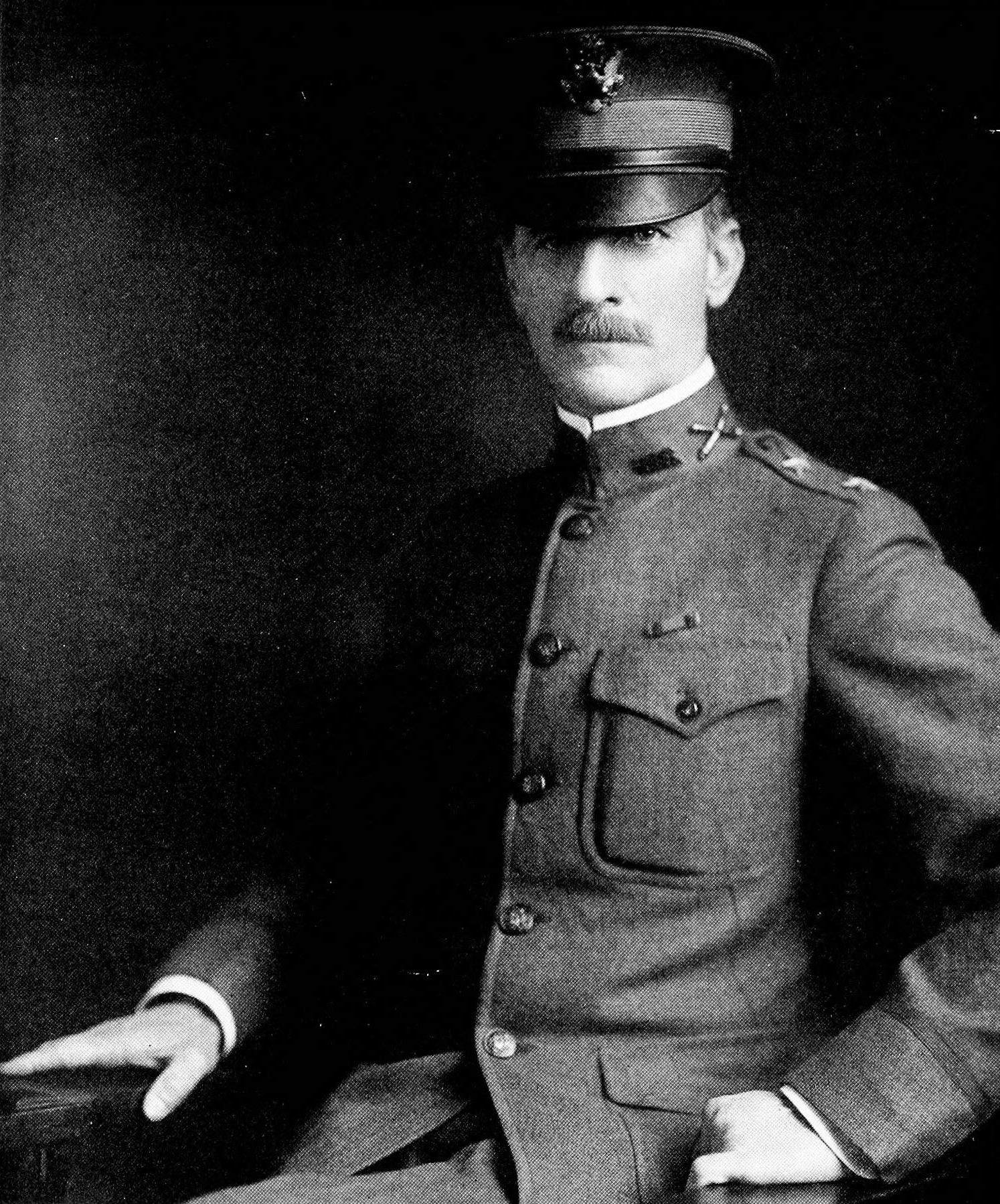
From 1920's F.A.C.O.T.S.: The Story of the Field Artillery Central Officers Training School, Camp Zachary Taylor, Kentucky

After the war, Snow continued to serve as the chief of field artillery, and the position was codified by law in 1920. He served until retiring in 1927, and oversaw the artillery branch's postwar reorganization, including the beginning of testing and experimentation to determine how to transition from horse drawn equipment to mechanized, and modernize processes for directing and controlling indirect fire to improve speed and accuracy.

== Retirement and death ==
After retiring in 1927, Snow resided in Washington, D.C., and Blue Ridge Summit, Pennsylvania. In 1940, Snow published a memoir, Signposts of Experience, which was reissued in 2014. He died in Washington on February 27, 1947, and was buried at Arlington National Cemetery, Section South, Site 3953.

== Awards ==
Snow was a recipient of the U.S. Army Distinguished Service Medal for his World War I service. He also received the British Order of the Bath (Companion) and the French Legion of Honor (Commander). The citation for his Army DSM reads:

The President of the United States of America, authorized by Act of Congress, July 9, 1918, takes pleasure in presenting the Army Distinguished Service Medal to Major General William Josiah Snow, United States Army, for exceptionally meritorious and distinguished services to the Government of the United States, in a duty of great responsibility during World War I, in planning and executing those measures responsible for the efficiency of the Field Artillery during the war.

In 1919, Snow received the honorary degree of LL.D. from Yale University.

== Family ==
In 1892, Snow married Isabel O'Hear Locke (1872–1944) of Atlanta, Georgia. They were the parents of a son, William Arthur Snow (1894–1940), who was also a graduate of West Point. William A. Snow was a World War I veteran who attained the rank of lieutenant colonel as an engineer officer, and was a recipient of the Distinguished Service Cross and other decorations to recognize his wartime heroism.

Snow was survived by his daughter in law, Margaret Payne Snow and two grandchildren, Margaret and William. Margaret Snow (1922–2011) was a teacher and the wife of Dr. John H. Hill (died 1980) and General Melville B. Coburn (died 1992). William J. Snow II (1923–2011) was a 1945 graduate of West Point and a veteran of the United States Air Force who went on to a career as an Episcopal clergyman.

== Sources ==
=== Internet ===
- "Memorial, William J. Snow 1890". westpointaog.org. West Point, NY: West Point Association of Graduates. 1947. Archived from the original on 2017-03-24.
- "Memorial, William J. Snow II 1945". westpointaog.org. West Point, NY: West Point Association of Graduates. 2011.
- "Obituary, Margaret Payne Snow Coburn, 1922-2011". Legacy.com. Norfolk, VA: The Virginian-Pilot. November 16, 2011.
- "Burial Record, William Josiah Snow (1868-1947)". Arlington National Cemetery. Arlington, VA: United States Department of the Army.

=== Books ===
- Cullum, George W.; Robinson, Wirt (1920). Biographical Register of the Officers and Graduates of the United States Military Academy. Vol. Supplement, Volume VI-A, 1910–1920. Saginaw, MI: Seeman & Peters.
- Davis, Henry Blaine Jr. (1998). Generals in Khaki. Raleigh, NC: Pentland Press. ISBN 978-1-57197-088-6.
- Snow, William J. (2014). Signposts of Experience. North Charleston, SC: CreateSpace. ISBN 978-1-4996-7377-7.

=== Magazines ===
- Oviatt, Edwin (July 3, 1919). "A Notable Group of 1919 Honorary Degree Men". Yale Alumni Weekly. New Haven, CT: Yale Publishing Association, Inc.

Military offices
Preceded by Edward McGlachlin Jr.	Commandant of the United States Army Field Artillery School; 1917	Succeeded by Adrian S. Fleming
