= Herbert Deakyne =

United States Army general

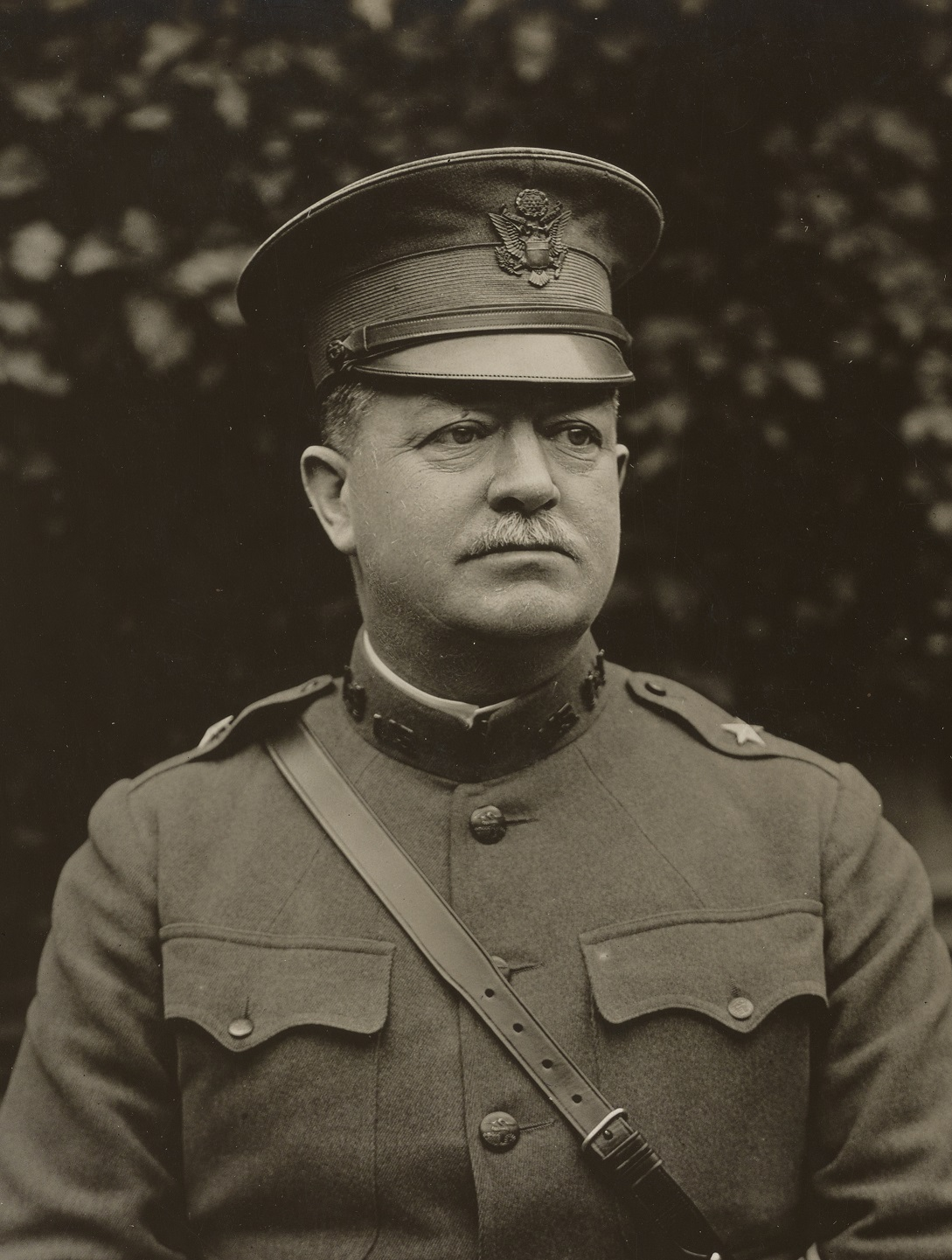
- Brig. General Herbert Deakyne in 1919
- Born: December 29, 1867; Deakyneville, New Castle County, Delaware, U.S.
- Died: May 28, 1945 (aged 77); San Francisco, California, U.S.
- Burial place: Arlington National Cemetery
- Spouse: Sadie McKinnon Nickerson (m. 1899)
- Children: 2
- Military career
- Allegiance: United States
- Branch: United States Army
- Service years: 1890–1931
- Rank: Brigadier General
- Service number: 0-344
- Unit: Corps of Engineers
- Conflicts: World War I

Herbert Deakyne (December 29, 1867 – May 28, 1945) was a United States Army officer and engineer in the late 19th and early 20th centuries.

== Military career ==
Deakyne was born on December 29, 1867, in Deakyneville, Delaware, a location settled by his ancestors around 1700. he attended Delaware College for two years and afterwards attended the United States Military Academy for four years, graduating third in a class of 54 from the latter in 1890. Upon graduation, he was commissioned into the United States Army Corps of Engineers. His classmates included Colden Ruggles, Fred W. Sladen, Frank M. Caldwell, Clint C. Hearn, Daniel W. Ketcham, Edgar Jadwin, Francis Marshall, Harry H. Bandholtz, Henry D. Todd Jr., William C. Davis, George G. Gatley, William S. McNair and William J. Snow. All of these men would, like Deakyne himself, attain the rank of general officer.

Deakyne studied at the Engineering School of Application at Willets Point, Queens, from 1890 to 1893, and from 1893 to 1900, he worked as an army engineer in California, working on river, harbor, and fortification projects. He served on the California Debris Commission from 1897 to 1901. He served in Florida from 1901 to 1903, at Fort Leavenworth from 1903 to 1905, and in the Philippines from 1905 to 1907, and from August to November 1907, he served as chief engineering officer of the Philippine Division. From 1908 to 1912, Deakyne served in the Philadelphia area, and from 1912 to 1916, he did work on the Missouri River and tributaries. In 1916, he served in the office of the Army Corps of Engineers Chiefs of Engineers.

Graduating from the United States Army War College in 1917, Deakyne went on a tour of duty to France in August of that year, commanding the Tenth Railway Engineers in Saint-Nazaire until January 1918. From January to May 1918, he commanded the 11th Railway Engineers along the British front in the north of the country. Deakyne later served as the Director of Railways and Roads in Chaumont, Haute-Marne. He received a temporary promotion to brigadier general on October 13, 1918, and reverted to his permanent rank of lieutenant colonel on May 31, 1919.

After returning to the U.S., Deakyne served in New Orleans and later in San Francisco from 1920 to 1925. He served as an assistant to the Chief of Engineers from June 1926 to June 1930, and he served as the interim Chief of Engineers from August 7 to October 1, 1929. Having been promoted to brigadier general in 1926, Deakyne retired on December 31, 1931, after reaching the mandatory retirement age of 64.

Deakyne married Sadie MacKinnon Nickerson (April 12, 1874 – October 13, 1964) in 1899. They had two daughters. After his retirement, Deakyne and his wife lived at her family's estate on Humboldt Bay near Samoa, California and then in San Francisco. He died in the Letterman General Hospital at the Presidio of San Francisco on May 28, 1945. Deakyne and his wife are buried at Arlington National Cemetery.

== Bibliography ==
- Davis, Henry Blaine Jr. (1998). Generals in Khaki. Raleigh, North Carolina: Pentland Press. ISBN 1571970886. OCLC 40298151.
- Marquis Who's Who (1975). Who Was Who In American History – The Military. Chicago, Illinois: Marquis Who's Who. ISBN 0837932017.
