= Jadwin =

Jadwin is a surname. Notable people with the surname include:

- Cornelius Jadwin (1896–1982), American equestrian
- Cornelius C. Jadwin (1835–1913), American politician
- Edgar Jadwin (1865–1931), United States Army general

== See also ==
- Jadwin, Missouri, is an unincorporated community in southern Dent County, Missouri, United States
- Jadwin Gymnasium, is a multi-purpose arena at Princeton University in Princeton, New Jersey
