= Francis Marshall (United States Army officer) =

Brigadier General of the United States Army

Francis Cutler Marshall
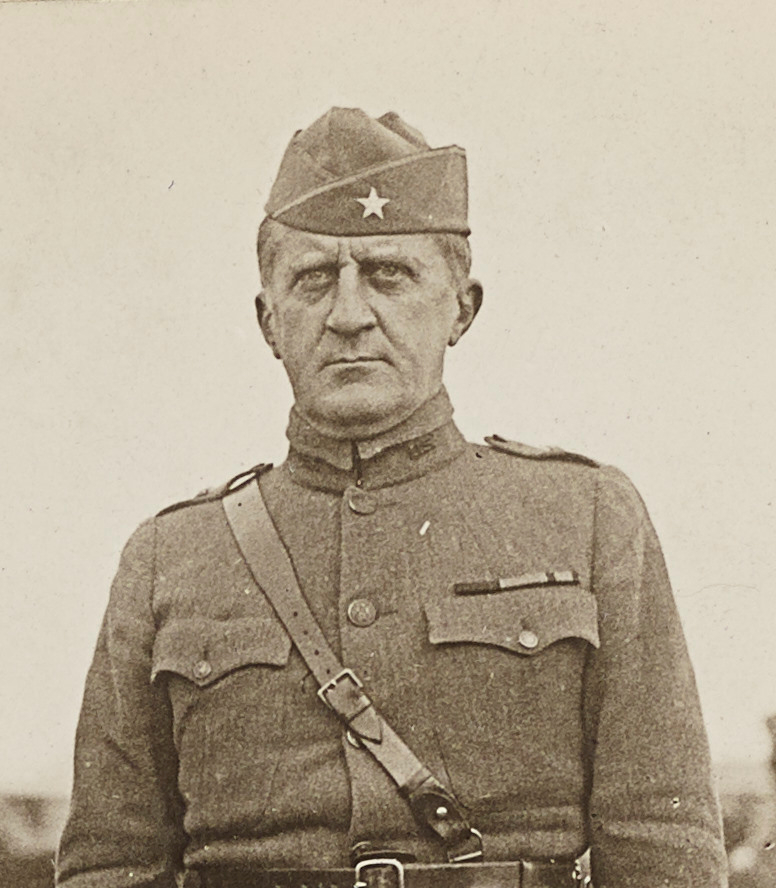
- Brigadier General Francis C. Marshall, 1st Division, Meuse 1918.
- Born: March 26, 1867; Galena, Illinois, U.S.
- Died: December 7, 1922 (aged 55); Cuyamaca Mountains, California, U.S.
- Military career
- Allegiance: United States
- Branch: United States Army
- Service years: 1890–1922
- Rank: Brigadier General
- Service number: 0-277
- Commands: 2nd Brigade
- Conflicts: American Indian Wars; Sioux Wars; Boxer Rebellion; China Relief Expedition; Philippine-American War; World War I; Meuse-Argonne Offensive; Will Lockett race riots
- Awards: Army Distinguished Service Medal

Francis Cutler Marshall (26 March 1867 – 7 December 1922) was a brigadier general in the United States Army during World War I. He served as commanding officer of the 2nd Infantry Brigade, 1st Infantry Division. He was awarded the Army Distinguished Service Medal for his achievements in this command during the Meuse-Argonne Offensive.

== Early life and education ==
Marshall was born in Galena, Illinois, on 26 March 1867. He attended the United States Military Academy at West Point and graduated with the Class of 1890. His classmates there included Colden Ruggles, Fred W. Sladen, Frank M. Caldwell, Clint C. Hearn, Daniel W. Ketcham, Edgar Jadwin, William J. Snow, Harry H. Bandholtz, Henry D. Todd Jr., William C. Davis, George G. Gatley, William S. McNair and Herbert Deakyne. All of these men would, like Marshall himself, attain the rank of general officer.

== Career ==
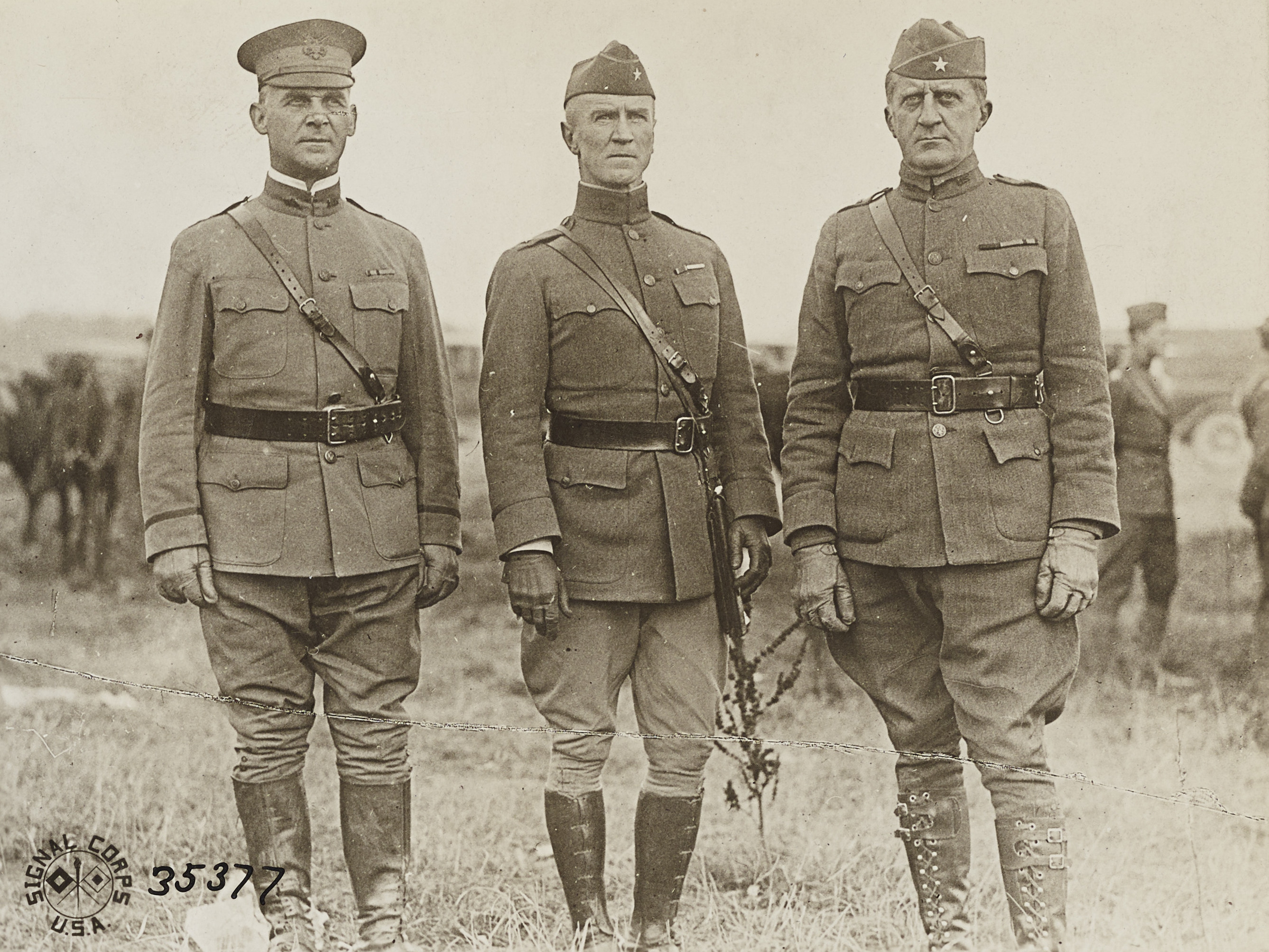
From left to right: Major General Charles P. Summerall, commanding V Corps, Brigadier General Frank Parker, commanding the 1st Division, Brigadier General Francis C. Marshall, commanding the 2nd Brigade, 1st Division, France, October 31, 1918.

In 1901, Francis Marshall served as a captain with the 15th Cavalry. He later was stationed at Fort Sheridan, Illinois, until 31 May 1911.

In World War I, Francis Marshall was stationed in France after the American entry into World War I in 1917. He won the Distinguished Service Medal and the Croix de Guerre and got a temporary promotion to the rank of brigadier general. In 1920 he returned to his original rank of colonel.

On February 9, 1920, Kentucky Governor Edwin P. Morrow called the Federal government to send Federal troops to Lexington, Kentucky, because of the ongoing tense situations in the city. The Kentucky Army National Guard and Lexington Police Department had already killed six people, while holding back a crowd from advancing on a courthouse to lynch Will Lockett, an African-American serial killer who was on trial for murdering 10-year-old white girl Geneva Hardman. Later that afternoon, Marshall arrived to Lexington on special trains with 1,200 Army soldiers under his command. He imposed martial law in the city. The day after the shootings, Marshall declared, "This community has set a fine example against lawlessness and Bolshevism and has killed several of its own citizens in upholding law and order."

To prevent more lynchers from organizing, Marshall enacted citywide censorship. He ordered local telephone and telegraph companies to shut down all communication within 100 miles from Lexington. He banned any messages from leaving the city. Marshall also organized 12 patrols to guard certain areas of the county. Those areas included the local armory, the home of the judge, the home of the head of the county, and the black districts of Lexington.

Marshall also attempted to have certain members of the crowd indicted for inciting the riot. A report asserted that most of them were curious bystanders, but "there were undoubtedly among the crowd various men, mostly from other counties than Fayette, intent on lynching Lockett." Marshall handpicked jurors whom he knew would have no trouble convicting the rioters. However, the grand jury was discarded on the grounds that the indictments would be thrown out on constitutional grounds. A second grand jury was convened. It had secured testimony against certain individuals guilty of inciting the crowd. However, on February 26, 1920, they concluded that handing down indictments with subsequent trials would "only tend to aggravate an already tense situation, engender more passion and bitter feelings in the County and State, and keep alive such as now exists."

== Awards ==
His Distinguished Service Medal citation reads:

The President of the United States of America, authorized by Act of Congress, July 9, 1918, takes pleasure in presenting the Army Distinguished Service Medal to Brigadier General Francis C. Marshall, United States Army, for exceptionally meritorious and distinguished services to the Government of the United States, in a duty of great responsibility during World War I. In Command of the 2d Infantry Brigade, 1st Division, during the Meuse-Argonne offensive from 20 October to 11 November 1918, when by his energy, professional skill, and his pronounced qualities of leadership, especially in the attack of the 1st Division on the line of the Meuse on 6 November 1918, and the subsequent operations against Sedan on 6 to 7 November 1918, General Marshall contributed in large measure to the success of his Division.

== Personal life ==
His official residence was listed as Darlington, Wisconsin.

== Death and legacy ==
Marshall, now assistant chief of cavalry, left Rockwell Field on an inspection tour with his pilot Charles F. Webber on December 7, 1922, in a DeHaviland DH4B heading for Tucson. The wreck of the aircraft and the human remains of its crew were found 5 months later in the Cuyamaca Mountains. It was assumed that the pilot lost orientation in heavy fog, touched the treetops and crashed.

The following year, the new Marshall Army Airfield at Fort Riley, Kansas, was named in his honor and a monument was erected at the crash site on the Cuyamaca Mountains Japacha Ridge.
