= Edgar Jadwin =

United States Army general (1865–1931)

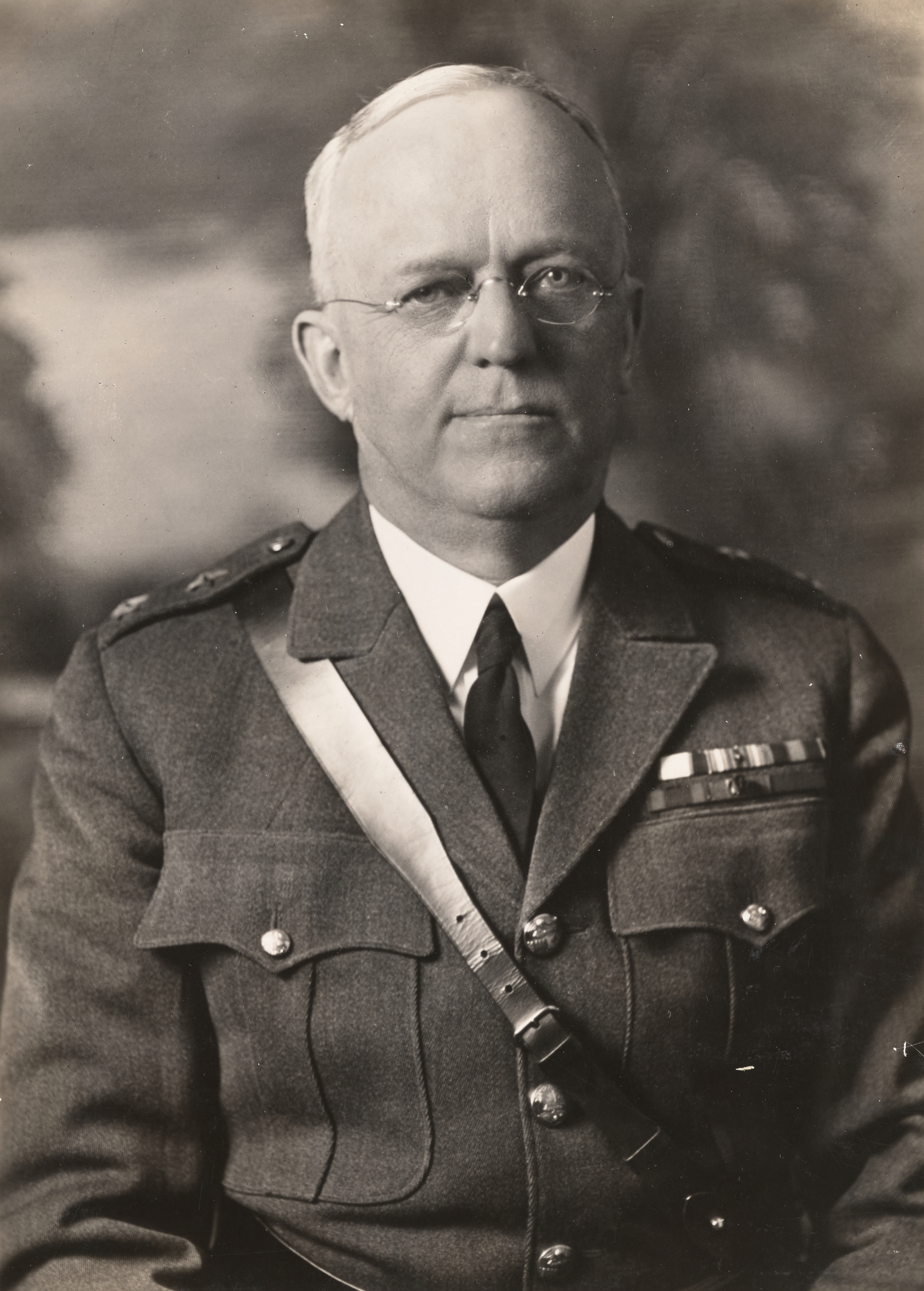
- Major General Edgar Jadwin, Chief of Engineers 1926–1929
- Born: August 7, 1865; Honesdale, Pennsylvania, U.S.
- Died: March 2, 1931 (aged 65); Panama Canal Zone
- Burial place: Arlington National Cemetery, Virginia
- Children: Cornelius Comegys Jadwin II, Charlotte Jadwin Hearn
- Military career
- Allegiance: United States
- Branch: United States Army
- Service years: 1890–1929
- Rank: Lieutenant General
- Commands: Chief of Engineers; Division of Construction and Forestry, AEF; 15th Engineers
- Wars: Spanish–American War; World War I
- Awards: Distinguished Service Medal

Edgar Jadwin, C.E. (August 7, 1865 – March 2, 1931) was a U.S. Army officer who fought in the Spanish–American War and World War I, before serving as Chief of Engineers from 1926 to 1929.

== Early life ==
Jadwin was born in Honesdale, Pennsylvania on August 7, 1865, as the son of Cornelius Comegys Jadwin, and graduated first in the United States Military Academy class of 1890. He was commissioned in the U.S. Army Corps of Engineers. His classmates included Colden Ruggles, Fred W. Sladen, Frank M. Caldwell, Clint C. Hearn, Daniel W. Ketcham, Herbert Deakyne, Francis Marshall, Harry H. Bandholtz, Henry D. Todd Jr., William C. Davis, George G. Gatley, William S. McNair and William J. Snow. All of these men would, like Jadwin himself, attain the rank of general officer.

His son, Olympic equestrian Cornelius Comegys Jadwin II, was born in 1896.

== Military career ==
After commissioning, Jadwin served with various engineer units between 1891 and 1895. He then fought during the Spanish–American War.

After serving as district engineer at the expanding ports of Los Angeles and Galveston, he was selected by Brigadier General George W. Goethals as an assistant in the construction of the Panama Canal, on which he worked from 1907 to 1911. Jadwin served in 1911–1916 in the Office of the Chief of Engineers focusing on bridge and road matters. He was promoted to lieutenant colonel on October 12, 1913.

He was promoted to colonel in the National Army on July 6, 1917, exactly three months after the American entry into World War I. He received a brevet to brigadier general on December 17, 1917. Upon the country's entry into World War I, he recruited the 15th Engineers, a railway construction regiment, and led it to France to join the American Expeditionary Forces (AEF). He directed American construction and forestry work there for a year and received the Army Distinguished Service Medal, the citation for which reads:

The President of the United States of America, authorized by Act of Congress, July 9, 1918, takes pleasure in presenting the Army Distinguished Service Medal to Brigadier General Edgar Jadwin, United States Army, for exceptionally meritorious and distinguished services to the Government of the United States, in a duty of great responsibility during World War I. As Commanding Officer of the 15th Engineers, General Jadwin inaugurated the important project at Gievres. Later, in charge of the Division of Construction and Forestry, he brought to this important task a splendidly trained mind and exceptionally high skill. His breadth of vision and sound judgment influenced greatly the successful completion of many vast construction projects undertaken by the American Expeditionary Forces.

At the conclusion of the war, President Woodrow Wilson appointed Jadwin to investigate conditions in Poland in 1919. This assignment was followed by an observer assignment in Ukraine. From 1922 to 1924, Jadwin headed the Corps' Charleston District and Southeast Division. He then served two years as Assistant Chief of Engineers. As Chief of Engineers he sponsored the plan for Mississippi River flood control that was adopted by the United States Congress in May 1928. Jadwin retired as a lieutenant general on August 7, 1929.

== Dredge Jadwin ==
The Vicksburg, Mississippi district of the Army Corps Of Engineers operates a large inland river dredge named after Edgar Jadwin. The dredge Jadwin is used mainly in the deep draft ship crossings of the Lower Mississippi River between Baton Rouge and New Orleans to keep a federally mandated channel depth of no less than 48 feet and width of 500 feet. The Jadwin also operates on the Lower Mississippi River above Baton Rouge to maintain the shallow draft channel of 9 feet deep by 300 feet wide. The dredge is one of 3 Corps owned dredges classified as a "dustpan" dredge, due to the shape of the suction/cutting head which resembles a dustpan.

== Dates of rank ==
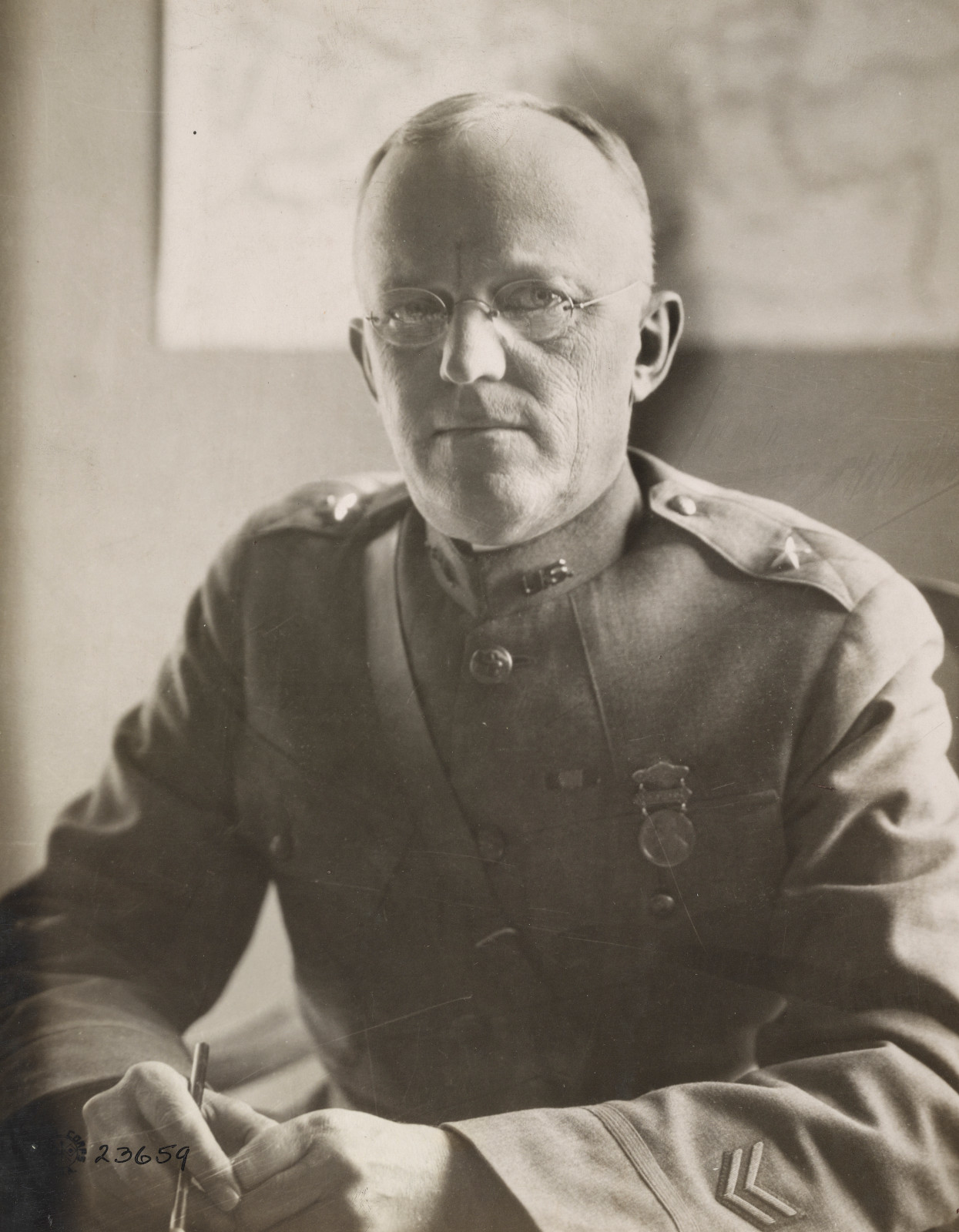
Edgar Jadwin as brigadier general of the National Army in 1918

Insignia	Rank	Component	Date
None	Cadet	United States Military Academy	1 July 1886
None in 1890	Second Lieutenant	Regular Army	12 June 1890
	First Lieutenant	Regular Army	10 May 1895
	Major	Volunteers	20 June 1898
	Lieutenant Colonel	Volunteers	15 September 1898
	First Lieutenant	Regular Army	17 May 1899
	Captain	Regular Army	29 January 1900
	Major	Regular Army	26 September 1906
	Lieutenant Colonel	Regular Army	12 October 1913
	Colonel	National Army	6 July 1917
	Brigadier General	National Army	17 December 1917
	Colonel	Regular Army	10 September 1919 (Discharged from National Army on 1 November 1919.)
	Brigadier General	Regular Army	19 June 1924
	Major General	Regular Army	27 June 1926
	Lieutenant General	Retired List	7 August 1929

== Awards and honors ==
Jadwin received the Army Distinguished Service Medal, the Companion Order of the Bath from Great Britain, and the Commander in the Legion of Honour from France.

== Death and legacy ==
He died in Gorgas Hospital in the Panama Canal Zone on March 2, 1931, and was buried at Arlington National Cemetery, in Arlington, Virginia.

Military offices
Preceded by Harry Taylor	Chief of Engineers; 1926–1929	Succeeded by Lytle Brown
