= Madison Barracks =

- U.S. National Register of Historic Places
- U.S. Historic district
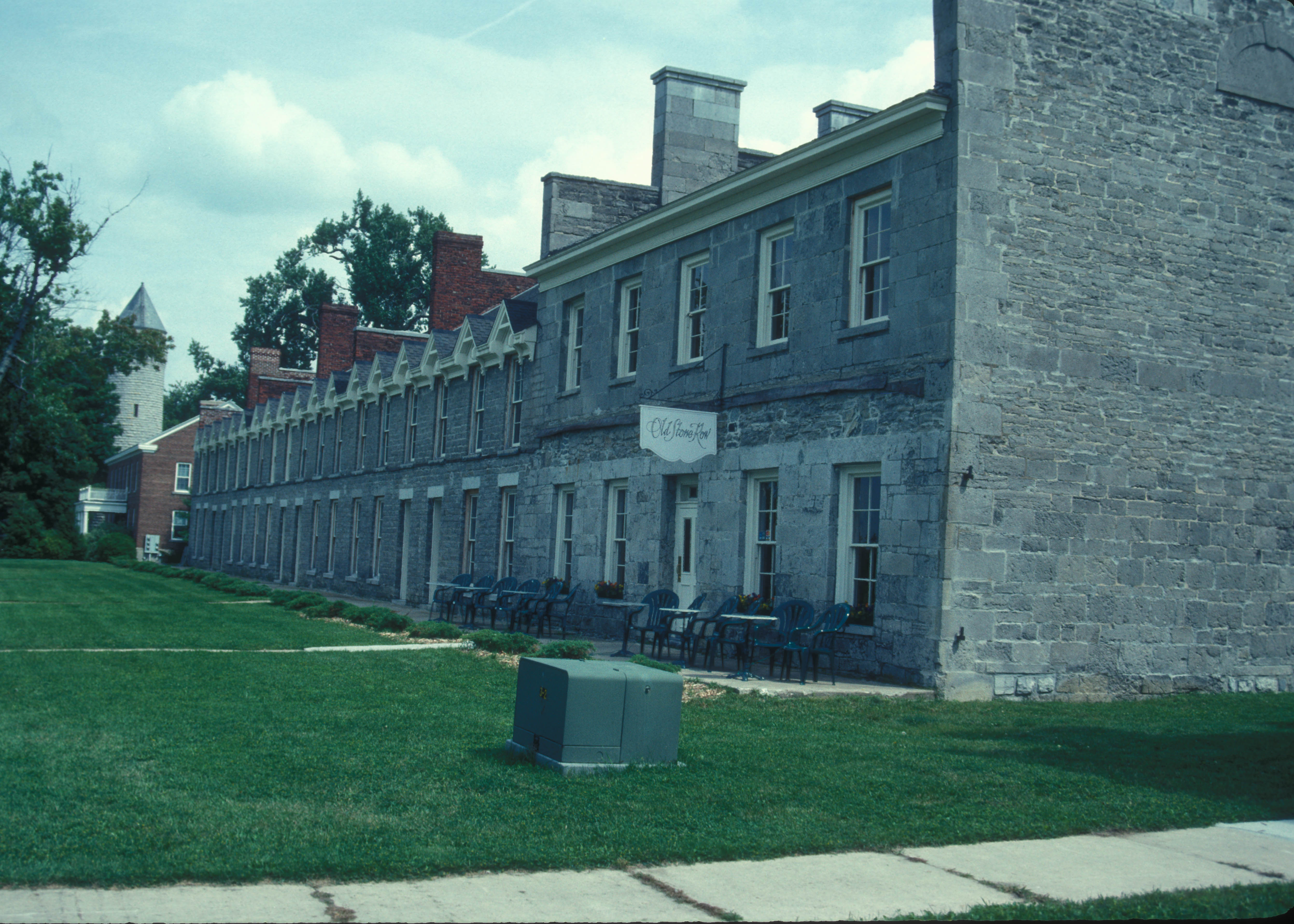

- Location within New York Location within the United States
- Location: Military Rd., Sackets Harbor, New York
- Coordinates: 43°57′10″N 76°6′35″W
- Area: 113 acres (46 ha)
- Built: 1816
- Architect: Smith, William
- NRHP reference No.: 74001246
- Added to NRHP: November 21, 1974

Madison Barracks was a military installation established in 1813 or 1815 at Sackets Harbor that was built for occupation by 600 U.S. troops, a few years after the War of 1812. It was named for James Madison who had just completed his presidency in 1817. Construction began under the name Fort Pike. The facility is a National Historic Landmark and a historic district located in Jefferson County, New York. The district includes 86 contributing buildings and two contributing structures. It includes the stone hospital, bakery, several warehouses known as "Stone Row," a stone water tower, and a series of brick buildings constructed in the 1890s as officers quarters, barracks, mess hall, and weapons storage and repair building.

Madison Barracks was used as a Citizens' Military Training Camp between the world wars.

Madison Barracks was the U.S. Army's primary post in upstate New York until Pine Camp (later renamed Fort Drum) was opened in 1908. Madison Barracks remained an active military installation through the end of World War II, to 1947.

General Mark W. Clark, a senior commander during World War II, was born at Madison Barracks in 1896 while his father Charles Carr Clark was stationed there.

The grounds and remaining buildings of Madison Barracks are now part of a combined residential and business development. The Madison Barracks site was listed on the National Register of Historic Places in 1974.

== Military Cemetery at Sackets Harbor ==
Military Cemetery at Sackets Harbor or Military Cemetery is located south of the barracks at Dodge Avenue and Spencer Drive since 1909. It is the resting place for Zebulon Pike.

== Gallery ==
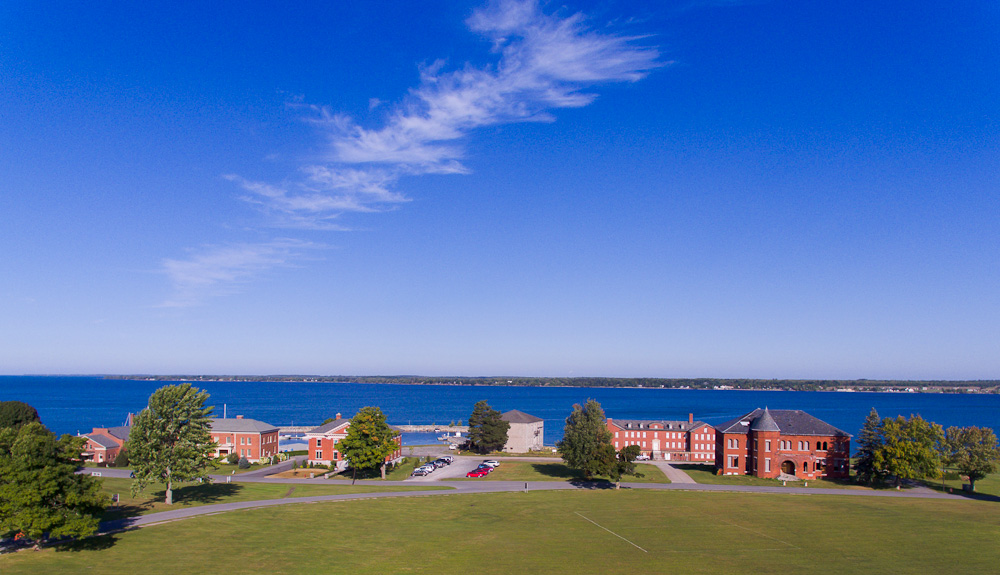

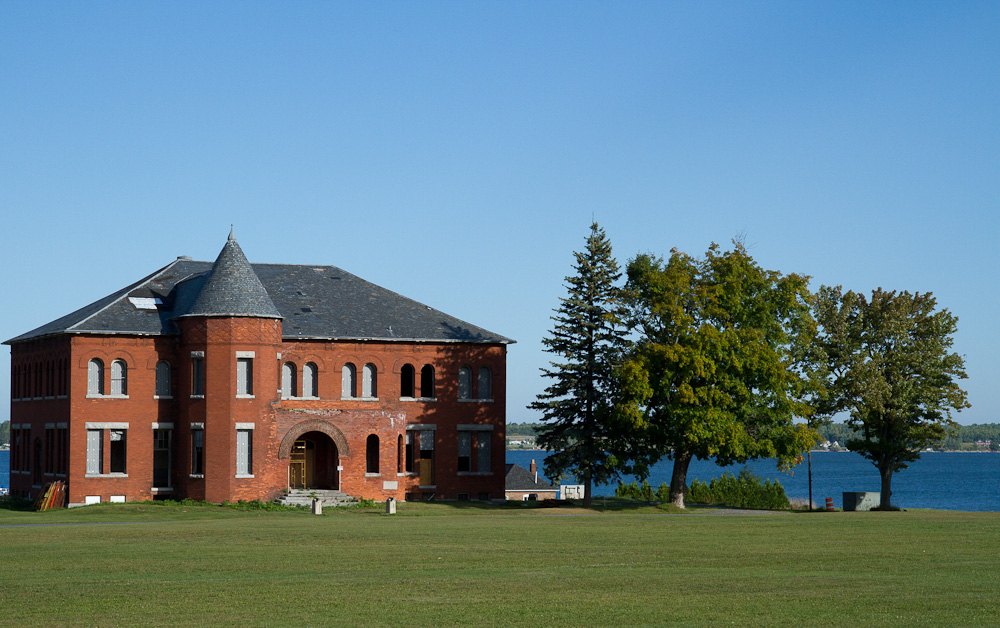

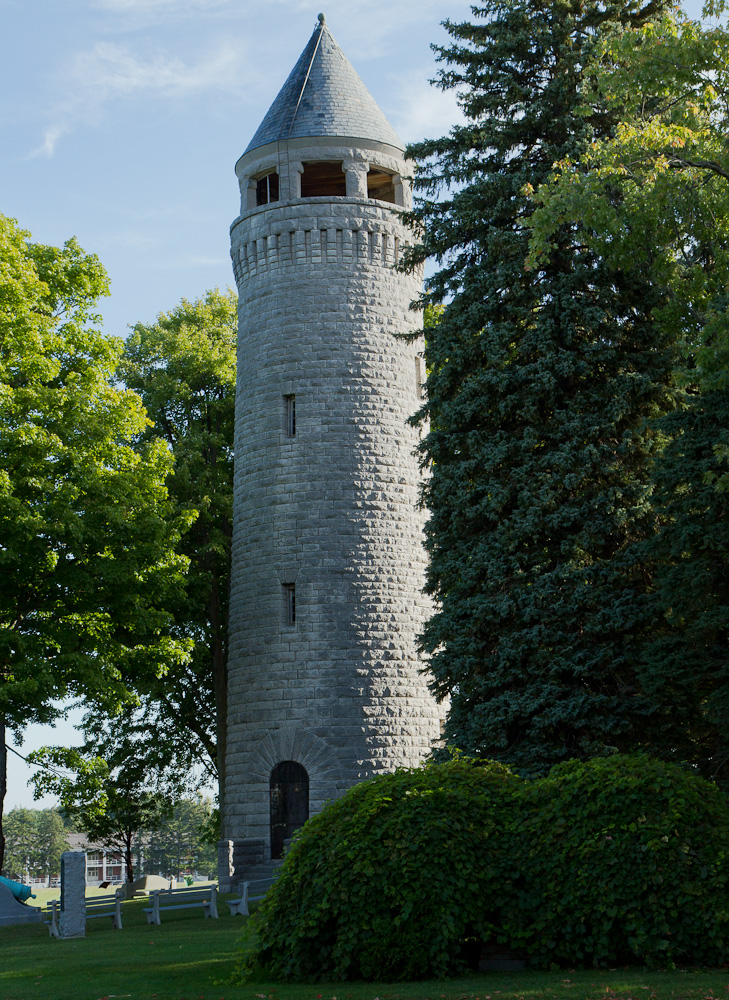

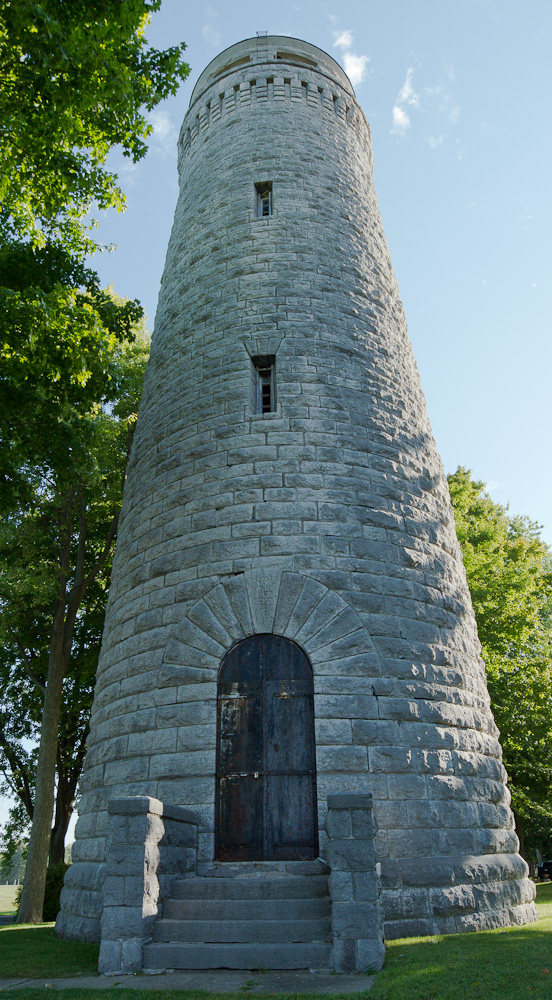
