= Miklós Ligeti =

Hungarian sculptor and artist

Miklós Ligeti (May 1, 1871 – December 10, 1944) was a Hungarian sculptor and artist. His sculptural style integrated elements of impressionism and realism.

== Early life and education ==
Miklós Ligeti was born on May 1, 1871 in Pest.

At first a pupil of Alajos Stróbl in Budapest, Ligeti later studied in Vienna, Austria.

== Career ==
In 1903 Ligeti created a statue of Anonymus, the unknown chronicler at the court of King Béla III (r 1172–96), known as Anonymous, within Budapest City Park.

Ligeti was also the sculptor of a statue honoring US Army Major General Harry Hill Bandholtz, for his service to Hungary after World War I. It was installed at the US Embassy in 1936, but was later removed by the communist government after World War II. It was replaced in 1989. It has been moved again, to Freedom Park, across from the US Embassy.

== Other activities ==
Ligeti was president of the Hungarian Society of Applied Arts.

== Death ==
Ligeti died in Budapest on December 10, 1944.

== Statues ==
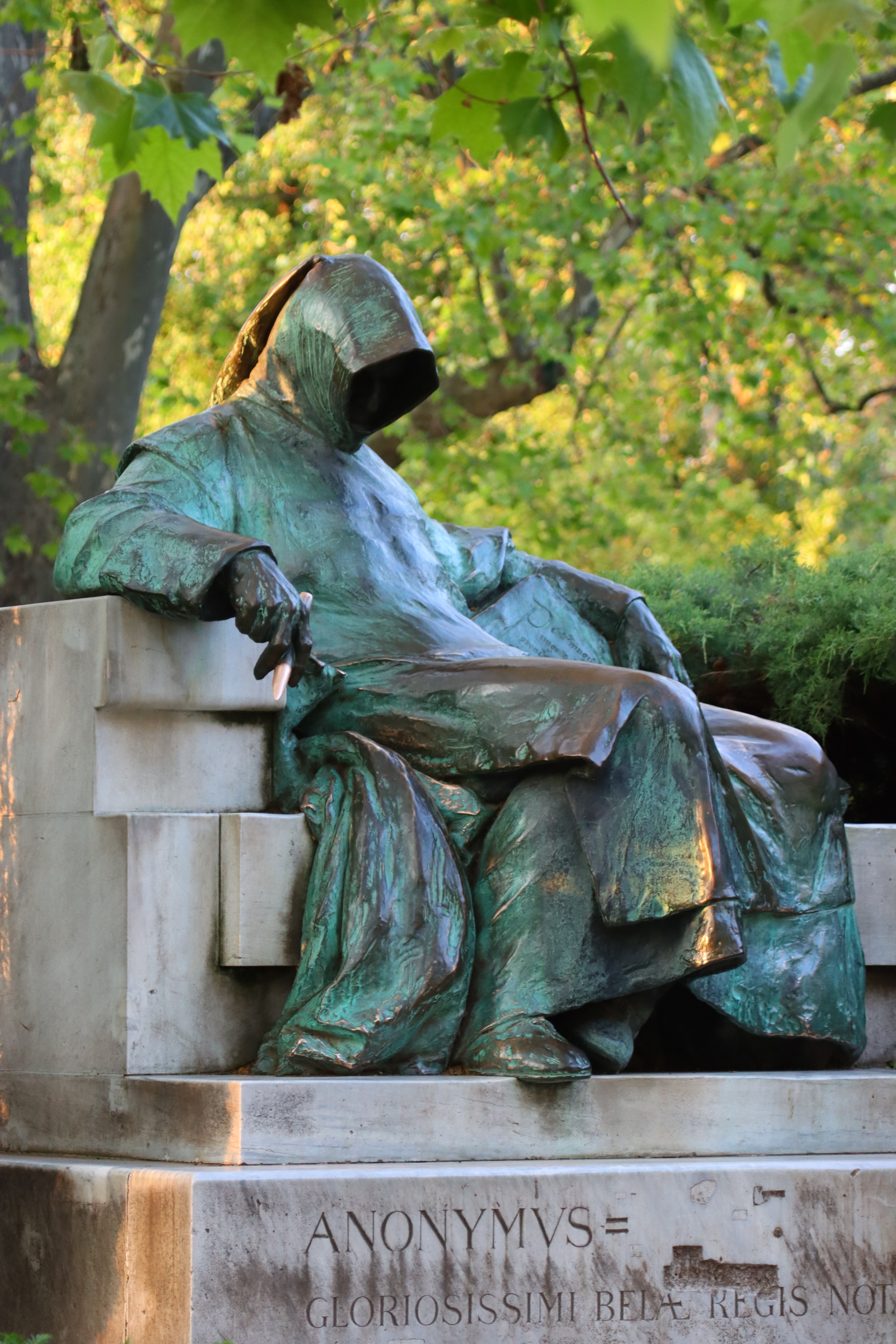
Anonymus statue in City Park, Budapest (1903)

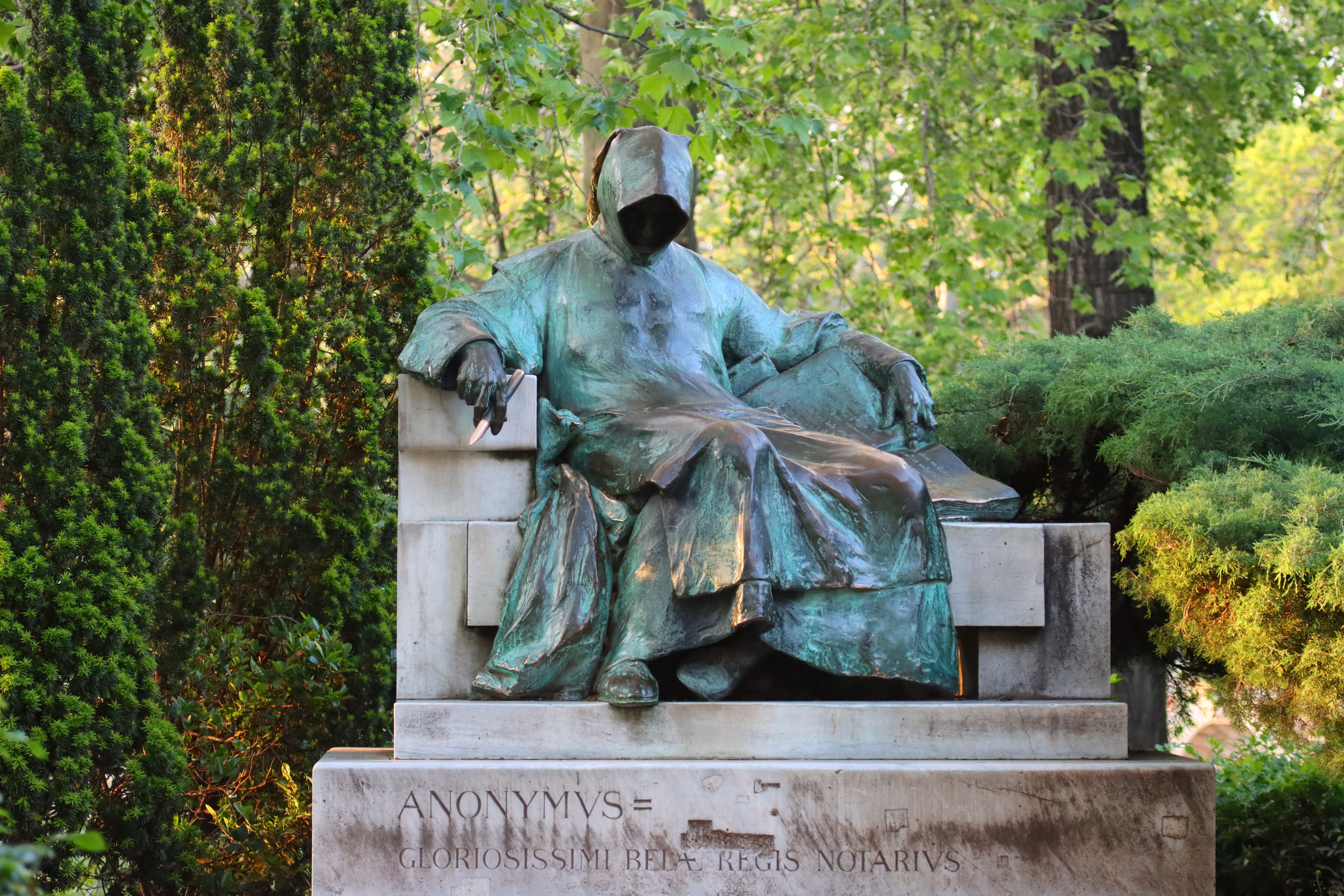
Anonymus statue in City Park, Budapest (1903)

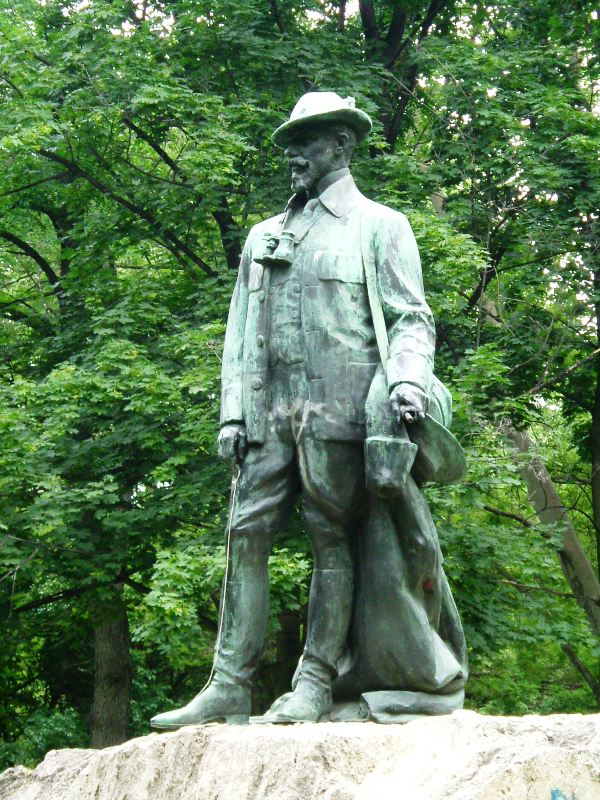
Rudolf, Crown Prince of Austria, Budapest (1908)

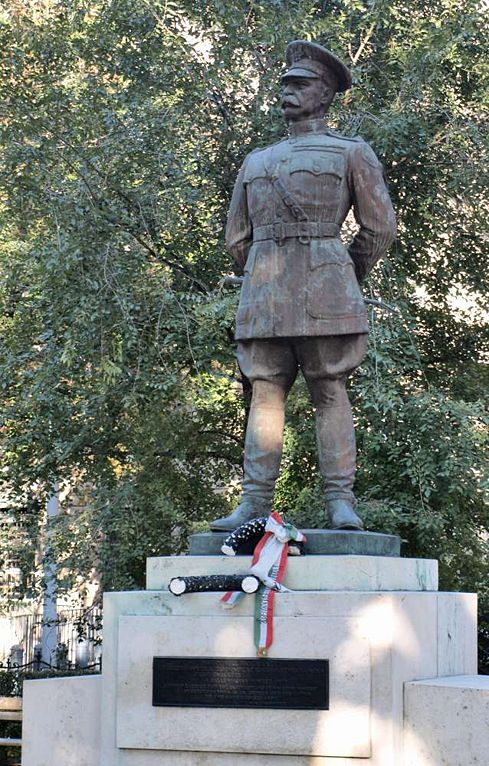
Harry Hill Bandholtz, Budapest (1936)
