= Cornelius Jadwin =

American equestrian (1896–1982)

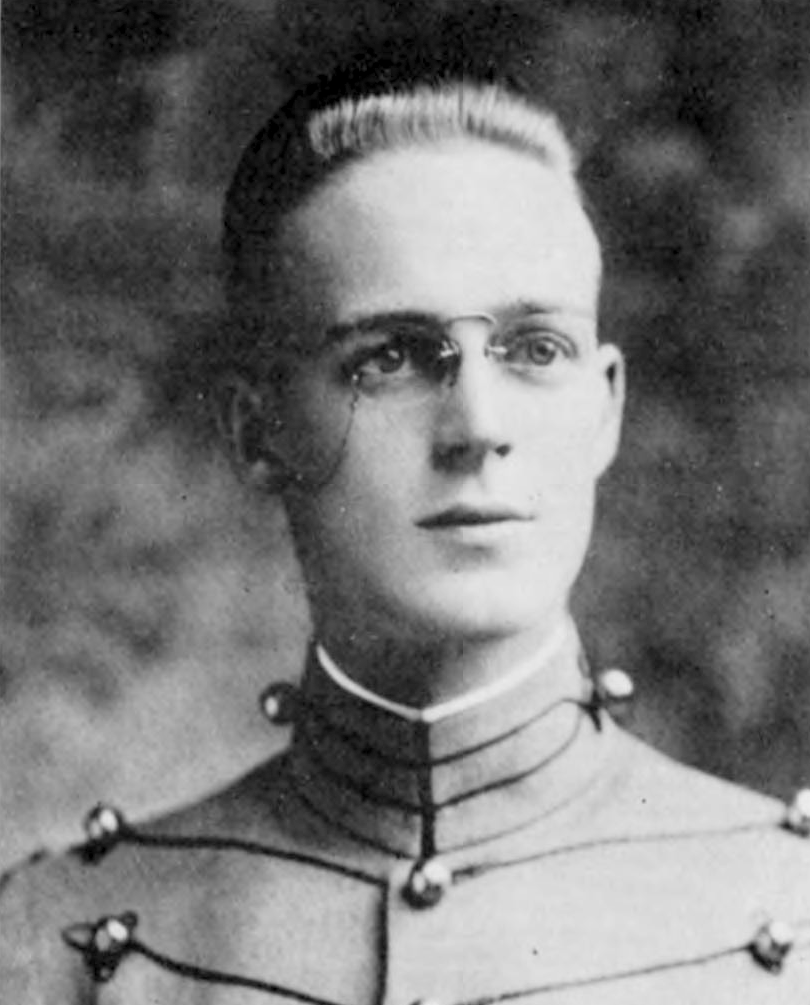
- At West Point in 1919

Personal information
- Born: March 22, 1896 Wilmington, North Carolina, United States
- Died: March 3, 1982 (aged 85) Warrenton, Virginia, United States
- Parent: Edgar Jadwin (father)

Sport
- Sport: Equestrian

Cornelius Comegys Jadwin II (March 22, 1896 – March 3, 1982) was an American equestrian. He competed in two events at the 1936 Summer Olympics.

== Biography ==
Cornelius Jadwin was born in Wilmington, North Carolina on March 22, 1896, the son of Army officer Edgar Jadwin.

He attended the United States Military Academy at West Point, and graduated in 1919.

He died in Warrenton, Virginia on March 3, 1982.
