= George Davis Moore =

United States Army general

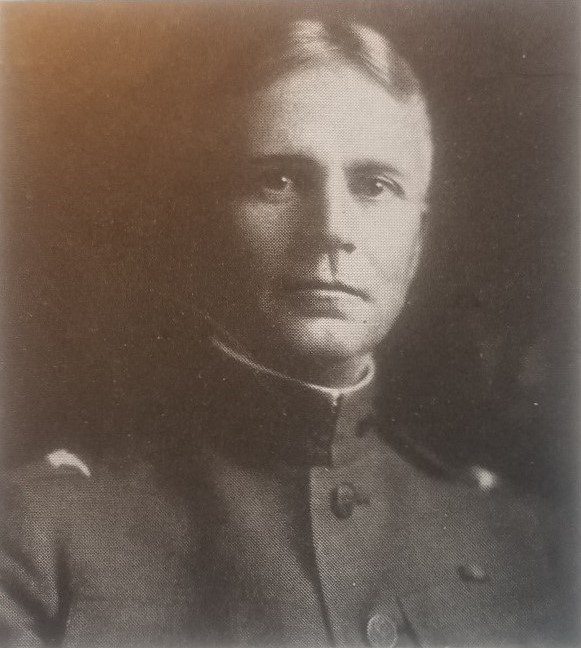
- Moore as a colonel
- Born: September 18, 1867; Springfield, Illinois
- Died: December 12, 1947 (aged 80) San Diego, California
- Allegiance: United States
- Branch: United States Army
- Service years: 1890–1931
- Rank: Brigadier General
- Conflicts: Spanish–American War; Philippine–American War; World War I

George Davis Moore (September 19, 1867 – December 12, 1947) was an American brigadier general during World War I.

== Early life and education ==
George Davis Moore was born on September 19, 1867, in Springfield, Illinois. His family later moved to Danville, Illinois, where he graduated from Danville High School. Moore then enrolled at the Massachusetts Institute of Technology. After completing his freshman year, he was appointed to the U.S. Military Academy at West Point by Congressman Joe Cannon, graduating, 43rd in a class of 54, with the class of 1890.

== Career ==
Moore accepted a commission in the 18th Infantry.

During the Spanish-American War, he served as a major with the Fifth Missouri Infantry.

Moore was sent to the Philippines with the 23rd Infantry in March 1899. He returned there with the 20th Infantry in December 1903.

Moore was sent to Fort Leavenworth, Kansas in September 1907, becoming a distinguished graduate of the School of the Line in 1908 and then graduating from the Army Staff College in 1909. He subsequently graduated from the United States Army War College in 1911. Moore taught military arts at the School of the Line from September 1912 to May 1914.

He went to France with the American Expeditionary Force in March 1918.

Moore was promoted to brigadier general on October 1, 1918. He was the commanding general of the 169th Infantry Brigade, and participated in engagements on the Hindenburg Line, at Bellicourt and Nauroy, at Brancourt, Prémont, Bassigny, Vaux-Andigny, Saint-Souplet, Selle River, and Mazinghem.

Moore returned to Camp Upton, New York, and commanded the 152nd Depot Brigade until May 15, 1919, when his rank was reduced back to colonel.

Moore served as senior inspector-instructor with the New York National Guard from May 1919 to August 1922. He was chief of staff of the 94th Division at Boston, Massachusetts from November 1929 to May 1930.

Moore retired as a brigadier general on September 30, 1931, having reached the mandatory retirement age of sixty-four. He then moved to San Diego, California.

== Death ==
Moore died on December 12, 1947, at the U.S. Naval Hospital in San Diego. He was interred at Fort Rosecrans National Cemetery a week later.
