= Daniel Warren Ketcham =

United States Army general

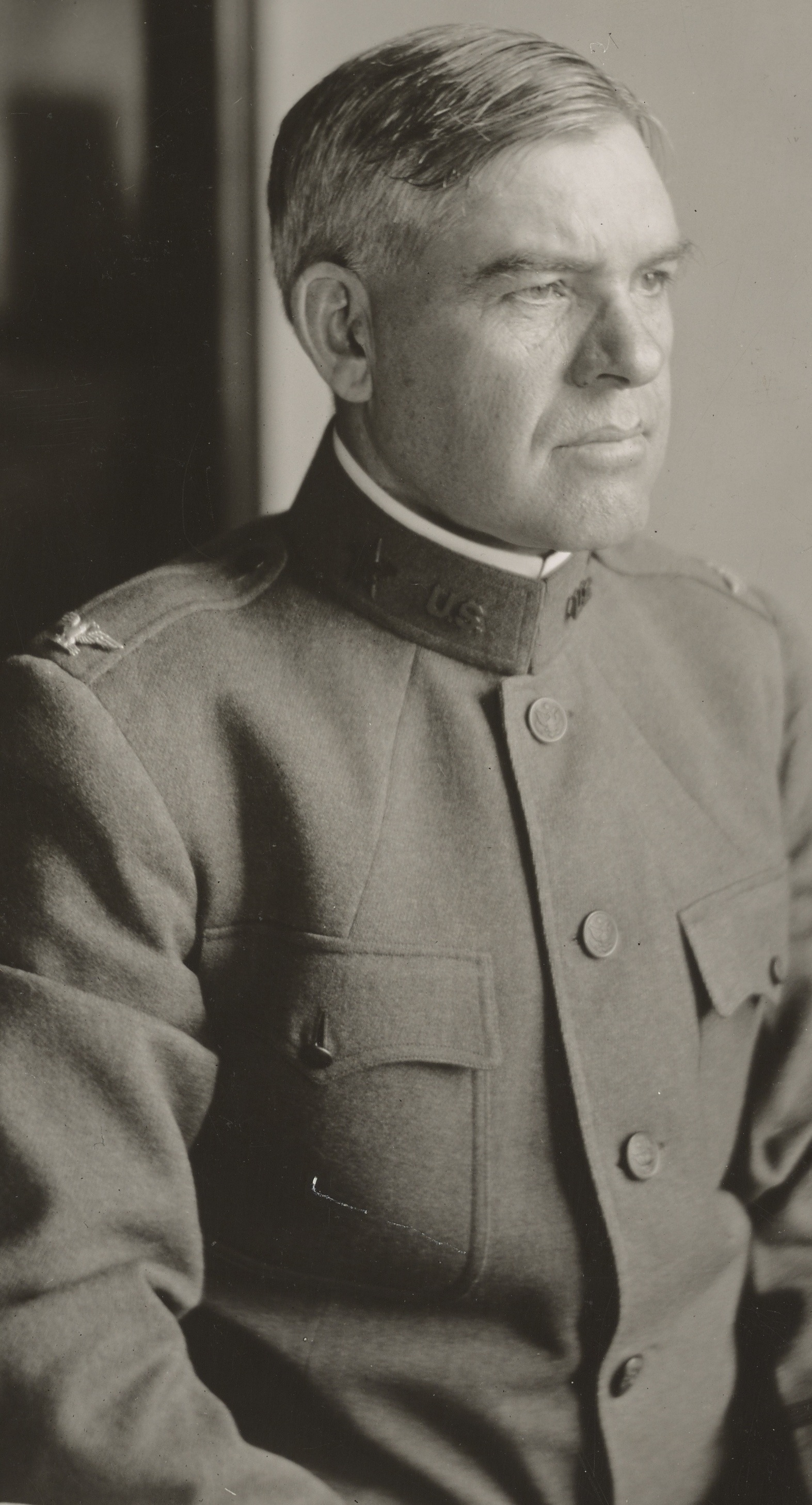
- May 1918 photo of Ketcham as a colonel
- Born: May 1, 1867; Madison Township, Daviess County, Indiana, US
- Died: July 19, 1935 (aged 68); Indianapolis, Indiana, US
- Burial place: Burns City Cemetery, Burns City, Indiana, US
- Military career
- Branch: United States Army
- Service years: 1890–1919
- Rank: Brigadier General
- Service number: 0-13377
- Units: US Army Field Artillery Branch; US Army Coast Artillery Corps
- Commands: Battery K, 6th Artillery; 67th Coast Artillery Company; 60th Coast Artillery Company; Fort Wint; Fort Warren; Coast Defenses of Delaware Bay; Citizens' Military Training Camp, Chickamauga Park; Citizens' Military Training Camp, Plattsburgh Barracks; Fort Story; 34th Coast Artillery Brigade; Camp Taylor
- Wars: Spanish–American War; Philippine–American War; World War I

Daniel Warren Ketcham (1 May 1867 – 19 July 1935) was an American artillery officer who served with the U.S. Army.

== Early years ==
Daniel Ketcham was born in 1867 to Seth Ketcham and Almira Benham Ketcham on the family farm in Madison Township, Daviess County, Indiana, less than two miles west of the nearest village, Burns City, Martin County, Indiana, where he went for his early education. He then attended the U.S. Military Academy and graduated twenty-first in the class of 1890.

== Military career ==
Following his graduation from West Point, Ketcham was commissioned into the 2nd Regiment of Artillery as a 2nd Lieutenant. He served with the 2nd Artillery until 1894, when he attended the Artillery School and graduated with honors. After graduating from the Artillery School, Ketcham spent two years in Fort Warren (1895–1897).

After a brief period in Boston in 1899, Ketcham was stationed in Honolulu for a period of two years (1899–1901) before returning to the continent to be stationed in New York, first at Fort Hamilton from 1902 to 1903, and then at Fort Totten, from 1903 to 1904, where he graduated from the School of Submarine Defense.

In 1904, Ketcham was stationed at the Presidio of San Francisco, where he would remain until 1909. During his time here, Ketcham was promoted to major and transferred from the Artillery Corps to the Coast Artillery Corps in 1908. In 1909, Ketcham was stationed in the Philippines, commanding Fort Wint until 1911, when he returned to Fort Warren, this time as the commanding officer. In 1912, after only a year back in the U.S., Ketcham was appointed member of the General Staff in Washington D.C., position he would hold until 1914.

=== First World War ===
Promoted to lieutenant-colonel after the outbreak of the First World War in the summer of 1914, Ketcham took command of Coastal Defenses of the Delaware until 1915, when he became President of the Artillery Board, stationed at Fort Monroe, position he would hold until 1917. During his tenure as President of the Artillery Board, Ketcham also commanded the Civilian Training Camps at Chickamauga Park, Georgia, and Plattsburgh, New York, both during the summer of 1916. At the end of his tenure, Ketcham became the first commander of Fort Story, Virginia in February 1917, ground having been broken only the previous year. Ketcham's command lasted little, as on April of the same year, Ketcham was appointed a member of the Ordnance Board at Sandy Hook, New Jersey.

After the American entry into World War I, in April 1917, Ketcham was promoted to colonel and assigned once more to the General Staff in Washington D.C. as part of the War Plans Division from August 1917 to May 1918, filling the role of Acting Chief of War Plans Division from January to May 1918. In June 1918, Ketcham was sent to France with the American Expeditionary Forces (AEF) to attend the General Staff College of the AEF at Langres, from which he graduated in September 1918.

On 19 September 1918, Ketcham took command of the 34th Brigade of the Coast Artillery Corps at Angers, France, and was promoted to brigadier general on 1 October 1918. He would remain in France in command of the Brigade until early 1919, by which time the war was over due to the Armistice with Germany on November 11, 1918.

== After the war ==
After returning from France in early 1919, Ketcham took command of Camp Taylor, Kentucky, for the spring of 1919. He was returned to the rank of colonel on 15 May 1919, and he retired at his own request on 24 May 1919 following 32 years of service. His rank as a brigadier general was restored in June 1930.

== Personal life and death ==
On 9 October 1897, Daniel Ketcham married Edith Varnum Smith. He died at his home in Indianapolis on 19 July 1935, aged sixty-eight. Ketcham is interred at the Burns City Cemetery near the graves of his parents.
