= Clint Calvin Hearn =

United States Army general (1866–1928)

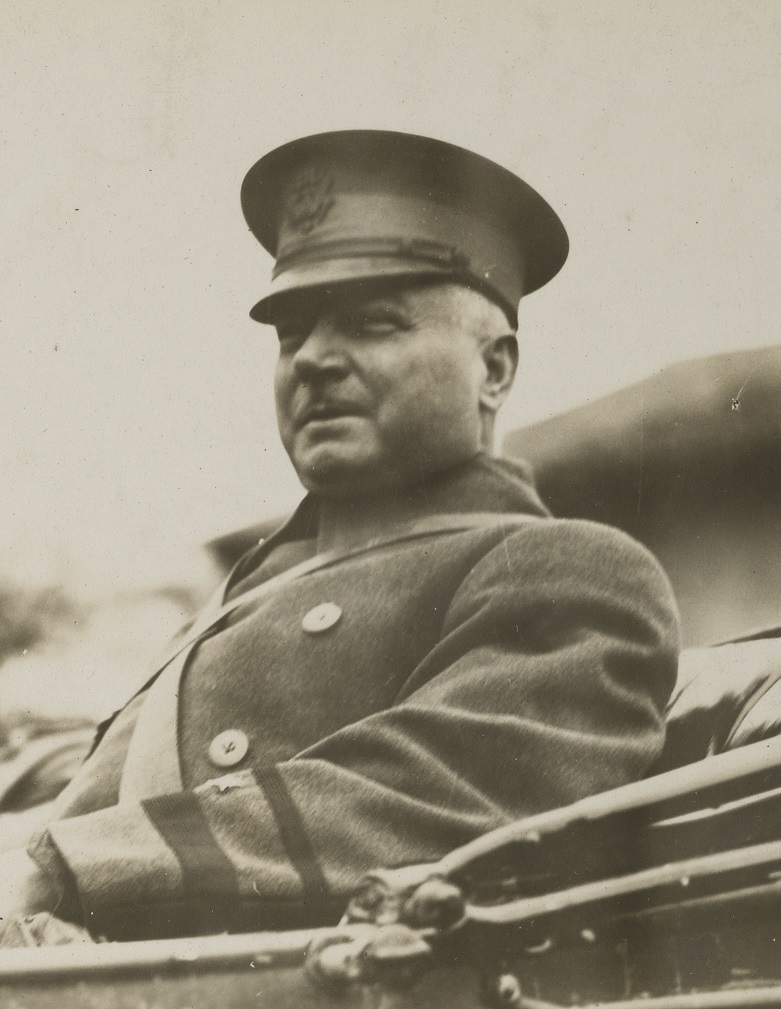
- Brig. Gen. Clint Hearn in France 1918
- Born: March 29, 1866; Weston, Texas, U.S.
- Died: February 11, 1928 (aged 61); Atlanta, Georgia, U.S.
- Burial place: Arlington National Cemetery
- Spouse: Laura Wright Ovaker
- Military career
- Allegiance: United States
- Branch: United States Army
- Service years: 1890–1927
- Rank: Brigadier general
- Service number: 0-222
- Conflicts: World War I
- Awards: Distinguished Service Medal

Clint Calvin Hearn (March 29, 1866 – February 11, 1928) was a United States Army officer in the late 19th and early 20th centuries. He served in World War I and received the Distinguished Service Medal.

== Biography ==
Hearn was born on March 29, 1866, in Weston, Texas. He graduated 14th in a class of 54 from the United States Military Academy in 1890.

Hearn was commissioned into the Fourth Artillery. He graduated from the Artillery School in 1894, from the School of Submarine Defense in 1898, from the United States Army War College in 1912, and from the General Staff College in 1920. Circa 1904 he was co-developer of the Whistler-Hearn plotting board and authored a manual on fire control. Hearn was promoted to the rank of brigadier general on August 5, 1917, and he commanded the 153rd Field Artillery Brigade in the 78th Infantry Division. He received the Distinguished Service Medal for his efforts. Hearn reverted to his permanent rank of colonel on June 15, 1919. He commanded the Harbor Defenses of Manila and Subic Bays in the Philippines in 1919.

After the war's end, starting on April 10, 1922, Hearn served as the Chief of Staff of the Non-Divisional Group of the Reserve Units in Harrisburg, Pennsylvania. He retired in 1927.

Hearn died in Atlanta, Georgia on February 11, 1928, and he is buried at Arlington National Cemetery. Congress restored his brigadier general rank in June 1930.

== Personal life ==
Hearn married Laura Wright Ovaker on December 2, 1897.

== Bibliography ==
- Davis, Henry Blaine Jr. (1998). Generals in Khaki. Raleigh, North Carolina: Pentland Press. ISBN 1571970886. OCLC 40298151.
- Hearn, Capt. Clint C. (1907). Fire Control and Direction for Coast Artillery. U.S. Signal School.
- Marquis Who's Who (1975). Who Was Who In American History – The Military. Chicago, Illinois: Marquis Who's Who. ISBN 0837932017.
