= William Church Davis =

United States Army general

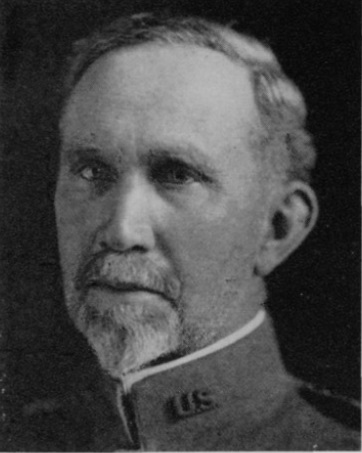
- From the Winter 1959 issue of Assembly magazine
- Born: May 11, 1866; Solon, New York, U.S.
- Died: September 23, 1958 (aged 92); Berkeley, California, U.S.
- Burial place: San Francisco National Cemetery
- Spouse: Margaret Turner Schenck (m. 1896-1958, his death)
- Children: 4
- Military career
- Allegiance: United States
- Branch: United States Army
- Service years: 1890–1921 (Army); 1921–1930 (Organized Reserve Corps)
- Rank: Brigadier General (Army); Brigadier General (Reserve); Major General (Retired list)
- Service number: 0-13519
- Unit: Field Artillery Branch
- Commands: Army Transport Service, Manila; 32nd Heavy Artillery Brigade; 31st Heavy Artillery Brigade; V Corps Artillery
- Conflicts: Spanish–American War; Philippine–American War; Boxer Rebellion; World War I
- Awards: Army Distinguished Service Medal
- Other work: Director, Berkeley, California chapter, American Red Cross; Treasurer, Pacific Coast branch, Army Relief Society

William C. Davis (May 11, 1866 – September 23, 1958) was a career officer in the United States Army. A veteran of Spanish–American War, Philippine–American War, Boxer Rebellion, World War I, he attained the rank of major general and was a recipient of the Army Distinguished Service Medal. Davis was most notable for his First World War command of the 31st Heavy Artillery Brigade, 32nd Heavy Artillery Brigade, and the V Corps Artillery.

== Early life ==
William Church Davis was born in Solon, New York on May 11, 1866, the son of Samuel Davis and Roxanna (Brown) Davis. (Note: Many sources indicate that Davis was born in McGraw, New York. In his application for membership in the Sons of the American Revolution, Davis states that he was born in Solon, near McGraw.) He was raised on his parents' farm in Solon and attended the Baker District School and Cortland Normal School. He was an 1886 graduate of Spencer Academy.

In 1886, Davis received an appointment to the United States Military Academy from Congressman Frank Hiscock. He graduated in 1890 ranked 15th of 54. He received his commission as a second lieutenant of artillery.

== Start of career ==
Davis was initially assigned to the 5th U.S. Artillery Regiment at the Presidio of San Francisco. He remained with the 5th Artillery until 1894, and was with his regiment when it took part in the response to labor unrest in San Francisco during the 1894 the Pullman Strike. Davis attended the Field Artillery Officers' Course at Fort Monroe, Virginia from 1895 to 1896.

From 1897 to 1898, Davis was commandant of cadets at Colorado State Agricultural College in Fort Collins, Colorado. In 1898, he was promoted to first lieutenant and assigned to the 6th U.S. Artillery at Fort McHenry, Maryland. During the Spanish–American War, Davis was assigned to depot quartermaster duties, and assumed responsibility for purchasing, inspecting, and shipping large quantities of supplies and equipment to Army units serving in Cuba and elsewhere.

In April 1899, Davis was posted to Manila with his regiment and participated in the Philippine–American War. Major General Elwell Stephen Otis, commander of the Philippine Department subsequently appointed Davis as head of the Army Transport Service in Manila, making Davis responsible for coordinating the train and ship movement of troops and supplies throughout the Philippines. During this assignment, Otis promoted Davis to captain in recognition of his noteworthy accomplishments. While serving in the Philippines, Davis also traveled to China during the Boxer Rebellion to coordinate the withdrawal and transportation of U.S. service members.

== Continued career ==
In 1903, Davis graduated from the School of Submarine Defense at Fort Totten, New York. (Note: The School of Submarine Defense provided instruction on the use of underwater mines for the protection of harbors.) From 1904 to 1907, he was again stationed at the Presidio of San Francisco, this time as engineer of the artillery district that included San Francisco Bay. He took part in the response to the 1906 San Francisco earthquake, including firefighting and search and rescue of citizens trapped in collapsed buildings.

While serving as district artillery engineer, Davis designed and installed a fire control system for the coast artillery guns that defended San Francisco Bay. In addition, he oversaw the planning and execution of an effort to employ underwater mines outside the mouth of the bay as an additional protective measure. Davis also experimented with the design and implementation of portable searchlights for use with coast artillery guns, and his designs and procedures were adopted by coast artillery units at other U.S. ports. He subsequently carried out similar coast artillery assignments for the Harbor Defenses of Portland, Maine, Harbor Defenses of Boston, San Diego Bay, and Pensacola Bay.

== World War I ==
In December 1917, Davis was promoted to temporary brigadier general and assigned to command of the 32nd Heavy Artillery Brigade. After arriving in France, Davis' brigade completed training at Limoges, then moved to the front in time to participate in the Battle of Saint-Mihiel. He was subsequently assigned to command of the 31st Heavy Artillery Brigade, which took part in the Meuse–Argonne offensive.

Davis later commanded the V Corps Artillery, which included his own brigade, two battalions of French field artillery, a battalion of French heavy artillery, and four separate French field artillery batteries. Davis led this command until the end of the war and was recommended for promotion to major general, but the recommendation had not been acted on before the Armistice of November 11, 1918 ended the war. His wartime achievements were recognized with award of the Army Distinguished Service Medal.

== Later career ==
After the war, Davis reverted to his permanent rank of colonel and was assigned to Camp Lewis, Washington, where he reorganized the 31st Heavy Artillery Brigade to perform coast artillery duties on the Pacific coast. In 1921, he requested retirement. Later that year he was appointed a brigadier general in the Organized Reserve Corps.

== Retirement and death ==
In retirement, Davis was a resident of Berkeley, California. He authored extensive genealogies on the families of both his parents, and was the organizer of the American Legion's Post 7 in Berkeley. Davis also served as director of the Berkeley chapter of the American Red Cross and treasurer of the Army Relief Society's Pacific Coast branch. In 1948, Davis became a member of the Sons of the American Revolution.

Davis retired from the Organized Reserve Corps upon reaching the mandatory retirement age of 64 in 1930. In June 1930, Congress passed legislation allowing World War I general officers to retire at the highest rank they had held, and Davis was promoted to brigadier general on the retired list. In 1942, Congress enacted a law permitting general officers from World War I to be advanced one grade on the retired list if they had been recommended during the war for a promotion they did not receive, and if they had received the Medal of Honor, Distinguished Service Cross, or Army Distinguished Service Medal. Davis met these criteria, and was advanced to major general on the retired list.

Davis died in Berkeley on September 23, 1958. He was buried at San Francisco National Cemetery.

== Family ==
In 1896, Davis married Margaret Turner Schenck (1875–1971), daughter of Army officer Alexander DuBois Schenck They were married until his death and were the parents of four children, three of whom lived to adulthood: Margaret Brown Davis (1897–1987), William Schenck Davis (1899–1981), Samuel Schenck Davis (1906–1982), and Alexander DuBois Schenck Davis (1910–1911).
