= Harry Hill Bandholtz =

American army officer (1864–1925)

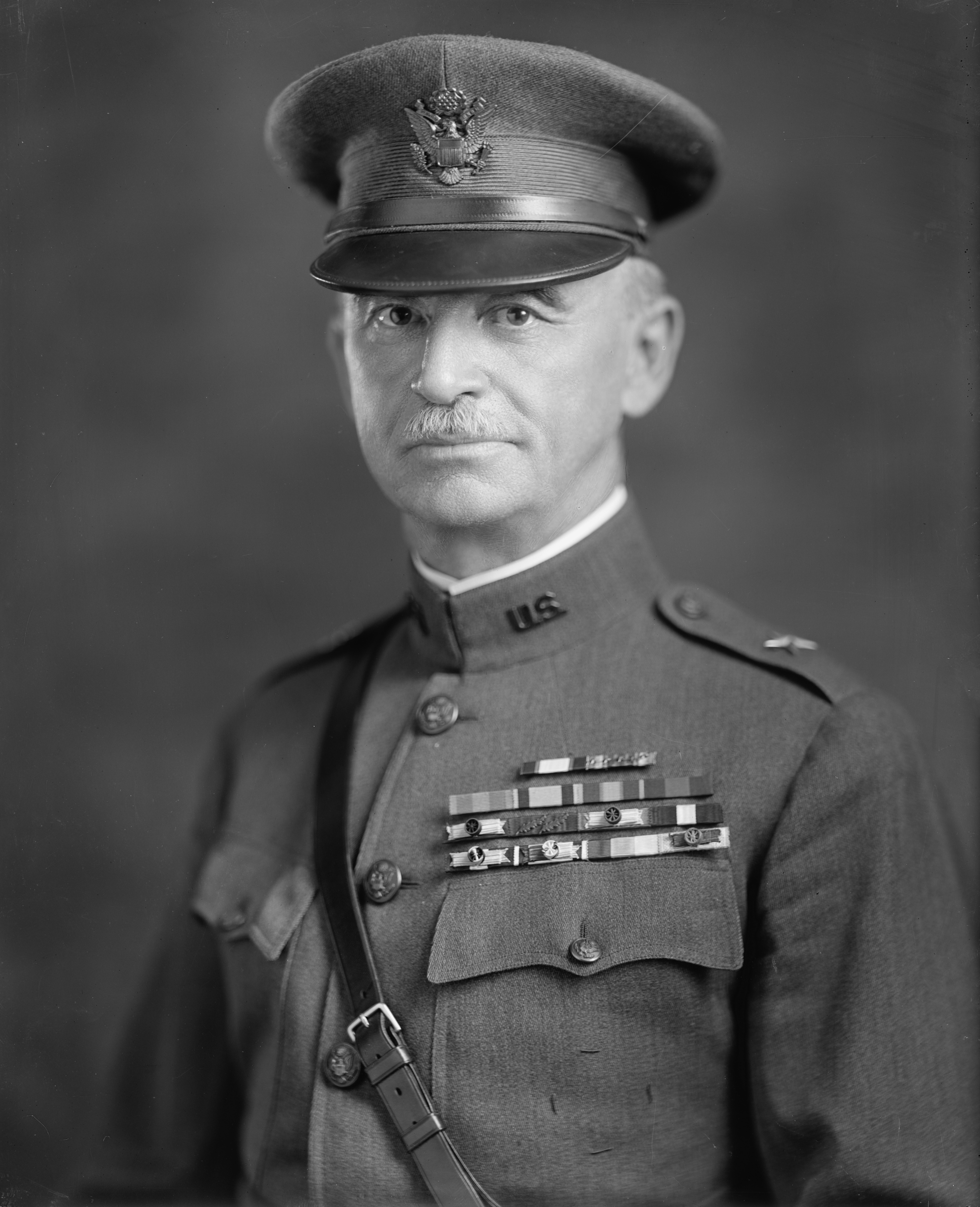
- Brigadier General Bandholtz
- Born: December 18, 1864; Constantine, Michigan, U.S.
- Died: May 7, 1925 (aged 60); Constantine, Michigan, U.S.
- Burial place: Constantine Township Cemetery, Constantine, Michigan
- Spouses: May Cleveland (m. 1890; div. 1922) Inez Claire Gorman (m. 1922)
- Relatives: Cleveland Bandholtz (son)
- Military career
- Allegiance: United States
- Branch: United States Army
- Service years: 1890–1923
- Rank: Major general
- Unit: 29th Division
- Commands: Military District of Washington; 58th Brigade, 29th Division
- Wars: Spanish–American War; Philippine–American War; Mexican Border War; World War I
- Awards: Distinguished Service Medal; Silver Star

Harry Hill Bandholtz (December 18, 1864 – May 7, 1925) was a United States Army career officer who served for more than a decade in the Philippines. He was a major general during World War I, and the U.S. representative of the Inter-Allied Military Mission in Hungary in 1919.

== Early life ==
Bandholtz was born in Constantine, Michigan, on December 18, 1864. He was the youngest of two children. His father, Christian Johan Bandholtz, was an emigrant from Schleswig-Holstein and earned his living as a harness maker. Elizabeth Hill, his mother, was a milliner.

Bandholtz attended local schools and graduated from high school in 1881. He first worked locally as a billing clerk, and later found work in Chicago as a bookkeeper for a mercantile exchange company. In Illinois, Bandholtz enlisted in the National Guard of the United States. Also while in Chicago, he met May Cleveland, whom he would marry in 1890. They had a son together, Cleveland Hill Bandholtz.

== Military career ==
Attracted to a military career, Bandholtz gained a nomination to the United States Military Academy at West Point, where he graduated, 29th in a class of 54, in June 1890. From 1890 to 1898, he was active in the US Army and taught at the Michigan Agricultural College. Afterward, he was involved in the Spanish–American War and was sent to Cuba.

=== Service in the Philippines ===
In July 1900, Bandholtz was transferred to the Philippines during the Philippine–American War. Eventually he served 13 years there, as the US had an occupying force in the country. Most Filipinos viewed Americans as yet another "tyrannical overseer", having been under Spanish rule. Bandholtz was perceived as sincere and appeared able to earn the Filipinos' trust.

In 1902, he served as Provincial Governor of Tayabas Province in the Philippines. He was the only American Army Officer elected by the Filipino people. As an Army captain assigned in the Philippines, he became an early backer of Manuel L. Quezon.

In 1903, Bandholtz was appointed colonel in the Philippines Constabulary. In June 1907, he was promoted to brigadier general. Also in 1907, Bandholtz was elected as commander of the Veteran Army of the Philippines. He served as Chief of the Philippines Constabulary until 1913. During this period, the US and Philippine government forces continued to fight against guerrilla resistance in more isolated areas. That fighting ended in 1913.

The next year, Bandholtz organized a joining of the United States Spanish War Veterans with the Veteran Army of the Philippines. This would eventually lead to the creation of the Veterans of Foreign Wars.

Bandholtz supported the United States colonial government during a period when violent rebellion to American rule continued in the Philippines. He was credited with persuading guerrilla leaders to surrender. In one instance, he entered unarmed into an insurgent camp with a native guide. After he spoke with Colonel Antonio Loamo, Loamo surrendered and gave up seventy men and thirty rifles.

Bandholtz was largely responsible for orchestrating the capture of Filipino insurgent leader and former revolutionary Macario Sakay, who had continued anti-American guerrilla activities after most hostilities in the Philippines had ended. In July 1906, after Sakay had surrendered to American authorities on the promise of amnesty, Bandholtz invited Sakay to a party in Cavite; upon Sakay's arrival, Bandholtz had him and his men arrested and their weapons confiscated. Following his capture, Sakay was tried, convicted and sentenced to death by hanging.

=== World War I ===
After his service in the Philippines ended in 1913, Bandholtz returned to the US to serve in the US infantry as a major. He was assigned to the 29th Infantry and made commander of Fort Porter, New York. He also served as chief of staff of the New York National Guard (later the 27th Division) during its service in the Mexican Border War and senior inspector and instructor of the New York National Guard.

In 1917, he was promoted to commander of the 58th Brigade of the 29th Division. He accompanied his unit to France in June of that same year, serving for three months after the US entered the Great War (World War I). On September 27, he was named United States Army Provost Marshal General to General John J. Pershing's American Expeditionary Forces (AEF) in France. He held this position during the rest of the war and until 1919.

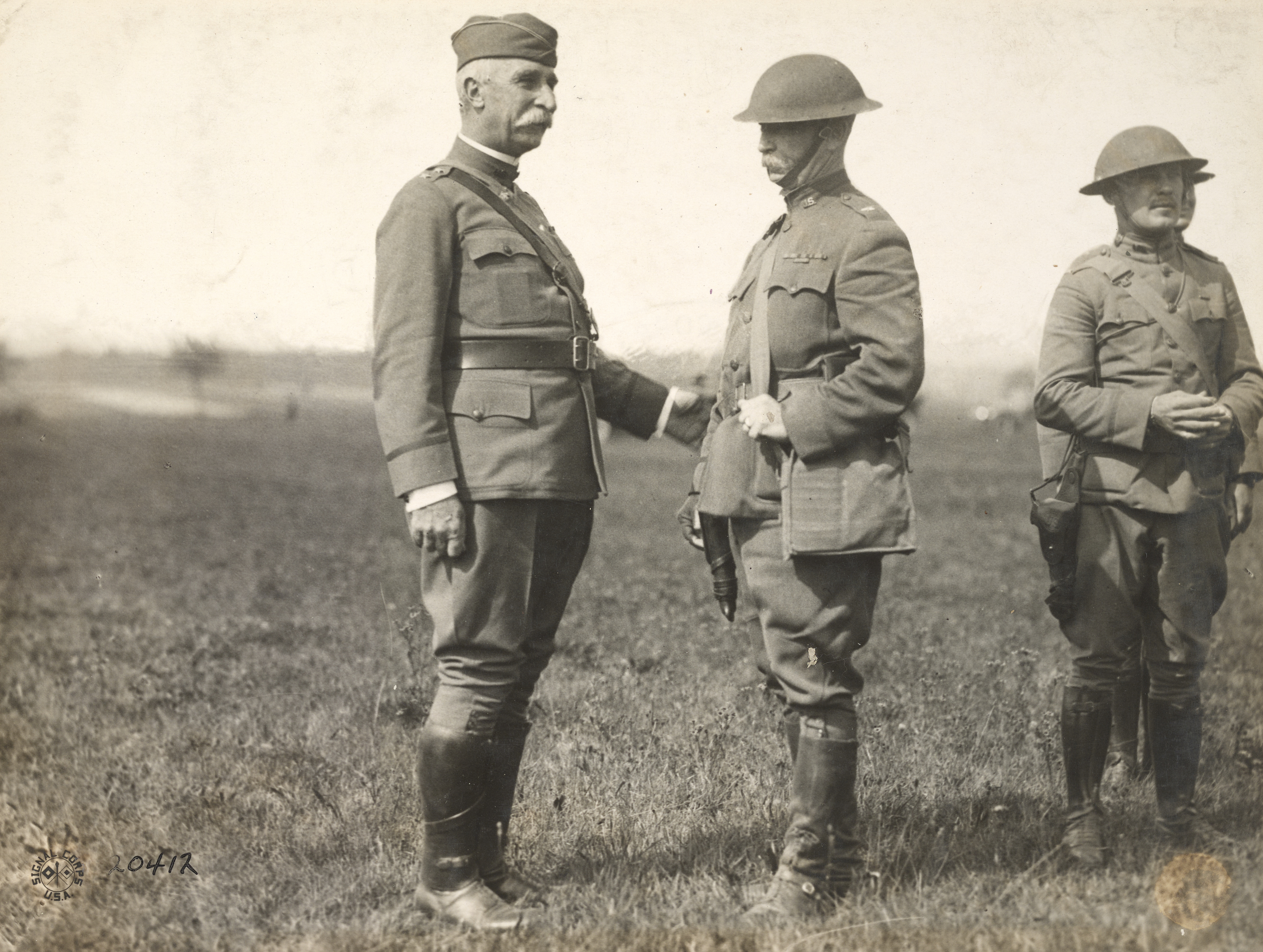
The commander of the 29th Division, Major General Charles G. Morton, left, and Brigadier General Harry H. Bandholtz, wearing a steel helmet, at a review at Alsace, France, August 23, 1918

General Bandholtz reorganized the Military Police Corps, established a Military Police school in Autun, France, and advocated a permanent Military Police Corps following the war. Bandholtz is widely considered to be the "father" of the United States Army's Military Police Corps.

=== Mission to Hungary ===
Between August 1919 and February 9, 1920, Bandholtz was the U.S. representative to the Inter-Allied Supreme Command's Military Mission in Hungary. The Military Mission was charged with disarming the Hungarian military and supervising the withdrawal of the Serbian and Romanian armies, which were occupying the territory of Hungary. The Allies had promised that people would be able to make self-determination of their futures as Austria-Hungary and other empires were broken up. According to his own accounts, he is said to have prevented the arrest of Hungarian Prime Minister István Friedrich by the Romanians. On August 25, in the MÁVAG factory he intercepted 135 Romanian trucks packed with material despite the prohibition of requisition and prevented the factory from sacking. He is also remembered for preventing the Romanian military authorities from removing artefacts from the Hungarian National Museum on October 5, 1919; he was "armed" only with a riding crop. The Romanian aim was to recover artefacts taken from the Library of the Romanian Academy during the Central Powers' occupation of Bucharest and from the Transylvanian museums (from a territory which was claimed by the Kingdom of Romania) by the retreating Austro-Hungarian troops. Bandholtz locked the doors and placed signs that read, "This door sealed by Order the Inter-Allied Military Commission. H.H. Bandholtz, President of the Day, October 5th, 1919."

On February 13, 1920 Bandholtz was interviewed by the correspondent of The New York Times in Paris, during which he stated he stopped by himself the Romanian military from entering the Hungarian National Museum, and thus preventing a "gold treasure" from being stolen. However, in his own memoirs An Undiplomatic Diary by the American Member of the Inter-Allied Military Mission to Hungary, 1919–1920, he did not mention any gold treasure, only museum artefacts. At the protest of the Romanian authorities, Bandholtz retracted his statements from the interview, and the US Department of State sent a verbal note to the Romanian Legation in Washington, according to which the correspondent of The New York Times attributed statements to Bandholtz "gratuitously and without his approval".

=== Post Military Service ===
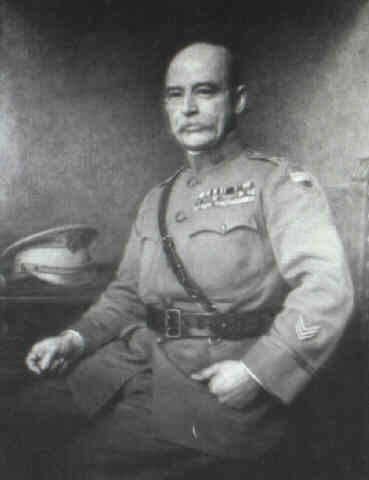
Bandholtz in 1920

After returning to the US, Bandholtz commanded the 13th Infantry Brigade at Camp Funston in Kansas. This camp had been established for troops to be trained for World War I.

In 1920, a rebellion among miners broke out in Mingo County, West Virginia, after two mineworkers were assassinated on the McDowell County courthouse steps. President Warren G. Harding sent Gen. Bandholtz and Gen. Billy Mitchell to control the situation. Bandholtz threatened protesting mineworkers that they would be tried for treason. Mineworkers tried to compromise, saying they would stop fighting if federal troops would come and enforce the law evenhandedly, but this was initially refused by Bandholtz. Eventually federal troops were deployed and mine workers quickly ceased fighting. Several treason trials were eventually held, at private expense, The prosecution failed to gain convictions and the trials of citizens outraged much of the wider US society.

The 13th Brigade was deactivated in August 1921 and Bandholtz assumed duty as commanding general, Military District of Washington. On January 28, 1922, Bandholtz assisted in rescue operations at the collapse of the Knickerbocker Theatre during the noted Knickerbocker Storm. In the end, 98 people were killed and 133 were seriously injured. For his effort and handling of the situation, Bandholtz received a letter of commendation from the Secretary of War.

Bandholtz retired from active service for disability on November 4, 1923, and was promoted to the rank of major general. He received many awards during his military career, including the Cross of Commander Order of the Crown, Cross of Commander French Legion of Honor, and Croix de Guerre with Palm. He was also honored with other foreign awards, such as the Grand Cross Montenegro Silver Medal for Valor and the Romanian Grand Cross, Order of the Cross. The latter is the only award of this class given to an American.

== Personal life ==
Bandholtz and his wife May separated in 1918 after 28 years of marriage. They divorced in 1922.

In April 1922, a few months after the divorce was made final, Bandholtz married Inez Claire Gorman in New York City. Gorman was twenty-five years younger than Bandholtz. The marriage caused tension between Bandholtz and his only son Cleveland. Also a career officer, he was by then serving as a colonel in the United States Army.

Bandholtz suffered from heart problems later in life. On May 7, 1925, he died at his home in Constantine, Michigan at the age of 60. Bandholtz is buried in Constantine Township Cemetery.

== Memorial in Budapest ==
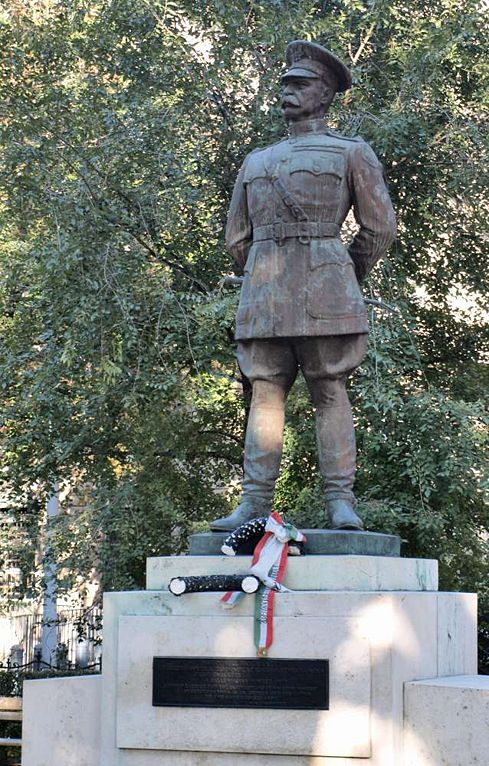
The statue of Major General Bandholtz (by Miklós Ligeti) in front of the US Embassy in Budapest, Hungary

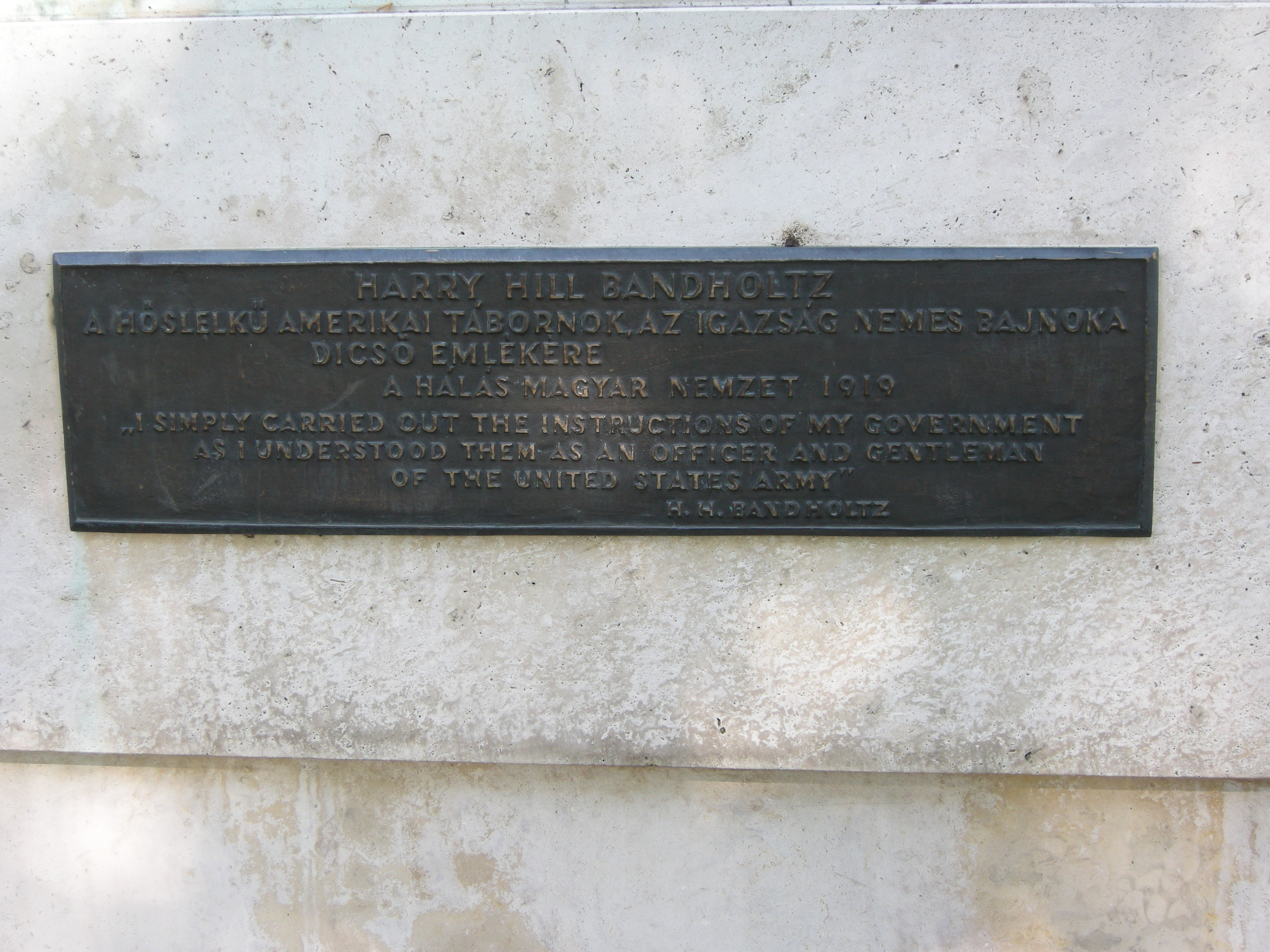
Plaque of Bandholtz statue

In 1936, the Hungarian government commissioned a statue in Bandholtz's honor and placed it in Szabadság tér (Liberty Square) across from the US embassy in Budapest. It is inscribed with the following (a quote from him):

I simply carried out the instructions of my government, as I understood them, as an officer and a gentleman of the United States Army.

The statue, made by prominent Hungarian sculptor Miklós Ligeti, depicts Bandholtz with his riding crop in one hand. According to the historical fact about his standoff with the Romanian military, he had persuaded them to stop looting the National Museum with nothing more than the crop and the force of his personality. The incident is described in detail in his book An Undiplomatic Diary by the American Member of the Inter-Allied Military Mission to Hungary, 1919–1920. Today the crop is on display in the Hungarian National Museum.

Romanian representatives objected to the memorial. The protests of the Romanian authorities led the American embassy to adopt a more circumspect attitude, deciding that only American diplomats of lesser rank be present at the unveiling of the monument.

After World War II, the statue was repaired. But in 1949, it was removed by the new Communist government that had come to power. In 1985, at the request of Ambassador Nicolas M. Salgo, the Hungarian government moved the work from a statue boneyard to the garden of the US Ambassador's residence. It was returned to its original place in the park in front of the US embassy on July 6, 1989, a day before President George H. W. Bush's historic visit to Budapest. The inscription was restored in 1993, a few years after the dissolution of the Soviet Union.

== Legacy ==
His papers are held at the University of Michigan's Bentley Historical Library.

== In popular culture ==
- Bandholtz was portrayed by Spanish-Filipino actor Bon Vibar in the 1993 movie Sakay, which was about national hero Macario Sakay, who fought the Americans during the Philippine–American War.
- Bandholtz was portrayed by American actor Chris Perris in the 2012 movie El Presidente: General Emilio Aguinaldo Story and the First Philippine Republic. which was about revolutionarist and military leader Emilio Aguinaldo, a first President of the Philippine Republic.

== See also ==
- Hungarian–Romanian War
- Revolutions and interventions in Hungary (1918–20)
- Hungarian Soviet Republic

== Notes ==
Political offices
Preceded by Cornelius Gardener	Governor of Tayabas; 1902–1903	Succeeded by Ricardo Paras
