= Lynn Aloysius Belvedere =

Fictional character created by Gwen Davenport

Lynn Belvedere
- Mr. Belvedere character
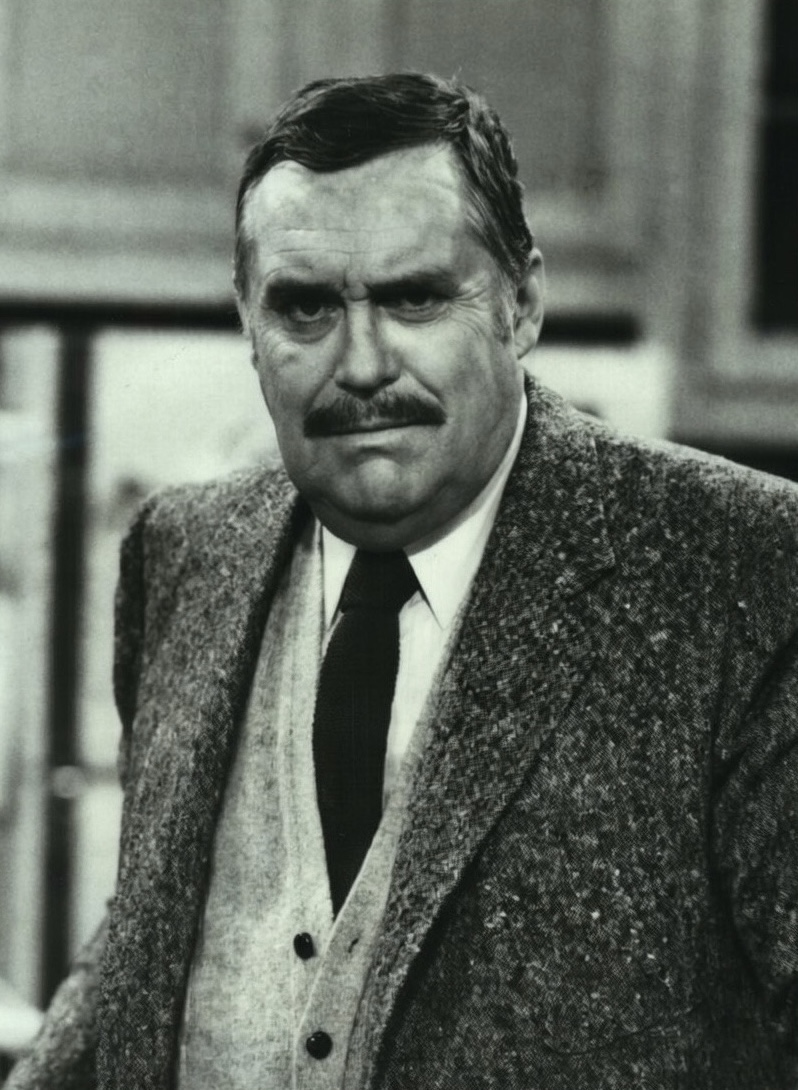
- Christopher Hewett as Lynn Aloysius Belvedere
- First appearance: Belvedere (1947)
- Created by: Gwen Davenport
- Portrayed by: Clifton Webb (film series); Christopher Hewett (Mr. Belvedere)

In-universe information
- Full name: Lynn Aloysius Belvedere
- Gender: Male
- Occupation: Housekeeper
- Origin: England

Lynn Aloysius Belvedere is a fictional character created by Gwen Davenport for her 1947 novel Belvedere, and later adapted for film and television.

== Novel ==
Belvedere was written in 1947 by Gwen Davenport. Set during the final months of World War II, it concerns a writer who goes to work as a nanny for a dysfunctional family in suburban Louisville. Tacey King, a frustrated housewife and college-trained sculptor with two young boys and a baby girl, lives with her husband Harry in a lightly fictionalized stand-in for the wealthy Mockingbird Valley community (here called "Hummingbird Hill"). Tacey takes out an advertisement in the Saturday Review of Literature for a "struggling young novelist who would welcome pleasant room, board, in exchange sitting with children evenings," hoping to secure free domestic assistance during the wartime labor shortage, as well as liven up the house with an artistic presence. Belvedere replies to the ad, and Tacey invites him to interview for the position in Louisville, believing "Lynn" to be a woman.

In Davenport's novel, almost nothing of Belvedere's age, experiences or background is mentioned, other than that he arrives for the job from Indianapolis (though he asks rhetorically later, with some bitterness, "do I look like a Hoosier?" when asked if he is from Indiana). He is a self-declared "genius" in the early stages of his "life's work," a trilogy of novels, the first of which is entitled David Copperhead. At one point, Tacey describes him as a "lonely misanthrope." At the end of the book, when Tacey questions Belvedere about his past and plans for the future, he reveals only that he was left by a woman who did not believe his work as a writer could support her.

"We never really come to know this remarkable person," wrote one contemporary reviewer of Davenport's Belvedere, "for Tacey, Harry, the children and the neighbors could never do that." Another reviewer compared Belvedere's temperament and presence in the King's household to that of the overbearing, self-centered writer played by Monty Woolley in the comic play and motion picture The Man Who Came to Dinner. In fact, 20th Century Fox head Darryl Zanuck joked later that the studio had purchased the rights to the novel with Woolley in mind for the lead role.

Physically, Belvedere is described as "immensely tall, with a narrow, emaciated body," and with "deep-set, burning eyes in a pallid face...high, slanted cheekbones and black hair that sprang back from a bulbous forehead," as variously "stern" or "brooding" with an "aloof" and "inscrutable" manner. The first edition's cover art portrays Belvedere as a tall young man intensely studying a manuscript; later paperback editions released to capitalize on the movie would portray him with as an older man with a mustache with more of a resemblance to Clifton Webb, who would play the character onscreen.

== In other media ==
=== Film ===
Three films featured the character, starring Clifton Webb as Lynn Belvedere:

- Sitting Pretty (1948), for which Webb received a nomination for Academy Award for Best Actor.
- Mr. Belvedere Goes to College (1949)
- Mr. Belvedere Rings the Bell (1951)

The Belvedere of the motion pictures was less of an brooding young artist than in Davenport's novel, portrayed instead by Webb as a well-dressed, self-disciplined and elderly eccentric with the actor's distinctive Northeastern elite accent, arrogant and acerbic, but committed to his role as a nanny. A self-proclaimed "genius" and "philosopher," Belvedere practices yoga, vegetarianism and Fletcherism.

Webb saw the Belvedere role as an opportunity to make a break from earlier film roles, such as in Laura (1944) and The Dark Corner (1946); Webb felt he was being increasingly typecast as a villain. Webb had been given a copy of Davenport's novel by a friend who thought he might be good in the role. When Webb approached Zanuck, the studio boss had also identified the role as a potential vehicle for him. In an interview with the Los Angeles Times, Webb said that Belvedere was "quite impersonal, very detached; nothing fazes him. He is with people but never becomes a part of them."

In the first film, Harry and Tacey King hire Lynn Belvedere sight unseen as a nanny for their three young rambunctious boys, believing that "Lynn" is a woman. They are surprised that Lynn is a dapper older gentleman who has many skills and achievements; aside from being a proficient cook and handyman, at various points, he claims to have been a beekeeper, obstetrician, dog trainer, locksmith, boxer, and film director, as well as dance instructor to Arthur Murray and a field surgeon under General John J. Pershing. Belvedere declares that he detests children, but he quickly wins over the boys. Harry, however, is annoyed by Belvedere's superior attitude. After a number of misunderstandings and scandals, Belvedere writes a best-selling novel that exposes the secrets of the local residents.

Subsequently, he goes to college to complete a four-year degree in one year, where he reveals his formal education ended in kindergarten, and explores the phenomenon of growing old.

=== Television ===
Multiple attempts failed to bring the character to television; three pilots based on the Belvedere character were made, with Reginald Gardiner in 1956, Hans Conried in 1959, and Victor Buono in 1965. A successful television series finally aired on ABC in 1985, with Christopher Hewett in the role.

In the series, Lynn Belvedere is hired by George (Bob Uecker) and Marsha Owens (Ilene Graff) as a housekeeper for their three children. They are surprised that "Lynn" is a dapper older gentleman, the confusion over Belvedere's given name the only element from the original source material retained in this adaptation. The three children are: oldest son Kevin (Rob Stone), daughter Heather (Tracy Wells) and youngest child Wesley (Brice Beckham). Wesley in particular develops a very close relationship with Mr. Belvedere. Being a cultured man with many skills and achievements (having even once worked for Winston Churchill), he also comes to serve as some sort of a "counselor" to the Owens clan, helping them solve their dilemmas and stay out of mischief. Each episode ends with Mr. Belvedere writing in his journal, recounting the events of the day (which is heard by the audience via his narration) with the Owens family and what he got out of it in terms of a lesson.

A United Press International profile from 1985 described Hewett's Belvedere as a "stouter, somewhat more genial incarnation" of Webb's "austerely elegant" take on the character. While Hewett admired Clifton Webb's portrayal of the character, he "never tried to copy it, because I'm 20 years older than Clifton Webb was then, and I'm certainly 20 times bigger. And you can't do a character in a weekly series with that kind of acerbic bitchiness he did so well. To do it week after week you would have to have some relief and show a warmer side." Hewett said in an interview he modeled his interpretation of Belvedere on the sorts of butlers and valets played on-screen by English character actor Arthur Treacher, noting that "Arthur never went out of fashion." As the show progressed, Hewett imbued the character with a warmer quality, drawing on memories of his "very wise" childhood nannies in England, putting "a lot of my nanny" in his portrayal of Belvedere. "When something hurt," he told an interviewer in 1989, "she would help and console me. Mother was for high tea, Nanny was for washing behind your ears."
