= List of Mr. Belvedere episodes =

This is the complete episode list for the U.S. TV series Mr. Belvedere, which spanned 6 seasons. There were 7 episodes made for season 1, and 22 episodes made for each subsequent season. A total of 117 episodes in the 6 seasons were produced for the ABC television network from 1985 to 1990, with some episodes being shelved by ABC, only to make their debut in off-network syndication. Each episode was videotaped before a live audience at ABC Television Center (now The Prospect Studios) in Hollywood, CA, (Sunset Gower Studios in the Pilot and Season 1) utilizing a multi-camera setup, though some episodes occasionally did on-location shoots. Also occasionally, the show did multi-part episodes. There were three in total (one from season 3, one from season 4, and one from season 6), and all of them were two-parts long.

All episodes are arranged here in the order of first television airing but in order to maintain continuity the series would need to be watched in order of production number. Information on ratings for first-run airings comes from Broadcasting Magazine and USA Today.

Tape dates (whenever available) have been compiled from various scripts, and other production materials online.

== Series overview ==
Season	Episodes	Originally released	
Season	Episodes	First released	Last released
1	7	March 15, 1985	April 26, 1985
2	22	September 27, 1985	March 28, 1986
3	22	September 26, 1986	May 15, 1987
4	20	October 30, 1987	May 6, 1988
5	24 (Note: Episodes 23–24 of season 5 only aired in syndication.)	October 14, 1988	May 5, 1989
6	22 (Note: Episodes 13–20 of season 6 only aired in syndication.)	September 16, 1989	July 8, 1990

Broadcast history

- March 1985–April 1985, ABC Friday 8:30–9:00
- August 1985–March 1987, ABC Friday 8:30–9:00
- May 1987–September 1987, ABC Friday 8:30–9:00
- October 1987–January 1988, ABC Friday 9:00–9:30
- January 1988–February 1988, ABC Friday 8:30–9:00
- March 1988–July 1989, ABC Friday 9:00–9:30
- August 1989–September 1989, ABC Friday 8:30–9:00
- September 1989–December 1989, ABC Saturday 8:00–8:30
- July 1990, ABC Sunday 8:30–9:00

== Episodes ==
=== Season 1 (1985) ===
The series began its run on ABC on Friday nights at 8:30 P.M. It left the schedule after April 26, 1985, and was replaced by a summer-replacement series called The Comedy Factory. The show returned on August 16, 1985, with reruns of select season 1 episodes, and season 2 began the following month. The plot events are described, below, using in-universe tone. When the series began, George was a sportswriter, Marsha was in law school, Kevin was a sophomore in high school, Heather was in junior high, and Wesley was in elementary school. The Pilot and the six season 1 episodes were directed by Tony Sheehan.

The Pilot was taped on January 9, 1985; all six season 1 episodes were taped from February–April of that same year.

List of Mr. Belvedere season 1 episodes
No. overall	No. in season	Title	Directed by	Written by	Original release date	Prod. code	Rating/share/rank (households)
1	1	"Stranger in the Night" "Pilot"	Tony Sheehan	Frank Dungan and Jeff Stein	March 15, 1985	3T01	17.2/28 (#21)
The ad that Marsha has placed seeking a housekeeper is answered by Mr. Belvedere who finds himself needing to adjust to suburban life, while the Owens are needing to adjust to having Mr. Belvedere around. Meanwhile, Wesley's hamster got loose somewhere in the house, Heather's boyfriend is pressuring her into a more serious relationship, and Kevin brings home a bad report card.: VTR (i.e. taped/filmed): January 9, 1985; An early, unaired version of the Pilot had different opening and ending titles (a purple family portrait book), an unidentified studio vocalist singing the main theme, and George being a Construction Worker. For the broadcast in March of 1985, Fox recut the Pilot to remove references to George's Construction job, and replace the main theme with Leon Redbone's version. The opening and ending titles were replaced with the season 1 versions.
2	2	"The Outcasts"	Tony Sheehan	Frank Dungan and Jeff Stein	March 22, 1985	3T03	15.8/25 (#32)
Wesley is upset when he and three other classmates are the only ones who are not invited to a classmate's party and Mr. Belvedere suggests that he throw a party of his own, but during Wesley's party he gets a belated invitation and walks out on his guests and then finds himself ridden with guilt later. Meanwhile, Kevin prepares for a ski trip.: First appearance of Casey Ellison as Miles.
3	3	"Gotta Dance"	Tony Sheehan	Jack Carrerow and Lisa A. Bannick	March 29, 1985	3T02	14.9/24 (#31)
George is all excited about Wesley joining the football team and goes all out to encourage him. However, after watching ballet with Mr. Belvedere, Wesley forgets about football and begins to only shows interest in taking up ballet and soon the entire family does their best to try to keep it a secret from George.: As of the taping this episode, Tony Sheehan is now credited as "Executive Producer" along with Dungan and Stein. Also as of this taping, Dungan and Stein are now credited for developing the series.
4	4	"Gorgeous George"	Tony Sheehan	Frank Dungan and Jeff Stein	April 5, 1985	3T05	15.4/26 (#27)
George takes Mr. Belvedere and Wesley to a wrestling match where a spectator Max 'Meat Grinder' Maxwell (Hard Boiled Haggerty) picks a fight with George, which ends with Mr. Belvedere defending George. Dealing with a bruised ego, George becomes impotent and wanting to feel like a man, he buys a motorcycle. Meanwhile, taking a cue from Mr. Belvedere, Wesley begins to get in fights at school.: VTR: March 15, 1985
5	5	"What I Did for Love"	Tony Sheehan	Nancy Steen and Neil Thompson	April 12, 1985	3T06	13.3/23 (#44)
Kevin tries to win the affections of a girl (Tricia Cast) by suddenly becoming interested in some of the causes that she believes in, such as animal rights. This leads to Kevin landing in jail after he spray-paints a mink coat. Meanwhile, George is the host of a call-in sports radio show but soon finds it difficult when no one calls in.
6	6	"The Lost Weekend"	Tony Sheehan	Frank Dungan and Jeff Stein	April 19, 1985	3T07	13.9/24 (#33)
When George and Marsha take a vacation to Florida, they leave Mr. Belvedere in charge of Kevin, Wesley, and a grounded Heather. Immediately after they leave, events go out of control, when Heather sneaks out with her friends to see a Prince concert and Wesley brings a massage therapist (Donna Pescow) over for a stressed-out Belvedere.: VTR: April 4, 1985; First appearance of Michele Matheson as Heather's ditzy friend Angela. She was first mentioned in the pilot episode.
7	7	"Sweet Charity"	Tony Sheehan	Jack Carrerrow and Lisa A. Bannick	April 26, 1985	3T04	16.1/28 (#17)
Heather and Wesley are collecting canned items to take to a food drive and while they are out they run across a bag lady (Anne Haney) and decide to bring her home. However, the family soon realizes that this may be one guest that may be there to stay. Meanwhile, Kevin's sculpture class is giving him a pain; he is trying to sculpt the head of Prince Charles with no luck.: VTR: March 8, 1985

=== Season 2 (1985–86) ===
All of seasons 2 and 3 were directed by Noam Pitlik. All 22 episodes of Season 2 were taped from August 1985 – March 1986.

List of Mr. Belvedere season 2 episodes
No. overall	No. in season	Title	Directed by	Written by	Original release date	Prod. code	Rating/share/rank (households)
8	1	"The Lion Sleeps Tonight"	Noam Pitlik	Jack Carrerow and Lisa A. Bannick	September 27, 1985	4G01	11.6/19 (#52)
Needing a peaceful night's sleep, Marsha kicks the constantly snoring George out of the bedroom. Meanwhile, Mr. Belvedere goes on a weekend trip, and while he is gone, George sleeps like a baby, but the snoring returns when Belvedere returns.: VTR: August 16, 1985; Production moves from Sunset Gower Studios to ABC Television Center.
9	2	"Tornado"	Noam Pitlik	Frank Dungan and Jeff Stein and Tony Sheehan	October 4, 1985	4G02	14.6/24 (#41)
A tornado watch adds to the tension between George and Mr. Belvedere after Belvedere takes it upon himself to edit a story George is writing. Things reach a head when a tornado forces everyone into the basement, and a pool contest begins between George and Belvedere. Neither one of them will allow something like the weather to interfere with their competition.: VTR: August 23, 1985
10	3	"The Cheerleader"	Noam Pitlik	Lissa Levin	October 11, 1985	4G03	12.9/22 (#50)
Heather and Angela have decided to try out for the cheerleading squad. However, when Marsha finds out, she takes an unusual attitude toward it, this just on the eve of her birthday, for which Wesley is scrambling to get a present. Meanwhile, Kevin snags a date with a girl he has been eying, but Marsha's birthday dinner becomes a conflict.: VTR: August 30, 1985
11	4	"Requiem"	Noam Pitlik	Jeffrey Ferro and Fredric Weiss	October 18, 1985	4G04	12.0/20 (#58)
During an accordion lesson, Wesley's teacher, Mr. Zabriskie (Albert Hague) suddenly dies right after a frustrated Wesley silently wished his death. This leads Wesley to believe he is the one responsible for his teacher's death, and he begins to believe he has a special power. Meanwhile, Heather gets a pair of high heels and has some trouble learning to walk in them.
12	5	"Delivery"	Noam Pitlik	Fredric Weiss and Jeffrey Ferro	October 25, 1985	4G05	12.8/22 (#52)
Kevin has his friend Robin (Kim Gillingham) come over to help him on a science project, and George and Marsha quickly become worried when Robin arrives 8 months pregnant and wanting to name the baby Kevin if it's a boy. That appears to be beside the point when Robin suddenly begins to go into labor in the Owens house, and Mr. Belvedere and George have to put aside their differences and team up to help with the delivery.: Kim Gillingham (Robin) also appears in the season 4 episode "Foxtrot" as Cindy.
13	6	"The Contract"	Noam Pitlik	Frank Dungan and Jeff Stein and Tony Sheehan	November 1, 1985	4G07	14.3/24 (#46)
Worried that Kevin will get drunk on the night of his junior prom, Marsha has Kevin sign a contract promising that if he drinks, he should call home for a ride and George and Marsha would promise not to hassle him. However, Kevin sees this contract as an open invitation to drink, which leads him to take the contract a bit too far and begin drinking all the time, which is really masking a deeper problem.: VTR: October 11, 1985
14	7	"Vows"	Noam Pitlik	Lissa Levin	November 8, 1985	4G06	14.6/23 (#40)
For their anniversary, George and Marsha act like it is just another day, while the kids suggest they renew their wedding vows. After doing some digging, trying to find George and Marsha's original wedding picture, Heather and Kevin make a shocking discovery that leads Kevin to re-examine his life.: As revealed in this episode, Kevin was an unplanned pregnancy. The same thing was also revealed about Wesley in the episode "Baby", from season 3.; Marsha's complete full name is revealed in this episode: Marsha Lee Cameron Owens.; VTR: October 4, 1985
15	8	"Strike"	Noam Pitlik	Jeffrey Ferro and Fredric Weiss	November 15, 1985	4G08	15.6/25 (#37)
When George's newspaper goes on strike, he finds himself bored to death and becoming increasingly more irritating to Belvedere. Meanwhile, the family tries to cut costs, which means no new car for Kevin, and Wesley and Heather put together a garage sale where Wesley inadvertently sells a priceless Faberge egg of Mr. Belvedere's.: Kevin alludes to the time he skidded his car into a golf course in the season 1 episode "The Lost Weekend".; Miriam Byrd-Nethery (Mary Tingle) also appeared in season 3's "Jobless" as Edna Wilks, and season 6's "Fear of Flying", as Ethel.
16	9	"The Letter"	Noam Pitlik	Karen Wengrod and Ken Cinnamon	November 22, 1985	4G10	17.2/26 (#30)
Wesley has joined the football team and is terrible at the sport, much to the disappointment of George. This re-opens old wounds in Kevin, who decides to secretly join the football team to get a letter and make George proud. However, when Kevin's grades slip, George comes down hard on him and Kevin decides to move out, just days before Thanksgiving.
17	10	"Pinball"	Noam Pitlik	Frank Dungan and Jeff Stein	November 29, 1985	4G09	13.2/21 (#47)
George buys a pinball machine to recapture memories from his youth, but quickly tires of it. However, Mr. Belvedere takes a liking to the machine and quickly becomes a pinball junkie, causing him to neglect his household duties. But when George sells the machine, Mr. Belvedere takes up a new residence, in the local arcade.
18	11	"The Prize"	Noam Pitlik	Story by : Jack Carrerow and Lisa A. Bannick; Teleplay by : Jack Carrerow and Lisa A. Bannick and Bob Perlow and Gene Braunstein	December 6, 1985	4G11	13.0/22 (#54)
Wesley begins selling cookies door to door in an attempt to win a trip to Disney World, but when he does win, he surprisingly gives it away to a sick kid in the hospital. Little does anyone know that Wesley has hopes that this will lead to an even better trip. Meanwhile, George and Mr. Belvedere hold a contest concerning the stock market, and Heather considers cheating on an algebra exam in order to bring her grades up.: Casey Ellison, who had previously played Miles in "The Outcasts", has a different role in this episode.
19	12	"Speechless"	Noam Pitlik	Frank Dungan and Jeff Stein	January 3, 1986	4G13	16.1/25 (#36)
When George learns that he is the winner of The Happy Guys of Pittsburgh Man of the Year Award, he is thrilled. That is, until he learns he must give a speech, something he is terrified of doing. Meanwhile, a project in one of his classes has Kevin "married" to a nice girl, but he is resistant to being seen with her in public.: VTR: December 6, 1985; Winifred Freedman makes her first appearance in the recurring role as Wendy.; Jack Dodson reprised his role as Carl Putnam in season 3's "Halloween", season 5's "Stakeout" and season 6's "A Happy Guys' Christmas".; Raleigh Bond also appeared in season 3's "Halloween" and season 5's "Stakeout".
20	13	"The Teacher"	Noam Pitlik	Lissa Levin	January 10, 1986	4G14	17.2/27 (#25)
With everyone busy with their own lives, Mr. Belvedere appears to be lonesome, at least from Wesley's point of view and decides what he needs is a woman in his life. However, the woman who piques his interest was not quite the woman Wesley had in mind, when Mr. Belvedere begins seeing Wesley's teacher (Allyn Ann McLerie).: VTR: December 13, 1985
21	14	"The Dropout"	Noam Pitlik	Jack Carrerow and Lisa A. Bannick	January 17, 1986	4G12	12.9/20 (#56)
Marsha is hitting the books for her finals, but she does not feel her hard work is paying off after she fails her exam. This leads her to decide to quit college and become a full-time housewife, complete with a housedress and a string of pearls around her neck (shades of June Cleaver), but Marsha's attempts at being a housewife soon make Mr. Belvedere's job obsolete.: VTR: November 22, 1985
22	15	"Rivals"	Noam Pitlik	Fredric Weiss and Jeffrey Ferro	January 24, 1986	4G15	15.2/24 (#43)
George and Mr. Belvedere become rivals in a contest over who can do without his favorite vice. George tries to give up smoking and Mr. Belvedere tries to give up junk food and each one discovers that trying to sneak may not be an option. Meanwhile, Heather is head over heels for her latest boyfriend (Jason Bateman) who happens to have a strong attraction – for Marsha.: VTR: December 20, 1985
23	16	"Wesley's Friend"	Noam Pitlik	Frank Dungan and Jeff Stein and Tony Sheehan	January 31, 1986	4G16	16.5/27 (#34)
When one of Wesley's friends is revealed to have AIDS, he is taken out of school due to the ignorance and uncertainty that many of the other children's parents share. This leads Wesley to shun his friend (Ina Fried) in fear of getting the disease himself. Meanwhile, Kevin takes a home economics class because he thinks it will be an easy A.
24	17	"The Will"	Noam Pitlik	Lissa Levin	February 7, 1986	4G17	17.2/27 (#26)
When one of George's cousins suddenly dies it prompts George and Marsha to prepare a will and they must decide who should look after the children if they should die suddenly. Mr. Belvedere, who happens to be their number one pick, turns them down without hesitancy.
25	18	"Valentine's Day"	Noam Pitlik	Story by : Lance Thompson and Brad Goldberg; Teleplay by : Jeffrey Ferro and Fredric Weiss	February 14, 1986	4G18	15.7/25 (#38)
Valentine's Day has one particular girl named Beth (Stacy Ferguson) going wild over Wesley, who does his best to try to avoid her. Meanwhile, Heather is let down after sending out tons of valentines, but gets none in return; that is, until a secret admirer begins sending her gifts. When her admirer reveals himself, she is less than thrilled. Meanwhile, Kevin gets a drumming gig with a musical group, but finds they're not quite up to his speed.: Songs performed by Kevin's group, the Young Savages, include "Standing on the Corner" by Frank Loesser, "High Hopes by Jimmy Van Heusen and Sammy Cahn, and "(How Much Is) That Doggie in the Window?" by Bob Merrill.
26	19	"Heather's Tutor"	Noam Pitlik	Lissa Levin	February 21, 1986	4G19	17.1/27 (#31)
Heather has been floundering in her French class and Marsha insists that she get a tutor (Rad Daly). Heather is thrilled to learn her tutor will be a high school boy but is not prepared to learn that he is blind. She quickly realizes he is just like any other boy. Meanwhile, there is an all out war between the Owens' and their neighbors, the Hufnagels, thanks to Wesley's antics.: VTR: February 14, 1986
27	20	"Amish"	Noam Pitlik	Tony Sheehan	March 7, 1986	4G20	14.8/23 (#39)
While at the library, studying for his SAT's, Kevin runs into a lost Amish girl (Kerry Noonan) whom he brings home, where she marvels at modern conveniences. Kevin soon learns about her culture and with all the pressures in his life he becomes smitten with the idea of becoming Amish himself, in hopes of escaping from the pressure of his world. Meanwhile, little does he know that she has become smitten with all the modern conveniences of his world.: VTR: February 21, 1986
28	21	"Dinner for Two"	Noam Pitlik	Fredric Weiss and Jeffery Ferro	March 21, 1986	4G21	14.9/24 (#29)
Marsha has been busy night after night with her study group leaving little time for George. George decides to plan a romantic dinner for two with Belvedere's help, but a surprised Marsha cannot even find time for that. Meanwhile, Kevin begins dating a Swedish foreign exchange student (Lisa Fuller) but finds Wesley and Heather tagging along on his date.: VTR: March 7, 1986
29	22	"The Play"	Noam Pitlik	Lissa Levin and Jeffrey Ferro and Fredric Weiss	March 28, 1986	4G22	14.7/26 (#32)
Wesley has been cast as the lead in the school play H.M.S. Pinafore by Gilbert and Sullivan, and he is all set to play the part. When the director quits the play, Mr. Belvedere steps in as director and makes a decision for the good of the show: he decides to recast the lead with Tommy Sullivan (Danny Cooksey), leaving Wesley out in the cold, who then attempts to sabotage the play.: VTR: March 14, 1986; Matthew Miller also appeared in season 3's "The Mogul".; Danny Cooksey appears as Tommy Sullivan. Cooksey had previously starred on Diff'rent Strokes.

=== Season 3 (1986–87) ===
The show left ABC on March 6, 1987, and was briefly replaced by the first season of The Charmings two weeks later. The remaining three episodes of this particular season aired from May 1–15, 1987. Afterwards, reruns of select season 3 episodes aired until September 11, 1987. All 22 episodes of Season 3 were taped from August 1986 – March 1987.

List of Mr. Belvedere season 3 episodes
No. overall	No. in season	Title	Directed by	Written by	Original release date	Prod. code	Rating/share/rank (households)
30	1	"The Thief"	Noam Pitlik	Jeffrey Ferro and Fredric Weiss	September 26, 1986	5A03	8.3/13 (#63)
Heather and Angela get a job at a music store and at least Heather seems to have enough responsibility to do a good job, that is until she begins dating the captain of the football team (Kirk Arnold) and he just assumes it would be okay to stop by Heather's work and rip off a few things. Meanwhile, Mr. Belvedere tries to beat Wesley at gin rummy.: Eric and Karl Bruskotter are brothers in real life.; Due to the series premieres of Sidekicks and Sledge Hammer!, this episode premiered at a special time at 9:30 P.M.
31	2	"Grandma"	Noam Pitlik	Frank Dungan and Jeff Stein and Tony Sheehan	October 3, 1986	5A04	14.5/25 (#47)
Heather and Angela are participating in an Adopt-a-Grandparent program at a retirement home and Wesley is talked into going with the prospect of squeezing some money out of an unsuspecting old person (Barbara Townsend). However, Wesley makes quick friends with one woman in particular but he soon realizes she has Alzheimer's disease. Meanwhile, Heather and Angela become friends with a grumpy old man who does nothing but complain.: Ellen Albertini Dow also appeared in season 4's "The Trip: Part 1"; This episode was James Gregory's final project as an actor. Henry Jones replaced him as Mr. Sparks for "The Trip: Parts 1 and 2" in season 4.
32	3	"Debut"	Noam Pitlik	Fredric Weiss and Jeffrey Ferro	October 17, 1986	5A05	14.4/24 (#38)
George has a near-death experience after he is electrocuted when the TV falls into the bathtub. Mr. Belvedere saves his life but after he recovers, George quits his sports writing job and decides to do some things he always wanted to do, including taking up a career as a lounge singer. Worried about George's prospects, Mr. Belvedere has Robert Goulet stop by to give George some advice.: Featured songs: "On a Clear Day You Can See Forever", written by Burton Lane for the musical of the same name (performed by Bob Uecker and Robert Goulet), "Till There Was You", written by Meredith Willson for The Music Man (performed by Bob Uecker), "Come Fly with Me", composed by Jimmy Van Heusen, with lyrics by Sammy Cahn (performed by Bob Uecker), "My Kind of Town", also composed by Jimmy Van Heusen, with lyrics by Sammy Cahn (performed by Bob Uecker), "Shaddap You Face", written by Joe Dolce (performed by Bob Uecker), "Our Love Is Here to Stay", written by George and Ira Gershwin for the 1938 movie, The Goldwyn Follies, and popularized in the 1951 movie An American in Paris (performed by Robert Goulet, Ilene Graff, and Bob Uecker), and "Me and My Shadow", written by Billy Rose and Al Jolson (performed by Christopher Hewett in the journal scene near the end of this episode); First appearance of Robert Goulet.
33	4	"Kevin's Date"	Noam Pitlik	Tony Sheehan	October 24, 1986	5A07	12.5/21 (#48)
Kevin's 18th birthday is approaching, and he is apprehensive about his first sexual experience. Pressure from his friends does not help any when they suggest he take out a girl (Debbie Barker) who has a reputation for being easy. Kevin quickly finds himself in an uncomfortable situation when he takes their advice. Meanwhile, Wesley goes on a hunger strike, after refusing to eat his Brussels sprouts.: First appearance of Willie Garson as Carl.; ABC aired a Parental Advisory prior to this episode airing.; Debbie Barker (Paula Sweeney) also appeared in season 4's "Fall Guy".
34	5	"Halloween"	Noam Pitlik	Jeffrey Ferro and Fredric Weiss	October 31, 1986	5A08	11.9/20 (#52)
George is to become a member of The Happy Guys of Pittsburgh but on the night of the induction, which happens to be Halloween, George and Marsha discover the Happy Guys have a dark side. Meanwhile, Mr. Belvedere shows a different side after he goes wild toilet papering a house while trick-or-treating with Wesley.: Lucy Lee Flippin (Wilmadean) also appeared in season 6's "A Happy Guys Christmas" as Doris Putnam.; This episode has an extra journal scene.
35	6	"Deportation: Part 1"	Noam Pitlik	Frank Dungan and Jeff Stein and Tony Sheehan	November 7, 1986	5A01	14.8/24 (#43)
Wesley is all excited about getting a dog, but first he must do well on his history exam. When he gets an A, Wesley feels pangs of guilt and confides in Mr. Belvedere that he really cheated. Later, Wesley feels betrayed when Mr. Belvedere tells George and Marsha the truth and to get revenge calls the INS, who promptly arrest Mr. Belvedere, as he does not have a green card.: First taped episode that featured the opening credits from season 3, which was never used in syndication, but has been reinstated on Shout! Factory's season 3 DVD release.; Clips from this episode were featured in the season 2 episode of Ned and Stacey titled "Saved by the Belvedere", in which Christopher Hewett guest-starred.; The closing "journal entry" bumper in this episode is written by Wesley as Belvedere has been jailed pending deportation.
36	7	"Deportation: Part 2"	Noam Pitlik	Frank Dungan and Jeff Stein and Tony Sheehan	November 14, 1986	5A02	15.1/24 (#39)
Following his arrest, Mr. Belvedere is held in jail pending bail. When he is released, Mr. Belvedere returns to the Owens home, only to find another maid has taken his place. Meanwhile, Mr. Belvedere and the family try to come up with ways to keep him in the country and Wesley hatches a plan of his own by trying to find a woman who could marry Mr. Belvedere so he can get a green card.
37	8	"Reunion"	Noam Pitlik	Frank Dungan and Jeff Stein	November 21, 1986	5A10	13.2/21 (#48)
George and Marsha have conflicting events. George has a high school reunion and Marsha has a convention in Atlantic City and both places have things about them that are a bit tempting, gambling for Marsha and for George it's an old flame (Lee Meriwether) he once had a crush on and who's eagerly fanning it now. Meanwhile, Mr. Belvedere accompanies George to the reunion and must fend off the advances of a persistent woman.: Donna Flanigan is played by Lee Merriwether.; Norman Bartold plays a hotel clerk in this episode. Beginning in season 4, he would go on to have a recurring role as Skip Holdings.
38	9	"The Spelling Bee"	Noam Pitlik	Fredric Weiss and Jeffrey Ferro	December 5, 1986	5A11	12.5/20 (#53)
Wesley is competing in a spelling bee at school and one of his female opponents (Natalie Gregory) cozies up to him, but her intentions are hardly innocent. When Mr. Belvedere realizes what she is doing and tries to open Wesley's eyes, he refuses to see the obvious. Meanwhile, Mr. Belvedere puts the Owens family on a strict budget after their spending habits get out of hand and soon the family is champing at the bit to get cash.: VTR: November 14, 1986
39	10	"Pills"	Noam Pitlik	Gene Braunstein and Bob Perlow	December 12, 1986	5A09	11.8/19 (#58)
Heather has become convinced that she is fat and decides to try diet pills, but when Marsha discovers them, she confiscates them. At the same time, Marsha has been studying for an exam and that bottle of amphetamines may just be what she needs to keep her alert. Meanwhile, George and Wesley stake out the attic to catch a rat, but the rat might have the last laugh.: Featured song: "Land of 1000 Dances" (Marsha hums this song). It was originally written and performed by Chris Kenner, and popularized by Wilson Pickett in 1966 and the World Wrestling Federation wrestlers the previous year.
40	11	"College Bound"	Noam Pitlik	Jeffrey Ferro and Fredric Weiss	January 9, 1987	5A13	16.4/25 (#32)
Kevin has been looking at colleges and has even got some acceptance letters, but the schools he wants to attend are too expensive for the Owens family, so he quickly informs his family that he just wants to get out of the nest and away from their rules. Meanwhile, Mr. Belvedere is horrified at the prospects of teaching Heather how to drive after she receives her learner's permit.: This is the first episode where Kevin takes up a job at "Mr. Cluck's Fried Chicken".
41	12	"Inky"	Noam Pitlik	Frank Dungan and Jeff Stein	January 16, 1987	5A14	13.3/21 (#52)
Wesley is heartbroken when his pet hamster Inky dies, so to cheer him up, George and Marsha buy him a dog. However, little do they know, Wesley has faked Inky's death for the sole purpose of getting the dog. Meanwhile, one bathroom in the Owens' household has George and Marsha thinking of adding one to the house, and each member of the family has their own ideas for what the room should be used.: Featured songs: "Amazing Grace", sung by Marsha, and Mr. Belvedere singing "Rule, Britannia!"
42	13	"Jobless"	Noam Pitlik	Frank Dungan and Jeff Stein and Tony Sheehan	January 23, 1987	5A15	14.8/23 (#43)
Fired from his job, George decides to put his pride aside and finally decides to go down to the unemployment office, but George quickly finds himself the community hero, when he saves a woman from a mugger. The media attention leads the Owens' financial situation to become public knowledge and they find themselves swamped with gifts from the people in the community. Meanwhile, to help the household, Mr. Belvedere gets a side job.: Mary Gillis also appeared in season 4's "Foxtrot", and in season 6's "Fear of Flying".; Heather doesn't appear in this episode. This was the only taping Tracy Wells missed.; Jaleel White, who would go on to star as Steve Urkel in Family Matters makes a guest appearance as the boy giving a speech toward the episode's end.; Near the end of this episode, George announces that he is going to audition to be a sportscaster. This would lead to his debut as one in season 4's "TV George".
43	14	"The Ticket"	Noam Pitlik	Tony Sheehan	January 30, 1987	5A12	14.2/23 (#39)
Kevin gets a ticket after he goes through a stop sign but complains that he could not see the stop sign, due to a tree branch being in the way. This leads Marsha to test her knowledge at law and represent Kevin in court, but her attempts just get Kevin into more and more trouble. Meanwhile, Mr. Belvedere is after a raise, and George is dead-set against giving him one, and Wesley is having his fun blackmailing Heather.: Ben Piazza (Judge L. Nathan) also appeared in season 4's "Marsha's Job".; Ron Fassler also appeared in season 4's "Heather's Monk" as a mover.; Ami Dolenz guest stars as Kevin's date at the drive-in.
44	15	"The Crush"	Noam Pitlik	Fredric Weiss and Jeffrey Ferro	February 6, 1987	5A16	15.2/25 (#37)
Finding himself dateless on a Friday night, Kevin agrees to go to a Huey Lewis concert with Heather's best friend, Angela. However, this one date ends with Angela coming down with a serious case of puppy love, much to Kevin's dismay. Meanwhile, when George goes out of town with Marsha, Mr. Belvedere takes Wesley on a camping trip in the backyard, but Wesley gets an earful when Mr. Belvedere gets fed up with Wesley and begins talking in his sleep.: First episode to have a 1987 copyright date.; Instead of the episode ending with Mr. Belvedere writing in his journal in his bedroom, this episode ends with him writing in it in the outdoors by the campsite.; Later in this episode, Angela pronounces Mr. Belvedere's name right. He then acknowledges that this is the first time she has done that. However, she had previously pronounced his name correctly before in season 2's "Cheerleader".; Danielle Brisebois makes a guest appearance as Kevin's date.
45	16	"The Competition"	Noam Pitlik	Story by : Bob Perlow and Gene Braunstein; Teleplay by : Frank Dungan and Jeff Stein and Tony Sheehan	February 13, 1987	5A17	10.1/17 (#66)
Tired of George's smug face every time he beats him at arm wrestling, Kevin becomes determined to beat his father and has Mr. Belvedere coach him. Meanwhile, Heather begins dating the football jock (Micah Grant) who's been ordered to take ballet class by his coach. When he shows little interest in her, she begins to question his sexuality and he becomes convinced he is a homosexual.: First episode to feature the jazzier, big-band rendition of the ending theme.; Richard Doyle is a veteran voice-over actor. He also appeared in season 4's "Marsha's Job".; Due to the one-hour primetime special, Emmanuel Lewis: My Very Own Show, this episode premiered at a special time at 9:30 P.M.
46	17	"The Cadet"	Noam Pitlik	Jeffrey Ferro and Fredric Weiss	February 20, 1987	5A18	16.6/27 (#33)
Wesley keeps getting into trouble, both in school and at home, so George and Marsha decide on enrolling their son-gone-wild in the local military academy (where Wes discovers an untapped talent for spit-shining shoes). This does the trick only too well, and George soon decides that a straight-laced kid is even worse than a mischievous one. Meanwhile, Kevin's latest crush loves horseback riding; so, predictably, he takes up same. Even more predictably, he proves himself anything but tall in the saddle.
47	18	"Kevin's Older Woman"	Noam Pitlik	Frank Dungan and Jeff Stein and Tony Sheehan	February 27, 1987	5A19	15.8/25 (#35)
After a disastrous date, Kevin vows to give up women and he throws himself into his part-time job. However, one evening while working delivery, he meets an older woman (Kay Lenz) whom he instantly becomes smitten with which leads to him losing his virginity. Later, his parents are not exactly happy when they meet his new older girlfriend, and when they put their foot down, Kevin decides to move out. Meanwhile, Wesley journeys into the world of semaphore to earn a scout merit badge.: Kevin's "older woman" is portrayed by Kay Lenz who would go on to win an Emmy Award in 1989 on "Midnight Caller".
48	19	"Baby"	Noam Pitlik	Lisa Albert	March 6, 1987	5A06	14.1/23 (#37)
Marsha gets some unexpected news that she may be pregnant which brings back the feelings she had when she became pregnant with Wesley. Not wanting another baby, Marsha voices her feelings and says out loud that she did not want Wesley, unaware that he was standing behind her. Feeling unwanted, Wesley runs away. Meanwhile, Mr. Belvedere prepares to accept an award from Queen Elizabeth herself.
49	20	"Separation"	Noam Pitlik	Frank Dungan and Jeff Stein	May 1, 1987	5A21	11.8/22 (#47)
With George out of work and Marsha busy with law school, they have been spending little time together creating tension between the two. Soon fighting begins to erupt and Mr. Belvedere suggests that they try a marriage retreat but after a failed weekend at the retreat, they decide to separate, and George moves into an apartment. Meanwhile, Wesley, Heather and Kevin plot to get George and Marsha back together and Mr. Belvedere has a plan of his own.: An all-star lineup of guest stars show up in this episode to convince George to reconcile with Marsha. They consist of Susan Anton, Bubba Smith, Edwin Newman, Dr. Joyce Brothers, and Tony Danza.
50	21	"The Mogul"	Noam Pitlik	Frank Dungan and Jeff Stein and Tony Sheehan	May 8, 1987	5A22	10.7/21 (#50)
Wesley becomes a mini-mogul when he organizes a company that goes around the neighborhood doing odd jobs. The company starts off small, with just him and Miles as partners. However, when greed overwhelms Wesley, Miles is fired, leaving Wesley power hungry and taking advantage of his employees. Meanwhile, Kevin debates over taking Wendy to the senior prom or a more popular girl (Judie Aronson).
51	22	"The Auction"	Noam Pitlik	Fredric Weiss and Jeffrey Ferro	May 15, 1987	5A20	12.2/23 (#35)
For a charity auction at Wesley's school, Mr. Belvedere is talked into having his services auctioned off, but after his time is up, the lonely woman (Florence Stanley) who bid a whopping $500 for his time, sets into motion a bizarre scheme that begins when she drugs Mr. Belvedere and he wakes up to find himself bound and gagged. Meanwhile, Heather and Angela are running against each other for class treasurer and Wesley teams up with Angela to smear her competition.: Featured song: "Put 'Em In A Box, Tie 'Em With A Ribbon (And Throw 'Em In The Deep Blue Sea)", written by Jule Styne and Sammy Cahn

=== Season 4 (1987–88) ===
During this season, they alternated between Alan Bergmann, Michael Zinberg, Gerren Keith, Howard Storm, Don Corvan, Tony Singletary, and Tony Sheehan as directors, until it was decided that Don Corvan should be the new permanent director. The 4th season began airing on October 30, 1987, at 9:00 P.M., which was previously occupied by Max Headroom. The show would stay there until January 8, 1988. Afterwards, the show moved to 8:30 P.M., a timeslot that was previously occupied by I Married Dora (and was also its original timeslot during its first three seasons). The show would stay there until February 12, 1988. Lastly, on March 4, 1988, the show moved into the 9:00 P.M. timeslot, which was previously occupied by the sitcom The Thorns. This season featured two episodes that were held over until season 5 ("The Book" and "Black Widow"). During this season, George would finally get a job as a sportscaster, Marsha would finally graduate from law school and start a career as a lawyer, Kevin would enroll in College and get a new apartment, Heather would move on further in High School, and Wesley would graduate from Elementary school.

All 22 episodes of Season 4 (including the two leftover episodes that aired during season 5) were taped from June 1987 – February 1988.

List of Mr. Belvedere season 4 episodes
No. overall	No. in season	Title	Directed by	Written by	Original release date	Prod. code	Rating/share/rank (households)
52	1	"Initiation"	Michael Zinberg	Frank Dungan and Jeff Stein and Tony Sheehan	October 30, 1987	5M03	11.9/20 (#50)
Kevin has begun college and decides to join a fraternity, and part of his initiation includes donning women's clothing and also to bring the worst-looking girl (Cynthia Dale Scott) to a frat party. Coincidentally, Kevin meets a girl (Nancy Cartwright) who he thinks fits the bill, but wants to spare her feelings. However, he finds himself trapped, and hurting her feelings seems to be the only way out. Meanwhile, Wesley's school has a talent contest and Wesley takes up ventriloquism with a dummy that looks remarkably like Mr. Belvedere.
53	2	"TV George"	Alan Bergmann	Frank Dungan and Jeff Stein and Tony Sheehan	November 6, 1987	5M02	10.0/17 (#54)
George is excited about his new job as a sportscaster for a local television station, but his co-workers give him less than a warm welcome. Meanwhile, George does not mind being in front of a camera until upper management (Mark L. Taylor) tells him that to pull in the correct viewer segment, he should consider getting a facelift. Meanwhile, Wesley's secret agenda has him refusing to bathe but the family could not care less as he quickly begins to stink up the house.: Norman Bartold makes his first appearance in the recurring role of Skip Hollings.; Alberto Ybarra appeared once more in "Commentary", also in season 4.
54	3	"Triangle"	Alan Bergmann	Frank Dungan and Jeff Stein and Tony Sheehan	November 13, 1987	5M01	11.4/19 (#52)
Wesley has been spending a lot of time in detention and little does anyone know that he has been getting into trouble on purpose because he secretly has a crush on the detention supervisor, Miss Connors (Lisa Wilcox). His little plan to spend time with Miss Connors goes awry when Kevin stops by to pick up Wesley, and he hits it off with her and they begin dating each other. Meanwhile, Heather gets fed up with her name and decides she wants to go by Bianca.
55	4	"Marsha's Job"	Don Corvan	Liz Sage	November 20, 1987	5M07	10.3/17 (#57)
Marsha has been waiting for her letter from the Pennsylvania Bar Association with the news of whether or not she has graduated law school. The entire family is overjoyed when she finally does get the news that she passed. However, she quickly finds it difficult searching for a job in a law firm and when she is hired she finds herself dealing with her boss (Ben Piazza) who has anything but law on his mind when he begins making passes at her. Meanwhile, Mr. Belvedere begins a crash diet.: Richard Doyle's name is misspelled in the end credits as Richard "Doyal".; This episode marks the first time one of the Hufnagels appears on the show, but only his voice was heard, and was portrayed by Cliff Bemis. He also appeared in "The Apartment", also from this season.
56	5	"Moonlighting"	Gerren Keith	Frank Dungan and Jeff Stein and Tony Sheehan	November 27, 1987	5M04	9.8/17 (#57)
Mr. Belvedere encounters an insufferable girl named Brenda (Emily Schulman) while waiting in line at a fast food restaurant, and Mr. Belvedere soon realizes that her family needs him just as much as the Owens family does. Soon, the Owens family begins to see less and less of Mr. Belvedere and they discover that he has been moonlighting for the other family. It soon turns out to be an all out war between families over who gets to keep Mr. Belvedere.: Mari Gorman (Beatrice Bilinski) appeared on Mr. Belvedere again in season 5's "Hooky" as Doris.; Oliver Clark (Burt Bilinski) also appeared on Mr. Belvedere in season 5's "Hooky" as Lloyd.
57	6	"The Wedding"	Tony Singletary	Jeff Stein	December 4, 1987	5M08	11.3/19 (#48)
Kevin is excited when he learns that his old high school friend, Wendy, is coming to town for a visit and she has a surprise, she is engaged. Kevin feels a little disappointed when it appears that Wendy got over her crush for him and has moved on, or has she? And to make matters worse, Kevin decides to get everything out in the open during her wedding ceremony. Meanwhile, Mr. Belvedere may be in hot water when he accidentally lets Wesley's pet myna bird (voiced by Karen Hartman) fly out the window.: Walter Olkewicz (Allan) is reprised his role as Allan in season 5's "Really Full House".; Debi Monahan (Fawn) appeared again on Mr. Belvedere in season 5's "Fat Cats" as Ginger.
58	7	"Fall Guy"	Don Corvan	Doug Steckler	December 11, 1987	5M10	10.5/18 (#54)
Wesley is left home alone one evening: George, Marsha, and Mr. Belvedere have gone out to the opera; Heather has gone to the movies with Angela; Kevin has gone out on a date. The next morning, Marsha is furious when she discovers that her "Home Sweet Home" pillow has been destroyed. Wesley takes the fall for Kevin, whose drunken girlfriend (Debbie Barker) is the actual culprit; Kevin is worried that, if the truth gets out, George and Marsha will send back the car they promised him. The ruse ultimately wears thin, a la Rashomon, due to mounting evidence...but not before Wesley is placed in therapy by his parents (because they think he's experimenting with alcohol and pornography). The show ends badly for all three Owens siblings: Wesley's allowance is suspended to pay for the treatment he didn't need in the first place; George and Marsha present the new car to Heather instead of Kevin; Heather totals the car just by backing it out of the driveway.: VTR: October 23, 1987; Featured song: "Sixteen Tons", a few lines sung by Brice Beckham, as he is cleaning the fireplace.; Michael Goldfinger appeared on Mr. Belvedere again in season 5's "Stakeout" and season 6's "Truckin' and part 1 of the series finale.
59	8	"Christmas Story"	Don Corvan	Doug Steckler	December 18, 1987	5M11	11.3/19 (#52)
The Owens family begins to prepare their home for Christmas, but strangely Mr. Belvedere seems anything but in the Christmas spirit. Wesley sneaks into his room and discovers the perfect gift for Mr. Belvedere, but even that may not be enough to cheer him up. Meanwhile, both Kevin and Heather would like to be anywhere but home for Christmas, which leads to a family feud that just may lead to George and Marsha canceling the entire Christmas celebration.: First of two Christmas episodes that the show did, the other was "A Happy Guys' Christmas", from season 6.; Featured songs: "I Have a Little Dreidel" and "It's Beginning to Look a Lot Like Christmas", both sung by Brice Beckham, and an instrumental rendition of "Joy to the World".
60	9	"G.I. George"	Don Corvan	Jeff Greenstein and Jeff Strauss	January 8, 1988	5M06	14.3/23 (#44)
Wesley is trying to find someone he can use for his history assignment, someone who would be willing to speak in front of his class and talk about something they lived through. Wesley immediately volunteers George, whose Korean War stories awed him when he was younger, but he is now disappointed to learn that George had made them all up. Meanwhile, Marsha prepares the family for a family portrait, and Mr. Belvedere feels left out when he is not asked to appear in it.: VTR: September 18, 1987
61	10	"Kevin's Model"	Michael Zinberg	Jim Kearns	January 15, 1988	5M12	13.8/23 (#41)
Kevin is excited about his new semester in college and his friend Carl talks him into taking an art class. Kevin soon begins to fall for one of the female nude models (Krista Errickson) and they begin to get quite serious, but soon becomes uncomfortable with her posing nude and insists that she quit. Meanwhile, Heather tattles on Wesley when he breaks the Hufnagels' living room window using a slingshot, and he decides to take revenge by making her think she is going crazy.
62	11	"Commentary"	Michael Zinberg	Jack Carrerrow	January 22, 1988	5M13	13.0/22 (#43)
George is nervous when he is assigned to do editorials during his sports broadcasts at the television station. At first he is not quite sure what to do and starts off with something tame (protective sports gear), but quickly jumps to the controversial when he calls to eliminate the singing of the national anthem at sporting events. However, George's intention soon gets him in hot water as his opinion proves very unpopular and he finds himself being forced into doing humiliating jobs by the station manager (Pat Corley), who wants George to quit.: Michael Burger appears later in the series as a game show host in the season 6 episode "Brain Busters".; Maggie Han replaces Patti Yasutake as Tami in this episode.; Jim Poslof appeared again on Mr. Belvedere in "Black Widow".; Ernie Anderson is the announcer in this episode.; After this episode was made, Tony Sheehan stepped down from his role as Executive Producer.
63	12	"The Diary"	Howard Storm	Mitzi McCall Brill and Adrienne Armstrong	January 29, 1988	5M05	11.5/19 (#46)
Heather's 16th birthday is coming up and George is having a hard time dealing with his little "Kitten" growing up. Meanwhile, Heather is getting over a breakup with her latest boyfriend and creates a fictional man in her diary which George just happens to glance at and becomes worried especially after Wesley discovers birth control in Heather's room. Meanwhile, Wesley is searching for his lost snake, Captain Nemo, but little does anyone know that Kevin is responsible for his disappearance.: As of the taping of this episode, Liz Sage is now credited as "Supervising Producer".
64	13	"The Trip: Part 1"	Don Corvan	Frank Dungan and Jeff Stein and Tony Sheehan	February 5, 1988	5M16	12.6/20 (#51)
Heather and Angela have been volunteering at the nursing home again, and this time have befriended Mr. Sparks (Henry Jones), who has been spending time with a female resident. When she passes away, Mr. Sparks falls into a depression and the girls decide to honor his wishes and they break him out of the home and take him on a trip to Atlantic City. Meanwhile, George has a hard time coming up with a gift for Marsha for their 20th wedding anniversary, and Mr. Belvedere catches gambling fever and Wesley becomes his good luck charm.
65	14	"The Trip: Part 2"	Don Corvan	Frank Dungan and Jeff Stein and Tony Sheehan	February 12, 1988	5M17	11.3/18 (#55)
Heather, Angela, and Wesley head for Atlantic City with Mr. Sparks after breaking him out of the nursing home and hit up the first casino they see. Meanwhile, George and Marsha's second honeymoon is a bust, and they decide to high tail to Atlantic City as well, leaving Mr. Belvedere furious when he learns that Heather and Wesley have left the state. Kevin and Mr. Belvedere quickly hitch a ride with Robert Goulet, with their destination being Atlantic City and the stage is set for all parties to collide while Mr. Sparks has the time of his life.: Second appearance of Robert Goulet.; This episode marked the first time the show shot some scenes on-location, as opposed to always being indoors in a studio like before.; Featured song: "I Got You Babe", written by Sonny Bono
66	15	"Foxtrot"	Don Corvan	Doug Steckler	March 4, 1988	5M18	13.5.22 (#38)
Marsha and George go out dancing and Marsha decides that she would like to start taking dance lessons but when George decides he does not want to participate, Mr. Belvedere steps in and soon Marsha and Mr. Belvedere begin stepping out every night. Meanwhile, Heather and Wesley become convinced that Mr. Belvedere is falling for Marsha and try their best to get George to spend more time with her. Meanwhile, Kevin gets a job as a dishwasher at a sorority house and finds himself fending off every female in the house.: Featured song: Mr. Belvedere singing a few lines of "Love Is a Many-Splendored Thing", written by Sammy Fain and lyrics by Paul Francis Webster for the 20th Century Fox film of the same name.; When this episode aired, the show moved into the 9:00 P.M. timeslot, which was previously occupied by the sitcom The Thorns.
67	16	"Heather's Monk"	Don Corvan	Jim Kearns	March 11, 1988	5M20	9.8/16 (#51)
Heather and Angela join chorus, but neither one of them has a singing voice, though Heather has other things on her mind when she eyes an attractive senior (Robert Petkoff) who she asks out on a date. However, her romance gets the brakes when he reveals he is joining the seminary to become a priest, and Heather is in a state of shock when he asks to sleep with her days before he is scheduled to leave. Meanwhile, the family does their best with their free time when Wesley breaks the TV.
68	17	"Kevin Nightingale"	Don Corvan	Liz Sage	March 18, 1988	5M15	11.6/19 (#55)
George and Marsha get fed up with Kevin and his not making a decision on a college major. After some soul searching, Kevin finally makes up his mind, he decides on nursing and he quits his current part time job and gets one as an orderly at a hospital. George and Marsha are not convinced that this is what Kevin really wants to do. Meanwhile, Wesley becomes an efficiency officer and begins to manage Mr. Belvedere's time and Heather is not looking forward to a frog dissection in biology.: VTR: December 18, 1987
69	18	"The Apartment"	Tony Sheehan	Frank Dungan and Jeff Stein and Tony Sheehan	March 25, 1988	5M19	13.1/23 (#37)
One evening, Kevin brings home his date (Clare Carey) thinking he has the house to himself, only to discover George and Marsha making out on the couch. Fed up with having no privacy, Kevin decides to move into an apartment of his own and advertises for a roommate (Matt Maranian). His ad is answered in the form of Mr. Belvedere who got fed up with having no privacy of his own and barges in on Kevin. Meanwhile, the rest of the family fights over what to make out of Kevin's old room.: Matt Maranian makes his first of three appearances as Anatole, the others were in season 5's "Roommates" and "The Curse".
70	19	"Graduation"	Don Corvan	Liz Sage	April 29, 1988	5M22	11.5/20 (#43)
Wesley has been named valedictorian of his graduating elementary class, but days before the ceremony, Wesley plays a prank at a school dance and his classmates insist that he grow up. This leads Wesley to start wearing suits to school and begins acting more like an adult, which turns out to be a little too grown-up for his classmates. Meanwhile, Heather and George prepare for a father-daughter race but George finds it hard to keep up and Kevin thinks he saw a UFO and stakes out the backyard, ready for another encounter.
71	20	"The Counselor"	Tony Sheehan	Frank Dungan and Jeff Stein and Tony Sheehan	May 6, 1988	5M09	10.7/19 (#49)
Summer vacation has Heather taking summer classes, Kevin working overtime and Wesley going to a day camp. While at the camp, Wesley finds himself a victim when one of the counselors (Michael Horton) touches him inappropriately, leaving Wesley feeling guilty and scared and unsure if he should keep it a "secret" like the counselor encourages him to do. Meanwhile, George wants to golf but has no one to go with until Mr. Belvedere volunteers. However, George soon discovers that golfing with the butler may have been a mistake.: There is no journal entry by Mr. Belvedere in this episode, as the final tag scene instead features Christopher Hewett and Brice Beckham breaking character to perform a public service announcement about how to deal with and report child molestation.

=== Season 5 (1988–89) ===
During this season, Mr. Belvedere was one of the four original shows on ABC's then newly established TGIF block, which began during this season, along with Perfect Strangers, Full House, and Just the Ten of Us. Because of the 1988 Writers Guild of America strike, season 5, along with the rest of the 1988/89 primetime season, began in October. "The Book" and "Black Widow", two season 4 leftovers, aired during this season. After May 5, 1989, reruns of select episodes from select seasons aired in the 9:00 P.M. timeslot, until July 28. A week later, the show moved into the 8:30 P.M. timeslot. It would stay there until September 1, 1989. A week later, the show moved to Saturday nights at 8:00 P.M., and its original 8:30 P.M. timeslot was soon given to a new ABC sitcom called Family Matters. There were two episodes ("The Dinner" and "The Attic") that, for some reason, were shelved by ABC until syndication in 1990.

All 22 episodes of season 5 (not counting the two season 4 leftovers) were taped from August 1988 – March 1989.

List of Mr. Belvedere season 5 episodes
No. overall	No. in season	Title	Directed by	Written by	Original release date	Prod. code	US viewers (millions)	Rating/share/rank (households)
72	1	"Fat Cats"	Don Corvan	Frank Dungan and Jeff Stein	October 14, 1988	5V01	21.1	14.5/25 (#23)
George's manager at the TV station orders him to lose 15 pounds (6.8 kg), so George decides to go to a fat farm and brings Mr. Belvedere along for the excitement. However, they soon find themselves having a hard time sticking to the regime and when George sneaks pizza onto the premises and Mr. Belvedere gets blamed, both of them get kicked out. Meanwhile, Kevin baby-sits his girlfriend's quasi-feral cat that escapes and holds Marsha, Heather, and Wesley hostage, while totally destroying the house.: Fat farm moderator Roy Gallagher is played by James Cromwell.; Beginning with this episode, Jeffrey Ferro and Fredric Weiss are now credited as producers.; As of this taping, the Owens family household has new paint jobs, which stayed until the end of the run.
73	2	"Hooky"	Don Corvan	Frank Dungan and Jeff Stein	October 21, 1988	5V04	21.0	14.2/24 (#25)
George and Wesley have reasons for wanting to play hooky from work and school. Marsha does not buy either of their sick acts and sends them on their way. Later, George and Wesley each discover one another sneaking around the house, so they decide to play hooky together and go on a fishing trip. However, a last minute trip to the supermarket gets them into trouble when they run into Mr. Belvedere and two armed robbers, and soon find themselves front and center on the six o'clock news.: Note: Kevin (Rob Stone) does not appear in this episode.
74	3	"Braces"	Don Corvan	Tony Sheehan	October 28, 1988	5V02	19.1	13.2/22 (#39)
George is having a fit when he and Wesley must go to the dentist for a routine checkup, but when they come back Wesley is the one having the fit, as the dentist suggested he get braces. Worried that braces would ruin relationship with a girl Kimberly (Jenny Lewis), Wesley quickly comes up with a plot to try to avoid getting them, but his ill thought out plan does not fool Mr. Belvedere. Meanwhile, Kevin is trying to cut costs and Mr. Belvedere buys Kevin's old car and he does not know that Kevin's unloading a lemon.: VTR: September 2, 1988. During the taping, the cast and crew had a cake cutting ceremony, in commemoration of 75 shows.
75	4	"Pigskin"	Don Corvan	Frank Dungan and Jeff Stein	November 4, 1988	5V06	20.2	13.6/23 (#32)
Wesley is all set to join the football team but is in for a shock when the only girl on his team (Laura Jacoby) gets a position on the team while Wesley is a bench warmer. Wesley sets into motion a plan of sabotage that uses her crush on Wesley to his advantage and his plan seems to work when she quits the team, but Wesley fails to realize that she was actually an excellent player, while he falls short. Meanwhile, Heather and Angela try to find an act for a talent show but their constant bickering may be the end of their friendship.: In this episode, Jerry Supiran, who plays Jamie Lawson on Small Wonder, appears as Anderson.
76	5	"Marsha's Secret"	Don Corvan	Jeffrey Ferro and Fredric Weiss	November 11, 1988	5V07	18.5	12.2/20 (#32)
Marsha's position at the Legal Hut has been draining all the excitement out of her and when she is offered a higher position the entire Owens family is excited for her but she secretly decides to turn it down. Little does her family know, that she has quit altogether at the Legal Hut and has taken up a position as a singing waitress at a '50s style restaurant but Marsha's secretive behavior has George convinced that she is having an affair. Meanwhile, Kevin and Carl enter into a competition in an attempt to win a Ferrari.: Harvey J. Goldenberg also reprised his Mr. Hodnet role in season 6's "Homecoming".
77	6	"Duel"	Don Corvan	Frank Dungan and Jeff Stein	November 18, 1988	5V08	21.1	13.6/22 (#35)
Mr. Belvedere trips over a skateboard and falls down the stairs, he breaks his leg. The family seeks a temporary housekeeper and after a handful of disastrous interviews, one presents himself in the shape of Mr. Belvedere's dwarf cousin, Galen (David Rappaport), who's out for more than just a job and a friendly visit, he wants revenge. Meanwhile, Marsha is excited about a job interview and Kevin's latest girlfriend is furious with him when he gives her a bowling ball as a gift.: This was the last episode written by Frank Dungan and Jeff Stein.
78	7	"Roommates"	Don Corvan	Liz Sage and Doug Stickler	November 25, 1988	5V03	18.2	11.6/21 (#42)
Kevin has had it with his foreign-exchange student roommate, Anatole, who keeps a pet goat in the apartment. The last straw is when Anatole invites some friends over for a party and Kevin promptly tosses him out. Meanwhile, for a business class, Kevin observes the operations at a plumbing supplies company and meets a feisty woman (Eileen Seeley) whom he discovers that she lives next door to him. Meanwhile, Wesley's criticism of Mr. Belvedere's cooking leads to a cook-off.: First appearance of Eileen Seeley as Kevin's love Casey.
79	8	"The Curse"	Don Corvan	Liz Sage and Doug Stickler	December 2, 1988	5V05	18.5	11.4/20 (#51)
After Kevin kicks Anatole out of the apartment, a furious Anatole shows up at the Owens' door demanding a place to stay for him and his goat. However, the family gets fed up and demands he leave but before he does, he puts a curse on the family. Now the Owens family must deal with a string of bad luck and must find a way to break the curse. Meanwhile, Kevin is having no fun constantly bickering with his new roommate Casey, and soon discovers that there is a thin line between love and hate.
80	9	"Black Widow"	Don Corvan	Story by : Doug McIntyre; Teleplay by : Frank Dungan and Jeff Stein	December 9, 1988	5M21	17.7	11.8/20 (#44)
George is offered a guest appearance on a local talk show and the host, Barbara Collins (Lois Nettleton), becomes smitten with him. Later, George learns of her reputation for hiring attractive co-hosts and then luring them into bed. George is not worried at first until he finds Barbara throwing her weight around and squeezing him out of his sportscaster job and George finds himself trapped, which just may threaten his marriage. Meanwhile, a makeover from Heather has Wesley becoming a slave to fashion.: This episode was made for Season 4, but ABC held it back and aired it as part of Season 5.
81	10	"Homeless"	Don Corvan	Fredric Weiss and Jeffrey Ferro	December 16, 1988	5V10	19.1	12.0/21 (#45)
Heather and Angela volunteer down at a soup kitchen and Heather befriends a homeless man (Christopher Collins) who is being thrown out of the shelter because his two-week limit is up. This prompts her to bring him home with her and she hides him in the attic but living in such close quarters, the family soon becomes suspicious of what she is hiding. Meanwhile, Marsha wonders what George is hiding when a golf buddy of his dies while having sex, and George becomes scared the same thing might happen to him.
82	11	"New Year's"	Don Corvan	Tony Sheehan	January 6, 1989	5V11	25.6	16.1/25 (#31)
Wesley and Heather talk their parents into letting them throw a New Year's party and to get Mr. Belvedere out of the house they set him up with the Hufnagel's housekeeper, Ilsa (Rosemary Forsyth). However, the two of them begin to neglect their housework when they start spending all of their time together and Mr. Belvedere realizes that things are getting more serious than intended so he tries to fend off her advances. Meanwhile, Kevin becomes an unwelcome houseguest when he falls ill and Marsha becomes his personal nurse.: Rosemary Forsyth, who played as Ilsa Shoemaker in this episode, would later play the woman that Mr. Belvedere marries in the two-part finale.; This was the last episode written by Tony Sheehan. After this episode was made, never again would this show employ the same original writing team of Frank Dungan, Jeff Stein, and Tony Sheehan.
83	12	"Spot"	Don Corvan	Jay Abramowitz	January 13, 1989	5V12	24.3	15.0/25 (#34)
George comes home with a surprise for Wesley, something that Wesley had been wanting for years: a dog. Wesley is less than satisfied, as it seems he has gotten past that phase and does his best to ditch the cute little pooch. Meanwhile, Heather becomes friends with a mystic (Darcy Marta), which threatens her friendship with Angela. However, Angela decides to not take this threat lying down and suddenly seems to be able to speak from the spirit world.
84	13	"Anchors Away"	Don Corvan	Jay Abramowitz	January 20, 1989	5V09	21.3	13.5/22 (#38)
A new news director at the TV station is making changes and has George filling in for an ailing Skip who is having colon surgery. When Skip returns he finds himself out of his old job with George having become the permanent replacement and Skip's new job as host of a horror program is not as satisfying. Meanwhile, Heather tries to pay for the repairs of Marsha's car after she scratches it and asks Mr. Belvedere for a loan, but when she fails to pay it back, she becomes his slave.
85	14	"Stakeout"	Don Corvan	Liz Sage	February 3, 1989	5V13	23.6	15.2/24 (#32)
The town of Beaver Falls is stricken with fear with the Highheel Bandit on the loose and the neighborhood rallies together and forms a task force headed by two members of The Happy Guys of Pittsburgh club. This leads George, Kevin and Mr. Belvedere to stakeout the neighborhood even going as far as dressing in drag to serve as decoys for the ruthless bandit. Meanwhile, Wesley corrupts the young boy (Whit Hertford) whom Heather has been babysitting for, and the young man soon becomes an even bigger terror than Wesley.: Raleigh Bond's final project. He died eight months after the taping of this episode.
86	15	"The Election"	Don Corvan	Fredric Weiss (now credited as Ric Weiss)	February 10, 1989	5V16	20.8	13.5/22 (#39)
Wesley, running for student body president, is sure he will win because he does not have an opponent and he has a determined campaign manager named Miriam (Kellie Martin). At the last moment he gets an opponent in Billy Podell (Gabriel Damon), a paraplegic whose situation makes Wesley shy away from slander, but it does not shy Billy away from doing it to Wesley. Meanwhile, Mr. Belvedere hopes for a surprise birthday party even though he said he did not want a fuss and then becomes upset when the family obeys his wishes.
87	16	"Mutiny"	Don Corvan	Doug Steckler	February 17, 1989	5V14	23.1	14.8/24 (#32)
To celebrate their 21st wedding anniversary, George and Marsha go on a romantic cruise, but it turns out to be a cruise from Hell when they appear to have become passengers on a freight ship run by rough sailors. Meanwhile, Mr. Belvedere takes a sojourn to England to rub elbows with the Royal Family leaving Wesley and Heather at the mercy of Kevin, whose pushy roommate Casey barges in and takes over. Soon, Kevin, Heather, and Wesley begin to revolt against the strict Casey and try their best to bring Mr. Belvedere back as soon as possible.
88	17	"The Debate"	Don Corvan	Jeffrey Ferro (now credited as Jeff Ferro)	February 24, 1989	5V15	23.0	14.3/23 (#33)
Heather and Angela are members of a Speech club and a certain boy (Ben Cleaveland) catches both their eyes and they each set out to make him their boyfriend. The boy soon finds himself in the middle of the feud between friends and he must decide between one or the other. Meanwhile, Marsha redecorates Mr. Belvedere's room and Wesley and him become roommates but Wesley quickly becomes sick of Mr. Belvedere's constant practical jokes that he pulls on Wesley day and night.: Mr. Wiggins, the Debate Team moderator, is played by William Bogert, who played Brandon Brindle on Small Wonder.
89	18	"Really Full House"	Don Corvan	Liz Sage and Doug Steckler	March 17, 1989	5V17	21.4	13.7/23 (#37)
Kevin wants to take the next step in his relationship with his roommate Casey and move to a sexual one but just as they decide to take that step, they get an interruption in the form of Wendy and her husband (Walter Olkewicz) who pay them a visit and Wendy makes it known that she still lusts for Kevin and is trapped in a loveless marriage. Meanwhile, a hick family moves in down the street and they begin to torment Wesley, Heather, and George, while Marsha is preoccupied with putting together a case for a client.: This is the final appearance of Casey. The character is never mentioned again.; This is also the final appearance of Wendy in the series.
90	19	"The Book"	Don Corvan	Frank Dungan and Jeff Stein	March 31, 1989	5M14	20.6	13.2/23 (#38)
Mr. Belvedere decides to try to capitalize on his years of living with the Owens family when he goes through his journals to use as references on a book that he is writing. Once the book is published, no one in the family is pleased with the end result. Meanwhile, George discovers Marsha has been secretly saving money to buy a Porsche, and Kevin joins the pep squad in an attempt to meet girls, but ends up becoming the team mascot.: This episode was made for Season 4, but ABC held it back and aired it as part of Season 5.; Larry Gelman is best known for his role as Dr. Bernie Tupperman in The Bob Newhart Show. He also appeared again on Mr. Belvedere in season 6's "Fixed".
91	20	"The Escort"	Don Corvan	Pamela Kidwell and Laura Numeroff	April 14, 1989	5V20	20.5	13.5/24 (#34)
For some extra money, Kevin picks up a job as an escort and after having an encounter with a sexpot, Kevin meets a sweet old woman (Bibi Osterwald) whom he hits it off with and even begins thinking seriously of marriage when she proposes. Meanwhile, the Owens' monthly bills have got out of hand, and Mr. Belvedere suggests a strategy to curb the family's expenses.: On February 14, Bob Uecker suffered a mild heart attack while taping Mr. Belvedere. This explains why his George Owens character was completely absent for the next three tapings (this particular one, and the following episodes titled "The Dinner" and "The Attic").
92	21	"The Ghostwriter"	Don Corvan	Ric Weiss	April 28, 1989	5V19	19.9	13.2/23 (#36)
Wesley is trying to get the attention of a girl he likes and begins writing love letters to her. Meanwhile, Marsha and George's spring cleaning unearths some old love letters from an old flame and this prompts her to wonder why George cannot be that romantic. In response, George begins plagiarizing Wesley's poems. Meanwhile, Kevin and Mr. Belvedere become the repairmen for Kevin's apartment building.: VTR: March 17, 1989; As of this taping, Bob Uecker returns to the show after missing three episodes in February and March.
93	22	"Almost Heaven"	Don Corvan	Jay Abramowitz	May 5, 1989	5V18	22.1	13.7/24 (#33)
Wesley has been grounded to the house after yet another prank on the Hufnagels but he is determined to sneak out. When Mr. Belvedere discovers he is gone he goes after him and ends up in the hospital in a coma after wrapping Marsha's Porsche around a tree. Mr. Belvedere is then taken on an "angelic" journey of what the Owens' lives would be like without him.
94	23	"The Dinner"	Don Corvan	Jeff Ferro	1990 (Syndication)	5V21	N/A	N/A
Marsha begins cooking meals, but they always turn out inedible, to her family's horror. To help boost her self-confidence, Mr. Belvedere secretly substitutes her meals with his. However, things may blow up in his face when she plans to cook a meal for her boss (Hugh Gillin) and does not allow Mr. Belvedere in the kitchen. Meanwhile, Kevin's attempt at being a stripper nearly kills him.: Bob Uecker doesn't appear in this episode because of his heart attack.
95	24	"The Attic"	Don Corvan	Ric Weiss and Jay Abramowitz	1990 (Syndication)	5V22	N/A	N/A
Yet another prank on the Hufnagels prompts punishment for Wesley who is supposed to clean out the attic. However, he finds himself with some company, when he gets locked in with Mr. Belvedere and they recall (thorough flashbacks) what life has been like in the Owens' household since he moved in with the family.: Bob Uecker appears in this episode, but only in flashbacks. Once again, Uecker doesn't appear in this episode because of his heart attack.; This episode was a clip show. It consisted of select episodes from all the seasons made up until this point: 2 from season 1, 10 from season 2, 10 from season 3, 8 from season 4, and 7 from season 5. The following episodes were featured in this clip show: Stranger in the Night (the Pilot episode); Heather's Monk; Reunion; Debut; Deportation: Part 1; The Teacher; Speechless; The Apartment; Moonlighting; Stakeout; Duel; Initiation; Halloween; Grandma; The Dropout; New Year's; Foxtrot; Amish; The Book; Commentary; The Curse; Pinball; Gorgeous George; The Cheerleader; Almost Heaven; The Counselor; The Lion Sleeps Tonight; Delivery; Deportation: Part 2; The Auction; Fat Cats; Dinner for Two; The Thief; Kevin's Older Woman; The Debate; The Crush; The Play

=== Season 6 (1989–90) ===
This was the final season for Mr. Belvedere. Due to rapidly declining ratings (which already were not high to begin with), after 12 episodes, ABC quickly shelved the series, along with eight episodes. After much speculation that the show had been cancelled, ABC decided to arrange for a special airing of the two-part series finale on July 1–8, 1990 at 8:30 P.M. Part 1 of the series finale was co-directed by Rob Stone (who does not appear in it, but does appear in part 2) and Don Corvan. The eight episodes that ABC shelved would eventually make their debut in syndication in 1991.

All 22 episodes of the 6th and final season of Mr. Belvedere were taped from August 1989 – March 1990.

List of Mr. Belvedere season 6 episodes
No. overall	No. in season	Title	Directed by	Written by	Original release date	Prod. code	US viewers (millions)	Rating/share/rank (households)
96	1	"The Field"	Don Corvan	Ric Weiss	September 16, 1989	6V01	10.6	6.8/13 (#58)
George's birthday is coming up and the family is trying to find the perfect gift for him. Meanwhile, George has been coaching Wesley's baseball team and has been putting pressure on Wesley to be the best he can be which brings to light George's not-so great past as a baseball player.: Mickey Mantle, Reggie Jackson, Ernie Banks, Harmon Killebrew, Willie Mays, Hank Aaron, Johnny Bench, and Robert Goulet (his third appearance on the show) make guest appearances in this episode. This was the second (and last episode) of the series to feature an all-star cast.; Brice Beckham practiced for several weeks with a baseball coach to get in shape for this episode.; As of this episode, Jeff Ferro and Ric Weiss are now the supervising producers, and Liz Sage is now the co-executive producer.; The other episode that went on-location for shooting.
97	2	"Brain Busters"	Don Corvan	Ric Weiss	September 30, 1989	6V03	12.1	7.7/15 (#78)
George and Wesley are big fans of a TV game show called Brain Busters and apply to be contestants. When they go for tryouts, Wesley quickly learns he has a dud for a partner, so he dumps George and teams up with Mr. Belvedere. However, he quickly discovers himself going from one extreme to another.
98	3	"Truckin’"	Don Corvan	Liz Sage	October 7, 1989	6V04	13.6	8.8/17 (#68)
Investing in live commodities puts Mr. Belvedere in the money but George finds himself in something else when he does not sell off his share and ends up with a truck load of pigs. This leads him and Mr. Belvedere to drive the rig down to West Virginia to sell the swine, but they find that they like the trucker lifestyle, so they decide to make it their profession.
99	4	"Big"	Don Corvan	Jay Abramowitz	October 21, 1989	6V02	11.2	7.0/13 (#73)
Wesley is being harassed at school by some bullies and runs into some luck when another student (Jeff Rochlin) scares them off due to his body size. However, Wesley's savior turns into an annoyance when he begins hanging around all the time. Meanwhile, Kevin and Heather are in a battle of the sexes, and they drag George and Marsha into their fight.: VTR: August 24, 1989; First of 2 episodes that featured Seth Green as Louis, "Paper Mill" being the other.
100	5	"Fear of Flying"	Don Corvan	Doug McIntyre	November 4, 1989	6V07	10.6	6.7/12 (#83)
George reveals that he has a fear of flying, and Mr. Belvedere tries to cure him by talking on a ferris wheel ride. When that does not work, he enrolls him in a fear class, with classes being held in the Owens' living room. Meanwhile, Heather's psychology project has her dying her hair blonde, and she gets a jealous reaction from Angela.
101	6	"Paper Mill"	Don Corvan	Lee H. Grant	November 11, 1989	6V06	11.1	7.0/13 (#70)
Wesley becomes friends with a new kid, Craig (Andre Gower), and agrees to write a book report for him to help catch him up. This leads to word getting around, and all of Wesley's classmates come to him for papers. He quickly finds Craig coming to him for every paper he has to write, which leads to Wesley discovering that Craig cannot read. Meanwhile, Mr. Belvedere begins going crazy, when he is told that he cannot have any tea, due to an ulcer, and starts getting desperate to have a cup. The episode includes a nightmare sequence with George dressed as Mr. T.
102	7	"Homecoming"	Don Corvan	Jay Abramowitz	November 18, 1989	6V08	11.5	7.3/13 (#71)
With Homecoming days away, Heather finds herself considering being dateless, until she meets Keith Elliot (Jay Pickett), a star player on the football team and the ideal dream date for any girl to the Homecoming Dance. Too bad he's a rapist who tries to molest her. Meanwhile, Wesley is making a video about Mr. Belvedere's career, but he is having a hard time getting anything interesting.: Beginning with the taping of this episode, a newer, sped-up jingle accommodates the 1982 20th Century Fox Television logo that ended each episode.; VTR: October 20, 1989
103	8	"Fixed"	Don Corvan	Jeff Ferro	November 25, 1989	6V09	12.1	8.0/14 (#70)
Wesley's dog, Spot is running rampant and keeps following around the prize poodle of a neighbor (Marianne Muellerleile). George and Marsha order Wesley to take Spot to the vet to get neutered, but it quickly becomes apparent that Wesley did not listen to them, when a slew of puppies take over the Owens' household.
104	9	"Used Cars"	Don Corvan	Story by : Denny Sarokin; Teleplay by : Liz Sage	December 2, 1989	6V10	9.8	6.7/12 (#79)
Kevin gets a job at the used car dealership run by Carl's Uncle Phil (Johnny Dark). Kevin at first has a hard time getting into the selling business, but quickly becomes a natural crooked used-car salesman. Meanwhile, Mr. Belvedere receives a letter from the Queen expressing her desire to have Mr. Belvedere return to his previous position.
105	10	"Counterfeit"	Don Corvan	Jeff Ferro	December 9, 1989	6V05	10.3	6.7/12 (#82)
Wesley needs to take an additional class to fill up his schedule and decides on print shop but once he takes the class, he takes full advantage of the copy machines by making counterfeit money, which inadvertently gets into George's hands, and he spends the money all over town. Meanwhile, Kevin's apartment seems to be haunted calling for a seance.
106	11	"A Happy Guy's Christmas"	Don Corvan	Dennis Snee	December 16, 1989	6V12	11.6	7.0/13 (#75)
The Happy Guys of Pittsburgh are putting on their annual Christmas play and have decided on A Christmas Carol. The entire Owens family is cast, but when Mr. Belevedere gets frustrated with the poor directing, he takes over the job, only to quit in a huff. This leads to Mr. Belvedere being visited by the Ghost of Christmas Past, Present and Future.
107	12	"The Professor"	Don Corvan	Ric Weiss	December 30, 1989	6V11	11.2	6.8/12 (#70)
Kevin falls head over heels for his substitute professor Ann (Jane Leeves) and begins wooing her. However, he gets a shock when Mr. Belvedere hits it off with her and a jealous Kevin and Mr. Belvedere begin acting like jealous little kids battling over a woman. Meanwhile, George's idea of a family game turns into a gambling addiction for Marsha, Wesley, and Heather.: After this episode aired, ABC permanently canceled the series. They would then skip ahead to the two-part finale in July 1990.
108	13	"Love Fest"	Don Corvan	Doug Steckler	1991 (Syndication)	6V13	N/A	N/A
Belvedere advises George to try different venues for his romantic escapades to spice up his love life, but things quickly get out of hand; Kevin's disastrous date with a love-hungry German stewardess turns out to be the least of his worries when he finds out Heather is dating his friend Carl. Meanwhile, Wesley has big dreams for a cookie he creates with Belvedere's likeness.: Final appearance of Willie Garson as Carl.
109	14	"Donuts"	Don Corvan	Jeff Ferro	1991 (Syndication)	6V14	N/A	N/A
When the owner of Belvedere's favorite donut shop dies, he leaves his donut shop to him, which does not make Lou Anne (Armelia McQueen), his faithful employee, happy. When Belvedere bosses her, she quits, leaving him all alone to take care of the donut shop. When he spends too much time at the donut shop to take care of the Owens, they hire Lou Anne to help out. Belvedere hires Kevin to help at the shop, which only leads to disaster. Later they learn that there is another will, a video one, and in it he says that this was all part of the owner's plan to teach both Belvedere and Lou Anne lessons: Belvedere, who scarves donuts like there is no end in sight, to ease up; and Lou Anne, to value something. In the end, he gives Lou Anne 90% of the donut shop and Belvedere the rest.
110	15	"Runaways"	Don Corvan	Jay Abramowitz	1991 (Syndication)	6V15	N/A	N/A
Wesley gets a part time job at the donut shop, and immediately develops a crush on Lou Anne's daughter Sheila (Yunoka Doyle). When Lou Anne forbids their relationship and fires him, the love birds decide to run away together. Meanwhile, Belvedere realizes he has been stricken by a bout of the "Stonehenge Curse", which afflicts him every seven years and causes him to randomly change personalities.: Yunoka Doyle (Sheila) starred in a TGIF sitcom called Where I Live.; Featured song: Mr. Belvedere singing Three Little Fishies as "Fee Itty Fitties".
111	16	"The Pageant"	Don Corvan	Wayne Kline	1991 (Syndication)	6V16	N/A	N/A
Heather is a member of a feminist group at school, and they plan to make a statement against the Miss Beaver Falls Beauty Pageant. First they try to use Angela as a pawn, but when that falls through, Heather runs herself, but has second thoughts about sabotage. Meanwhile, George forgets his wedding anniversary.: Edd Byrnes (Kookie on 77 Sunset Strip) plays as the host of the pageant in this episode.
112	17	"The Baby"	Don Corvan	Dennis Snee	1991 (Syndication)	6V17	N/A	N/A
Marsha takes weekend custody of a baby named Nelson when an adoption arranged by her law firm falls through, causing havoc for the entire Owens household. However, she quickly grows a strong maternal attachment to the child and announces she wants to adopt it, without considering how it will affect her career.: Baby Nelson was played by a pair of twin brothers, Dylan and Samuel Gosland (standard practice due to California's Child Labor laws).
113	18	"Bad Marsha"	Don Corvan	Ric Weiss	1991 (Syndication)	6V18	N/A	N/A
Visiting a client in jail, Marsha comes face-to-face with Sharon Whit (Ilene Graff in a dual role), an exact Marsha lookalike. During their consultation, Sharon knocks out Marsha and switches places with her, leaving Marsha trapped in prison while Sharon moves into the Owens' household, although the Owens grow suspicious of her strange behavior, while Marsha desperately tries to convince the guards that she is not Sharon. When she sings a guard (Zelda Rubinstein) out of a hostage crisis, she returns home just as the family confronts her, thinking she is Sharon—just when she wakes up, a victim of a nightmare caused by anxiety about an upcoming criminal defense case.: Featured song: "Do-Re-Mi", written by Richard Rodgers (music) and Oscar Hammerstein II (lyrics) for the musical The Sound of Music
114	19	"Home"	Don Corvan	Wayne Kline	1991 (Syndication)	6V19	N/A	N/A
George and Marsha get fed up with things deteriorating in their home so they decided it might be time to sell the house and find a smaller one. However, soon everyone has second thoughts about moving when they get a glimpse at the potential buyers. Meanwhile, Kevin's elderly neighbor (Eve Smith) finds herself in a new home, a retirement home, put there by her son and daughter-in-law.
115	20	"Mumsy"	Don Corvan	Jay Abramowitz	1991 (Syndication)	6V20	N/A	N/A
Mr. Belvedere gets a surprise visit from his "Mumsy" (Sylvia Kauders) his elderly mother who has come over from England to stay with the Owens family. Mr. Belvedere is tired of her walking down memory lane and bringing up his past, something of which he seems ashamed. Meanwhile, Kevin is given George's old tool belt and soon finds an admirer (Barbara Alyn Woods) fawning over him strictly because of his belt.
116	21	"Mr. Belvedere's Wedding: Part 1"	Don Corvan and Rob Stone	Dennis Snee	July 1, 1990	6V21	10.2	7.0/13 (#59)
While at the laundromat with Wesley, Mr. Belvedere meets Louise Gilbert (Rosemary Forsyth), a nice woman whose work in the African jungle has temporarily been halted. They quickly hit it off, but when Mr. Belvedere fears that it may be getting too serious, he tries to brush her off by fooling around with a much younger woman. Louise confronts Mr. Belvedere; he reveals his fears, and they decide to get married.: Teresa Ganzel guest stars as Giselle Hufnagel, the only member of the Hufnagel family ever to appear on-screen.
117	22	"Mr. Belvedere's Wedding: Part 2"	Don Corvan	Beth Roberts	July 8, 1990	6V22	13.8	8.5/16 (#37)
After Louise and Mr. Belvedere announce that they're getting married, a case of cold feet has Mr. Belvedere running away, only to have George drag him back for his wedding. As Belvedere and Louise reach the altar, she breaks the news that she has been called back to Africa; Mr. Belvedere decides to go with her, saying goodbye to six years of working for the Owens family.: VTR: March 09, 1990; Fourth appearance by Robert Goulet; Christopher Hewett, Ilene Graff, and Brice Beckham were the only cast members to appear in all 117 episodes of the series.; The episode's very last scene (as well as the last scene of the series overall) is much like the last scene in most episodes, except it has Mr. Belvedere (now in Africa) writing a postcard to the Owens family. The series finale.

== Home media ==
At present, the first four seasons have been released on DVD by Shout! Factory, in three box sets.

DVD set	Episodes	Release date
Mr. Belvedere: Seasons One & Two	29	March 17, 2009
Mr. Belvedere: Season Three	22	September 8, 2009
Mr. Belvedere: Season Four	20	January 19, 2010
