= Mr. Belvedere =

American sitcom (1985–1990)

- Title card, from seasons 3–6
- Genre: Sitcom
- Based on: Belvedere by Gwen Davenport
- Developed by: Frank Dungan; Jeff Stein
- Starring: Christopher Hewett; Ilene Graff; Rob Stone; Tracy Wells; Brice Beckham; Bob Uecker
- Theme music composer: Judy Hart-Angelo; Gary Portnoy
- Opening theme: "According to Our New Arrival" (performed by Leon Redbone for 116 episodes) (performed by an unidentified studio vocalist for the pilot only)
- Composers: Jimmie Haskell (Pilot episode; music arranged and conducted by); Lionel Newman (music supervision; Pilot episode/seasons 1–2); Ben Lanzarone (additional music; seasons 3–6)
- Country of origin: United States
- Original language: English
- No. of seasons: 6
- No. of episodes: 117 (list of episodes)

Production
- Executive producers: Frank Dungan; Jeff Stein; Tony Sheehan (1985–87); Liz Sage (1989–90)
- Producers: Patricia Rickey; Jeff Ferro (1988–90); Ric Weiss (1988–90)
- Production locations: Sunset Gower Studios; Stage 77 Hollywood, California (Pilot and Season 1; 1985); ABC Television Center; Hollywood, California (Seasons 2–6; 1985–1990)
- Editors: Edward J. Brennan; Jessie Hoke; Don Wilson
- Camera setup: Videotape; Multi-camera
- Running time: 24 minutes
- Production companies: Lazy B/F.O.B. Productions; 20th Century Fox Television

Original release
- Network: ABC
- Release: March 15, 1985 – July 8, 1990

Mr. Belvedere is an American sitcom that originally aired on ABC from March 15, 1985, until its cancellation following the 107th episode on December 30, 1989. The network then shelved the remainder of Season 6. ABC aired the show's two-part series finale on July 8, 1990, a rare occurrence for a canceled program. The eight remaining episodes from Season 6 that the network shelved (bringing the final number of episodes to 117) would eventually air in syndication.

The series is based on the Lynn Aloysius Belvedere character created by Gwen Davenport for her 1947 novel Belvedere, which was later adapted into the 1948 film Sitting Pretty. The show stars Christopher Hewett as the title character, a butler for an American family headed by George Owens, played by Bob Uecker.

== Premise ==
The series follows posh English butler Lynn Belvedere as he struggles to adapt to the Owens household in suburban Pittsburgh. The breadwinner, George (Bob Uecker), is a sportswriter (in the pilot he worked in construction). His wife Marsha (Ilene Graff) is attending law school. At the show's start, older son Kevin (Rob Stone) is a senior in high school, daughter Heather (Tracy Wells) is a freshman and Wesley (Brice Beckham) is in elementary school.

Over the course of the series, George becomes a sportscaster (a career shared with Uecker, who balanced his role as the longtime play-by-play announcer for the Milwaukee Brewers while starring in the series), Marsha graduates from law school and starts a career as a lawyer, Kevin leaves for college and gets his own apartment, Heather moves up in high school and Wesley moves to junior high school.

Several episodes deal with the relationship between Wesley and Mr. Belvedere, who are always at odds, with Wesley constantly antagonizing Belvedere. Deep down, they are revealed to really love each other. Belvedere is the only one who can tame Wesley. Throughout the series, Mr. Belvedere serves as a mentor of sorts to Wesley as well as to the other children. Being a cultured man with many skills and achievements (having even once worked for Winston Churchill), he also helps the Owenses solve their dilemmas and avoid trouble. Each episode, except "Deportation Part 1" (Season 3) and "The Counselor" (Season 4), ends with Mr. Belvedere writing in his journal, recounting the events of the day (with audio narration) with the Owens family and what he has learned.

Belvedere's penchant for junk food is shown in many episodes. Another recurring gag features George always trying to be initiated into a local charity club called the Happy Guys of Pittsburgh. Wesley's acrimonious relationship with the never-seen next-door neighbors the Hufnagels (whose first names all began with the letter H) is another recurring plot element.

The series occasionally included very special episodes, such as Season 2's "Wesley's Friend", in which one of Wesley's classmates contracts HIV via factor VIII treatment for hemophilia.

== Production ==
=== Development ===
The character of Lynn Belvedere was originally created by Gwen Leys Davenport in her 1947 novel Belvedere. The following year, the title character was portrayed by Clifton Webb in the film Sitting Pretty, which told the story of an arrogant genius who answers an employment advertisement for a babysitter for three bratty kids. He accepts the job because he is secretly writing a novel about a community of gossips and busybodies. Webb earned an Academy Award nomination for Best Actor for his performance and reprised the role in two other films, Mr. Belvedere Goes to College (1949) and Mr. Belvedere Rings the Bell (1951).

Three previous attempts were unsuccessfully made to adapt the character to television: in 1956 with Reginald Gardiner, in 1959 with Hans Conried and in 1965 with Victor Buono. In 1985, ABC aired Mr. Belvedere as a mid-season replacement, with British actor Christopher Hewett playing Lynn Belvedere.

=== Location ===
The series' cocreators and executive producers Frank Dungan and Jeff Stein pitched the series as "a very elegant, very British sophisticate hired to restore order to a chaotic household in a Pittsburgh suburb", although neither had ever visited Pittsburgh, which was later named by Rand-McNally as the most livable in the U.S. The show was located in a highly fictionalized version of the real Pittsburgh suburb of Beaver Falls. The producers had learned of Pittsburgh locales from a promotional calendar provided by the Pittsburgh Media Group (PMG), a consortium of public officials and Western Pennsylvania media. Dungan and Stein used it for story ideas during Season 1 after the PMG pitched several studio groups in Los Angeles in January 1985: "The calendar has Pittsburgh scenes for each month. The Bridge of Sighs is February. The PPG Building is March. Three Rivers Stadium gets three months."

According to Dungan and Stein, Pittsburgh was chosen as the show's setting because "it was either Pittsburgh or Paris, and Paris doesn't have the Penguins ... we wanted someplace with seasons and sporting activity ... A city kinda going through a resurgence ... with character and traditions that is moving into the '80s, a blue-collar community that is moving into the up-and-coming, yet with the traditional spirit of the country. From everything we've read, Pittsburgh is moving into high tech." Stein also said: "We thought about setting the show in Cleveland, but that's too jokey. ... We're not doing Pittsburgh jokes. We like Pittsburgh. We like the Pittsburgh Steelers. That's a classy ballclub. And we like Willie Stargell." No scenes from the pilot nor from the first season's six episodes were shot on location, but the producers promised that "if we get picked up for fall [1985–86], we'll probably come to Pittsburgh."

== Cast ==
=== Main cast ===
- Christopher Hewett as Mr. Lynn Belvedere
- Ilene Graff as Marsha Cameron Owens
- Bob Uecker as George Owens
- Rob Stone as Kevin Owens
- Tracy Wells as Heather Owens
- Brice Beckham as Wesley T. Owens

=== Recurring cast ===
- Casey Ellison as Miles Knobnoster, Wesley's best friend, who is the frequent butt of jokes because of his orthodontic headgear.
- Michele Matheson as Angela Shostakovich, Heather's dimwitted best friend who always mispronounces Mr. Belvedere's name. Her middle name was given as Raskolnikov in one episode.
- Raleigh Bond as Burt Hammond, bombastic and overly talkative chief spokesman and membership director for the Happy Guys of Pittsburgh, a local men's club who is always trying to recruit George as a member.
- Jack Dodson as Carl Butlam, Mr. Hammond's obsequious assistant.
- Winifred Freedman as Wendy, Kevin's geeky and self-conscious high-school friend who has a crush on him.
- Robert Goulet, singer and actor, who plays himself and occasionally sings duets with Marsha. George finds him to be irritating.
- Norman Bartold as Skip Hollings, George's fellow anchor at the television station.
- Willie Garson as Carl, Kevin's best friend, who often drags Kevin into his schemes.
- Patti Yasutake (or by Maggie Han in some episodes) as Tami, one of George's fellow anchors at the television station.
- Laura Mooney as Marjorie, Wesley's classmate and love interest during the final season.

== Episodes ==
Season	Episodes	Originally released	
Season	Episodes	First released	Last released
1	7	March 15, 1985	April 26, 1985
2	22	September 27, 1985	March 28, 1986
3	22	September 26, 1986	May 15, 1987
4	20	October 30, 1987	May 6, 1988
5	24 (Note: Episodes 23–24 of season 5 only aired in syndication.)	October 14, 1988	May 5, 1989
6	22 (Note: Episodes 13–20 of season 6 only aired in syndication.)	September 16, 1989	July 8, 1990

Broadcast history

- March 1985–April 1985, ABC Friday 8:30–9:00
- August 1985–March 1987, ABC Friday 8:30–9:00
- May 1987–September 1987, ABC Friday 8:30–9:00
- October 1987–January 1988, ABC Friday 9:00–9:30
- January 1988–February 1988, ABC Friday 8:30–9:00
- March 1988–July 1989, ABC Friday 9:00–9:30
- August 1989–September 1989, ABC Friday 8:30–9:00
- September 1989–December 1989, ABC Saturday 8:00–8:30
- July 1990, ABC Sunday 8:30–9:00

== Theme song and opening sequence ==
The show's theme song, "According to Our New Arrival", was performed by ragtime singer Leon Redbone. It was written by Judy Hart-Angelo and Gary Portnoy, who also cowrote the theme songs for Cheers and Punky Brewster. In the original unaired pilot, an unidentified studio vocalist sang the theme.

The song was composed in 1984 for a rejected television pilot called Help (which was later resurrected in 1987 as Marblehead Manor, produced by Paramount Television and aired in first-run syndication). With a minor lyrical rewrite (changing the word "arrivals" to "arrival"), it quickly became the theme song for Mr. Belvedere. In 2007, Portnoy released a full-length version of the theme on his album Destiny.

The show used four different closing themes during its original run:

1. The unaired pilot and early ABC promos used a rock version of the main theme with a guitar lead.
2. Seasons 1 and 2 and one Season 3 episode featured an instrumental version of the theme song.
3. Season 3 featured a Dixieland rendition of the ending theme.
4. Seasons 4–6 employed a jazzier rendition of the ending theme.

=== Opening credits ===
==== First version (pilot) ====
This sequence consisted of a purple family portrait book, with pictures of the cast (including a picture of George at his construction job), set to the original version of theme song. This version was only used on the original unaired version of the pilot; the broadcast version used the second variation.

==== Second version (Season 1) ====
Similar to the original unaired pilot, but now with a beige family portrait book, some of the cast pictures changed (most notably, George at his construction job), with Redbone singing the theme. The Redbone version would be used in all subsequent variations of the opening.

==== Third version (Season 2) ====
The opening was overhauled for this season. It begins with a stock photo of a British palace and then zooms into Mr. Belvedere. It was then followed by Belvedere as different people (including a man on safari), followed by photos and clips from Season 1 episodes, as well as general photos of the cast from that season.

==== Fourth version (Seasons 3–6) ====
The opening was overhauled once more for Season 3 to begin with Mr. Belvedere writing in his journal, followed by the camera zooming in on the fictional World Focus magazine, with Belvedere on the front cover for the title card. It was then followed by edited images of Belvedere with famous people from around the world. The photos were updated to reflect how the cast looked in Season 3, and most of the Season 1 clips were replaced with scenes from Season 2 episodes. In Season 4, the opening was updated to feature new photos of Tracy Wells on the couch. In Season 6, it was updated once more to feature clips from Season 5 episodes and new photos of Brice Beckham on the couch. A 30-second version was also created. In early syndication reruns, the short Season 4/5 opening was used for all episodes, with the exception of Season 6 episodes; early reruns of Season 6 used the short opening from that season.

== Ratings and cancellation ==
Mr. Belvedere did not place within Nielsen's Top 30 shows at any time during its six-season run, but it did have a relatively solid ratings base and often won its time slot. Its first season (1985) was exempt from the Nielsen ratings as it aired too few episodes before the end of April to be counted. In its second season (1985–86), the series ranked at #45 with a 14.8 rating.

During Season 3 (1986–87), the show fell to 51st place with a 13.7 rating. At the end of the 1986–87 season, ABC canceled the show after three seasons, but negative fan feedback caused the network to reverse its decision and order a fourth season that debuted in October 1987. In Season 4 (1987–88), the show fell to 64th place and an 11.5 rating for the year. For its fifth season (1988–89), the show rose to a 12.2 rating, placing it at #47 for the season.

For its sixth and final season (1989–90), Mr. Belvedere left its longtime Friday night slot (which began its evolution into the long-running TGIF block that season) and was moved to 8:00 p.m. Eastern Time on Saturday nights. The move led Mr. Belvedere to suffer a steep ratings decline, falling to a 6.3 rating. The final episode to air before the show was placed on hiatus on December 30, 1989 ranked #70 out of 83 shows. ABC canceled the series permanently in February 1990. The two-part finale, which aired on July 1 and July 8, 1990, ranked #59 and #37, respectively, of the 86 shows that aired during those weeks.

== Syndication ==
In addition to its prime-time airings of Mr. Belvedere, ABC aired reruns of the first three seasons during daytime from September 7, 1987 to January 15, 1988, filling the gap between the cancellation of the game show Bargain Hunters and the premiere of the talk show Home.

On September 11, 1989 (near the start of the show's final season) and continuing sporadically until 1997, the show was seen in local syndication on select Fox affiliates. Along with the addition of Seasons 4 through 6, ten previously unaired episodes (two from Season 5 and eight from Season 6), were also added to the syndication package. The syndication package initially consisted of all 95 half-hour episodes produced until the end of Season 5 in 1989. The following year, Season 6 (the remaining 22 half-hour episodes) was finally included in the package.

In the early 2000s, reruns of the series aired on Foxnet and on CTS in Canada from 2002 to 2004.

In October 2011, reruns began airing on FamilyNet, marking the first time that the series had been regularly syndicated in more than 15 years. Around November 2012, Dish Network began broadcasting FamilyNet's successor channel, Rural TV, making the show viewable throughout the U.S. on weeknights (with commercial bumpers intact briefly). On January 5, 2015, Antenna TV began airing unedited reruns of the series (but with the alternate pilot credits without Leon Redbone singing), initially airing seven days a week until April 2018.

== Home media ==
Shout! Factory (under license from 20th Century Fox Home Entertainment) has released the first four seasons of Mr. Belvedere on DVD in Region 1, featuring the original unedited prints of the episodes. Currently, Shout! Factory does not have the DVD rights to Seasons 5 and 6 and has been involved in protracted negotiations to acquire those 46 remaining episodes for future releases.

In September 2015, Shout! rereleased Season 4 on DVD as a full retail release.

DVD name	Ep#	Release date	Special features
Seasons One & Two	29	March 17, 2009	New interviews with Bob Uecker, Ilene Graff, Rob Stone and Brice Beckham; "The Guy who Plays Mr. Belvedere Fanclub" sketch from Saturday Night Live with Tom Hanks from 1992
Season Three	22	September 8, 2009	Six audio commentaries with Ilene Graff, Rob Stone, Tracy Wells and Brice Beckham ("Debut", "Kevin's Date", "Pills", "The Crush", "The Competition", "Kevin's Older Woman")
Season Four	20	January 19, 2010; September 8, 2015 (re-release)	Episode promos created for the syndication package

== Awards and nominations ==
Year	Award	Result	Category	Recipient
1985	Primetime Emmy Award	Won	Outstanding Lighting Direction (Electronic) for a Series	George Spiro Dibie (For episode "Stranger in the Night")
1986	Young Artist Awards	Nominated	Best New Television Series – Comedy or Drama	–
1986	Young Artist Awards	Nominated	Best Young Supporting Actor in a New Television Series	Brice Beckham
1986	Young Artist Awards	Won	Best Young Actress Starring in a New Television Series	Tracy Wells
1987	Young Artist Awards	Nominated	Exceptional Performance by a Young Actress, Starring in a Television, Comedy or Drama Series	Tracy Wells
1987	Young Artist Awards	Nominated	Exceptional Performance by a Young Actor Starring in a Television Comedy or Drama Series	Brice Beckham
1988	Young Artist Awards	Nominated	Best Family Comedy Series	–
1988	Young Artist Awards	Nominated	Best Young Female Superstar in Television	Tracy Wells
1988	Young Artist Awards	Nominated	Best Young Male Superstar in Television	Brice Beckham
1989	Young Artist Awards	Nominated	Best Young Actress Guest Starring in a Drama or Comedy Series	Laura Jacoby (For episode "Pigskin")
1989	Young Artist Awards	Nominated	Best Young Actress – Starring in a Television Comedy Series	Tracy Wells
1989	Young Artist Awards	Nominated	Best Young Actor – Starring in a Television Comedy Series	Brice Beckham
1989	Young Artist Awards	Nominated	Best Family Television Series	–
2004	TV Land Award	Nominated	Best Broadcast Butler	Christopher Hewett

== See also ==
- Charles in Charge (1984)
- Gimme a Break! (1981)
- Who's the Boss? (1984)
