= Doro Merande =

American actress

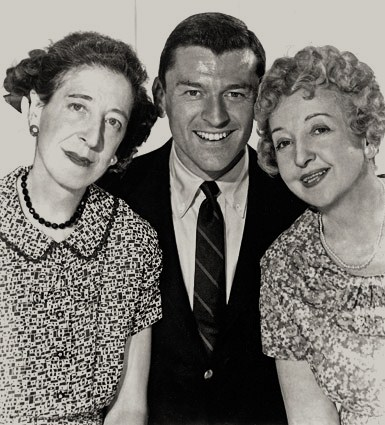
- Doro Merande, Frank Aletter, and Enid Markey in the sitcom Bringing Up Buddy (1960-1961).
- Born: Dora Matthews; March 31, 1892; Columbia, Kansas, U.S.
- Died: November 1, 1975 (aged 83); Miami, Florida, U.S.
- Occupation: Actress
- Years active: 1921 – 1975

Dora Matthews (March 31, 1892 – November 1, 1975), better known by her stage name Doro Merande, was an American actress who appeared in film, theater, and television.

== Early years ==
Merande was born on March 31, 1892 in Columbus, Kansas. She was the daughter of William Freeman Matthews (1849 – 1915) and Emma Adelia Matthews (née Simkins; 1855 – 1930), and the youngest of three children. Merande said her family discouraged her interest in the theater as a child, telling her she had a flat voice and calling the industry "wicked."

== Stage actress ==
Merande found her first part in a small summer company in Massachusetts. She coveted Broadway parts during the Great Depression. Her career began with the Jules Levanthal Company.

She appeared on Broadway using her birth name in That Ferguson Family (1928) and Montmartreas (1922). Her first Broadway appearance as Doro Merande was as "Sophie Tuttle" in Loose Moments in 1935. Soon she was cast in One Good Year, Red Harvest, and Angel Island. Her first major stage role was playing the gossip in Our Town by Thornton Wilder repeating her performance in the 1940 film. Merande later appeared with Leo G. Carroll in Lo and Behold, The Rat Race with Betty Field, and in The Silver Whistle, with Jose Ferrer. She performed with Clifton Webb (in Mr. Belvedere Rings The Bell), Walter Huston (in Apple of His Eye), and Franchot Tone (in Hope for Your Best).

Her final Broadway appearance was in the 1969 revival of The Front Page, in which she portrayed the cleaning woman, as she later also did in the 1970 television and the 1974 film version. The 1974 film version was her final appearance; she was directed by Billy Wilder, with whom she had previously worked in the films The Seven Year Itch (1955) and Kiss Me, Stupid (1964).

== Filmography ==
Merande appeared onscreen in bit parts starting in the early 1930s and had her first substantial role in 1940, reprising her role as the gossip in the film adaptation of Our Town.

=== Films ===
- Interference (1928) - Deborah's Maid (uncredited)
- Personal Maid (1931) - Mrs. Wurtz's Maid (uncredited)
- Wayward (1932) - Maid (uncredited)
- State Fair (1933) - Mrs. Metcalfe's Acquaintance at Food Contest (uncredited)
- Bondage (1933) - Boarding House Matron (uncredited)
- Zoo in Budapest (1933) - Miss Fennock, Orphanage Assistant (uncredited)
- Moonlight and Pretzels (1933) - Hymn-singing Lady (uncredited)
- Navy Wife (1935) - Nurse Sharpe (uncredited)
- Bad Boy (1935) - Mrs. Jackson (uncredited)
- The Star Maker (1939) - Gerry Society Woman
- Our Town (1940) - Mrs. Soames
- The Snake Pit (1948) - Inmate, First Lady of the Land (uncredited)
- Cover Up (1949) - Hilda
- Mr. Belvedere Rings the Bell (1951) - Mrs. Hammer
- The Whistle at Eaton Falls (1951) - Miss Pringle
- The Seven Year Itch (1955) - Waitress at Vegetarian Restaurant (uncredited)
- The Man with the Golden Arm (1955) - Vi
- The Remarkable Mr. Pennypacker (1959) - Miss Haskins (uncredited)
- The Gazebo (1959) - Matilda
- The Cardinal (1963) - Woman Picket
- Kiss Me, Stupid (1964) - Mrs. Pettibone
- The Russians Are Coming, the Russians Are Coming (1966) - Muriel Everett
- Hurry Sundown (1967) - Ada Hemmings
- Skidoo (1968) - The Mayor
- Change of Habit (1969) - Rose
- Making It (1971) - Librarian
- The Front Page (1974) - Jennie (final film role)

=== Television ===
- Valiant Lady (1953) - Ivy Harper (1956-1957)
- Kraft Television Theater (1953–1954)
- The United States Steel Hour (1957) - Felice
- Steve Canyon (1958) - Mrs. Turtin
- Alfred Hitchcock Presents (Episode: "Mrs. Herman and Mrs. Fenimore", with Mary Astor, 1958) - Mrs. Herman
- The Phil Silvers Show (1959) - Assistant USO Hostess / Mrs. Whitcomb
- Playhouse 90 (1959) - Miss Hammer / Mrs. Adolph
- New Comedy Showcase (1960, Episode "The Trouble with Richard") - Aunt Julia
- Bringing Up Buddy (CBS sitcom, 1960–1961) - Aunt Iris Flower
- Thriller (1961) - Melba Pennaroyd
- The Defenders (1962) - Augusta Mills
- Sam Benedict (1963) - Elizabeth Campbell
- The Twilight Zone (1963, Episode: "The Bard") - Sadie
- That Was the Week That Was (TW3) (NBC satirical revue, 1964; she appeared in numerous episodes, notably with Margaret Hamilton as quirky New Hampshire voters during the year's presidential election campaign.)
- The Jackie Gleason Show (1966–1970) - Emma Beauregard

== Death ==
In the evening of October 30, 1975, Merande was at the Olympia Theater in Miami, Florida when she suffered either a stroke or a heart attack and collapsed. She died two days later, on November 1, 1975, at Jackson Memorial Hospital. Though Merande lived on 39th Street in Manhattan, New York City, she'd traveled to Florida to film the 25th anniversary television special of The Honeymooners with Jackie Gleason. She was reportedly cremated.

Merande never publicly disclosed her age, which led to some discrepancies when news outlets reported her death; some publications reported she was 65 while The New York Times estimated her to be in her 70s. She was 83.

Merande was never reported to have married or had children, and her parents and siblings predeceased her.
