= Driving Academy =

Driving Academy may refer to:

- A school that teaches driving training and road safety; see driver's education
- Crash Course (film), a 1988 American film also known as Driving Academy
