= Gwen Davenport =

American comic novelist

- Born: October 3, 1909; Colón
- Died: March 23, 2002; Louisville
- Education: Vassar College
- Occupations: Novelist, playwright

Gwen Leys Davenport (October 3, 1909 – March 23, 2002) was an American comic novelist.

Gwen Leys was born on October 3, 1909, in Colón in the Panama Canal Zone, the daughter of Vice Admiral James Farquharson Leys, a surgeon with the United States Navy, and Gwen Wigley Leys. She graduated from Vassar College in 1931. In 1937, she married stockbroker John Davenport and they settled in his hometown of Louisville, Kentucky. They had three children.

She is best known for the comic novel Belvedere (1947), about an eccentric, self-absorbed writer named Lynn Belvedere who goes to work for a suburban family during World War II. It inspired a trio of films starring Clifton Webb, Sitting Pretty (1948), Mr. Belvedere Goes to College (1949), and Mr. Belvedere Rings the Bell (1951), and a television series starring Christopher Hewett, Mr. Belvedere (1985–1990).

Gwen Davenport died on March 23, 2002, in Louisville.

== Bibliography ==
- A Stranger and Afraid, Bobbs-Merrill (New York, NY), 1943.
- Return Engagement, Bobbs-Merrill, 1946.
- Belvedere, Bobbs-Merrill, 1947.
- Family Fortunes, Doubleday, 1949.
- Candy for Breakfast, Doubleday, 1950.
- The Bachelor's Baby, Doubleday (Garden City, NY), 1958.
- The Tall Girl's Handbook, illustrated by Polly Bolian, Doubleday, 1959.
- The Wax Foundation, Doubleday, 1961.
- Great Loves in Legend and Life, F. Watts (New York, NY), 1964.
- Time and Chance, Donald I. Fine, 1993.
