= Debbie Barker =

American actress

Debbie Barker is an American model, television/stage actress, and businesswoman. Her best-known work includes two unrelated appearances on the sitcom Mr. Belvedere and a supporting part in the television film The Stepford Children.

Beginning with a small, uncredited role on Ryan's Hope, Barker appeared on various television series between 1986 and 1994. These include Matlock (Season 4, Episode 84: "The Student"), Alien Nation, They Came from Outer Space, Rags to Riches, Down and Out in Beverly Hills and Night Court. She co-starred in the 1988 direct-to-video movie Wolfpack and portrayed Jill St. John in the television film Poor Little Rich Girl: The Barbara Hutton Story.
