= Terminal Entry =

- Directed by: John Kincade
- Screenplay by: David Mickey Evans & Mark Sobel
- Story by: Mark Sobel
- Produced by: Sharyon Reis Cobe
- Starring: Paul Smith; Yaphet Kotto; Heidi Helmer; Patrick Labyorteaux; Yvette Nipar; Rob Stone; Sam Temeles; Jill Terashita; Kabir Bedi; Tracy Brooks Swope; Edward Albert
- Cinematography: James L. Carter
- Edited by: Dean Goodhill
- Music by: Gene Hobson
- Production companies: Intercontinental Releasing Corporation; Sandy Cobe Presents; In Association with TBA Film A/S; A Sharyon Reis Cobe Production
- Distributed by: Celebrity Home Entertainment
- Release date: 1987
- Running time: 98 minutes
- Country: United States
- Language: English

Terminal Entry is a 1987 American science fiction film directed by John Kincade, written by Mark Sobel, and starring Paul Smith, Yaphet Kotto, Heidi Helmer, Patrick Labyorteaux, Yvette Nipar, Rob Stone, Sam Temeles and Jill Terashita with guest stars Kabir Bedi, Kavi Raz, Mazhar Khan, Tracy Brooks Swope and Edward Albert.

The films is about: The USA are attacked by a large group of well organized terrorists who communicate through a computer network via satellite. A bunch of highschool kids has hacked the password and gained access. They believe it's a game and unknowingly cause terror acts all over the country. An anti-terror force fights against the terrorists.

== Plot ==
The film begins with Lady Electric and Bob. After being chased down another corridor and into an elevator where they both fall to their deaths Bob snaps out of his daydream at the last second. When he comes to, he finds his friends have lost the game in the same fashion. Later, when selecting another game to play on the "Outlaw BBS", they chose one called "Terminal Entry", however, this one is password protected. Thinking that the game was set up by members at MIT, Tom decides that he will crack the password and play it during a vacation planned up in the mountains for the weekend.

Colonel Styles and Captain Jackson inform General Stewart of the terrorist situation and request more men to help protect the border over a video conference. But the general is not convinced, so he decides to fly out and take command personally. The terrorist network commander watches a news cast on the television where General Stewart being interviewed by Dominique, the reporter who is also the love interest of Captain Jackson, and decides to place a hit on the general. But the plan was circumvented by Captain Jackson while escorting the general to his hotel.

Back at the dorm room, thinking they have been beaten again, the Caltech students just about give up on their game "Dr. Fly", when Gwen, a friend of Chris who was invited to the weekend retreat, beats the game with a single command. Meanwhile, the terrorist commander is reminded by his leader over another video conference the stakes of their operation and is given an initiation time frame for their coordinated attack. The Army unit makes progress in finding the communication network for the terrorist by locating the bulletin board system after searching through known listings. When they find the terrorist network they pose as Hassan, the terrorist they killed earlier, but Dan Jackson was distraught about being given the order to have his girlfriend Dominique assassinated.

During the weekend getaway, the teenage "hackers" fail to gain access to "Terminal Entry" through brute force password cracking, however when Bob drops one of his Twinkies on the keyboard, he enters the numbers "5.9.125.35 1/5.25.35" which was the same numbers as the measurements Lady Electric from the beginning of the movie had said to him. Upon gaining access, the group find a complex computer program which they think is a game.

The Army anti-terrorism unit tracks down the position of the terrorist command post, and initiate an assault on the location which is a warehouse in the middle of the desert. Before the commander escapes, he assigns the six students to take over command. When the students start playing the game, the commands they issue in play erupt in real life bombings, assassinations, and acts of terrorism. Some of which include a Russian peace delegate, an oil refinery in Los Angeles, airplanes flying in from Lisbon, and themselves.

Bob, not knowing the full impact of their influence, put the six of them on the hit list. Operator 23 was already dispatched before they could countermand the assignment. Coincidentally their car wouldn't start, so Bob leads the group back into the house to arm themselves. When night fell, a large group of terrorists descended upon the house. However, the anti-terrorist unit was one step ahead of the terrorists, and rescued the kids from their impending doom, then proceeded to eradicate the terrorist threat. During the fighting, Bob coaxed by his imagination, the voice in his head of Lady Electric, told him to go back inside to put his initials into the computer as the winner. At the end, even with the terrorists defeated, and the kids safe, Captain Jackson and Colonel Styles know the war is not over.

== Reception ==
The film received mixed reviews. The Fort Worth Star-Telegram called it a "cracking-good actioner". While acknowledging that the film suffered from "a severe case of low budgetitis", critic Michael H. Price argued that its "exciting pace" and "solid" acting made up for it.

An ironic review in the Houston Chronicle said, "Terminal Entry sure has a lot to recommend it, like fading near-stars Edward Albert and Yaphet Kotto bravely acting in parts with no discernible character." The review went on to suggest that the story line probably took only one week to develop.

== Cast ==
- Paul Smith as Stewart
- Yaphet Kotto as Styles
- Heidi Helmer as Chris
- Patrick Labyorteaux as Bob
- Yvette Nipar as Tina
- Rob Stone as Tom
- Sam Temeles as Howie
- Jill Terashita as Gwen
- Kabir Bedi as Commander
- Kavi Raz as Mahaddi
- Mazhar Khan as Abdul
- Tracy Brooks Swope as Dominique
- Edward Albert as Captain Danny Jackson
- Barbara Edwards as Lady Electric
- Terence Marinan as Communications Technician
- Michael A. Saad as Hassan
- Mario Piccirillo as Eyes
- Robert Cervi as Mexican Bandit #1
- Buddy Daniels as Bald Man
- Reggie DeMorton as Military Man #1
- Joseph L. Killinger as Military Man #2
- Chuck Wells as Military Man #3
- Bryan Utman as Military Man #4

== See also ==
- Door Games
- WarGames
