= Sitting Pretty (1948 film) =

1948 film by Walter Lang

- Theatrical release poster
- Directed by: Walter Lang
- Screenplay by: F. Hugh Herbert
- Based on: Belvedere by Gwen Davenport
- Produced by: Samuel G. Engel
- Starring: Robert Young; Maureen O'Hara; Clifton Webb; Richard Haydn; Louise Allbritton
- Cinematography: Norbert Brodine
- Edited by: Harmon Jones (editorial supervision)
- Music by: Alfred Newman
- Production company: 20th Century Fox
- Distributed by: 20th Century Fox
- Release date: March 10, 1948; (New York premiere)
- Running time: 83 minutes
- Country: United States
- Language: English
- Budget: $1.3 million
- Box office: $3.55 million (U.S. and Canada rentals)

Sitting Pretty is a 1948 American comedy film directed by Walter Lang from a screenplay by F. Hugh Herbert, adapted from the novel Belvedere by Gwen Davenport. The film stars Robert Young, Maureen O'Hara, and Clifton Webb, about a family who hires the mysterious Lynn Belvedere to babysit their rowdy children.

Upon its release by 20th Century Fox in April 1948, Sitting Pretty became a box-office success. Webb received critical praise for his performance of Belvedere, which spawned two sequels.

== Plot ==
In the suburban Hummingbird Hill, lawyer Harry King and his wife Tacey have trouble retaining a nanny for their three young, rambunctious boys: Larry and Tony, both of whom get into frequent mischief with the family dog Henry; and baby Roddy. When the latest in a string of servants (all women) quits, Tacey advertises for a replacement and hires Lynn Belvedere sight unseen. However, she discovers that Lynn Belvedere is actually a man upon his arrival, a mysterious one with many skills and achievements – and who declares himself to detest children. Nonetheless, the Kings reluctantly agree to a trial period during which Belvedere quickly wins over the boys. However, his mysterious nature intrigues both of their parents, and Harry becomes annoyed by his condescending attitude.

Before Harry goes on a business trip, Tacey agrees to take Roddy and sleep over each night at the home of their friends, fellow lawyer Bill Philby and his wife Edna, just to squelch any possibility of scandal in the town over her remaining in the house with Belvedere. When one of the boys becomes sick late that night, Belvedere calls Tacey to come over for what is a stomachache. Nosy neighbor Clarence Appleton notices the lights on and investigates, soon spreading scandalous rumors linking Belvedere and Tacey romantically. The gossip reaches Harry's boss Horatio J. Hammond. When Harry returns triumphant from his trip, Hammond complains that Tacey is endangering the law firm's reputation. Though Harry does not believe the stories, he still thinks it would be best if Belvedere found other employment, but he is persuaded by his wife and children to change his mind.

Later, Tacey and Edna attend a night lecture. Afterward, they go for a snack in a fancy restaurant, where they encounter Belvedere on his day off. Belvedere invites Tacey to dance. They are spotted dancing cheek to cheek by Appleton and his equally inquisitive mother, and the malicious rumors start again. This time, Harry is not so understanding. Insulted, Tacey quarrels with him, takes their youngest, and flies to her parents' home in Fort Worth, Texas.

In the meantime, we learn that Belvedere has spent the past few weeks secretly researching and writing a salacious account of the goings-on among the residents of Hummingbird Hill. In fact, the book's blurb describes it as "a screaming satire on suburban manners and morals". The published tome becomes a national bestseller, upsetting everyone in the community. Tacey rushes home and is reconciled with her husband. Hammond fires Harry and Bill, and then announces his decision to sue Belvedere, who is pleased, as he expects the publicity to increase sales of his already popular book. He hires Harry and Bill to defend him, then reveals the source of much of his information: none other than Clarence Appleton. The informant flees, with Hammond and others in hot pursuit. Despite his new fame, Belvedere agrees to keep his job as his successful book is only the first volume of what will become a trilogy.

== Cast ==
- Robert Young as Harry King
- Maureen O'Hara as Tacey King (née Ashcroft)
- Clifton Webb as Lynn Belvedere
- Richard Haydn as Clarence Appleton
- Louise Allbritton as Edna Philby
- Randy Stuart as Peggy
- Ed Begley as Horatio J. Hammond
- Larry Olsen as Larry King
- John Russell as Bill Philby
- Betty Ann Lynn as Ginger
- Willard Robertson as Mr. Ashcroft

Uncredited

- Anthony Sydes as Tony King
- Roddy McCaskill as Roddy King
- Charles Arnt as Mr. Taylor
- Ken Christy as Mr. McPherson
- Mary Field as Della
- Grayce Hampton as Mrs. Appleton
- Marion Marshall as secretary
- Mira McKinney as Mrs. Phillips
- Dave Morris as mailman
- Jane Nigh as Mabel Phillips
- Isabel Randolph as Mrs. Frisbee
- Syd Saylor as cab driver
- Ann Shoemaker as Mrs. Ashcroft
- Charles Tannen as newsreel director
- Minerva Urecal as Mrs. Maypole
- Josephine Whittell as Mrs. Hammond
- Cara Williams as secretary

== Production ==
The film was originally titled Belvedere just as the novel, but was changed to Sitting Pretty. John Payne was meant to play the role of the husband. Celeste Holm was also cast in the film, but exited to film The Snake Pit. Filming took place from October 23 to December 16, 1947.

Studio head Darryl F. Zanuck was immensely excited about the film in its production, while Webb – who had mostly been cast by Fox as sophisticated, superior upper-class characters – was cast in a departure from his previous genres. Webb also danced in the film, one of the rare chances he was able to showcase the dancing, singing, and comedic talents which made him popular on Broadway prior to his signing with Fox in 1944. Webb later recalled the film as "the most pleasant engagement I have ever had, either in the theatre or on the screen."

Photographer Loomis Dean visited the set to photograph the filming for Life and photographed Webb together with then-unknown actresses Laurette Luez and Marilyn Monroe, who do not appear in the film.

== Reception ==
Bosley Crowther wrote in The New York Times that while "light in substance, but solid in humor, this [movie's] material is handled dexterously by all who come anywhere near it – and especially, as we say, by Mr. Webb". He also found Maureen O'Hara and Robert Young "delightfully clever".

=== Awards ===
- Clifton Webb was nominated for the Academy Award for Best Actor at the 1948 Academy Awards.
- F. Hugh Herbert won the Writers Guild of America, Best Written American Comedy in 1949.
- The film won a gold medal at the Photoplay Awards 1948.

== Sequels and adaptions ==
While the film was successful, the particular success of Webb as Belvedere inspired Fox to produce a series of films centered around the Belvedere character. Although Fox commissioned six scripts, only Mr. Belvedere Goes to College (1949) and Mr. Belvedere Rings the Bell (1951) were made; the studio cancelled the series when the latter film was not a success.

A radio and television adaption of the film were produced. The radio adaptation was presented by Lux Radio Theater on February 14, 1949. In 1956, the film was remade for The 20th Century Fox Hour under the title Mr. Belvedere. The television adaption starred Reginald Gardiner in the title role. The production also served as a backdoor pilot for a series starring Gardiner which never developed.
