= Tracy Wells =

American actress (born 1971)

- Born: Tracy Anne Brockstein; March 13, 1971 (age 55); Encino, California
- Occupation: actress
- Years active: 1984–1994
- Known for: playing Heather Owens on Mr. Belvedere (1985–1990)

Tracy Wells (born Tracy Anne Brockstein; March 13, 1971 in Encino, California) is an American actress.

== Career ==
Wells is best known for playing Heather Owens on the ABC sitcom Mr. Belvedere (1985–1990). She won the Young Artist Award in the "Best Young Actress Starring in a New Television Series" category for her work on that show. She was also a guest star on the show Growing Pains. Before Mr. Belvedere, her first primetime TV appearance was on an episode of Silver Spoons as Corliss in the episode "Beauties and the Beasts". She also starred in the movie The Search, Showtime's Dragstrip Girl, and Mirror, Mirror 2:Raven Dance.

== Personal life ==
She was married to her husband, Erin Cook, until his death in 2001. They have two children, Sarah and McKellan. Tracy is currently married to Frank Bernardo.

She currently is known as Tracy Tofte and is a realtor at Keller Williams Advisors in Brentwood.
