= The Silver Whistle (play) =

The Silver Whistle is a play by Robert E. McEnroe. It ran for 219 performances on Broadway from November 24, 1948 to May 28, 1949, with Jose Ferrer in the lead. The play was selected as one of the best plays of 1948-1949, with an excerpted version published in "The Burns Mantle Best Plays of 1948-1949."

== Plot ==
Wilfred Tasbinder impersonates 77 year old Oliver Erwenter to get in an old-folks home. While there he shows the inmates that they are only as old as they feel. He helps a reverend have a romance.

== Background ==
It was the twelfth three-act play written by McEnroe, who worked at a factory as a day job. The previous eleven plays had not been commercially produced, although there had been some interest in the eleventh. McEnroe had been told there was no audience for plays about old people and was determined to prove them wrong. He says he was also inspired by the various vagabonds he met at a bar in Hartford, Connecticut. At one stage the play was known as Oliver Erwenter.

The play was picked up by the Theatre Guild who previewed it in Westport Connecticut. This was a success so they took the play to Broadway. Jose Ferrer starred in production which Brooks Atkinson from the New York Times called "delightful".

Lloyd Nolan performed in the play in Los Angeles. John Carradine also starred in it.

== Adaptations ==
The play was adapted several times

- as a feature film, Mr. Belvedere Rings the Bell (1951).
- for radio on Theatre Guild on the Air with James Stewart in 1952
- for an episode of Playhouse 90 for TV in 1959.
- for an episode of ITV Play of the Week in 1960

Film rights were originally bought by Charles Feldman in June 1949 for a reported $50,000. In October 1950 he sold them to 20th Century Fox who turned it into a vehicle for Clifton Webb. Henry Koster was assigned to direct and Ranald MacDougall wrote a script. The film became Mr. Belvedere Rings the Bell.
