= Crash Course (film) =

1988 television film by Oz Scott

- VHS cover
- Also known as: Driving Academy
- Genre: Comedy
- Written by: William A. Schwartz
- Directed by: Oz Scott
- Starring: Jackeé; Charlie Robinson; Edie McClurg; Tina Yothers; Alyssa Milano; Harvey Korman; Dick Butkus; Ray Walston
- Music by: Mark Davis
- Country of origin: United States
- Original language: English

Production
- Executive producer: Charles Fries
- Producers: Irv Wilson; Maj Canton; Yuri Spilny
- Production location: Los Angeles
- Cinematography: Bernd Heinl
- Editor: Duane Hartzell
- Running time: 95 minutes
- Production company: Fries Distribution Company

Original release
- Network: NBC
- Release: January 17, 1988

Crash Course (also known as Driving Academy) is a 1988 American made for television teen comedy film directed by Oz Scott.

== Plot ==
Crash Course centers on a group of high schoolers in a driver's education class; many for the second or third time. The recently divorced teacher, super-passive Larry Pearl (Charlie Robinson), is on thin ice with the football fanatic principal, Principal Paulson (Ray Walston), who is being pressured by the district superintendent to raise driver's education completion rates or lose his coveted football program. With this in mind, Principal Paulson and his assistant, with a secret desire for his job, Abner Frasier (Harvey Korman), hire an outside driver's education instructor with a very tough reputation, Edna Savage (Jackée Harry), a.k.a. E.W. Savage, who quickly takes control of the class.

The plot focuses mostly on the students and their interactions with their teachers and each other. In the beginning, Rico (Brian Bloom) is the loner with just a few friends, Chadley (Rob Stone) is the bookish nerd with few friends who longs to be cool and also longs to be a part of Vanessa's (Alyssa Milano) life who is the young, friendly and attractive girl who had to fake her over-protective mother's signature on her driver's education permission slip. Kichi (B.D. Wong) is the hip-hop Asian kid who often raps what he has to say and constantly flirts with Maria (Olivia d'Abo), the rich foreign girl who thinks that the right-of-way on the roadways always goes to (insert awesomely fake foreign Latino accent) “my father’s limo”. Finally you have stereotypical football meathead J.J. (Nathan Dyer), who needs to pass his English exam to keep his eligibility and constantly asks out and gets rejected by Alice (Tina Yothers), the tomboy whose father owns “Santini & Son” Concrete Company. Alice is portrayed as being the “son” her father wanted.

As the movie progresses, the students’ relationships with their teacher, each other and their driving abilities all begin to improve. Friendships are formed in and out of the classroom. All the while Abner, Acting Principal while Paulson is out of town, is spying on the entire bunch, teachers and students, and constantly calling the superintendent with the purpose of smearing the reputation of Principal Paulson in hopes of taking his job. In the meantime, Edna, who was initially cool and somewhat hostile to Larry, begins to see him in a new light. At the same time, Larry, who was initially a nervous and passive man due mainly to stress involving his ex-wife and their divorce proceedings, becomes more assertive and confident in himself, which Edna finds very attractive.

Just as things start to look up for the class in school and at home, an untimely accident involving Chad, Vanessa and the driver's education car brings the entire class closer together. Literally, each character, save for Abner whose attempts to take over as principal are thwarted by the progression of all the characters and the timely return of Principal Paulson, reaches a point in their life where they seem happy with themselves, their relationships with their friends and their relationships with their parents. Ultimately, all the kids pass the course with flying colors, and Larry and Edna end up falling in love and entering into a romantic relationship.

== Cast ==
Teens

- Brian Bloom as Rico Conner, a teenager with a tough father who owns a tow truck company. His parents fight a lot because his mother believes his father is too rough on him. Because of his bad relationships, he is a loner at school for the most part, but is friends with Kichi and forms a close friendship with Chad later on. He initially blackmails Vanessa into going on a date with him when he overhears her and Alice talking about how Vanessa forged her mother's signature on her driver's education permission slip, but their relationship improves later in the movie.
- Alyssa Milano as Vanessa Crawford, a friendly, well-adjusted teenager who is annoyed by her overprotecting mother. She just wants to do stuff that every teenager does, but gets stopped by her mother, who constantly wants to be her friend by dressing exactly like her. Vanessa wants to sign up for driver's education, but her mother thinks it is too dangerous, so she forges her signature on the permission form for the course. She is the new kid at school and is nice to everyone.
- Rob Stone as Chadley Bennett IV, a straight-A student who comes from a wealthy upper-class family. He doesn't have a great relationship with his father, who wants him to be popular. He knows the answer to every question relating to the driver's education course, but can't drive a car. Kichi helps Chad shed his nerdy image halfway through the movie. After a somewhat harrowing experience during a road test, he and Rico become close friends.
- Olivia d'Abo as Maria Abeja, a wealthy, attractive and conceited South American exchange student who only cares about her looks. Her father is a political dictator who assigns a bodyguard to look after her and drive her wherever she needs to go. Kichi is infatuated with Maria and constantly attempts to win her over romantically. She initially rebuffs all his attempts to do so until the very end of the movie when she finally begins to warm up to him. Initially, she showed some interest in J.J. (mainly because Alice was tutoring him in English Literature), but it proves to be short lived.
- Tina Yothers as Alice Santini, a shy girl who looks like a tomboy. She focuses on her future career and turns down J.J. a lot, although she likes him. Her father wants her to work in the family business with him as a cement truck driver. There was some minor friction between her and Maria when she showed some interest in J.J., but this blew over quickly.
- Nathan Dyer as J.J. Maslanski, a stereotypical football player who eats a lot and has an eye for Alice. He flunks every test he takes. He becomes the object of persecution at the hands of Abner Fraser, who is pressuring him to pass his English Literature class, which he eventually does with the help of Alice.
- B.D. Wong as Kichi, a Japanese teenager from Nagasaki who loves to flirt with girls. He is a talented rapper and dancer and is regarded as the comedian of the group. He is good friends with Rico and J.J., and also forms a friendship with Chad, helping him shed his nerdy image halfway through the movie. Kichi becomes smitten with Maria and constantly attempts to win her heart. He finally succeeds in getting her attention, but not until late in the movie.

Other

- Jackée Harry as Edna Savage, a tough driving instructor who is brought in by the school to improve the test scores of the class. She initially clashes with Larry over his teaching skills, but eventually falls for him romantically.
- Charlie Robinson as Larry Pearle, is an unsuccessful driving instructor who is on the brink of being fired if the test scores of the driver's education class do not improve. His class discussions usually end with him telling the class how bad off he is since his wife left him. As the movie goes on, however, his combative relationship with Edna leads him to become more assertive and confident in himself, which causes Edna to see him in a new light.
- Harvey Korman as Abner Fraser, an English teacher who wants to become the principal of the school. He sucks up to Principal Paulson to gain favor, but secretly plots behind his back to replace him. He also bullies J.J. into taking his English Literature class over again, hoping to flunk him to keep him from graduating and to ruin the school's sports programs.
- Ray Walston as Principal Paulson. He threatens to fire Larry (despite liking him as a person) if he doesn't bring up the school's drivers education test scores in six weeks and introduces Edna to help. He's always worried about his popularity.
- Edie McClurg as Beth Crawford, Vanessa's mother. She prefers to see herself as Vanessa's best friend as opposed to her mother. She usually wears a matching outfit to whatever Vanessa wears each day. However, when Vanessa finally calls her mother out on this behavior and tells her how much it bothers her, she stops and their relationship begins to improve for the better.
- Dick Butkus as Ed Conner, Rico's father. He has something of a combative relationship with his wife, Maxine, and wants his son to succeed in (business) life. He owns a tow truck company called Smilin' Ed's and has something of a reputation in town due to him appearing in the commercial advertising his business in a chicken suit.
- Julie Payne as Maxine Konner, Rico's mother.
- Allen Williams as Chadley Bennett III, Chadley's father.
