= Rob Stone (actor) =

American actor and director

- Occupation: Actor/Director
- Years active: 1983–present
- Spouse: Melissa Chan (1998–present)

Rob Stone is an American director and former actor, best known for playing teen Kevin Owens on the 1985–1990 sitcom Mr. Belvedere. He later became a writer and director of documentary films, and also performed as part of a band.

== Biography ==
Stone was born on September 22, 1962 in Dallas, Texas. He is the son of Dr. Marvin and Jill Stone. His father was chief of oncology at the Sammons Cancer Center at Baylor University Medical Center. Stone began acting at the age of 13, first appearing onstage in a production of "Santa Fe Sunshine" at the Dallas Theater Center. In 1982, he left Dallas and moved to Los Angeles, California to pursue an acting degree at the University of Southern California's drama school. In addition to his role on Mr. Belvedere, Stone also appeared in an episode of the American television shows The Facts of Life, Silver Spoons, 21 Jump Street and Matlock.

Andrew Greeley, writing in The New York Times, called Stone's acting in one episode of Mr. Belvedere "very sensitive". Discussing that episode, he wrote "The subtle interplay between the two young people (played by Rob Stone and Debbie Barker) provided some of the most touching and skillful scenes I've ever seen on television."

In 1986, Stone established Vienna Productions to make documentary films. The company's first project was a short film on homelessness called The Sidewalk Motel, made in 1990. The film starred Christopher Hewett and Caroline Lagerfelt. Hewett and Stone had previously worked together on Mr. Belvedere, in which Hewett played the title role. Bruce Springsteen performed Woody Guthrie's song "I Ain't Got No Home" for this film. It "was shot under a Screen Actors Guild experimental letter agreement that is designed to help new directors with non-commercial projects."

Also produced by the company was the two-hour Blue Angels documentary Blue Angels: Around the World At the Speed of Sound, hosted by Dennis Quaid. The film was shown on the Arts & Entertainment Network, and won a CableACE Award in 1995.

Other documentaries directed by Stone or produced by his production company include Thunder Over the Pacific, hosted by Candice Bergen, and Into the Wild Blue, hosted by Tom Skerritt, both shown on The History Channel; The 30th Anniversary of Title IX, featuring Billie Jean King; and Sir William Osler: Science and the Art of Medicine, narrated by Richard Dreyfuss. In 1998, Stone directed One Vision, a documentary about film directing, which included interviews with Martin Scorsese, Oliver Stone, Quentin Tarantino, Robert Zemeckis, Sydney Pollack, Rob Reiner, Penny Marshall, and Ron Howard.

== Filmography (as actor) ==
| Year | Title | Role | Notes |
|---|---|---|---|
| 1983 | Malcolm | Malcolm | Unsold TV pilot |
| 1984 | The Facts of Life | Harvey | Episode: "Crossing the Line" |
| 1984 | V | Movie Usher | Episode: "The Sanction" |
| 1985–90 | Mr. Belvedere | Kevin Owens | 117 episodes |
| 1985 | CBS Schoolbreak Special | Horace "Ace" Hobart | Episode: "Ace Hits the Big Time" |
| 1986 | ABC Afterschool Special | Jed | Episode: "A Desperate Exit" |
| 1986 | Silver Spoons | Frankie | Episode: "Rick Moves Out" |
| 1987 | Rags to Riches | Arnold | Episode: "That's Cheating" |
| 1987 | 21 Jump Street | T.J. Caldwell | Episode: "Two for the Road" |
| 1987 | Terminal Entry | Tom | Feature film |
| 1988 | Crash Course | Chadley Bennett IV | TV movie |
| 1988 | ABC Afterschool Special | Chris | Episode: "A Family Again" |
| 1989 | The Super Mario Brothers Super Show | Rob Stone | Episode: "Heart Throb" |
| 1991 | Revenge of the Nerds | Lewis Skolnick | Unaired TV pilot |
| 1993 | Matlock | Clyde Eller | Episodes: "The Fatal Seduction" (Parts 1 & 2) |
| 2004 | I Am Stamos | Party Guest | Short film |
