= Mr. Belvedere Rings the Bell =

1951 film by Henry Koster

- Directed by: Henry Koster
- Screenplay by: Ranald MacDougall
- Based on: The Silver Whistle; 1948 play by Robert E. McEnroe
- Produced by: Andre Hakim
- Starring: Clifton Webb; Joanne Dru; Hugh Marlowe; Zero Mostel
- Cinematography: Joseph LaShelle
- Edited by: William B. Murphy
- Music by: Cyril Mockridge
- Production company: Twentieth Century-Fox
- Distributed by: Twentieth Century-Fox
- Release dates: August 1, 1951 (New York); August 10, 1951 (Los Angeles)
- Running time: 87 minutes
- Country: United States
- Language: English
- Box office: $1.75 million (U.S. rentals)

Mr. Belvedere Rings the Bell is a 1951 American comedy film, the third and final starring Clifton Webb as Lynn Belvedere. It follows Sitting Pretty (1948) and Mr. Belvedere Goes to College (1949). The screenplay written by Ranald MacDougall is based on the play The Silver Whistle by Robert E. McEnroe.

== Plot ==
Mr. Belvedere embarks on a lecture tour delivering speeches about how to feel young even at the age of 80. After overhearing residents of a church-operated retirement home discussing their ailments, he wonders whether there is any point in living to 80 himself and launches an investigation at the home. When he visits Bishop Daniels about gaining entry, he is mistaken for Oliver Erwenter, who had applied for admission but died at age 77. Belvedere does not correct the mistake as only the aged are admitted.

After encountering initial skepticism, Belvedere uses the placebo effect to cause the home's residents to feel younger, dispensing what he calls youth pills from Tibet, which are actually just sugar pills. The staid Rev. Charles Watson, who operates the home, disapproves. Belvedere also helps Harriet Tripp, Watson's assistant, with her romance problem, as she is in love with Watson. With the help of Emmett, the lecture-tour company's advance man, Belvedere prepares for a church bazaar to raise funds for the home.

Watson discovers Belvedere's true identity but keeps the information to himself after seeing how much good Belvedere has accomplished. Reporters finally uncover Belvedere's deception and the disillusioned residents of the home revert to their cheerless routine, but Belvedere convinces them that they are only as old as they feel. Watson sees the light and proposes marriage to Miss Tripp.

His work done, and convinced that it is worthwhile to live to 80, Belvedere leaves to resume his lecture tour.

== Cast ==
- Clifton Webb as Lynn Belvedere
- Joanne Dru as Miss Tripp
- Hugh Marlowe as Rev. Charles Watson
- Zero Mostel as Emmett
- Billy Lynn as Mr. Beebe
- Doro Merande as Mrs. Hammer
- Frances Brandt as Miss Hoadley
- Kathleen Comegys as Mrs. Sampler
- Jane Marbury as Mrs. Gross
- Harry Hines as Mr. Cherry
- Warren Stevens as Reporter

Uncredited

- Hugh Beaumont as Policeman
- Kathryn Sheldon as Bishop's Housekeeper
- Harry Antrim as Bishop Daniels
- J. Farrell MacDonald as Mr. Kroeger
- Norman Leavitt as Pharmacist
- Edward Clark as Mailman
- Guy Wilkerson as Kramer
- Ray Montgomery as Reporter
- Thomas Browne Henry as Father Shea
- Ferris Taylor as Curtis

== Production ==
The film's screenplay, written by Ranald MacDougall, is based based on the play The Silver Whistle by American playwright Robert E. McEnroe. Although the plot of the film resembles that of the play, Mr. Belvedere is not a character in the play. The play's leading character is a hobo named Oliver Erwenter, played by José Ferrer. The Silver Whistle, with all of its original characters, was broadcast in a 1959 episode of the television anthology series Playhouse 90, with Eddie Albert in the role of Erwenter.

== Reception ==
In a contemporary review for The New York Times, critic Bosley Crowther called the film "a poorly conceived alteration of 'The Silver Whistle'" and wrote:

There is something disturbingly fishy about "Mr. Belvedere Rings the Bell" ... And, if this corner's nose is not mistaken, the fishy thing about it is the cloaking of the testy Lynn Belvedere in a Pollyanna role. Of course, you remember Mr. Belvedere. He is the fabulous gent who made his first bow in ''Sitting Pretty" under the personal guidance and auspices of Clifton Webb. In that initial encounter, Mr. Belvedere established himself—or perhaps we should say he was established—as the world's No. 1 egoist. Literate, brilliant and worldly, he had done everything, been everywhere and pursued every intellectual highway in the tireless cultivation of self. ... Well, what do you think has now happened? Mr. Belvedere's spleen has been recharged with the milk of human kindness and he has been turned out to do good in the world! ... [I]t is hard to swallow Mr. Belvedere in such an unlikely place, and we find his airy patronage of the oldsters in decidedly questionable taste.

Critic Edwin Schallert of the Los Angeles Times wrote:

Salty comments of the principal character will probably be the main facet of appeal In "Mr. Belvedere Rings the Bell," which in accomplishment falls between a good Clifton Webb picture and its original, 'The Silver Whistle." Take it most of the way and it is rather inept as a Belvedere adventure, while peculiarly enough it presents a rather good theme. The production rather suggests that Belvedere stories should stand on their own. He can't be mixed with any other character. ... Webb gives a performance that is typical and should please the devotees of Mr. Belvedere, even though they may feel a certain forced quality in the picture. He carries off his role as always with great aplomb.
