= Samuel M. Hay =

19th century American businessman and politician

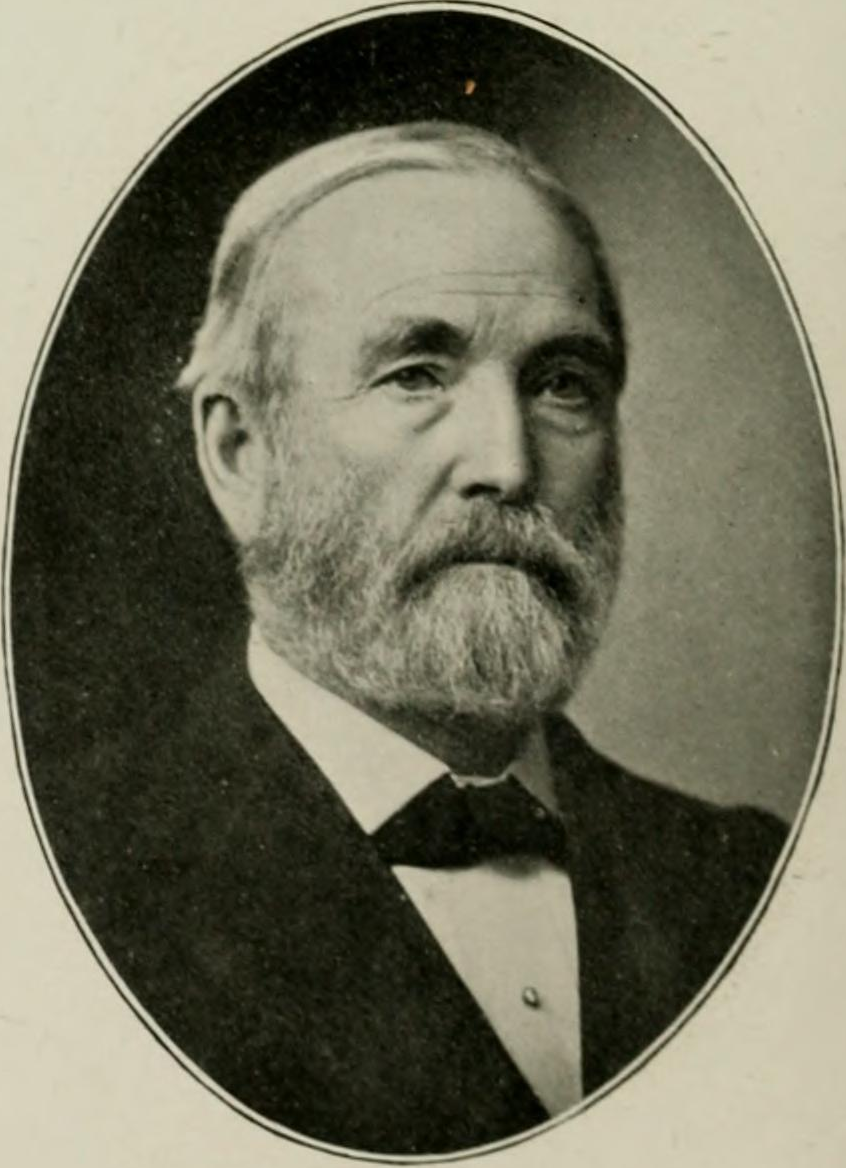
- Portrait from Notable Men of Wisconsin (1902)

Member of the Wisconsin Senate from the 21st district
- In office January 6, 1862 – January 5, 1863
- Preceded by: Horace O. Crane
- Succeeded by: Joseph B. Hamilton

Member of the Wisconsin State Assembly from the Winnebago 1st district
- In office January 4, 1858 – January 3, 1859
- Preceded by: Philetus Sawyer
- Succeeded by: Richard P. Eighme

5th Mayor of Oshkosh, Wisconsin
- In office April 1858 – April 1860
- Preceded by: Joseph Jackson
- Succeeded by: B. S. Henning

Personal details
- Born: August 7, 1825 Fairview Township, Erie County, Pennsylvania, U.S.
- Died: October 26, 1906 (aged 81) Oshkosh, Wisconsin, U.S.
- Cause of death: Pneumonia
- Resting place: Riverside Cemetery, Oshkosh
- Party: Republican
- Spouse: Maria E. Spaulding (m. 1852; died 1875)
- Children: Samuel Thayer Hay^{(b. 1854; died 1906)}; George F. Hay^{(b. 1857; died 1862)}; Mary (Caldwell)^{(b. 1864; died 1957)}; William J. Hay^{(b. 1865; died 1931)}
- Relatives: Frank Merrill Caldwell (son-in-law); Mary Hay (granddaughter)
- Occupation: Banker, businessman

Samuel McClellan Hay (August 7, 1825 – October 26, 1906) was an American businessman, banker, Republican politician, and Wisconsin pioneer, prominent in the establishment and development of Oshkosh, Wisconsin. He was the fifth mayor of Oshkosh, and served one year each in the Wisconsin Senate (1862) and State Assembly (1858) representing Winnebago County. His name was often abbreviated as S. M. Hay.

== Early life ==
Samuel M. Hay was born in Fairview Township, Erie County, Pennsylvania, in August 1825. As a child, he worked on his father's farm in the summers and studied at the town schools in the winters. At age 15, his father paid for him to attend Allegheny College, but Hay declined and instead chose to pursue an apprenticeship in tin, copper, and iron working. After four years, he was a master tinsmith.

== Business career ==
He came west to the Wisconsin Territory in 1845, arriving at Milwaukee by boat, and then moving to Whitewater. There he affiliated with S. C. Hall, a merchant who had previously moved to the territory from Erie County, Pennsylvania. Hay worked as a tradesman in Hall's factory and lived in Hall's home for three years. Hall's brother, Eli Collins Hall, was a friend to Hay at the time, and Hay taught him the tinsmith trade.

Hay traveled extensively around the Wisconsin Territory on trading missions during his time employed by Hall. He first visited the area that would become Oshkosh, Wisconsin, in 1846, when he accompanied a friend on a trip to the trading post which then existed at that location. During that trip, he was so impressed by the natural features of the area, he decided to eventually settle there permanently.

In the Fall of 1848, he felt he had sufficient resources to start off on his own and came to the site of Oshkosh, which at the time had about 100 inhabitants, mostly of French and Indian heritage. Hall brought with him his friend and partner, Eli C. Hall, and together they established a tinware business in the settlement. Hall retired from the business in 1851, and Hay partnered with another former employee, Orson J. Clark, and the firm was known as Hay & Clark for the next decade. Hay bought out Clark's share of the partnership when Clark's health began to fail in 1862, and Hay then partnered with his younger brother, William Henry Hay, renaming the firm "S. M. Hay and Brother". The firm was then reorganized in 1892 as the Hay Hardware Company, with Samuel Hay as president and William as treasurer. Despite suffering two major fires—in 1859 and 1875—the business grew steadily and prospered. By 1880, it was the only business left from those early years of Oshkosh.

While his business was growing and flourishing, Hay also became involved in banking, and in 1863 he was one of the founders of the First National Bank of Oshkosh, which was reorganized in 1884 as the National Bank of Oshkosh. By that time, Hay had mostly given up management of his hardware business to his brother, and instead focused his energy on banking and investing. Hay served as a president of the bank for 40 years, surviving the several financial panics of the late 19th century which destroyed many other banks, and (according to his obituary) never missed a day of work. In addition, Hay was a director of the Manufacturers National Bank of Neenah, and a major shareholder of the Commercial Bank of Appleton and the Kellogg National Bank of Green Bay. He also held a smaller interest in the Fond du Lac National Bank, the Wisconsin National Bank of Milwaukee, and the Royal Trust Company of Chicago.

Through his business interests, he was also involved in many professional organizations. He was a vice president of the American Bankers Association and president of the Wisconsin Bankers Association, the Oshkosh Stock Growers Association, and the Oshkosh Business Men's Association. Throughout most of his time in banking, Hay was a close associate of Philetus Sawyer, who served as mayor, congressman, and United States senator. Sawyer served as an officer for several years in Hay's bank, and Sawyer's son, Edgar, succeeded Hay as president of the bank after his retirement in 1903.

== Political career ==
Early in his business career, Hay became active in politics with the newly established Republican Party. He was elected to the Oshkosh city council in 1856, and was then elected to the Wisconsin State Assembly in the Fall of 1857, running on the Republican Party ticket. He defeated Democrat William A. Knapp in the general election and went on to serve in the 1858 legislative session. At the time, his district comprised all of the city of Oshkosh and a few surrounding towns in the central part of Winnebago County.

During his term in the Assembly, in April 1858, he was elected to his first term as mayor of Oshkosh. He was re-elected in 1859, serving through April 1860.

In the midst of the first year of the American Civil War, Winnebago County's incumbent state senator Horace O. Crane, resigned from office to become a surgeon in the Union Army. Samuel Hay was the Republican nominee for the special election to fill the remaining year of Crane's term. He defeated Democratic candidate Charles Morgan in the general election and served in the Senate for the 1862 session. He did not run for re-election in 1862.

In 1876, he was appointed to the board of regents of the State Normal Schools by Governor Harrison Ludington, serving until February 1879. In 1892, he was appointed by president Benjamin Harrison to a commission to inspect the U.S. mint in Philadelphia.

== Personal life and family ==
Samuel Hay was the eldest son among 11 children born to James John Hay and his wife Nancy (née Laughlin). His father was a successful farmer. Hay's great-grandfather, John Hay, was the first of his line to arrive in America, coming in the mid-1700s, with his brothers, and serving in the continental militia during the American Revolutionary War. John Hay was a descendant of Clan Hay—his grandfather was the Jacobite Scottish noble John Hay of Cromlix.

Samuel Hay married Maria (Mary) E. Spaulding of New York in 1852. They had at least four children, though one son died in childhood. Mary died in 1875 on the same day as a major fire in Oshkosh, but it's unclear if that was the direct cause of her death.

Hay largely retired from business in 1903. He enjoyed good health almost until the last year of his life. He suffered from a brief illness in May 1905, from which he never fully recovered. He developed symptoms of Pneumonia on October 23, 1906, slipped into unconsciousness on the morning of October 25, and expired at his home the morning of October 26, 1906.

He was survived by only two of his children, his eldest son, Samuel Thayer Hay died of disease eight months before his father. His only surviving son, his youngest, William J. Hay, had a long and prosperous business career in Oshkosh.

His only known daughter, Mary, married Frank Merrill Caldwell, a career U.S. Army officer who served as a brigadier general in World War I. Through this marriage, Samuel Hay was a grandfather of the dancer and silent film actress Mary Hay.

Hay, his wife, and all of their children, as well as General Caldwell, are interred at the family's massive mausoleum in Oshkosh's historic Riverside Cemetery.

Hay's former home was designed by the prolific Wisconsin architect William Waters. It stood on Algoma Blvd near the intersection with Jackson Street. A record of the home exists in the Wisconsin Historical Society, but the house no longer stands.

== See also ==
- List of mayors of Oshkosh, Wisconsin

Wisconsin State Assembly
Preceded by Philetus Sawyer	Member of the Wisconsin State Assembly from the Winnebago 1st district January 4, 1858 – January 3, 1859	Succeeded by Richard P. Eighme
Wisconsin Senate
Preceded by Horace O. Crane	Member of the Wisconsin Senate from the 21st district January 6, 1862 – January 5, 1863	Succeeded by Joseph B. Hamilton
Political offices
Preceded by Joseph Jackson	Mayor of Oshkosh, Wisconsin; April 1858 – April 1860	Succeeded by B. S. Henning
