= Clifton Webb =

American actor, singer, dancer (1889–1966)

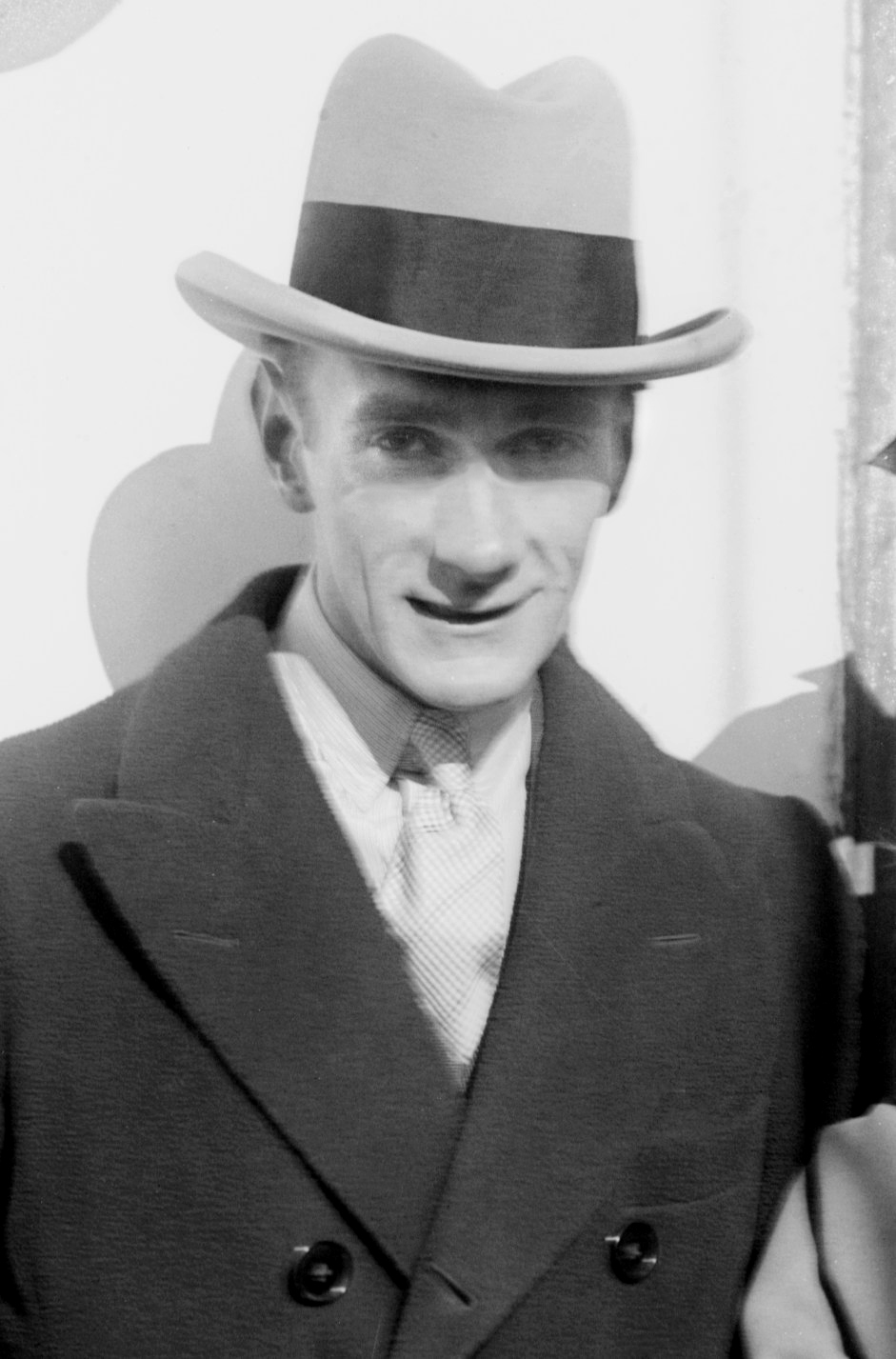
- Webb in 1923
- Born: Webb Parmelee Hollenbeck; November 19, 1889; Indianapolis, Indiana, U.S.
- Died: October 13, 1966 (aged 76); Beverly Hills, California, U.S.
- Resting place: Hollywood Forever Cemetery
- Occupations: Actor; singer; dancer
- Years active: 1913–1962

Clifton Webb (born Webb Parmelee Hollenbeck; November 19, 1889 – October 13, 1966) was an American actor, singer, and dancer. Originally trained as a ballroom dancer, he first achieved prominence on Broadway as a star of musicals and revues, and his appearances in the plays of Noël Coward, including Blithe Spirit. He had his film breakthrough at the age of 55 in Otto Preminger's Laura (1944), which earned him an Academy Award nomination for Best Supporting Actor.

Webb subsequently received two more Oscar nominations, Best Supporting Actor for The Razor's Edge (1946) and Best Actor for Sitting Pretty (1948). He also won a Golden Globe for the former, with a second nomination for Stars and Stripes Forever (1952).

== Early life ==
Webb was born Webb Parmelee Hollenbeck in Indianapolis, Indiana, the only child of Jacob Grant Hollenbeck (1867 – May 2, 1939), the ticket-clerk son of a grocer from an Indiana farming family, and his wife, Mabel A. (née Parmelee, March 24, 1869 – October 17, 1960), the daughter of David Parmelee, a railroad conductor, and his wife, Grace (née Saville). Webb's parents married in Kankakee, Illinois on January 18, 1888, and separated in 1891, shortly after their son's birth. According to Marion County, Indiana, records, the marriage took place in Indianapolis.

In 1892, Webb's mother, now styling herself "Mabelle", moved to New York City with her beloved "little Webb", as she called him for the remainder of her life. She dismissed questions about her husband, Jacob, who like her father, worked for the Indianapolis-St. Louis Railroad, by saying, "We never speak of him. He didn't care for the theatre." The couple apparently divorced, since, by 1900, Mabelle was married to Green B. Raum Jr. New York City's 1900 U.S. census indicates Mabelle and her son were using the surname Raum and living on West 77th Street with Green Berry Raum Jr., a copper-foundry worker, who gave his position in the household as Mabel's husband. Green B. Raum Jr. was the son of General Green Berry Raum, former U.S. Commissioner of Internal Revenue and former U.S. Commissioner of Pensions. Webb's father, Jacob, married his second wife, Ethel Brown, and he died in 1939.

== Career ==
=== Broadway ===
In 1909, using his new stage name, 19-year-old Clifton Webb became a professional ballroom dancer, often partnering with "exceedingly decorative" star dancer Bonnie Glass (she eventually replaced him with Rudolph Valentino); they performed in about two dozen operettas. His debut on Broadway began when The Purple Road opened at the Liberty Theatre on April 7, 1913; he played the role of Bosco for the 136 performances before closing in August. His mother (billed as Mabel Parmalee) was listed in the program as a member of the opening-night cast. His next musical was an Al Jolson vehicle, Sigmund Romberg's Dancing Around, which opened at the Winter Garden Theatre on October 10, 1914, ran for 145 performances, and closed in the following February. Later in 1915, Webb was cast in the all-star revue Ned Wayburn's Town Topics, which boasted 117 famous performers, including Will Rogers, as listed in the Century Theatre opening-night program for September 23, 1915. It closed 68 performances later on November 20, 1915. In 1916, he had another short run with Cole Porter's comic opera See America First, which opened at the Maxine Elliott Theatre on March 28, 1916, and closed after 15 performances on April 8, 1916.

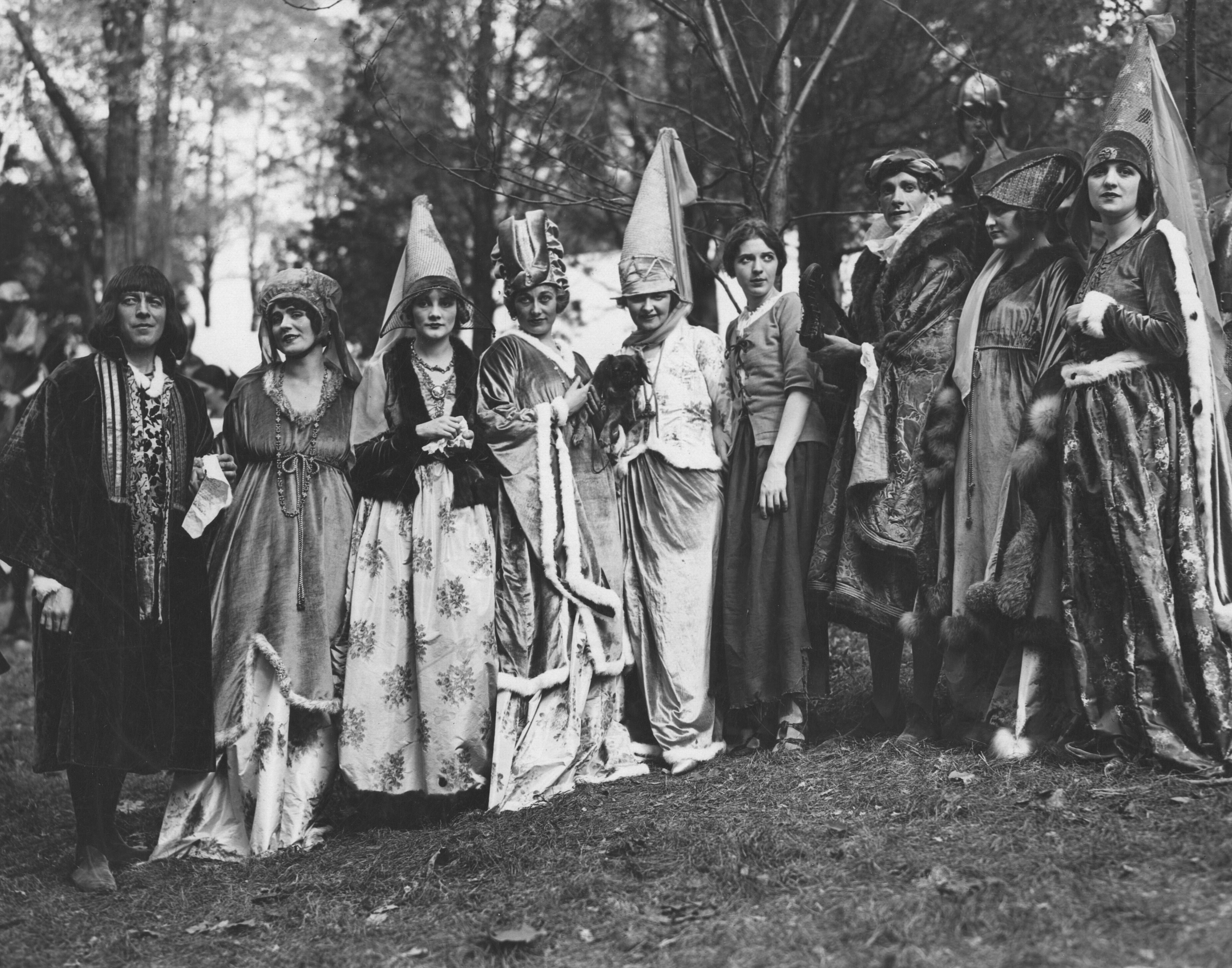
Webb (third from right) in a 1917 theatre production of National Red Cross Pageant with Eugene O'Brien, Ivy Troutman, Jeanne Eagels, and others

The year 1917 proved to be better, with a 233-performance run of Jerome Kern's Love O' Mike, opening on January 15 at the Shubert Theatre. After moving to Maxine Elliott's Theatre, and then the Casino Theatre, it closed on September 29, 1917. Webb also appeared that year with other Broadway stars in the National Red Cross Pageant a 50-minute film of a stage production held to benefit the American Red Cross. Webb's final show of the 1910s, the musical Listen Lester, had the longest run, 272 performances. It opened at the Knickerbocker Theatre on December 23, 1918, and closed in August 1919.

In the 1920s, Webb played in eight Broadway shows and made numerous other stage appearances, including vaudeville, and a handful of silent films. The revue As You Were, with additional songs by Cole Porter, opened at the Central Theatre on January 29, 1920, running 143 performances until May 29, 1920. Webb was busy with films, tours, and an appearance at the London Pavilion in 1921 as Mr. St. Louis in Fun of the Fayre and in 1922 in Phi-Phi – he did not return to Broadway until 1923. He then played in the musical Jack and Jill at the Globe Theatre for 92 performances between March 22 and June 9 of 1923, followed by Lynn Starling's comic play Meet the Wife, which opened on November 26, 1923, and ran through the summer of 1924. One of the play's leads was 24-year-old Humphrey Bogart. In 1925, Webb appeared on stage in a dance act with vaudeville star and silent film actress Mary Hay. Later that year, when her husband, Richard Barthelmess and she decided to produce and star the film New Toys, they chose Webb to be second lead. The film proved to be financially successful, but 19 more years would pass before Webb appeared in another feature film.

Webb's mainstay was clearly Broadway theatre. Between 1913 and 1947, the tall, slender performer with the clear, gentle tenor appeared in 23 Broadway shows, starting with major supporting roles and quickly progressing to leads. He introduced George and Ira Gershwin's "I've Got a Crush on You" in Treasure Girl in 1928; Arthur Schwartz and Howard Dietz's "I Guess I'll Have to Change My Plan" in The Little Show in 1929; "Louisiana Hayride" in Flying Colors in 1932; and Irving Berlin's “Easter Parade" in the very successful revue As Thousands Cheer. His steamy duet with Libby Holman of “Moanin' Low” stunned the crowd nightly. in 1933. One of his stage sketches, performed with co-star Fred Allen, was filmed by Vitaphone as a short subject entitled The Still Alarm in 1930. Allen's experiences while working with Webb in the film appear in Allen's memoirs.

Most of Webb's Broadway shows were musicals, but he also starred in Oscar Wilde's The Importance of Being Earnest, and his longtime friend Noël Coward's plays Blithe Spirit and Present Laughter.

=== Laura – established as character actor ===
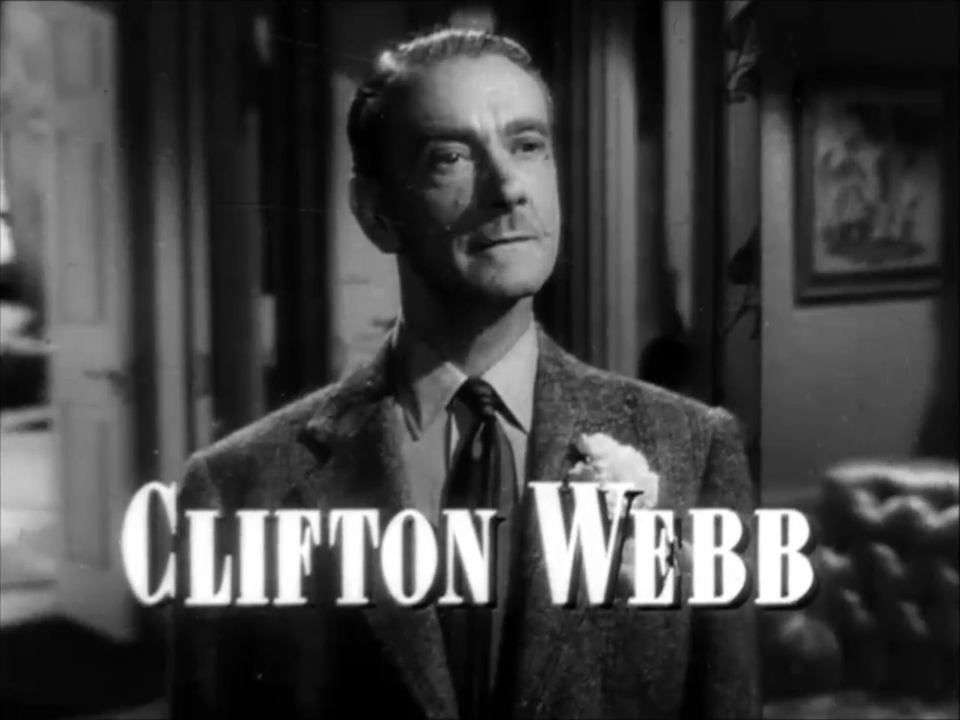
Webb's performance in Laura earned him an Academy Award nomination.

Webb was in his mid-fifties when actor/director Otto Preminger chose him over the objections of 20th Century Fox chief Darryl F. Zanuck to play the elegant but evil radio columnist Waldo Lydecker, who is obsessed with Gene Tierney's character in the 1944 film noir Laura. Zanuck reportedly found Webb too effeminate as a person and an actor; he wanted Laird Cregar to play the role; but Cregar by then was well established as an on-screen villain and Preminger wanted someone who would surprise the audience.

Webb's performance won him wide acclaim, and he received an Academy Award nomination for Best Actor in a Supporting Role. Despite Zanuck's original objection, Webb was signed to a long-term contract with Fox. He worked for them solely for the rest of his career. His first film under the contract was The Dark Corner (1946), a film noir directed by Henry Hathaway; as in Laura, Webb played a suave villain. He was then reunited with Tierney in another highly praised role as the elitist Elliott Templeton in The Razor's Edge (1946). He received another Academy Award nomination for Best Actor in a Supporting Role.

=== Sitting Pretty and stardom ===
Webb was billed in a starring role in Sitting Pretty, playing Mr. Belvedere, a snide, know-it-all babysitter. It was a huge hit and Webb received an Oscar nomination for Best Actor in a Leading Role. Fox promptly put Webb in a sequel, Mr. Belvedere Goes to College (1949) where Belvedere has to complete his college degree and acts as matchmaker. It was another box office success.

In the film Cheaper by the Dozen (1950), Webb and Myrna Loy played Frank and Lillian Gilbreth, real-life efficiency experts of the 1910s and 1920s, and the parents of 12 children. It resulted in Webb's third hit in a row and led to exhibitors voting him the seventh biggest star in the United States. Less successful at the box-office was For Heaven's Sake (1950) in which Webb played an angel trying to help a couple on earth. He made Mr. Belvedere Rings the Bell (1951), with Belvedere causing trouble in an old-folks home, but the film was not as successful at the box-office as the first two, resulting in the end of the series.

Webb played a father trying to cancel his daughter Anne Francis' marriage in Elopement (1952), a minor hit. He made a brief appearance in Belles on Their Toes (1952), on a sequel to Cheaper by the Dozen, which covered the family's life after the death of the father. He then starred in Dreamboat (1952) as college professor Thornton Sayre, who in his younger days was known as silent-film idol Bruce "Dreamboat" Blair. Now a distinguished academic who wants no part of his past fame, he sets out to stop the showing of his old films on television. The film concludes with Webb's alter ego Sayre watching himself star in Sitting Pretty.

Around the same time, he starred in the Technicolor film biography of bandmaster John Philip Sousa, Stars and Stripes Forever (also 1952). He was a Belvedere-like scoutmaster in Mister Scoutmaster (1953). Webb had his most dramatic role as the doomed but brave husband of unfaithful Barbara Stanwyck in Titanic (also 1953). Writer Walter Reisch says this movie was created in part as a vehicle for Webb by Fox, who wanted to push Webb into more serious roles. Soon afterward, he played the (fictional) novelist John Frederick Shadwell in Three Coins in the Fountain (1954), romancing Dorothy McGuire. It was a huge hit. He was top billed as a company owner in Woman's World (1954), a corporate drama.

The British film The Man Who Never Was (1956) featured Webb playing the part of Royal Navy Lt. Cmdr. Ewen Montagu in the true story of Operation Mincemeat, the elaborate plan to deceive the Axis powers about the Allied invasion of Sicily during World War II. In Boy on a Dolphin (1957), second-billed to Alan Ladd, with third-billed Sophia Loren, he portrayed a wealthy sophisticate who enjoyed collecting illegally obtained Greek antiquities. In a nod to his own identity, the character's name was Victor Parmalee.

He starred in The Remarkable Mr. Pennypacker (1959), a comedy, as a man with two families, and Holiday for Lovers (1959), a family comedy set in South America. Neither was particularly successful. Fox was developing Journey to the Center of the Earth (1959) as a vehicle for Webb, but when he fell ill and was unable to work, James Mason stepped into the role. Webb's final film role was an initially sarcastic, but ultimately self-sacrificing Catholic priest in Leo McCarey's Satan Never Sleeps (1962). The film showed the victory of Mao Tse-tung's armies in the Chinese Civil War, which ended with his ascension to power in 1949, but was actually filmed in Britain during the summer of 1961, using sets left from the film The Inn of the Sixth Happiness (1958), which was also set in China.

Webb was honored with a star on the Hollywood Walk of Fame at 6850 Hollywood Boulevard for his contributions to the motion picture industry.

Webb's portrayal of Lynn Belvedere was the model for the Mr. Peabody character in the "Peabody's Improbable History" segment of the animated cartoon series The Adventures of Rocky and Bullwinkle and Friends. And the 1980s television sitcom Mr. Belvedere was based on Webb's character, with Christopher Hewett in the title role.

== Personal life ==
Throughout his career, Clifton Webb remained a confirmed bachelor and had no children. He lived with his mother until her death at age 91 in 1960, leading Noël Coward to remark, "It must be terrible to be orphaned at 71."

Actor Robert Wagner, who co-starred with Webb in the films Stars and Stripes Forever and Titanic and considered the actor one of his mentors, stated in his memoirs, Pieces of My Heart: A Life, that "Clifton Webb was gay, of course, but he never made a pass at me, not that he would have." According to a journal article published more than 40 years after Webb's death, his sexual orientation was frequently alluded to through many veiled references in entertainment newspaper columns, though the article does not note which ones.

On the Kraft Music Hall network radio broadcast of March 25, 1948, Webb exchanged banter with singer/actor Al Jolson and pianist/comedian Oscar Levant, with Webb, then near 60 himself, charging Jolson with "having aged". "You're not exactly a boy", responded Jolson, to which Levant added, "He's not exactly a girl, either."

== Later years and death ==
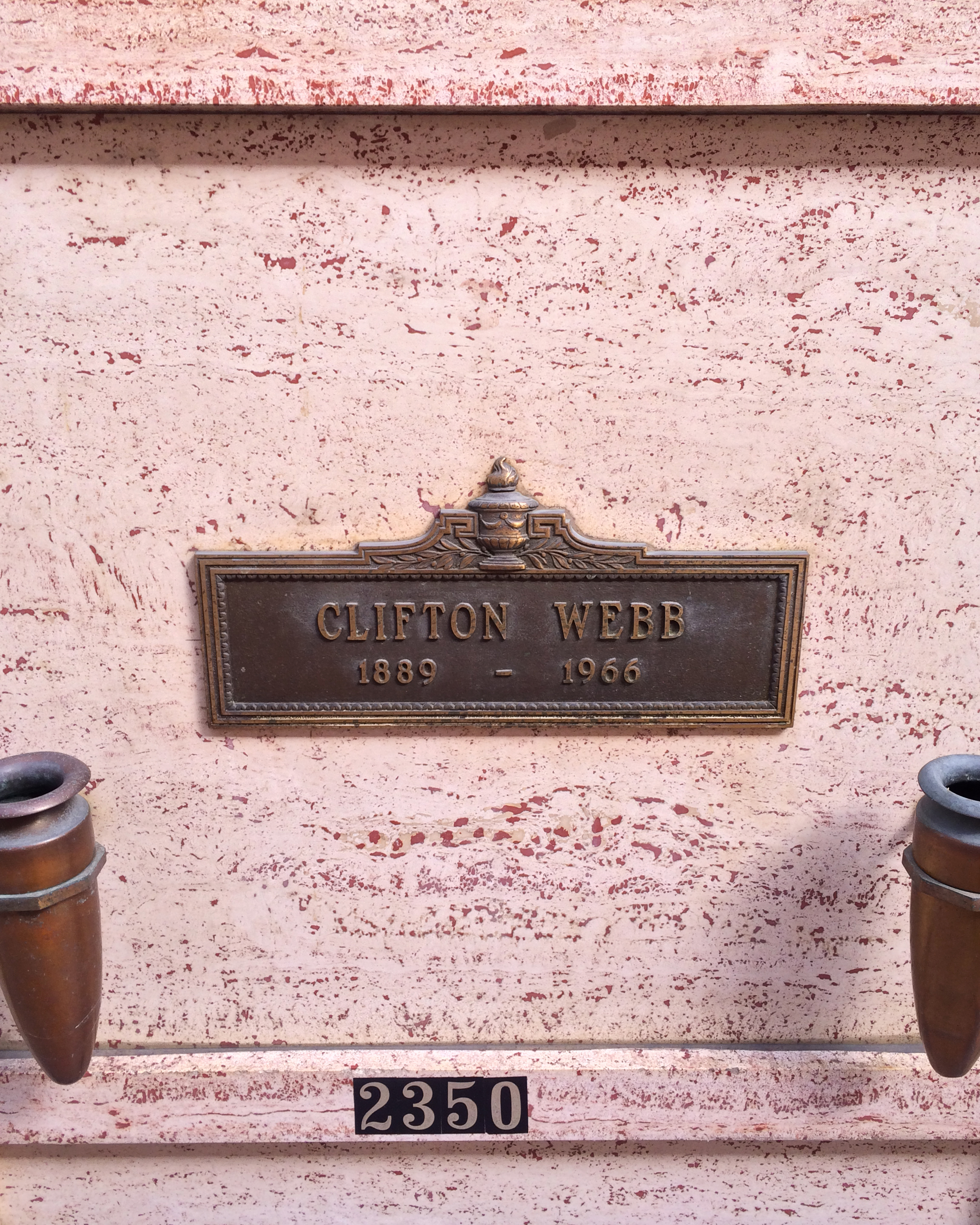
Webb's crypt at Hollywood Forever

Due to health problems, Webb spent the last five years of his life as a recluse at his home in Beverly Hills, California. On October 13, 1966, Webb suffered a fatal heart attack at his home; he was 76. He is interred in crypt 2350, corridor G-6, Abbey of the Psalms in Hollywood Forever Cemetery, alongside his mother.

== Legacy ==
UCLA School of Theater, Film and Television's Clifton Webb Scholarship, which was established in 1969, was named in honor of Webb.

== Complete filmography ==
| Year | Title | Role | Notes |
|---|---|---|---|
| 1917 | National Red Cross Pageant | Dancer, The Pavane – French episode | Lost film |
| 1920 | Polly With a Past | Harry Richardson | Uncredited; Lost film |
| 1924 | Let Not Man Put Asunder | Major Bertie | Uncredited; Lost film |
| 1925 | New Toys | Tom Lawrence | Lost film |
| 1925 | The Heart of a Siren | Maxim | Alternative title: The Heart of a Temptress |
| 1930 | The Still Alarm | | short Vitaphone film |
| 1944 | Laura | Waldo Lydecker | |
| 1946 | The Dark Corner | Hardy Cathcart | |
| 1946 | The Razor's Edge | Elliott Templeton | |
| 1948 | Sitting Pretty | Lynn Belvedere | |
| 1949 | Mr. Belvedere Goes to College | Lynn Aloysius Belvedere | |
| 1950 | Cheaper by the Dozen | Frank Bunker Gilbreth | |
| 1950 | For Heaven's Sake | Charles / Slim Charles | |
| 1951 | Mr. Belvedere Rings the Bell | Lynn Belvedere | Alternative title: Mr. Belvedere Blows His Whistle |
| 1951 | Elopement | Howard Osborne | |
| 1952 | Belles on Their Toes | Frank Bunker Gilbreth | Uncredited |
| 1952 | Dreamboat | Thornton Sayre / Dreamboat / Bruce Blair | |
| 1952 | Stars and Stripes Forever | John Philip Sousa | Alternative title: Marching Along |
| 1953 | Titanic | Richard Ward Sturges | |
| 1953 | Mister Scoutmaster | Robert Jordan | |
| 1954 | Three Coins in the Fountain | John Frederick Shadwell | |
| 1954 | Woman's World | Ernest Gifford | Alternative title: A Woman's World |
| 1956 | The Man Who Never Was | Lt. Cdr. Ewen Montagu | |
| 1957 | Boy on a Dolphin | Victor Parmalee | |
| 1959 | The Remarkable Mr. Pennypacker | Mr. Horace Pennypacker | |
| 1959 | Holiday for Lovers | Robert Dean | |
| 1962 | Satan Never Sleeps | Father Bovard | Alternative titles: The Devil Never Sleeps; Flight from Terror, (final film role) |

=== Box office ranking ===
For a number of years film exhibitors voted Webb among the most popular stars in the country:

- 1949: 14th (U.S.)
- 1950: 7th (U.S.)
- 1951: 21st (U.S.)

== Stage work ==
- The Master of Carlton Hall (Children's Theatre) (1902)
- The Purple Road (1913)
- Dancing Around (1914)
- Ned Wayburn's Town Topics (1915)
- See America First (1916)
- Love O' Mike (1917)
- Listen Lester (1918)
- As You Were (1920)
- Fun at the Faire (1921)
- Phi-Phi (1922)
- Jack and Jill (1923)
- Meet the Wife (1923)
- Parasites (1924)
- Sunny (1925)
- She's My Baby (1928)
- Treasure Girl (1928)
- The Little Show (1929)
- Three's a Crowd (1930)
- Flying Colors (1932)
- As Thousands Cheer (1933)
- And Stars Remain (1936)
- You Never Know (1938)
- The Importance of Being Earnest (1939)
- Blithe Spirit (1941)
- Present Laughter (1946)

== Radio appearances ==
| Year | Program | Episode | Co Star | Notes |
|---|---|---|---|---|
| 1945 | Suspense | "The Burning Court" | n/a | |
| 1949 | Lux Radio Theatre | "Sitting Pretty" | w/ Robert Young | |
| 1950 | Lux Radio Theatre | "Mr. Belvedere Goes to College" | w/ Robert Stack | |
| 1950 | Lux Radio Theatre | "The Man Who Came To Dinner" | w/ Lucille Ball | |
| 1950 | The Big Show | n/a | w/ Tallulah Bankhead & Jimmy Durante | |
| 1951 | Lux Radio Theatre | "Cheaper by the Dozen" | w/ Rhoda Williams | |

== Awards and nominations ==
| Year | Award | Category | Nominated work | Result | Ref. |
|---|---|---|---|---|---|
| 1944 | Academy Awards | Best Supporting Actor | Laura | Nominated | |
| 1946 | Academy Awards | Best Supporting Actor | The Razor's Edge | Nominated | |
| 1949 | Academy Awards | Best Actor | Sitting Pretty | Nominated | |
| 1946 | Golden Globe Awards | Best Supporting Actor – Motion Picture | The Razor's Edge | Won | |
| 1952 | Golden Globe Awards | Best Actor in a Motion Picture – Musical or Comedy | Stars and Stripes Forever | Nominated | |

== See also ==
- List of actors with Academy Award nominations
