= Say When (musical) =

1934 musical by Ray Henderson, Ted Koehler & Jack McGowan

Say When is an American musical with music by Ray Henderson, lyrics by Ted Koehler, and a musical book by Jack McGowan. Directed by Bertram Harrison, the production opened on Broadway at the Imperial Theatre where it ran from November 8, 1934, through January 12, 1935 for a total of 76 performances.
