= Stars and Stripes Forever (film) =

1952 American biographical film directed by Henry Koster

- Theatrical release poster
- Directed by: Henry Koster
- Screenplay by: Lamar Trotti
- Story by: Ernest Vajda
- Based on: Marching Along by John Philip Sousa
- Produced by: Lamar Trotti
- Starring: Clifton Webb; Debra Paget; Robert Wagner; Ruth Hussey
- Narrated by: Casey Adams
- Cinematography: Charles G. Clarke
- Edited by: James B. Clark
- Music by: Leo Arnaud; Alfred Newman
- Distributed by: 20th Century Fox
- Release date: December 22, 1952
- Running time: 90 minutes
- Country: United States
- Language: English
- Box office: $3 million (US rentals)

Stars and Stripes Forever is a 1952 American musical biographical film directed by Henry Koster, based on the life of composer and band leader John Philip Sousa. The film was produced by Lamar Trotti, distributed by 20th Century Fox, was filmed in Technicolor. It stars Clifton Webb, Debra Paget, Robert Wagner, and Ruth Hussey. The film's title is taken from Sousa's 1896 composition "The Stars and Stripes Forever", which has become the best known of his military marches. The film was released twenty years after Sousa's death. It received generally positive reviews.

== Plot ==
In the 1890s, Sergeant Major John Philip Sousa, director of the United States Marine Band, leaves the Marine Corps after his enlistment expires to form his own band. He does so because he is not paid enough by the Corps to provide for his wife Jennie and their three children. As a favor for his service, he can take along Private Willie Little, who has invented and played a new instrument, the "Sousaphone."

Willie persuades Sousa to go to a "concert" where some of Sousa's songs will be performed. In fact, it is a rowdy music hall, where Willie's girlfriend, Lily Becker, is one of the performers. When the police raid the place for indecency (by 1890s standards), the trio barely manage to get away. Willie and Lily immediately begin to fit in, eventually becoming an extension of the Sousa family.

Sousa forms his band and selects only the finest musicians worldwide. He firmly discourages the married men in the band from bringing their wives along on tour. However, Willie and Lily are deeply in love, secretly married and tour together in the new band. Late one night, Sousa is shocked when he spots Willie sneaking into Lily's train compartment. Sousa's wife has to let him in on their secret.

It is 1895. Sousa's contract to perform at the Cotton States Exposition in Atlanta, Georgia, is canceled by Colonel Randolph because both previous bands proved to be unpopular at the exposition. Sousa heads south anyway. His musicians strike up "Dixie" as the band marches onto the exposition grounds, putting the large crowd in a jubilant, receptive mood. The playlist for Sousa's twice-daily concerts is announced: it includes "Dixie" to be played as often as possible and for all encores. Sousa and his band are heartily welcomed to the Atlanta exposition. Sousa then surprises the otherwise all-white audience by introducing a black choral group called the Stone Mountain Church Choir of Atlanta, to sing the Battle Hymn of the Republic.

Sousa and his band tour the world, and he is honored with medals by the crowned heads of Europe. When the USS Maine is sunk by an explosion in Havana harbor, precipitating the Spanish–American War, both Willie and Sousa reenlist in the Marine Corps. However, Sousa is kept out of the actual fighting and instead is forced to go on a sea voyage to recover from a bout of typhoid fever. At sea, he begins a new march inspired by the war.

During the rehearsal of Sousa's new operetta El Capitan, starring Lily, the Sousas receive a letter from Willie in Cuba in which he reveals he was wounded in the knee (his lower left leg is later amputated). Following the end of the war, Willie returns home and recuperates at the Brooklyn Navy Yard Hospital. Willie and Lily attend a small weekly concert held at the hospital. As a surprise, the curtain opens and Sousa and his 50-piece band are revealed. Sousa calls upon Willie to rejoin them on his Sousaphone in a concert for the wounded veterans, their families, and the medical staff. Sousa announces that he has written a new march for all the veterans of the war and that this performance will be its debut.

The band launches into the film's title march, as we move forward in time to the present day. Battalions of uniformed U.S. Marines march in formation to the martial music. In modern Washington D.C., the ghostly spirit of Sousa leads the United States Marine Band while they perform "The Stars and Stripes Forever" to its rousing conclusion.

== Cast ==
- Clifton Webb as John Philip Sousa
- Debra Paget as Lily Becker
- Robert Wagner as Willie Little
- Ruth Hussey as Jennie Sousa
- Finlay Currie as Col. Randolph, on Atlanta fairgrounds
- Roy Roberts as Maj. Houston, Sousa's commanding officer
- Thomas Browne Henry as David Blakely, Sousa's business manager
- Lester Matthews as Mr. Pickering
- Maudie Prickett as Maid
- Walter Woolf King as President Harrison's aide
- Romo Vincent as Lily's vocal coach
- Paul Maxey as Sousa's publisher
- Richard Garrick as Secretary of the Navy
- Erne Verebes as organ grinder
- Roy Gordon as Benjamin Harrison
- Florence Shirley as Navy nurse
- Heinie Conklin as smiling spectator in Atlanta
- Blue Washington as spectator
- George Chakiris as ballroom dancer (uncredited)
- Casey Adams as Narrator (uncredited)

== Production ==
Twentieth Century-Fox first announced the production in December 1942, as a patriotic musical for wartime audiences. It was postponed because there were delays in gathering all the original Sousa arrangements and scores. The film finally went into production in April 1952, too late to be completed in time for Fourth of July playdates in theaters, so it was scheduled as Fox's Christmas release in December 1952. Fox did not consider waiting until the following summer, because its new, widescreen CinemaScope process was about to be unveiled. Stars and Stripes Forever became the last of the studio's major musicals filmed in the traditional, full-screen format.

While the film's storyline is loosely based on Sousa's autobiography Marching Along, the film takes considerable liberties and dramatic license, often expanding and examining themes and passages from Sousa's book. In the film, Private Willie Little (Robert Wagner), is credited with inventing the Sousaphone and naming it after his idol, but in reality, James Welsh Pepper designed the instrument at Sousa's request. The inspiration for the film's title march is depicted in a scene with a voiceover by Webb quoting Sousa's actual description of its creation while he was aboard ship recovering from typhoid fever. Having learned of the sudden death of his band's manager, Sousa and his wife canceled their European vacation and were returning to the U.S. by steamship when the march came to him.

== Reception ==
Stars and Stripes Forever was well received by critics and audiences. Film Bulletin reported: "This lively and ingratiating biography of John Philip Sousa... is the kind of movie that will send patrons marching to theatre boxoffices everywhere. Stars and Stripes Forever is not a serious biography, just a good-natured sketch of the March King's career, but it loaded with human interest and humorous incidents that should capture the imagination of audiences, as did Sousa himself." Bosley Crowther, film critic for The New York Times, wrote that "This big, brassy Technicolored picture ... is, in substance, a rambling review of the musical triumphs of the famous bandmaster, whom Clifton Webb regally plays. And as such, it is much more rewarding in its thumpings and boomings of a rousing band than it is in its illuminations of personalities or plot".

== Music ==
The "Presidential Polonaise", a Sousa composition, may be heard during the White House scene in which the President is hounded by a senator about a postmaster appointment. President Benjamin Harrison sends a request for a more lively piece of music in order to speed up the reception line, and Sousa and his band strike up "Semper Fidelis". Both pieces were specifically written by Sousa for White House functions: the "Presidential Polonaise" for indoor events, "Semper Fidelis" for outdoor functions.

The scene in which Sousa reads of Willie's being wounded in action takes place during a rehearsal of El Capitan. While the love song "I'm Afraid," which opens and closes the rehearsal scene, has no relation to Sousa — it was written by Hollywood composer Alfred Newman — the middle of the scene is played over a male voice singing "Behold El Capitan," a real song from the 1896 operetta.

In reality, "The Stars and Stripes Forever" was first played publicly at the Academy of Music in Philadelphia on May 14, 1897, much earlier than the hospital concert depicted at the conclusion of the film. Ninety years later, by a 1987 act of the U.S. Congress, it was made the official National March of the United States of America.

During the overture, which is played over the title credits, there are excerpts from many Sousa marches. The drum solo is a shortened version of the "Semper Fidelis" solo.

== Home media ==
Stars and Stripes Forever was released in 2011 on a combo Blu-ray and DVD 2-disc set from 20th Century Fox Home Entertainment. It also contains two documentaries, "From Our National March to the Silver Screen" and "John Philip Sousa's Contribution to American Music". Also included: the original theatrical trailer and selections from the film's pressbook, advertising, and still photo galleries.
