= New Toys =

1925 film

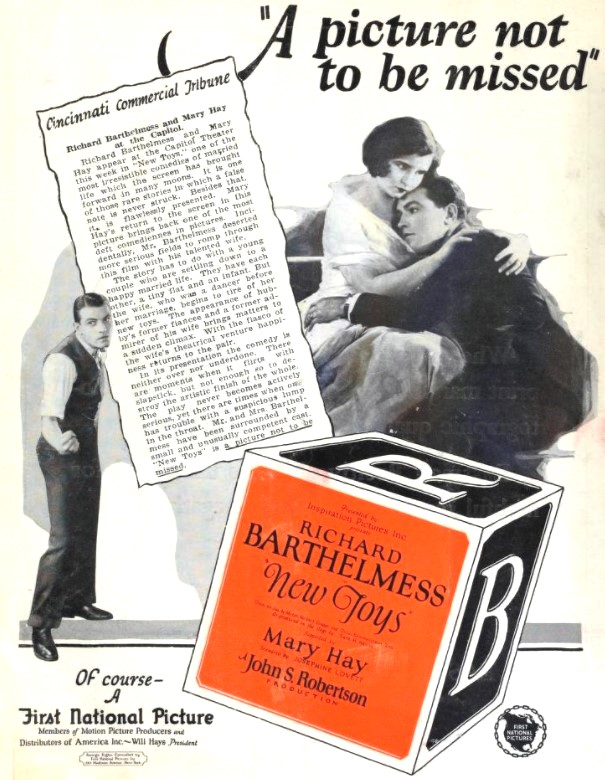
- Advertisement
- Directed by: John S. Robertson
- Screenplay by: Josephine Lovett; Agnes Smith
- Based on: New Toys by: Oscar Hammerstein II; Milton Herbert Gropper
- Starring: Richard Barthelmess; Mary Hay; Katherine Wilson; Clifton Webb
- Cinematography: Roy Overbaugh
- Edited by: William Hamilton
- Production company: Inspiration Pictures
- Distributed by: First National Pictures
- Release date: March 1, 1925
- Running time: 80 minutes
- Country: United States
- Language: Silent (English intertitles)

New Toys is a 1925 American comedy film directed by John S. Robertson and written by Josephine Lovett and Agnes Smith. It is based on the 1924 play New Toys by Oscar Hammerstein II and Milton Herbert Gropper. The film stars Richard Barthelmess, Mary Hay, Katherine Wilson, Clifton Webb, Francis Conlon, and Bijou Fernandez. The film was released on March 1, 1925, by First National Pictures.

== Plot ==
As described in a film magazine review, Will Webb accepts tickets to an amateur performance from his fiancee, Natalie, as she sails for Europe, and there he meets and falls in love with Mary Lane. He marries her. They live in a Harlem flat and have a baby. Natalie returns, still considering that Will belongs to her. She visits them, throwing Will into terror and arousing Mary’s jealousy. Natalie tries to win Will back, and Mary accepts Tom awrence’s suggestion that she should have a career for herself on the stage. The premiere is a complete flop due to a trip and the antics of her false nose. Will fears Mary has killed herself. He escapes from Natalie and finds Mary still in her dressing room at the theatre. They are reconciled.

== Cast ==
- Richard Barthelmess as Will Webb
- Mary Hay as Mary Lane
- Katherine Wilson as Natalie Woods
- Clifton Webb as Tom Lawrence
- Francis Conlon as Sam Clark
- Bijou Fernandez as Mrs. Lane
- Tammany Young as Doorman
- Pat O'Connor as Will Webb Jr.
- Jules Jordan as Blumberg
- Jacob Kingsbury as Blutz
- Laura Lacillade

== Preservation ==
With no prints of New Toys located in any film archives, it is a lost film.
