= Mary Jane McKane =

- Sheet Music Cover
- Music: Herbert Stothart & Vincent Youmans
- Lyrics: William Cary Duncan & Oscar Hammerstein, II
- Book: William Cary Duncan & Oscar Hammerstein, II

Mary Jane McKane is a musical comedy in three acts with book and lyrics by William Cary Duncan and Oscar Hammerstein, II and music by Herbert Stothart and Vincent Youmans. The show was produced by Arthur Hammerstein at the Imperial Theatre, and opened December 25, 1923.

It was staged by Alonzo Price, choreographed by Sammy Lee, music director Herbert Stothart, costume design by Charles LeMaire, and scenic design by Frank E. Gates and Edward A. Morange. It ran for 151 performances, closing on May 3, 1924.

The cast of included Mary Hay (Mary Jane McKane), Eva Clark (Louise Dryer), James Heenan (Andrew Dunn, Sr.), Kitty Kelly (Maggie Murphy), Louis Morrell (George Sherwin), Stanley Ridges (Andrew Dunn, Jr.), Hal Skelly (Joe McGillicudy), and Dallas Welford (Martin Frost).

Set in New York City, the plot concerns a cute country girl named Mary Jane (Mary Hay) who applies for a job in the Dunns’ offices. Although she is a good stenographer, they are concerned about hiring her because she is too pretty for Andrew Dunn, Jr. (Stanley Ridges). She gets the job by slicking down her bobbed hair and putting on goggles. Later, after Mr. Dunn Sr. (James Heenan) fires Jr., Mary Jane goes into business with Jr. and get betrothed in the last act.

Opening night of Mary Jane McKane was also the inaugural performance for the new Imperial Theater at 45th Street, west of Broadway. The New York Times reported that Miss Hay “emerged, let it be recorded, as a sweet, comely, tuneful and most appealing heroine.”

== Songs ==
Act 1

- “The Rumble of the Subway”
- “Speed”
- “Not in Business Hours”
- “Stick to Your Knitting”
- “My Boy and I”
- “Toddle-oo”
- “Down Where the Mortgages Grow”

Act 2

- “Time-Clock Slaves”
- “Laugh It Off”
- “Stick to Your Knitting” (reprise)
- “The Flannel Petticoat Gal”

Act 3

- “Thistledown"
- “Toodle-oo” (reprise)
- “Mary Jane McKane”

== Sources ==
- Boardman, Gerald. Days to Be Happy, Years to Be Sad, New York: Oxford University Press(1982)
