= Imperial Theatre =

Broadway theater in Manhattan, New York

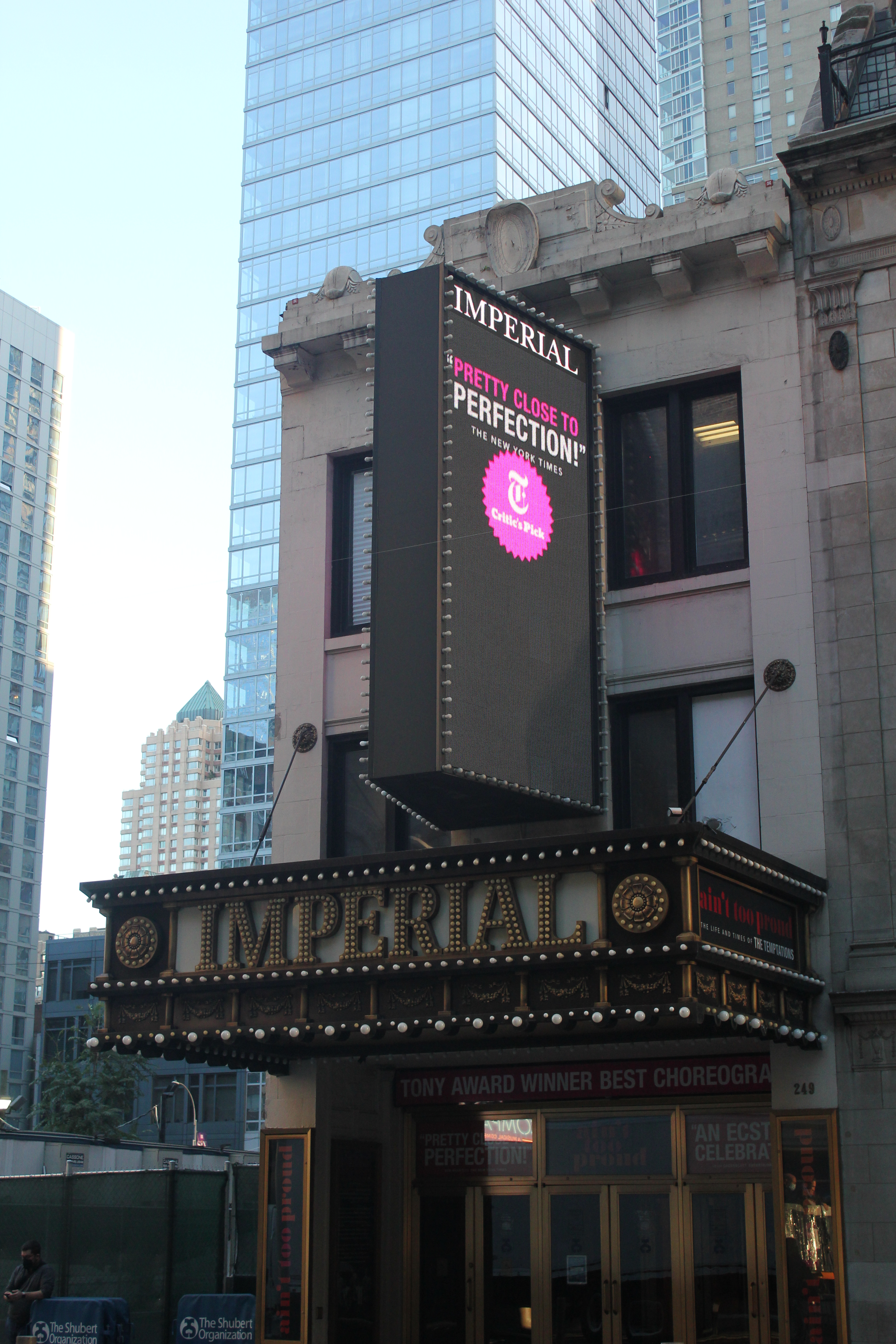
- The 45th Street entrance as seen in October 2021
- Interactive map of Imperial Theatre
- Address: 249 West 45th Street; Manhattan, New York; United States
- Coordinates: 40°45′33″N 73°59′14″W
- Owner: The Shubert Organization
- Capacity: 1,457
- Type: Broadway
- Production: 860

Construction
- Opened: December 25, 1923 (102 years ago)
- Architect: Herbert J. Krapp

Website
- Official website

New York City Landmark
- Designated: November 17, 1987
- Reference no.: 1343
- Designated entity: Auditorium interior

The Imperial Theatre is a Broadway theater at 249 West 45th Street (George Abbott Way) in the Theater District of Midtown Manhattan in New York City, New York, U.S. Opened in 1923, the Imperial Theatre was designed by Herbert J. Krapp and was constructed for the Shubert brothers. It has 1,457 seats across two levels and is operated by The Shubert Organization. The auditorium interior is a New York City designated landmark.

The theater is largely situated on 46th Street. A narrow lobby extends to the main entrance on 45th Street, where there is a three-story facade of white terracotta. The 46th Street facade, which is made of buff-colored brick, was intended as the carriage entrance. The lobby, originally decorated in dark and white tiles, leads to the rear of the theater's orchestra level. The auditorium contains Adam-style detailing, a large balcony, and box seats with carved panels above them. The flat proscenium arch above the stage is topped by a curved sounding board.

The Shubert Organization's fiftieth venue in New York City, the Imperial was constructed in 1923 to replace the outdated Lyric Theatre. The Imperial opened on December 25, 1923, with the musical Mary Jane McKane. Since then, it has hosted numerous long-running musicals, including Annie Get Your Gun, Fiddler on the Roof, Dreamgirls, The Mystery of Edwin Drood, Les Misérables, and Billy Elliot the Musical. The Imperial has also hosted plays, with Chapter Two being the theater's longest-running play.

== Site ==
The Imperial Theatre is on 249 West 45th Street, on the north sidewalk between Eighth Avenue and Broadway, near Times Square in the Theater District of Midtown Manhattan in New York City, New York, U.S. The land lot covers 13,350 square feet (1,240 m^{2}), with a frontage of 20 feet (6.1 m) on 45th Street and a depth of 200 feet (61 m). The portion of the lot on 45th Street is narrower than the section on 46th Street, where the auditorium is situated. The auditorium section, spanning the lots at 238 to 250 West 46th Street, measures 113 feet (34 m) wide by 100 feet (30 m) deep.

The adjoining block of 45th Street is also known as George Abbott Way, and foot traffic on the street increases box-office totals on the theaters there. The Imperial shares the block with the Richard Rodgers Theatre and Music Box Theatre to the east, as well as the New York Marriott Marquis to the east. Other nearby buildings include the Paramount Hotel and Lena Horne Theatre to the north; the Hotel Edison and Lunt-Fontanne Theatre to the northeast; One Astor Plaza to the southeast; the Gerald Schoenfeld, Booth, Shubert, and Broadhurst Theatres to the south; and the Majestic, Bernard B. Jacobs, and John Golden Theatres to the southwest. The site was historically part of the Astor family estate, which acquired the lots in 1803.

== Design ==
The Imperial Theatre was designed by Herbert J. Krapp and was constructed in 1923 for the Shubert brothers. It was the fiftieth theater to be developed by the Shuberts in the New York metropolitan area. The O'Day Construction Company built the theater, and several other contractors were involved in the construction process. The Imperial is operated by the Shubert Organization.

=== Facade ===
The theater includes a narrow wing extending south to 45th Street, though the auditorium is on 46th Street. The main entrance of the theater is through 45th Street, where there is a white terracotta facade. The 45th Street entrance is a three-story building. It is extremely narrow because it was wedged between the now-demolished Klaw Theatre to the west and the Music Box Theatre to the east. Aside from signs on the facade, it is designed in a plain style. This was characteristic of most post-World War I theaters that Krapp designed for the Shuberts, such as the Ambassador Theatre and the Ritz (now Walter Kerr) Theatre.

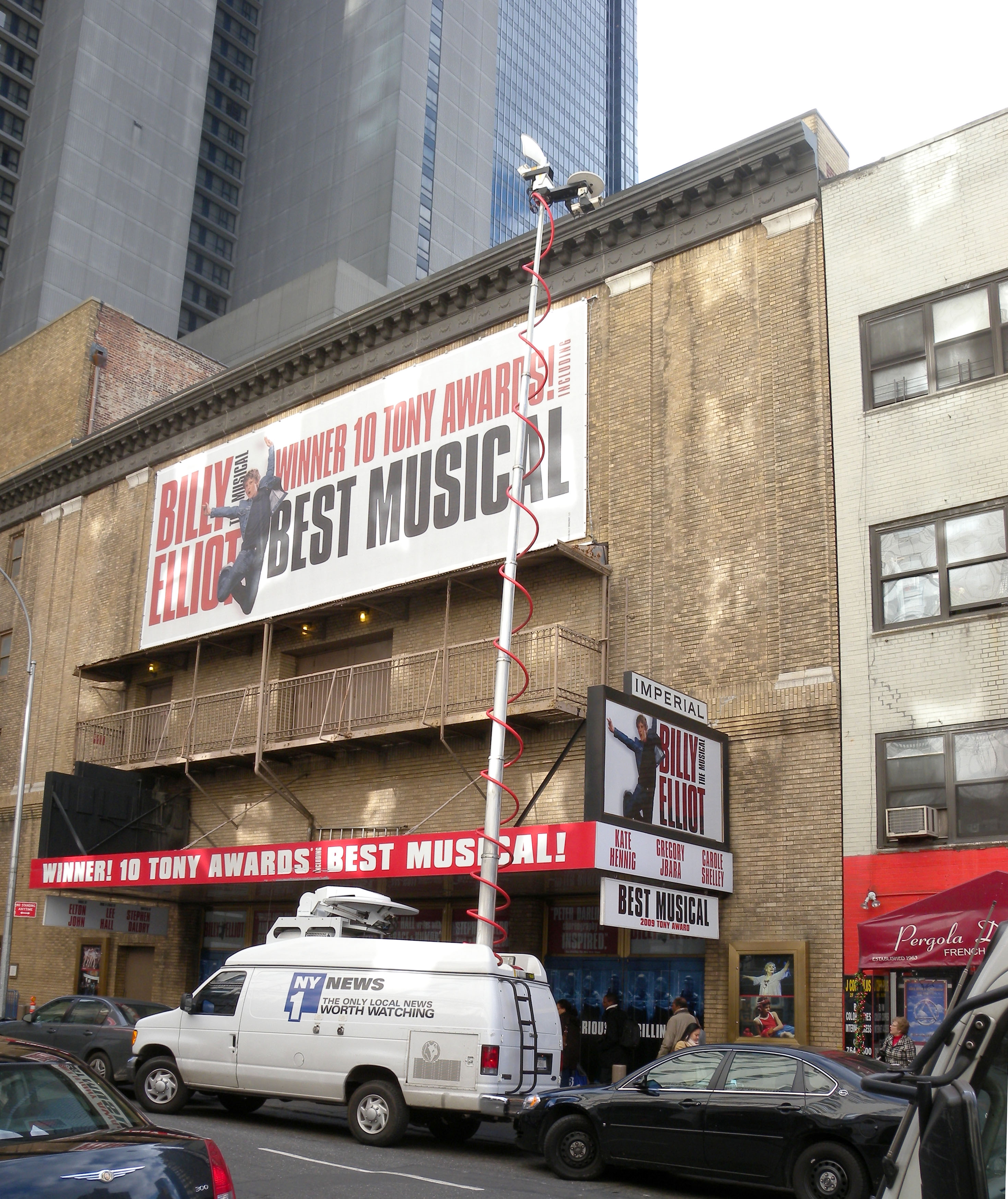
Rear facade of the auditorium

The facade of the auditorium is made of buff-colored brick and faces 46th Street. This facade, being much wider, was used as a carriage entrance and exit, alleviating congestion on 45th Street. The design of the 46th Street facade contains diaper-patterned brick, similar to the facades of the Ambassador, the Ritz, and the now-demolished Morosco. A stage door is placed on the eastern section of the facade, next to the Richard Rodgers Theatre. According to theatrical historian William Morrison, both of the Imperial's facades "cannot be said to be particularly distinguished".

=== Auditorium ===
The auditorium has an orchestra level, one balcony, boxes, and a stage behind the proscenium arch. The auditorium is wider than its depth, and the space is designed with plaster decorations in high relief. According to the Shubert Organization, the auditorium has 1,457 seats; meanwhile, The Broadway League cites a capacity of 1,443 seats and Playbill cites 1,424 seats. The physical seats are divided into 759 seats in the orchestra, 283 in the front balcony, 377 in the rear balcony, and 20 in the boxes. The orchestra seating includes 18 seats in the orchestra pit at the front of the stage. Originally, the theater was designed with 1,650 seats: 950 on the balcony and 700 in the orchestra. It is largely designed in the Adam style.

==== Seating areas ====
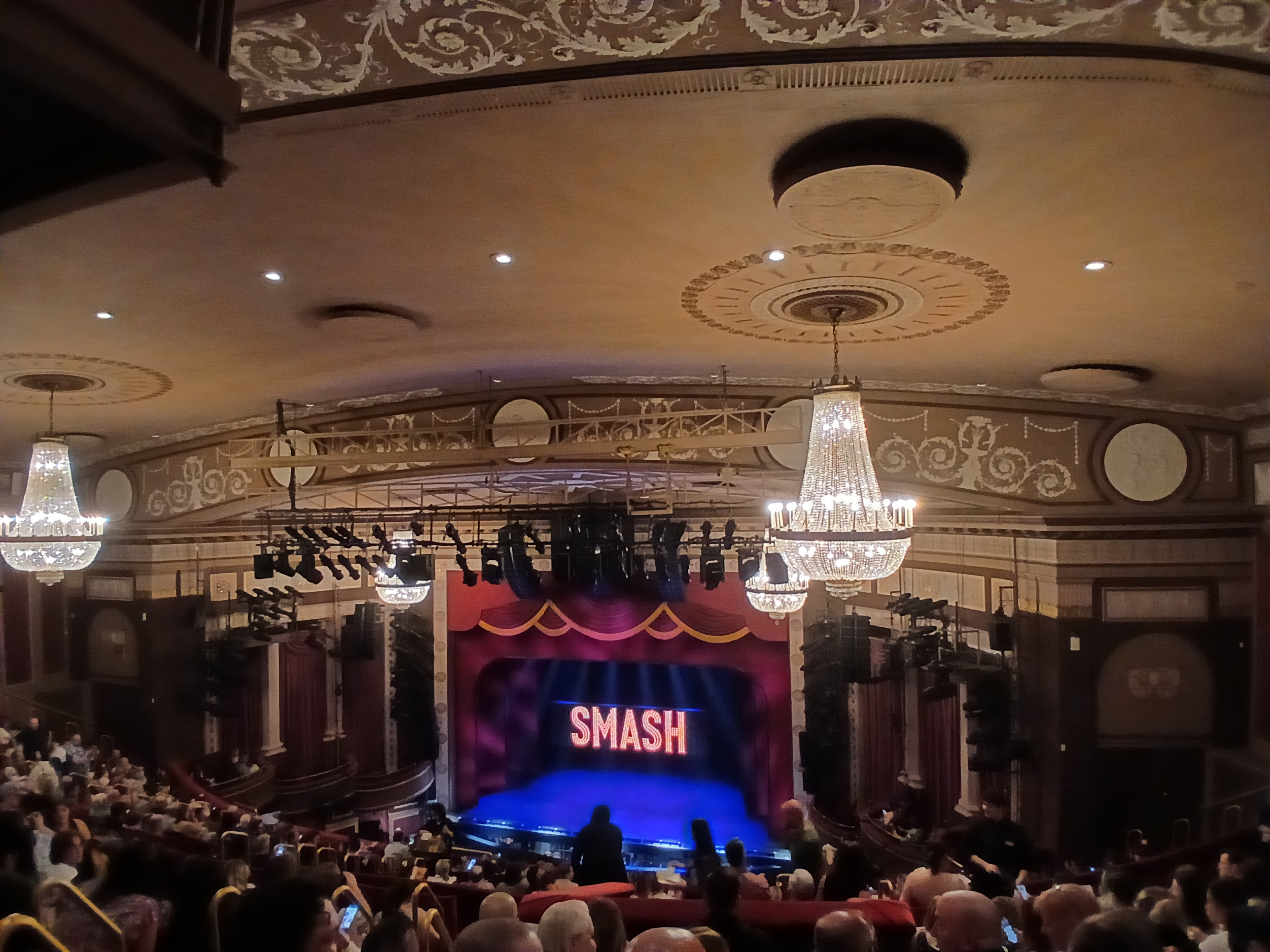
Interior of the auditorium, looking toward the proscenium arch

A passageway from the 45th Street entrance, measuring 20 feet (6.1 m) wide, leads to a promenade at the rear (west) end of the orchestra. The entrance passageway was originally designed with a light-and-dark tiled floor, marble wainscoting, and white travertine wall panels; the travertine was subsequently replaced with red-brown and gray marble. The orchestra promenade has a pair of columns topped by Tuscan-style capitals, as well as a paneled ceiling with bands in the Adam style. Two staircases lead from the promenade to the balcony level above. The orchestra floor is raked, while its side walls curve inward toward the proscenium. The orchestra's side walls contain wainscoting on their lower sections, with paneling above. On the north (left) wall are exit doors leading to 46th Street, above which is a frieze. The seating was arranged in a shallow, fan-shaped layout to increase acoustics.

A crossover aisle divides the balcony into front and rear sections. The balcony's side walls contain flat pilasters, which split the walls into segmentally arched sections. The wall sections include panels with bas-reliefs of dancing figures, as well as doorways with Adam-style friezes. The balcony's walls are topped by a frieze with foliate ornament and a cornice with modillions, which wraps around the front of the auditorium. Light boxes are installed on the front rail of the balcony, which has no ornamentation. The underside of the balcony, over the orchestra, has ornate paneling.

On either side of the proscenium is a wall section with three boxes on the balcony level, which step down toward the stage. The theater was originally designed with boxes on orchestra level as well, though these have been removed. The fronts of the boxes are curved outward and contain molded decorations at the top and bottom. The boxes on each side are set into rectangular openings, which contain a pair of octagonal columns that divide the boxes. Each opening is surrounded by a band of foliate and geometric designs in plasterwork. Above the openings are rectangular plasterwork panels. Within these panels are depictions of winged fairy-like figures, holding theatrical masks that represent comedy and tragedy.

==== Other design features ====
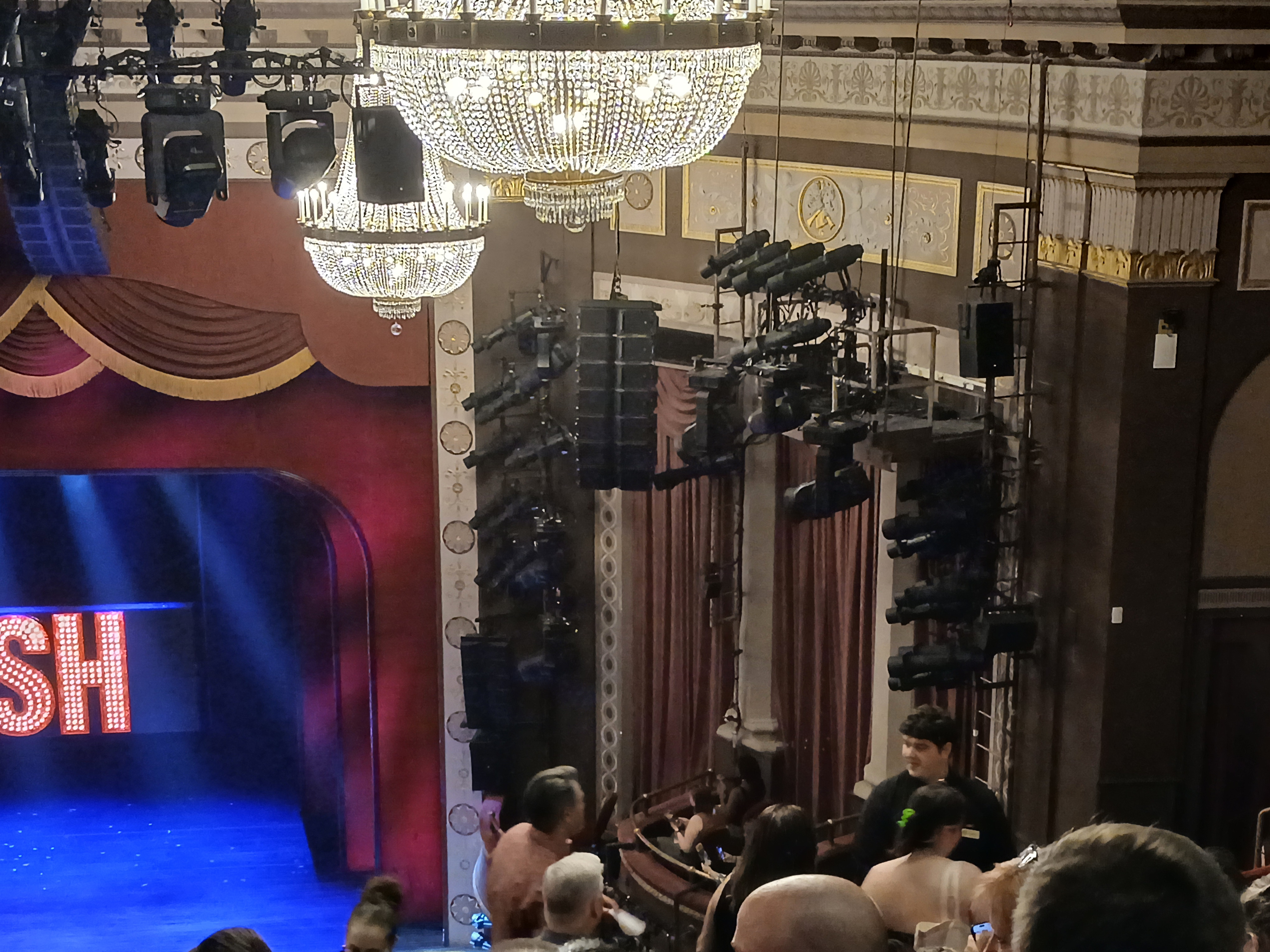
The right-hand boxes

Next to the boxes is a flat proscenium arch. The archway is surrounded by a band of floral designs in plasterwork. In addition, on either side of the archway are flat pilasters, topped by decorative capitals. The frieze and cornice, from above the balcony level, continues above the arch. The proscenium measures 25 feet 0 inches (7.62 m) high and 39 feet 7 inches (12.07 m) wide. The depth of the auditorium to the proscenium is 33 feet 8 inches (10.26 m), while the depth to the front of the stage is 40 feet 2 inches (12.24 m).

A sounding board is placed on the ceiling above the proscenium arch. The sounding board contains a band with foliate ornamentation, with a latticework panel at the center. The rest of the ceiling contains a slight curve and shallow coves, which were intended to give the theater an intimate feeling. The ceiling is slightly higher than the sounding board, creating a rib near the front of the auditorium, where the ceiling steps down to the sounding board. The front rib contains Adam-style bas-relief plaster decorations, as well as circular bas-relief medallions. The rest of the ceiling contains panels surrounded by decorative bands, with medallions in the center of each panel. The panels are divided by ribs with decorative bands. Chandeliers were originally suspended from the ceiling panels, and there is low relief decoration throughout. The modern ceiling has replacement chandeliers as well as air-conditioning grates.

== History ==
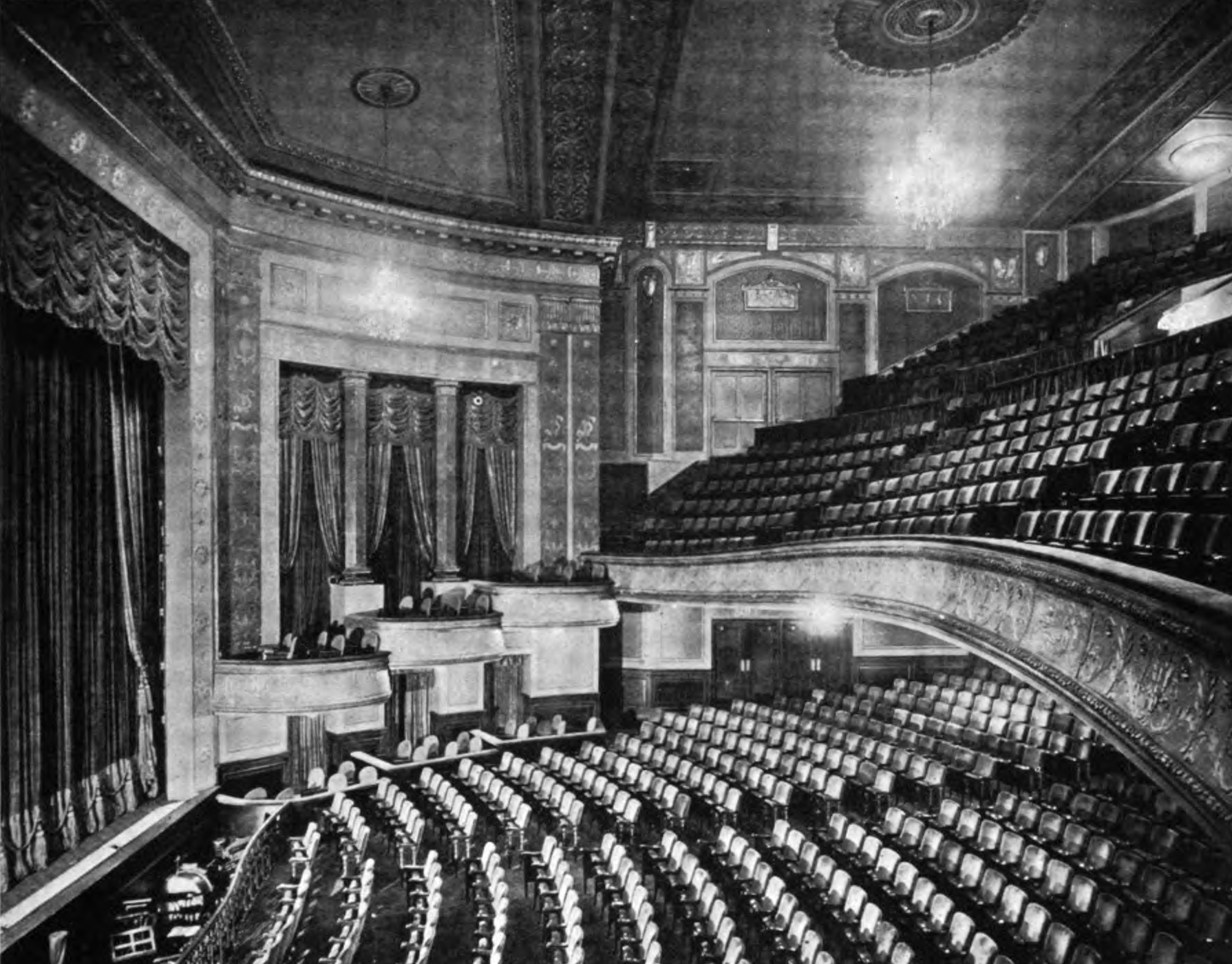
Historical view (1924)

Times Square became the epicenter for large-scale theater productions between 1900 and the Great Depression. During the 1900s and 1910s, many theaters in Midtown Manhattan were developed by the Shubert brothers, one of the major theatrical syndicates of the time. The Shuberts originated from Syracuse, New York, and expanded downstate into New York City in the first decade of the 20th century. The brothers controlled a quarter of all plays and three-quarters of theatrical ticket sales in the U.S. by 1925. The Shubert brothers had leased the Lyric Theatre for their musical productions in 1903, but they were looking for a replacement two decades later, as the Lyric was aging.

=== Development and early years ===
The Shubert brothers decided to acquire lots along both 45th and 46th Street. While the 45th Street frontage was more desirable (being close to numerous existing theaters), the 46th Street frontage was cheaper. The site was acquired by A. H. Pincus and M. L. Goldstone, who in November 1922 began planning for a two-story office and three-story theater. The Shuberts hired Herbert Krapp to design the theater in January 1923. L. & A. Pincus helped finance the construction, along with the Shuberts and the 45th Street Leasing Company Inc. The Imperial Theatre was not named as such until December 1923, a few weeks before its opening. At that time, Arthur Hammerstein and Vincent Youmans's production Mary Jane McKane was booked for the theater, with a musical score by Oscar Hammerstein II. Arthur had been negotiating with Lee Shubert to name the Imperial Theatre after Arthur's late father Oscar Hammerstein I, but Shubert rejected the proposal.

Mary Jane star Mary Hay formally dedicated the Imperial on December 21, 1923, and the Imperial had its first performance when Mary Jane premiered four days later, December 25. Ultimately, Mary Jane was a hit that ran for 151 performances. The Moscow Art Theatre performed at the Imperial in May 1924. Another Oscar Hammerstein II score was featured in Rudolf Friml's operetta Rose-Marie, which opened that September and eventually staged over 500 performances. Rose-Marie grossed enough to fund a dedicated memorial theater for Oscar Hammerstein I, which subsequently became Hammerstein's Theatre. (Note: Hammerstein's Theatre, now Ed Sullivan Theater, opened on November 30, 1927.) The Shuberts proposed expanding the Imperial in 1925, incorporating it into the base of an 15-story residential building designed by Krapp, but this never occurred.

The Imperial's next production, the 1926 musical Sweetheart Time, was moderately successful. The same year, the Imperial staged Oh, Kay!, featuring Victor Moore and Gertrude Lawrence with music from George and Ira Gershwin. The Imperial then hosted Sigmund Romberg's operetta The New Moon in 1928, with a Hammerstein score; it was among Broadway's last hit operettas, as well as the only Broadway production in the 1928 season to have over 500 performances. The musical Sons o' Guns opened in November 1929 with Lili Damita; it ran 297 performances in spite of the onset of the Great Depression.

=== 1930s to 1950s ===
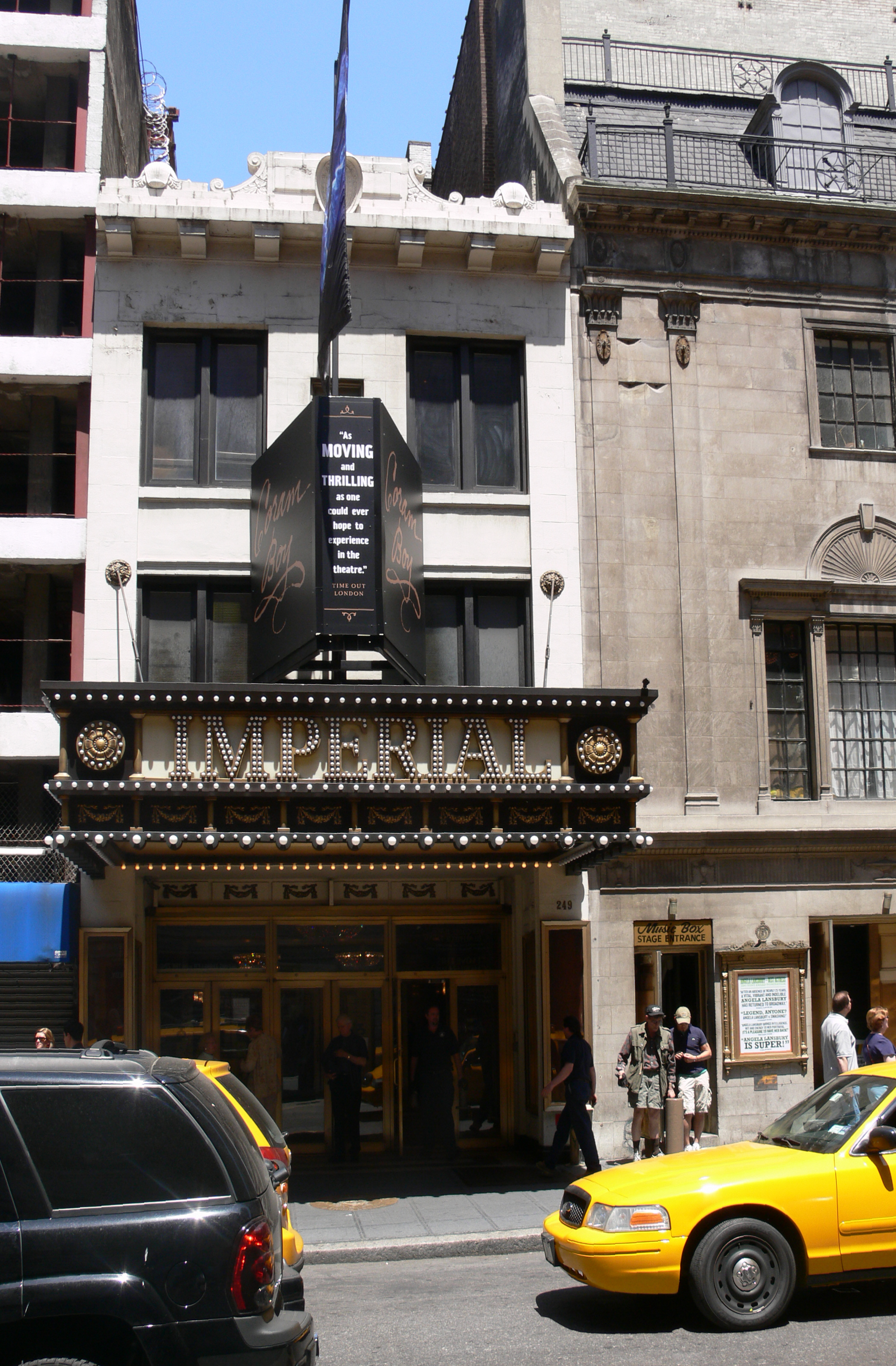
45th Street entrance

The 1930s began with some short runs, but the Imperial still hosted several successful shows despite the Shuberts' Depression-era financial troubles. Ed Wynn staged the vaudeville-style The Laugh Parade in 1931, while Howard Dietz and Arthur Schwartz had a successful score the next year in the musical Flying Colors. Two productions by George S. Kaufman and Morrie Ryskind were shown in 1933: Of Thee I Sing and Let 'Em Eat Cake. Meanwhile, the theater had gone into receivership in March 1933, though the receiver then deeded the theater to the Imperial Theatre Corporation. The Imperial hosted the musicals Say When in 1934 and Jubilee the next year, the latter of which ran 169 performances. These were succeeded in 1936 by the ballet-themed On Your Toes, as well as Leslie Howard's revival of Shakespeare's Hamlet, which flopped after 39 performances.

The Shuberts' operetta Frederika opened in 1937, as did Dietz and Schwartz's Between the Devil later the same year; both were coldly received. More successful were Cole Porter's Leave It to Me! in 1938, where Mary Martin made her Broadway debut, and Richard Rodgers and Lorenz Hart's collaboration for Too Many Girls in 1939. Alfred J. Callahan bought the Imperial in 1940 after the Imperial Theatre Corporation defaulted on a mortgage, and Callahan sold the theater the next year to the Dorsar Corporation. The Imperial consistently hosted popular musical productions during the 1940s. The first was Ryskind and Irving Berlin's Louisiana Purchase in 1940, which had 444 performances. Next was Herbert and Dorothy Fields's 1941 musical Let's Face It!, with a score by Porter, which ran for 547 performances. A transfer of the long-running Rosalinda from the 44th Street Theatre followed in 1943, and the Kurt Weill and Ogden Nash musical One Touch of Venus premiered the same year with Mary Martin. The Ziegfeld Follies of 1943 was also performed at the Imperial.

The late 1940s saw the premieres of multiple hits, a trend that continued through the 1950s. The largest of those was the musical Annie Get Your Gun, featuring Ethel Merman with a score by Berlin, which opened in 1946 and ran 1,147 performances. The run of Annie Get Your Gun was suspended temporarily in 1946 after the weight of the musical's set caused one of the theater's beams to warp. The Imperial then hosted two shows in 1949: a transfer of Along Fifth Avenue, as well as a 308-performance run of Berlin and Robert E. Sherwood's Miss Liberty. In 1950, the Imperial hosted Peter Pan, featuring Jean Arthur and Boris Karloff with a score by Leonard Bernstein. Later that year, Merman appeared in Berlin's Call Me Madam, which had 644 performances.

Wish You Were Here premiered in 1952, running 598 performances, with a set that included a fully functional swimming pool on the Imperial's stage. This was followed by John Murray Anderson's Almanac in 1953, one of Broadway's last large revues. The Imperial staged Silk Stockings in 1955, which was Cole Porter's last Broadway production. Next to be presented was the Frank Loesser musical The Most Happy Fella in 1956, with Robert Weede and Jo Sullivan. By then, the Shuberts owned the Imperial again, but they operated nearly half of all legitimate theaters in New York City at the time, prompting the U.S. federal government to file an antitrust suit against the firm. As part of a settlement made in February 1956, they chose to sell their St. James Theatre, since they would have otherwise been forced to lease the Imperial or the St. James. The Imperial also hosted the 1957 musical Jamaica, starring Lena Horne and Ricardo Montalbán with a score by Harold Arlen and E. Y. Harburg, and the 1959 musical Destry Rides Again, starring Dolores Gray and Andy Griffith with a score by Harold Rome and Leonard Gershe.

=== 1960s to 1980s ===
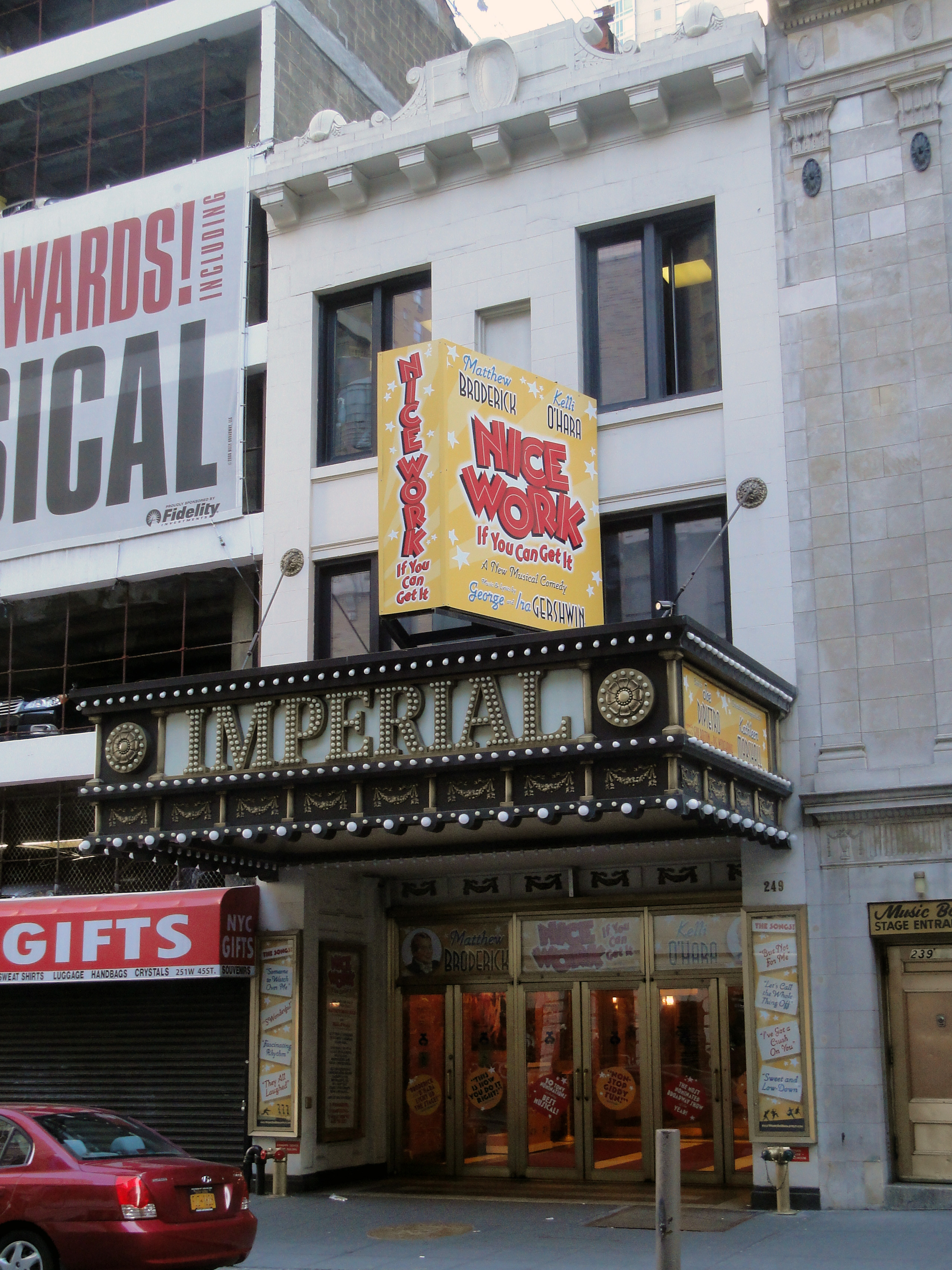
View of the exterior in 2012

The Imperial had more long runs in the 1960s. First among them was Gypsy with Merman, which transferred from the Broadway Theatre in 1960. Next was Carnival!, which opened in 1961 and starred Jerry Orbach and Anna Maria Alberghetti. Carnival! ended to make room for Lionel Bart's Oliver!, a West End musical that had its Broadway premiere at the Imperial in 1963. Oliver! ran for a year and a half, also transferring to make way for the next production: Fiddler on the Roof, which opened in 1964. Fiddler, which featured Zero Mostel with a score by Jerry Bock, Joseph Stein, and Sheldon Harnick, stayed for nearly three years before it transferred as well. This was followed in 1967 by Cabaret, which came from the Broadhurst Theatre and ran for a year and a half before transferring. John Kander and Fred Ebb next collaborated for the musical Zorba, which ran at the Imperial in 1968.

In 1970, the Imperial hosted the musical Minnie's Boys, featuring Shelley Winters, and Two By Two, starring Danny Kaye. Following these were the relatively short revivals of On the Town in 1971 and Lost in the Stars in 1972. By contrast, the musical Pippin opened in 1972 with a score by Stephen Schwartz, and it ran for over four years before transferring. During that time, the Imperial hosted the 27th Tony Awards in 1973. By the late 1970s, it was becoming more expensive to produce Broadway musicals, so the Imperial saw fewer musicals. The Imperial's productions in 1977 included Eugene O'Neill's play Anna Christie, featuring Liv Ullmann; Victor Borge's play Comedy with Music; and Neil Simon's play Chapter Two. With 857 performances, Chapter Two became the Imperial's longest-running non-musical production.

Most of the 1980s was dominated by a few musicals. Simon premiered They're Playing Our Song in December 1979; the production had 1,082 performances over two and a half years. The next production was Michael Bennett's musical Dreamgirls, starring Jennifer Holliday with music by Henry Krieger and Tom Eyen, which opened at the end of 1981. Dreamgirls ended up running for 1,522 performances over four years. During the run of Dreamgirls, the 1982 Tony Awards was hosted at the Imperial. The subsequent production was The Mystery of Edwin Drood, which opened in 1985 and ran for two years. The Imperial's final productions of the 1980s included a revival of Cabaret in 1987, Chess in 1988, and later 2025 and Jerome Robbins' Broadway in 1989. During the late 1980s, the Shuberts renovated the Imperial as part of a restoration program for their Broadway theaters, repainting the theater in a red, burgundy, and rose color scheme.

The New York City Landmarks Preservation Commission (LPC) had started to consider protecting the Imperial as a landmark in 1982, with discussions continuing over the next several years. Though both the exterior and interior were considered, the LPC designated only the interior as a landmark on November 17, 1987. This was part of the commission's wide-ranging effort in 1987 to grant landmark status to Broadway theaters. The New York City Board of Estimate ratified the designations in March 1988. The Shuberts, the Nederlanders, and Jujamcyn collectively sued the LPC in June 1988 to overturn the landmark designations of 22 theaters, including the Imperial, on the merit that the designations severely limited the extent to which the theaters could be modified. The lawsuit was escalated to the New York Supreme Court and the Supreme Court of the United States, but these designations were ultimately upheld in 1992.

=== 1990s to 2010s ===
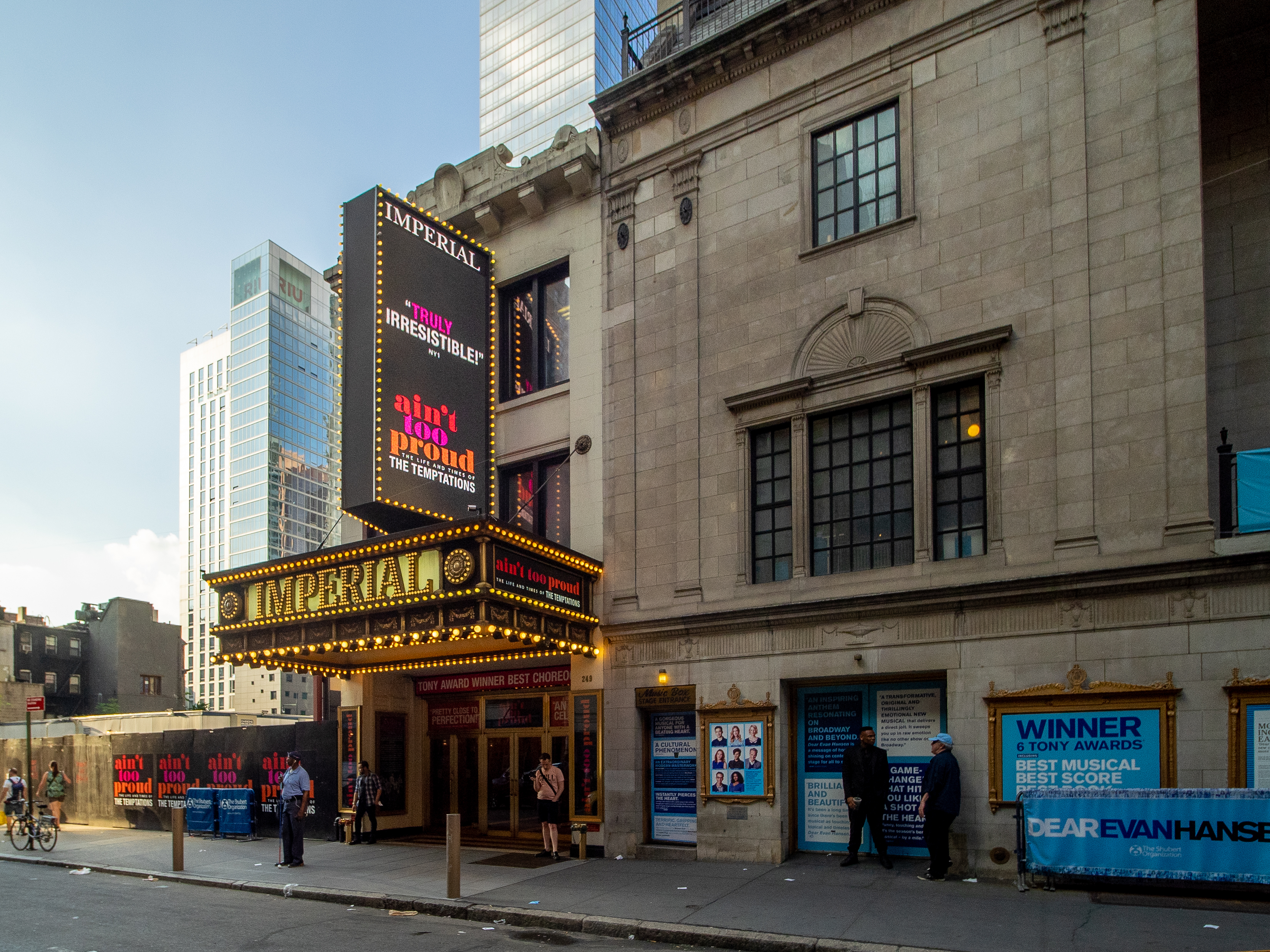
The 45th Street entrance as seen in 2019, when the theater hosted Ain't Too Proud

Jerome Robbins' Broadway closed in 1990. Les Misérables relocated to the Imperial in late 1990, playing there for the next decade. Les Misérables was the second-longest-running Broadway production ever when it closed in 2003; the closure was partially attributed to reductions in ticket sales caused by the September 11 attacks in 2001. The next production was The Boy from Oz, which opened in 2003 and ran for nearly one year. As part of a settlement with the United States Department of Justice in 2003, the Shuberts agreed to improve disabled access at their 16 landmarked Broadway theaters, including the Imperial. This was followed by a year-long run of Dirty Rotten Scoundrels in 2005; a short run of High Fidelity in 2006; and the productions of Coram Boy and August: Osage County in 2007.

Billy Elliot the Musical opened in November 2008 and ran for slightly over three years. It was followed by Nice Work If You Can Get It in 2012; 700 Sundays in 2013; a revival of Les Misérables in 2014; Natasha, Pierre & The Great Comet of 1812 in 2016; and Carousel in 2018. American Idol season 2 competitors Ruben Studdard and Clay Aiken performed at the Imperial for a Christmas special in 2018, and the musical Ain't Too Proud opened in March 2019. Ain't Too Proud achieved the box office record for the Imperial Theatre, grossing $1,865,016.90 over eight performances for the week ending December 29, 2019.

=== 2020s to present ===
The theater closed on March 12, 2020, due to the COVID-19 pandemic. In 2021, the Shuberts sold the air rights above the Imperial to Extell Development Company for $51 million, at the time a record high price for air rights in the area. The theater reopened on October 16, 2021, with performances of Ain't Too Proud, which ran until January 2022. The Imperial's next production, Andrew Lloyd Webber's musical Bad Cinderella, opened in March 2023 and closed that June. The musical Water for Elephants opened in March 2024 and closed that December after 301 performances. The same year, the Shubert Organization filed plans with the LPC to renovate the theater's marquee and renovate the interior.

Smash, the musical adaptation of the TV series of the same name, opened at the theater in April 2025, running for 84 performances. A revival of Chess opened at the Imperial Theatre in November 2025, Further details of the proposed renovation were announced in early 2026, which called for the addition of a 29,700-square-foot (2,760 m^{2}) annex; the annex was to occupy a long-vacant lot west of the theater. Chess closed in June 2026, and was followed by Billy Crystal's new solo show 860, which opened in October 2026 and is scheduled to play through February 2027.

== Notable productions ==
Productions are listed by the year of their first performance.

Notable productions at the theater
Opening year	Name	Refs.
1923	Mary Jane McKane	
1924	Rose-Marie	
1926	Oh, Kay!	
1927	The Desert Song	
1928	The New Moon	
1930	Princess Charming	
1930	Babes in Toyland	
1932	Flying Colors	
1933	Of Thee I Sing	
1933	Let 'Em Eat Cake	
1934	Say When	
1935	Panic	
1935	Jubilee	
1936	On Your Toes	
1936	Hamlet	
1937	Between the Devil	
1938	You Can't Take It with You	
1938	Leave It to Me!	
1939	Too Many Girls	
1940	Louisiana Purchase	
1941	Let's Face It!	
1943	One Touch of Venus	
1943	Ziegfeld Follies	
1944	Song of Norway	
1946	Annie Get Your Gun	
1949	Miss Liberty	
1950	Peter Pan	
1950	Call Me Madam	
1952	Wish You Were Here	
1953	John Murray Anderson's Almanac	
1954	By the Beautiful Sea	
1955	Silk Stockings	
1956	The Most Happy Fella	
1957	Jamaica	
1959	Destry Rides Again	
1960	Gypsy	
1961	Carnival!	
1963	Oliver!	
1964	Fiddler on the Roof	
1967	Cabaret	
1968	Zorba	
1969	A Patriot for Me	
1970	Minnie's Boys	
1970	Two by Two	
1971	On the Town	
1972	Lost in the Stars	
1972	Pippin	
1977	Mark Twain Tonight!	
1977	Anna Christie	
1977	Chapter Two	
1979	They're Playing Our Song	
1981	Dreamgirls	
1985	The Mystery of Edwin Drood	
1987	Cabaret	
1988	Chess	
1989	Jerome Robbins' Broadway	
1990	Les Misérables	
2003	The Boy from Oz	
2005	Dirty Rotten Scoundrels	
2006	High Fidelity	
2007	Coram Boy	
2007	August: Osage County	
2008	Billy Elliot the Musical	
2012	Nice Work If You Can Get It	
2013	700 Sundays	
2014	Les Misérables	
2016	Natasha, Pierre & The Great Comet of 1812	
2018	Carousel	
2018	Ruben & Clay's First Annual Christmas Carol Family Fun Pageant Spectacular Reunion Show	
2019	Ain't Too Proud	
2023	Bad Cinderella	
2024	Water for Elephants	
2025	Smash	
2025	Chess	
2026	860	

== See also ==
- List of Broadway theaters
- List of New York City Designated Landmarks in Manhattan from 14th to 59th Streets
