= 4th Wisconsin Infantry Regiment (1898) =

U.S. Volunteer infantry regiment

- Flag of Wisconsin
- Active: July 11, 1898 – February 28, 1899
- Country: United States
- Branch: Infantry
- Size: Regiment
- Engagements: Spanish–American War

Commanders
- Colonel: Horace M. Seaman

The 4th Wisconsin Infantry Regiment, reconstituted in 1898, was as an infantry regiment that served in the United States Army during the Spanish–American War. The regiment served out its term of service within the continental United States, and did not see action during the war.

== Service ==
The 4th Wisconsin Infantry was raised in response to the second call for volunteers, but before they mustered into service they were sent north to Oshkosh, Wisconsin, to prevent violence at a massive woodworker strike. On July 11, 1898, the regiment mustered into federal service at Camp Douglas, Wisconsin, with a strength of 46 officers and 1,265 enlisted men.

They remained in Wisconsin through the end of hostilities in August, but in September they were sent to Camp Shipp in Anniston, Alabama, for garrison duty.

The 4th Wisconsin Infantry returned to Wisconsin and was mustered out of service on February 28, 1899. At the time of mustering out, the unit consisted of 46 officers and 1,090 enlisted men.

== Casualties ==
The 4th Wisconsin Infantry suffered 16 enlisted men and 1 officer who died of disease. 86 additional men were discharged for disability, court martial, or other causes, and 6 men deserted.

== Commanders ==
- Colonel Horace M. Seaman

== Notable people ==
- Edward E. Burns, captain of Co. C, later became a Wisconsin state legislator.
- Frank Merrill Caldwell, lieutenant colonel, later served as a brigadier general in World War I.
- William O'Neil was captain of Co. K. He previously served as a private in the 20th Wisconsin Infantry Regiment during the Civil War. He had served as a Wisconsin state representative before the war, and after the war served as a Wisconsin state senator.

== See also ==
- 4th Wisconsin Infantry Regiment
