= William O'Neil (Wisconsin politician) =

American politician

William O'Neal
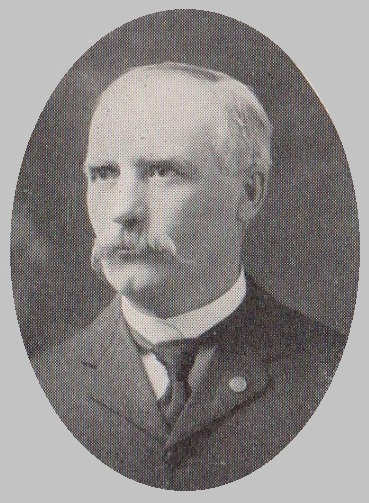

Member of the Wisconsin Senate from the 12th district
- In office January 7, 1901 – January 2, 1905
- Preceded by: Clarence A. Lamoreux
- Succeeded by: Albert W. Sanborn

Member of the Wisconsin State Assembly from the Bayfield–Burnett–Sawyer–Washburn district
- In office January 2, 1893 – January 4, 1897
- Preceded by: Lewis H. Mead
- Succeeded by: King G. Staples

Personal details
- Born: September 20, 1848 Scott, Columbia County, Wisconsin, U.S.
- Died: March 3, 1917 (aged 68) Cass Lake, Minnesota, U.S.
- Resting place: Oakwood Cemetery, Sharon, Wisconsin
- Party: Republican
- Spouse: Mary Judge (m. 1880; died 1914)
- Occupation: Merchant, politician

Military service
- Allegiance: United States
- Branch/service: United States Army; United States Volunteers; Union Army
- Years of service: 1861–1862 (USA); 1862–1865 (USV); 1898–1899 (USV)
- Rank: Captain, USV
- Unit: 13th Reg. U.S. Infantry; 20th Reg. Wis. Vol. Infantry; 4th Reg. Wis. Vol. Infantry
- Battles/wars: American Civil War; Spanish–American War

William O'Neil (September 20, 1848 – March 3, 1917) was an American merchant, temperance advocate, and Republican politician. He was a member of the Wisconsin State Senate (1901–1904) and State Assembly (1893–1896), representing the northwest corner of the state.

== Biography ==
O'Neil was born in the town of Scott, Columbia County, Wisconsin, on September 20, 1848. In the fall of 1861 he enlisted in the 13th U.S. Infantry, in which he served until March 1862, when he was discharged for disability. In June 1862, he enlisted in the 20th Wisconsin Volunteer Infantry Regiment, and served until the end of Civil War, participating in all engagements in which that regiment took part.

From 1865 to 1872 he traveled throughout the country, finally settling at Chippewa Falls, Wisconsin. In 1880 moved to Eau Claire, and in 1886 he moved to Washburn, where he operated a small store. In 1887 he was elected chairman of the town board and was re-elected multiple times.

In 1892 he was elected to the Wisconsin State Assembly, from the vast district of Bayfield, Burnett, Sawyer, and Washburn counties. He was re-elected in 1894.

After the outbreak of the Spanish–American War in 1898, O'Neil organized a company of volunteers for service in the war and was commissioned captain of Company K in the 4th Wisconsin Infantry Regiment. The 4th Wisconsin Infantry, however, never saw any combat in the war and spent just a few months on garrison duty in Alabama.

In 1900 he was elected to the State Senate, representing the 12th Senate district.

While serving in the Senate, he cast his vote to re-elect John Coit Spooner as United States senator. Spooner then assisted O'Neil in receiving an appointment as superintendent of the Leech Lake Indian Reservation, where he lived for the rest of his life. He died at his home in Cass Lake, Minnesota—inside the reservation—on March 3, 1917.

== Personal life and family ==
William O'Neil married Mary Judge of Sharon, Wisconsin, in 1880. They had no known children, she died in 1913.
