= Frank Merrill Caldwell =

US Army Brigadier General

Frank M. Caldwell
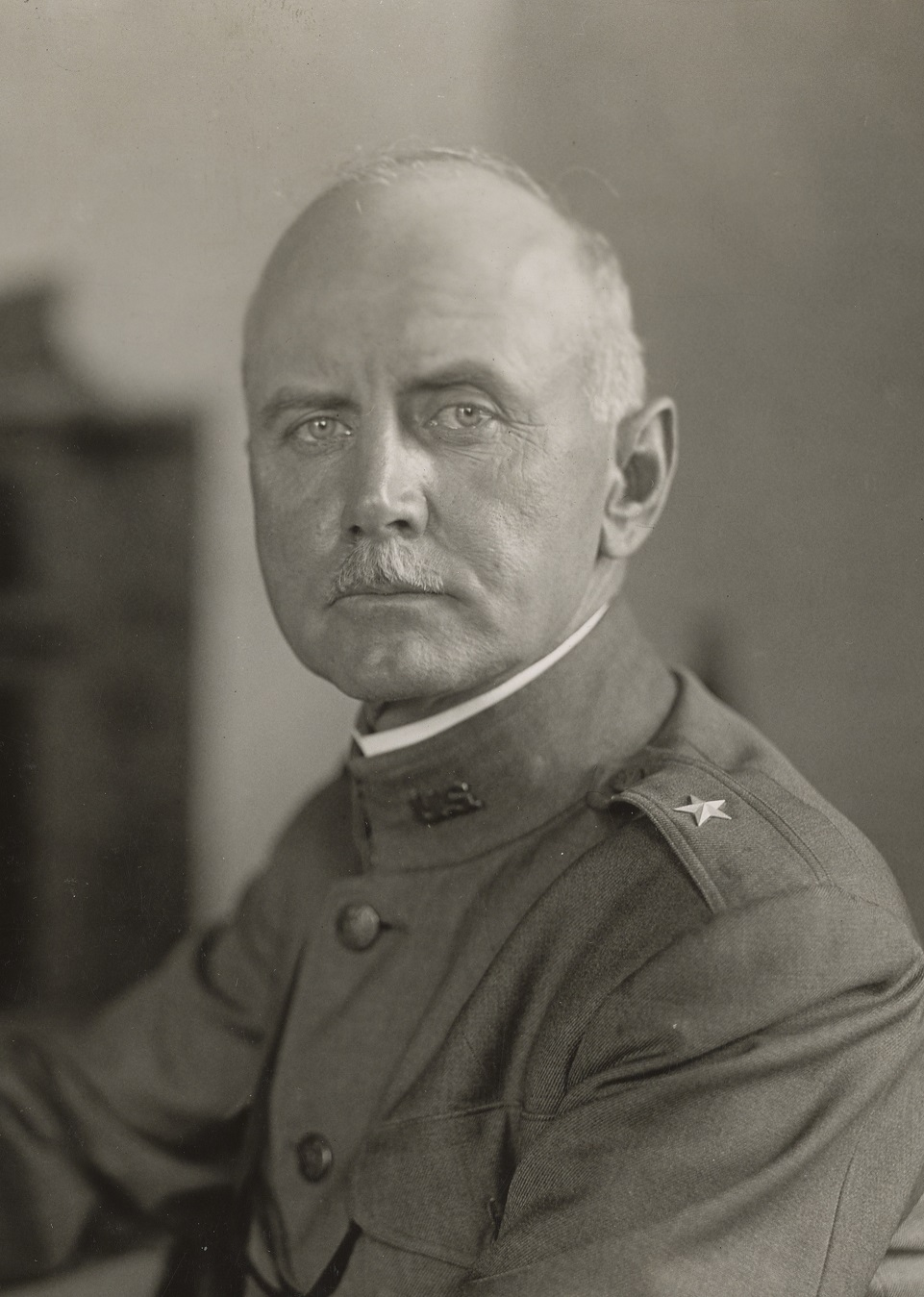
- Brigadier General Frank M. Caldwell in the Inspector General´s Office in May 1918.
- Born: November 8, 1866; Rochester, New York, U.S.
- Died: March 8, 1937 (aged 70); San Francisco, California, U.S.
- Burial place: Riverside Cemetery, Oshkosh, Wisconsin, U.S.
- Spouse: Mary Hay (m. 1894)
- Children: 3 (including Mary Hay)
- Relatives: Samuel M. Hay (father-in-law); Richard Barthelmess (son-in-law)
- Military career
- Allegiance: United States
- Branch: United States Army (Infantry Branch)
- Service years: 1890–1931
- Rank: Brigadier General, USA
- Service number: 0-293
- Unit: 4th Reg. Wis. Vol. Infantry
- Commands: 75th Bde., 38th Div. U.S. Infantry; 83rd Bde., 42nd Div. U.S. Infantry
- Conflicts: Spanish–American War; World War I

Frank Merrill Caldwell (November 8, 1866 – March 8, 1937) was a career United States Army officer who served as a brigadier general during World War I and earlier served as a lieutenant colonel in the Spanish–American War.

== Early life and family ==
Caldwell was born November 8, 1866, in Rochester, New York. He graduated 31st in a class of 54 from the United States Military Academy in 1890, and was commissioned in the Third Cavalry. His classmates at the USMA included Colden Ruggles, Fred W. Sladen, William J. Snow, Clint C. Hearn, Daniel W. Ketcham, Edgar Jadwin, Francis Marshall, Harry H. Bandholtz, Henry D. Todd Jr., William C. Davis, George G. Gatley, William S. McNair and Herbert Deakyne. All of these men would, like Merrill himself, attain the rank of general officer. He married Mary Hay on June 6, 1894. Mary was the only daughter of prominent Oshkosh banker Samuel M. Hay. Caldwell and his wife were the parents of three daughters, including the actress Mary Hay.

== Career ==
During the Spanish–American War, he served as lieutenant colonel of the 4th Wisconsin Infantry Regiment, but was removed from volunteer service in 1899. He graduated from the Army School of the Line in 1909 and from the Army Staff College in 1910. From 1916 to early 1918, he served in the Inspector General's Department.

On April 12, 1918, Caldwell was promoted to brigadier general. From May to October 1918, he commanded the 75th Infantry Brigade, 38th Infantry Division (AEF). This was followed by the command of the 83rd Infantry Brigade, 42nd Infantry Division, until 1919.

Caldwell returned to the Inspector General's Department again from 1920 to 1921. Following that, he was Chief of Staff of the Sixth Corps Area, serving this post from 1921 to 1924. During 1926 to 1927, Caldwell commanded the harbor defenses of the Philippines. His last command was the harbor defenses of the Pacific coast which lasted until November 30, 1931, which was when he retired.

== Death ==
Caldwell died at the age of seventy on March 8, 1937, in San Francisco, California.

== Bibliography ==
- Davis, Henry Blaine Jr. Generals in Khaki. Raleigh, NC: Pentland Press, 1998. ISBN 1571970886 OCLC 231779136
- Marquis Who's Who, Inc. Who Was Who in American History, the Military. Chicago: Marquis Who's Who, 1975. ISBN 0837932017 OCLC 657162692
