= Horace O. Crane =

19th-century American surgeon and politician

Member of the Wisconsin Senate from the 21st district
- In office January 7, 1861 – June 1861
- Preceded by: Ganem W. Washburn
- Succeeded by: Samuel M. Hay

Personal details
- Born: c.1808 Canfield, Ohio, U.S.
- Died: June 4, 1872 (aged 63–64) Green Bay, Wisconsin, U.S.
- Resting place: Woodlawn Cemetery, Green Bay, Wisconsin
- Party: Republican
- Spouses: Amelia Babcock (m. 1833; died 1843); Mary Ophelia Staples (m. 1850–1872)
- Children: with Amelia Babcock; Ralph O. Crane^{(b. 1835; died 1864)}; with Mary Staples; Elizabeth Crane^{(b. 1851; died 1922)}; Frederika Crane^{(b. 1854; died 1940)}
- Education: Western Reserve College
- Profession: Physician, Surgeon

Military service
- Allegiance: United States
- Branch/service: United States Army; Union Army
- Years of service: 1861–1862
- Rank: Surgeon
- Unit: 3rd Reg. Wis. Vol. Infantry
- Battles/wars: American Civil War

Horace Orlando Crane (c.1808 – June 4, 1872) was an American medical doctor and Republican politician. He served one year in the Wisconsin State Senate (1861), representing Winnebago County, and was field surgeon and later a medical examiner for the Union Army in the American Civil War.

== Biography ==
Crane earned his medical doctorate from Western Reserve College in 1848 and shortly thereafter moved to the new state of Wisconsin, establishing a practice at Green Bay. At some point prior to 1856, he relocated to Winnebago County, where he was a village trustee at Winnebago Rapids (now Neenah, Wisconsin). He was subsequently elected as Winnebago County's representative in the Wisconsin State Senate in the 1860 election. He served through the 1861 session of the Legislature, but then resigned to volunteer his services as a surgeon for the Union Army.

In June 1861, he was enrolled as first assistant surgeon in the 3rd Wisconsin Infantry Regiment. He proceeded with the regiment to Hagerstown, Maryland, in July. Shortly after the regiment's arrival, Dr. Crane was assigned to work as surgeon-in-charge at the field hospital established at St. John's College in Annapolis, Maryland. He served two years here, assisted by his daughter, who volunteered as a nurse. In May 1863, he resigned from his field duties and was appointed examining surgeon for the Union Army enrollment board in Wisconsin's Green Bay district. In this role, his duty was to perform medical examinations of volunteers and conscripts to determine if they were fit to serve.

After the war, Dr. Crane continued to practice medicine at Green Bay. He died at his home on June 2, 1872.

== Personal life and family ==
Horace Crane was a child of Belden Crane and his wife Asenath (née Chamberlain). The Cranes were descendants from Henry Crane, who settled in Wethersfield, Connecticut Colony, in the 1650s.

Horace Crane married twice. He married Amelia Babcock in 1833, and had one son with her before her death in 1843. He subsequently married Mary Ophelia Staples, in 1850, and had two daughters. His only known son, Ralph O. Crane, served with him in the 3rd Wisconsin Infantry and was later a Union army hospital steward and died of disease in 1864. Crane's daughter Frederika was a locally famous artist and helped found the Neville Public Museum near Green Bay.

Wisconsin Senate
| Preceded by Ganem W. Washburn | Member of the Wisconsin Senate from the 21st district January 7, 1861 – June 1861 | Succeeded by Samuel M. Hay |
