= The Still Alarm (1930 film) =

1930 film

The Still Alarm (1930) is a short film starring the comedians Fred Allen and Clifton Webb, and directed by Roy Mack. The film was based on a skit by George S. Kaufman and released by Warner Brothers as a Vitaphone film. This 10-minute film occupied one reel and still survives.
