= Town Topics (musical) =

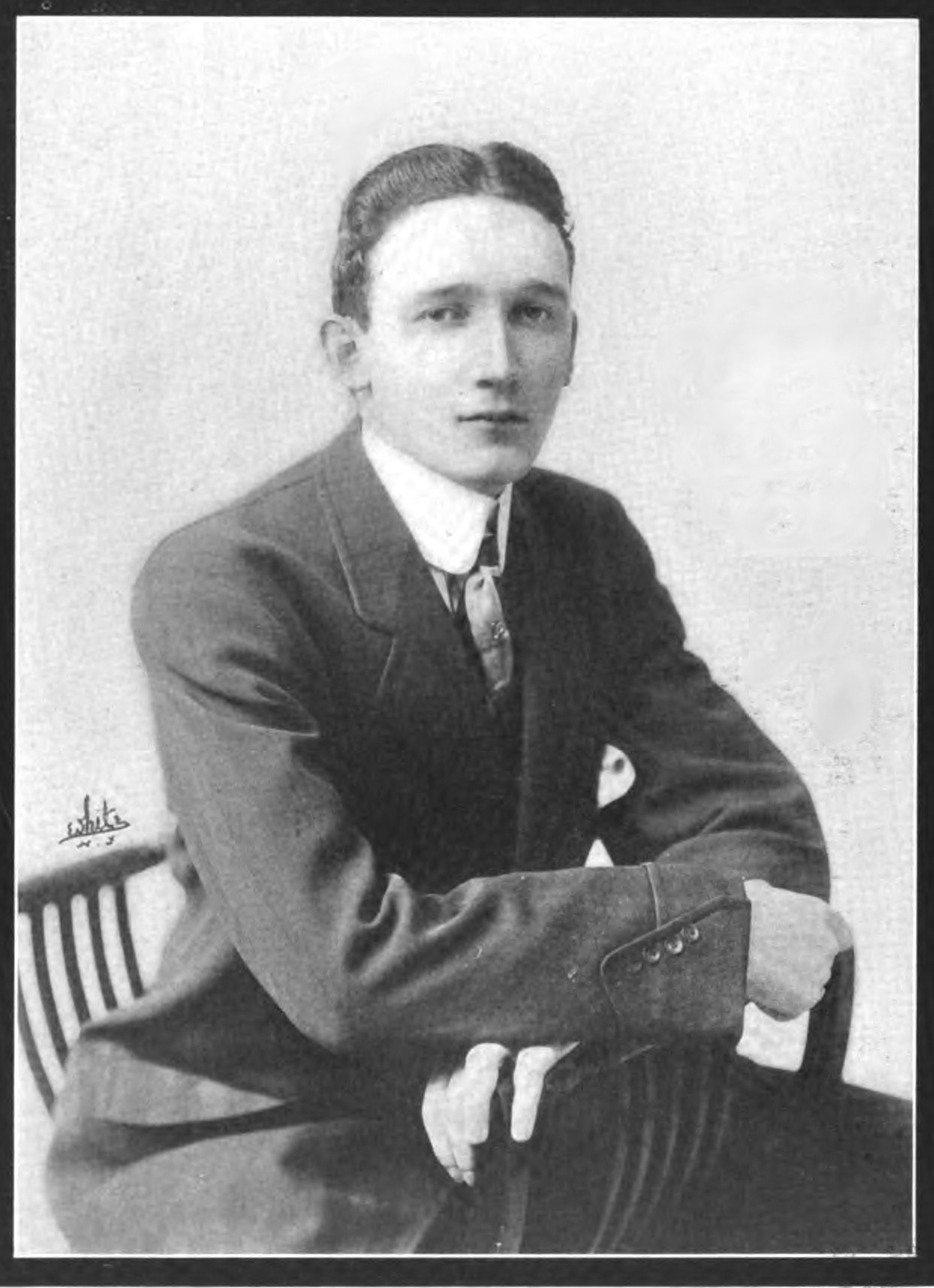
Thomas J. Gray in 1908

Ned Wayburn's Town Topics was a musical comedy revue that opened at the Century Theatre in New York City on September 23, 1915. The book was written Harry B. Smith, Thomas J. Gray, and Robert B. Smith, while the music was composed by Harold Orlob.

== Productions ==
The final performance during its original Broadway run was on 20 November 20, 1915. The Shuberts then took Wayburn's Town Topics to the New York Winter Garden and to the Colonial theater in Cleveland.
