= Mary Hay (actress) =

American actress

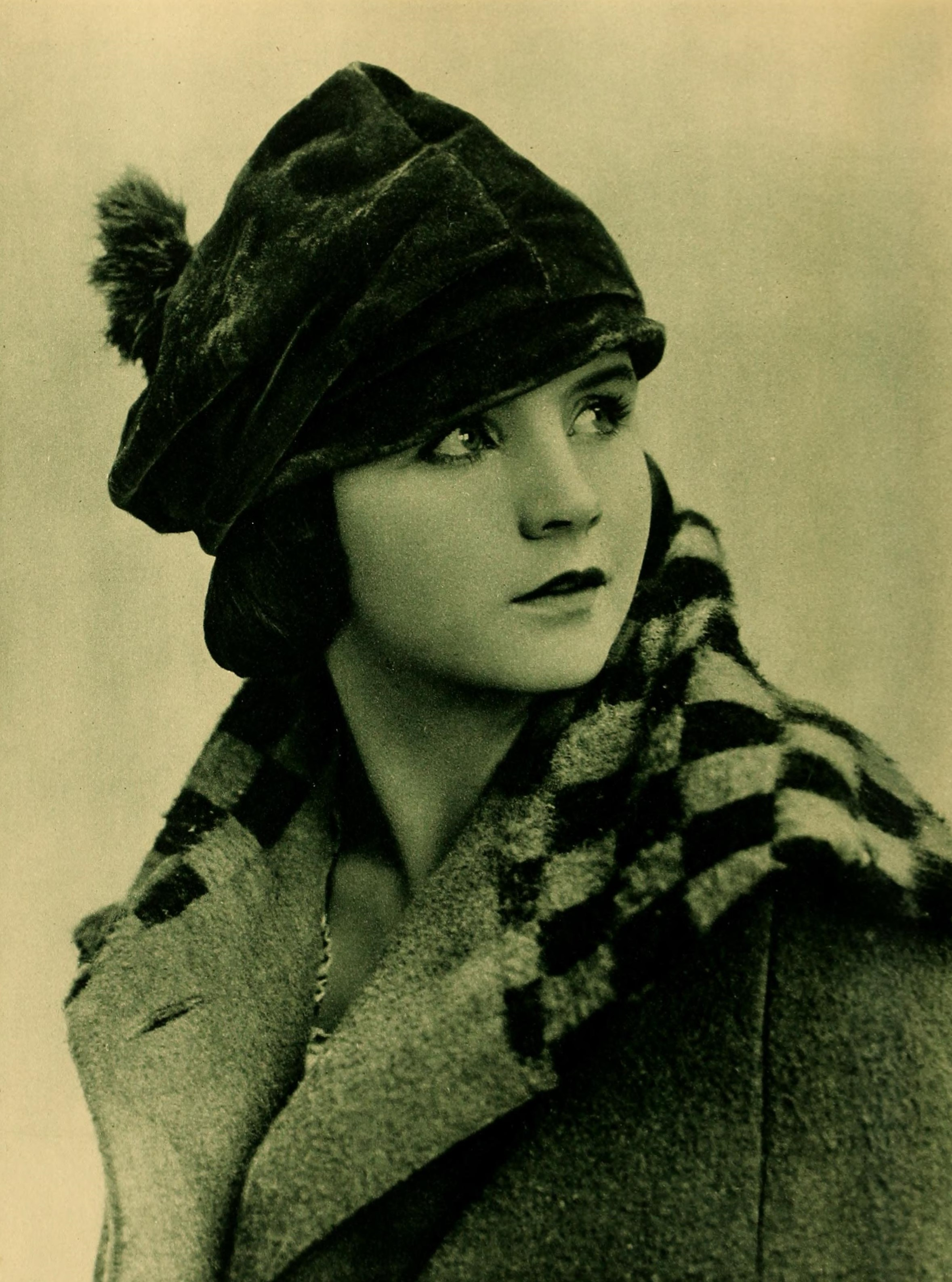
- Photoplay Magazine, 1920
- Born: Mary Hay Caldwell; August 22, 1901; Fort Bliss, Texas, U.S.
- Died: June 4, 1957 (aged 55); Inverness, California, U.S.
- Occupations: Dancer, stage and screen actress, playwright
- Spouses: Richard Barthelmess (m. 1920; div. 1927) Vivian Bath (m. 1927; div. 1934) Richard Hastings (m. 1939; div. 1952)
- Children: 3

Mary Hay Caldwell (August 22, 1901 – June 4, 1957) was an American dancer, musical comedy and silent screen actress, playwright, and former Ziegfeld girl.

== Life and career ==
Hay was born at Fort Bliss in Texas on August 22, 1901, the daughter of Frank Merrill Caldwell (1866–1937), a West Point graduate and noted career army officer, and Mary Hay (1865–1957), the daughter of an Oshkosh, Wisconsin, hardware merchant.

Hay was a graduate of the Anna Head School for Girls in Berkeley and had studied dance at Ruth St. Denis’ Denishawn studio in Los Angeles. During this period film directors would often recruit Denis’ students to fill minor dancing roles, a process that one day led to Hay being chosen by D. W. Griffith to play the little French dancer in the 1918 World War I film, Hearts of the World.

Taking Griffith's advice to get stage experience before entering film, the following year Hay traveled to New York where she was given the opportunity to play in a Ziegfeld Follies comedy skit opposite a talented trick performing dog. The dog was played by comedian Phil Dwyer. Realizing she had stage presence, Ziegfeld soon elevated Hay to dance in his Nine O’clock Frolic, Ziegfeld Follies of 1919, and Ziegfeld Girls of 1920 performances staged at the New Amsterdam Roof Theatre.

In 1920 Hay convinced D. W. Griffith that she was ready to assume the role of the 'squire's niece' after the untimely death of actress Clarine Seymour during the filming of his adaptation of the Parker - Grismer pastoral play, Way Down East. Hay had known actor Richard Barthelmess, who starred in the film opposite Lillian Gish, since she had worked on Hearts of the World. Their engagement and subsequent wedding on June 18, 1920, at Manhattan's Church of the Heavenly Rest was widely covered by the press and entertainment tabloids of the day.

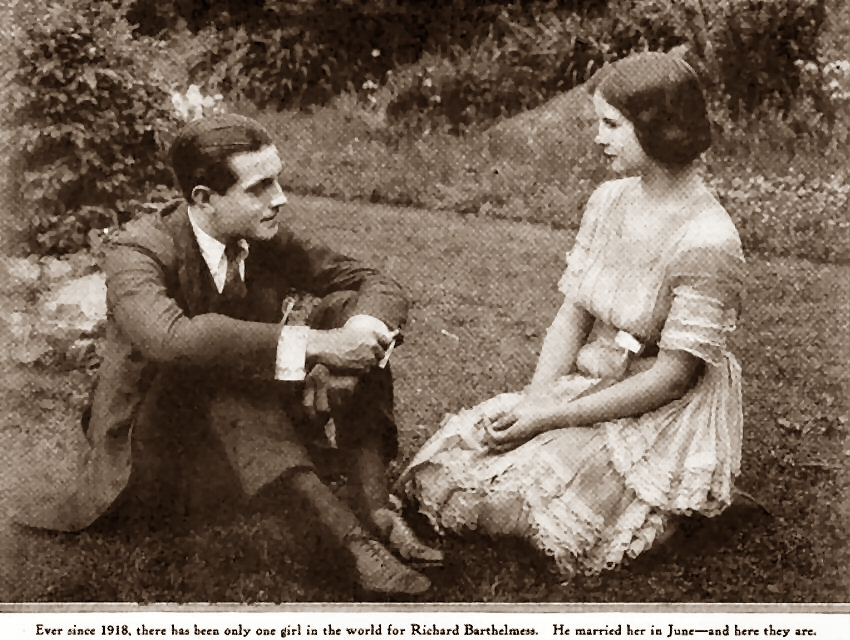
Photograph of Richard Barthelmess and Mary Hay published in Photoplay, 1920

That December Hay supported Marilyn Miller and Leon Errol playing Rosalind Rafferty in the extremely successful Sally, a Ziegfeld produced musical comedy written by Guy Bolton with lyrics from Clifford Grey and music by Jerome Kern and Victor Herbert. Hay played the supporting role ‘Miss Barbara Sternroyd’ in Marjolaine, a musical comedy by Catherine Chisholm Cushing that opened at the Broadhurst Theatre on January 24, 1922. Marjolaine, based on the comedy Pomander Walk by Louis N. Parker, soon came under fire from Dr. John Roach Straton for contributing to the wrecking of female virtue in America. In an open letter printed in The New York Times, the play's producer, Russell Janney, defended the piece and all involved in its production and invited the clergy to a special afternoon performance of the play. Marjolaine closed in late May after a successful run of 136 performances.

On Christmas Day, 1923, Hay created the title role in Mary Jane McKane, a musical comedy by William Carey Duncan and Oscar Hammerstein II. The play had a lucrative run at the Imperial Theatre that extended into May 1924. The following September she played ’Weenie Winters’ in the phenomenally successful musical comedy Sunny by Oscar Hammerstein II and Otto Harbach. Sunny opened at the New Amsterdam on September 22, 1925, and closed there after 517 performances on December 11, 1926.

Hay's next appearance on Broadway came at the Alvin Theatre as ‘Polly Tees’ in Treasure Girl, a moderately successful musical comedy by Fred Thompson and Vincent Lawrence with music and lyrics by Ira Gershwin and George Gershwin. Treasure Girl closed at the Alvin on January 5, 1929, after 68 performances. Under the pseudonyms Bruce Spaulding and Anthony Baird, Hay and Nella Stewart wrote the farce She's No Lady that opened in Chicago on March 2, 1930, to positive reviews. Her last Broadway play was Greater Love, which she co-wrote and played in. Greater Love ended its run at the Liberty Theatre on March 19, 1931 after 8 performances.

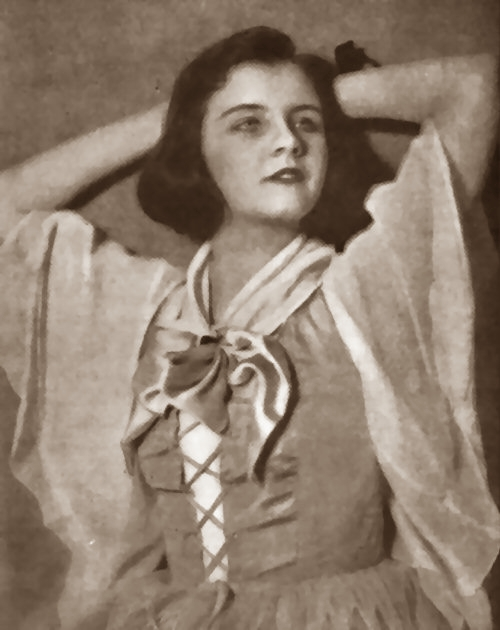
Mary Hay Photoplay, 1920

Hay's Hollywood career consists of only two other known films, Eastward Ho! in 1919 and New Toys released in 1925. In the latter she played ‘Mary Lane’ In support of her husband's character, ‘Will Webb’. By May 1925, Hay had separated from Barthelmess with an arrangement to share custody of their young daughter, Mary Hay Barthelmess. During this time she formed a dancing act with Clifton Webb ('Tom Lawrence' in New Toys) performing at supper clubs in Europe and later America.

Her marriage ended in mid January 1927, a few weeks after a Paris court had granted a divorce decree, and several months after Hay had traveled to France for solely that purpose. On April 9, 1927 at Greenwich, Connecticut, Hay married Vivian Bath, a wealthy British rubber merchant from Singapore, where the two planned to live. This marriage ended in 1934 at San Francisco, some six years after the birth of their daughter Anne.

Hay remained in San Francisco where she became active in little theater productions and, in 1939, married artist Richard Hastings, a grandson of Serranus Clinton Hastings. Hay's third daughter, Joyce Hastings, was born the following year in Georgia, not far from their second home in Carrabelle, Florida.

== Later years and death ==
Hay divorced again around 1952, about the time she began to suffer from heart disease. She died at her home in Inverness, California, with her young daughter at her bedside, on June 4, 1957. Nearly four weeks later Hay's mother died in San Francisco.
