= Governor Dyer =

Governor Dyer may refer to:

- Elisha Dyer (1811–1890), 25th Governor of Rhode Island
- Elisha Dyer Jr. (1839–1906), 45th Governor of Rhode Island
- George Leland Dyer (1849–1914), 6th Naval Governor of Guam
