= Susan Hart Dyer =

American composer, educator and poet (1880–1922)

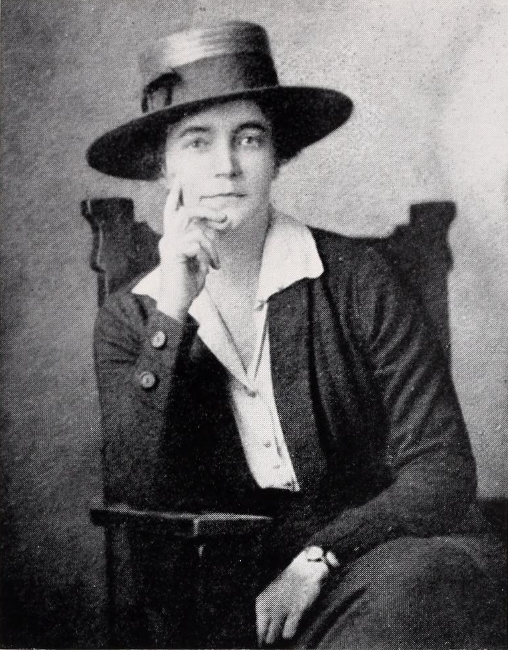
- Susan Hart Dyer in 1920
- Born: December 20, 1880; Annapolis
- Died: October 21, 1922; New York City
- Occupations: Composer, university teacher, violinist, poet, music teacher

Susan "Daisy" Hart Dyer (December 20, 1880 – October 21, 1922) was an American composer, musician, poet, and music educator. Her best known work is the "Florida Night Song", the second movement from her An Outlandish Suite for violin and piano.

== Life and career ==
Susan Dyer was born on December 20, 1880 in Annapolis, Maryland, the daughter of US Navy Commodore George Leland Dyer and suffragist Susan Hart Palmer Dyer. Her schooling was frequently interrupted for trips abroad accompanying her parents to George Dyer's various naval, diplomatic, and political posts. She kept a diary of her time in Madrid in 1897-1898 when her father was posted there as a naval attaché. When her father was Governor of Guam from 1904 to 1905, she worked in Guam as a school teacher.

Dyer studied at the Corcoran School of Art in Washington, D.C., from 1893 to 1895 and at the Art Students League of New York in 1896. However, music would be the focus of the rest of her education. The next year she began studying at the Peabody Conservatory of Music in Baltimore, Maryland, under J. C. van Hulsteyn and Otis B. Bois. She graduated with a teaching certificate in violin in 1902.

From about 1904 to 1915, Dyer frequently wrote poetry and published in magazines like The American Magazine, The Anchorage, Everybody’s Magazine, The Lyric Year, McClure's, and Scribner’s. Her poem "Zamboanga" was anthologized and excerpted in Bartlett's Familiar Quotations.

In 1909, Dyer began her long association with Rollins College in Winter Park, Florida, which lasted (with two interruptions) until 1922. She began as an instructor of violin, then on her return in 1914 began to also teach harmony, music theory, and musical history. In 1916 she became Director of the Rollins College Conservatory of Music.

From 1911-1914, Dyer earned a Bachelor of Music at Yale University in New Haven, Connecticut, completing it in only three years. She studied under Horatio Parker and David Stanley Smith. She won Yale's 1914 Steinert Prize in Orchestral Composition for her Concert Overture in A Minor. In 1915 she returned to New Haven for a year to become the founding director of the Neighborhood House Settlement Music School (now the independent Neighborhood Music School).

Susan Dyer left Rollins College in March 1922 to become director of the Greenwich House Music School in New York City. Shortly after taking the position, she became ill and finally died of liver necrosis at Presbyterian Hospital on October 21, 1922.

== An Outlandish Suite ==
The program for the suite's premiere at Rollins noted that the work was inspired by Dyer's world travels and she drew on the music of indigenous peoples, her perceptions were colored by the paternalistic racism which was common at the time. "Under this title Susan Dyer grouped together some of the musical impressions and reactions of years of travel. Through all her voyages and varied sojourns as a naval officer's daughter, she kept her sharp ears open to whatever music was wafted her way; and this suite is her vivid response to the musical color and emotional temper of races black and red and white and yellow."

1. Ain't it a Sin to Steal on a Sunday? (Negro Song)
2. Florida Night Song (Chuck-Will's widow)
3. Chicken Dance (SeminoIe Indian Tune)
4. Panhandle Tune (Texas Cowboy Song)
5. Hula-Hula (Hawaiian Dance)

Violinist Jascha Heifetz performed the second movement, "Florida Night Song", at Carnegie Hall and recorded it for Decca Records. Georges Barrère included an orchestral version of An Outlandish Suite in a 1926 concert of his Little Symphony chamber orchestra at Henry Miller's Theatre in New York City.

== Legacy ==
The Dyer Memorial Music Building at Rollins College was named for her. Designed by Kiehnel and Elliott, it was dedicated in 1940. It was renamed the Faculty Club around the 1970s.
