= Louisiana Naval Militia =

The Louisiana Naval Militia (French: Milice navale de Louisiane; Spanish: Milicia Naval de Luisiana) is the currently unorganized naval militia of Louisiana, United States. It was organized as a naval military reserve force, serving as naval parallel to the Louisiana National Guard.

== History ==
By 1898, the Louisiana Naval Militia consisted of 500 men all recruited from New Orleans. During a yellow fever epidemic in 1905, the Louisiana Naval Militia was activated during a series of quarantines enacted across the region. In one incident, two ships from Mississippi, Grace and Tipsy, attempted to cross into Louisiana from a quarantine zone. The Louisiana Naval Militia boarded the ships and arrested the officers and crew. The naval militia remained stationed on the Mississippi River to guard against possible incursions by Mississippi state troops crossing into Louisiana waters in their attempts to quarantine their own state from Louisiana fishermen; the naval militia remained on active duty until the federal government took over control of managing the quarantine response.

In 1909, the Louisiana Naval Militia sailed USS Isla de Luzon on a training cruise. By 1913, the Louisiana Naval Militia consisted of two battalions of four divisions each, 461 members, and two ships: USS Stranger and USS Isla de Luzon. In 1916, sailors from the Louisiana Naval Militia practiced firing 3-inch and 12-inch guns.

== Personnel ==
Naval militias are partially regulated and equipped by the federal government, and membership requirements are set according to federal standards. Under 10 U.S. Code § 7854, in order to be eligible for access to "vessels, material, armament, equipment, and other facilities of the Navy and the Marine Corps available to the Navy Reserve and the Marine Corps Reserve", at least 95% of members of the naval militia must also be members of the United States Navy Reserve or the United States Marine Corps Reserve.

== Legal status ==
The naval militia is recognized as a component of the organized militia of the United States under 10 U.S. Code §7851. Therefore, its restart of operations depends on either executive action by the state governor or by act of the state legislature.

== See also ==
- Louisiana State Guard
