= Harris Laning =

American admiral

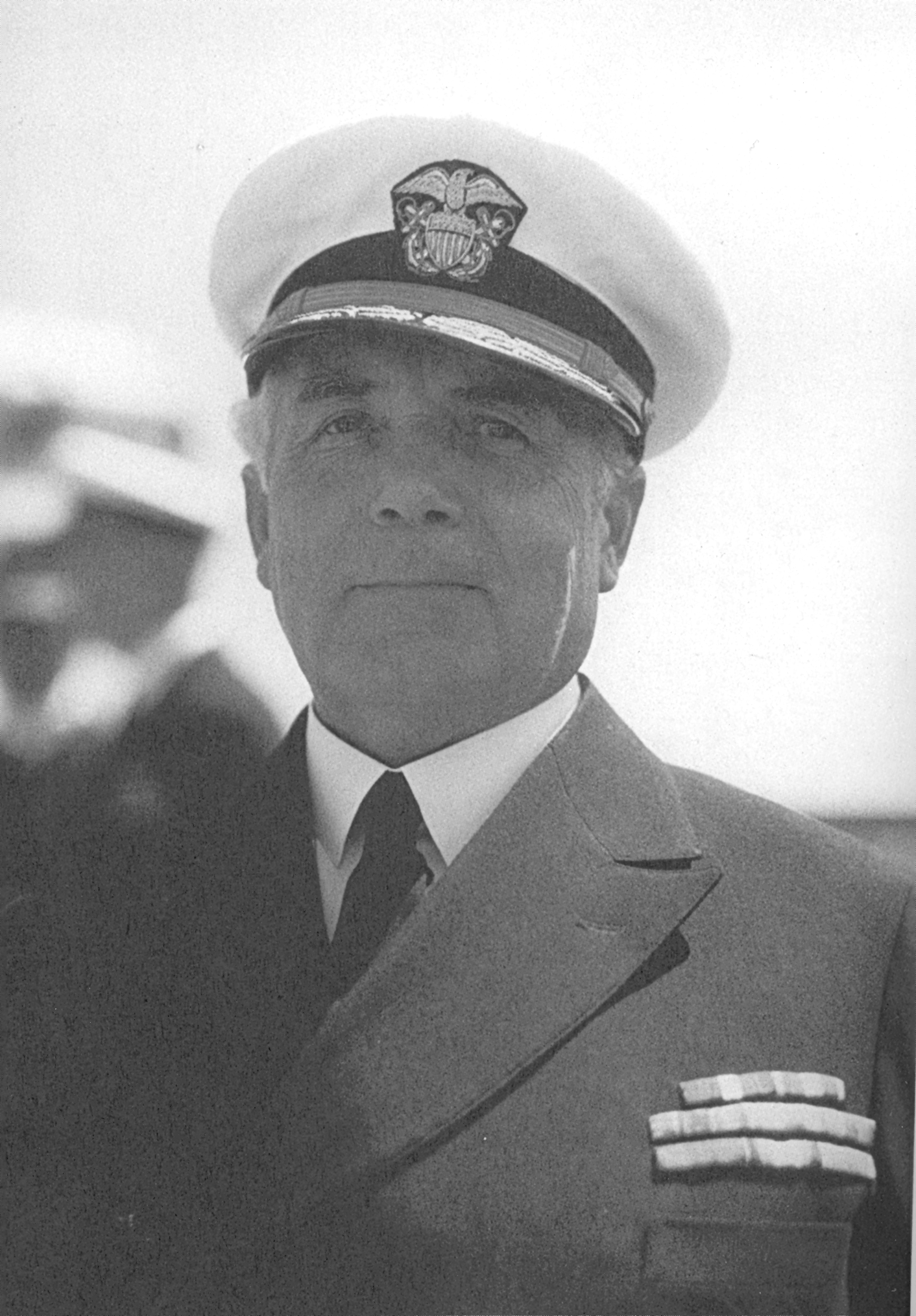
- Admiral Harris Laning
- Born: October 13, 1873; Petersburg, Illinois, U.S.
- Died: February 2, 1941 (aged 67)
- Military career
- Allegiance: United States of America
- Branch: United States Navy
- Service years: 1895–1937
- Rank: Admiral
- Commands: USS Cassin (DD-43); Battleship division President of the Naval War College; Cruisers, Scouting Force; Battle Force, United States Fleet; Commandent, New York Navy Yard; Commandant, 3rd Naval District
- Conflicts: Philippine–American War; Veracruz Campaign; World War I
- Awards: Navy Cross
- Other work: Governor, Naval Home

Harris Laning (October 18, 1873 – February 2, 1941) was a prominent officer in the United States Navy who eventually rose to the rank of Admiral. He was the uncle of Caleb Barrett Laning, who also achieved that rank.

== Naval career ==
Laning graduated from the United States Naval Academy on 7 June 1895. He served in the Philippine Islands during the Philippine insurrection. His first command was the destroyer USS Cassin, which operated off Veracruz during the 1914 Mexican Campaign. As Chief of Staff to Commander Destroyer Force, Atlantic Fleet in 1919 he supported the first successful transatlantic flight, made by Navy seaplane NC-4 in May.

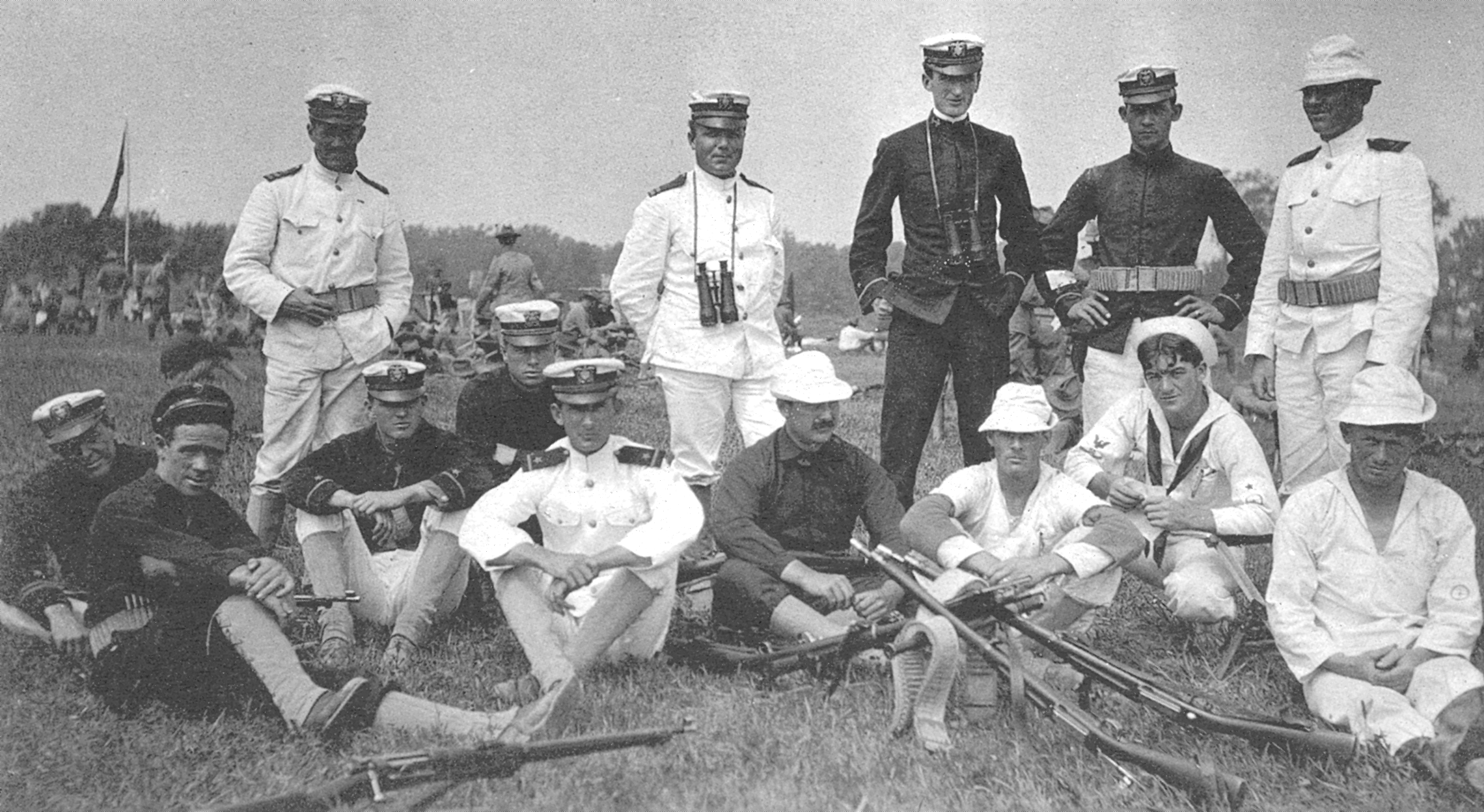
As captain of the Navy Rifle Team, 1907.

As a rear admiral, he commanded a battleship division, and he was President of the Naval War College from 1930 to 1933; as a vice admiral, he commanded Cruisers, Scouting Force. As an admiral, he commanded Battle Force, U.S. Fleet, from 1 April 1935 to 20 April 1936. He was Commandant, New York Navy Yard and 3rd Naval District from 20 April 1936 to 1 October 1937.

Laning retired from the Navy on 1 November 1937, then served as Governor of the Naval Home in Philadelphia, Pennsylvania, until his death on 2 February 1941. He was buried in the United States Naval Academy Cemetery.

The Naval War College published his memoirs in 1999.

Military offices
Preceded by Joel R. P. Pringle	President of the Naval War College; 1930-1933	Succeeded by Luke McNamee
