= Department of the Gulf =

US army command

Map of the military Department of the Gulf in 1864

The Department of the Gulf was a command of the United States Army in the nineteenth and early twentieth centuries and of the Confederate States Army during the Civil War.

== History ==
=== United States Army (Civil War) ===
==== Creation ====
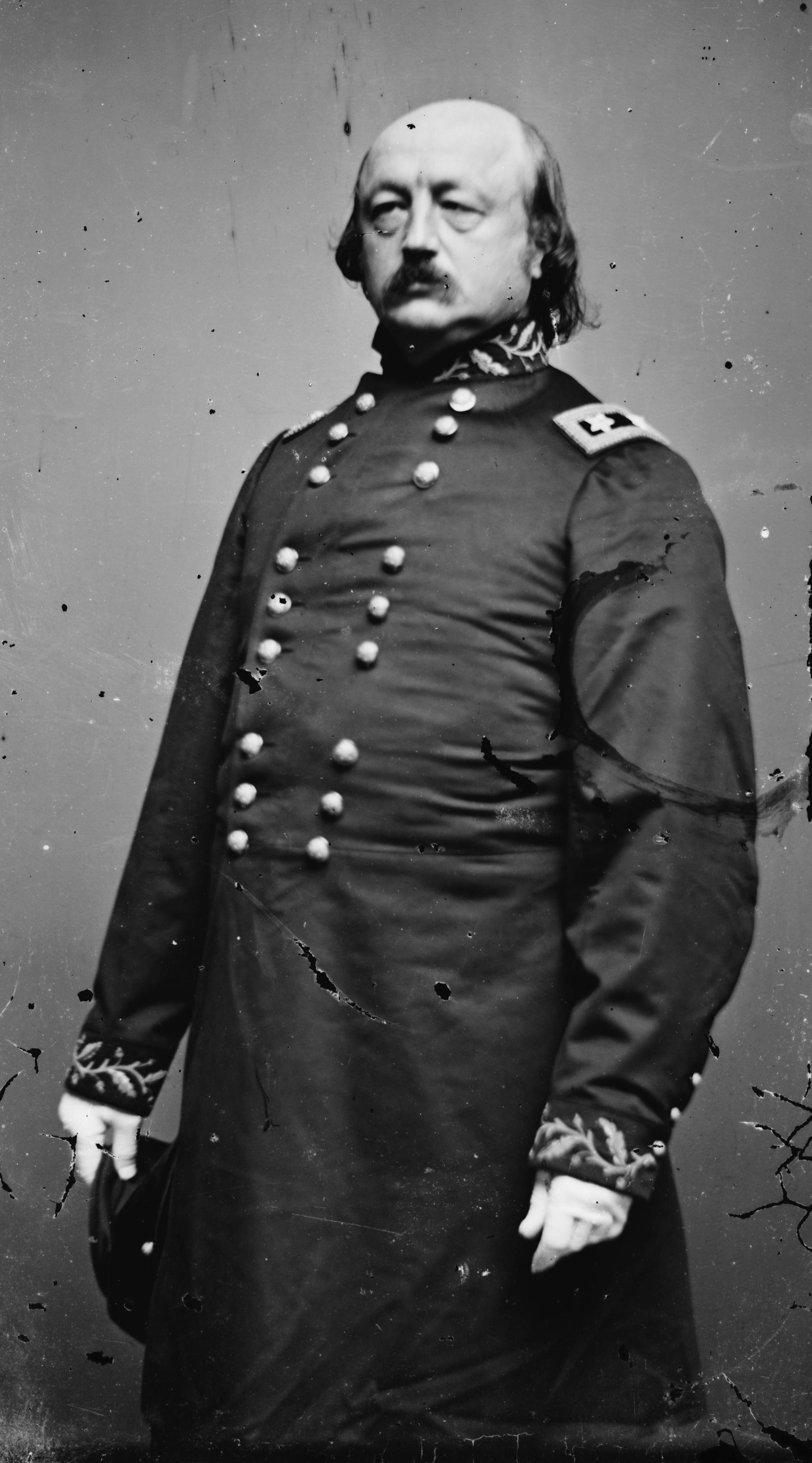
Major General Benjamin Franklin Butler

The department was constituted on February 23, 1862, when the United States War Department issued General Orders No. 20; the department consisted of "...all of the coast of the Gulf of Mexico west of Pensacola harbor, and so much of the Gulf States as may be occupied by the forces under Major General B.F. Butler." On March 20, 1862, Butler activated his command at Ship Island, Mississippi by issuing General Orders No. 1 (Department of the Gulf) assuming his new command.

==== Activities ====
United States Navy's West Gulf Blockading Squadron captured New Orleans, Louisiana on April 29, 1862, Butler moved his headquarters to New Orleans on 1 May. The department, sometimes referred to as the Army of the Gulf, became a union occupying force in the region.

==== Commanders ====
- Major General B. F. Butler, March 20, 1862 – December 17, 1862
- Major General N. P. Banks, December 17, 1862 – September 23, 1864
- Major General S. G. Hurlbut, September 23, 1864 – to April 22, 1865
- Major General N. P. Banks, 22 April 22, 1865 – June 3, 1865
- Major General E. R. S. Canby, June 3, 1865 –

=== Confederate States Army ===
==== Organization ====
The department, frequently referred to as the Gulf District, was established on July 2, 1862, as a part of Department No. 2; its area was defined as the coast from the Pearl River to the Apalachicola River northward to latitude 32° north. On November 3, 1862, the northern boundary was extended to latitude 33° north. On July 25, 1863, the department/district was transferred to the Department of Mississippi and Eastern Louisiana. It remained in that department only until January 28, 1864, when it was transferred to the Department of Alabama and Eastern Mississippi. Upon being transferred, the department/district boundaries were redefined as beginning at the mouth of the Pearl River, running north to latitude 32° north, east to the Georgia State line and south to the Gulf of Mexico. On May 8, 1864, the boundary was again modified to define the eastern edge as being the intersection of latitude 32° north with a line running from the junction of the Coosa and Tallapoosa to point where the Choctawhatchee River entered Florida then following the Choctawhatchee to its mouth on the Gulf of Mexico. The department/district surrendered on May 4, 1865.

==== Commanders ====
- John H. Forney, July 2, 1862 – December 8, 1862
- William W. Mackall, December 8, 1862 – December 14, 1862
- Simon B. Buckner, December 14, 1862 – April 27, 1863
- Franklin Gardner, April 27, 1863 – May 1863
- Dabney H. Maury, May 1863 – July 26, 1864
- Franklin Gardner, July 26, 1864 – August 15, 1864
- Dabney H. Maury, August 15, 1864 – November 22, 1864
- Danville Leadbetter, November 22 – December 12, 1864
- Dabney H. Maury, December 12, 1864 – May 4, 1865 (surrendered)

=== United States Army (Spanish–American War era) ===
==== Creation ====
The department was constituted by General Order 7, Headquarters of the Army, Adjutant General's Office, dated March 11, 1898. The order specified that the department was to include the states of South Carolina, Georgia, Florida, Alabama, Mississippi, Louisiana and Texas. All of the named states had previously been included in the Department of the East except Texas which had been the sole state in the Department of Texas. The depart was redesignated as the Department of the South on March 12, 1898, and back to the Department of the Gulf on March 18, 1898. Brigadier General William M. Graham assumed command of the department on March 14, 1898. The department was headquartered in Atlanta, Georgia.

On October 25, 1899, the department was merged with the Department of the East. It was reestablished in December 1903.

==== Commanders ====
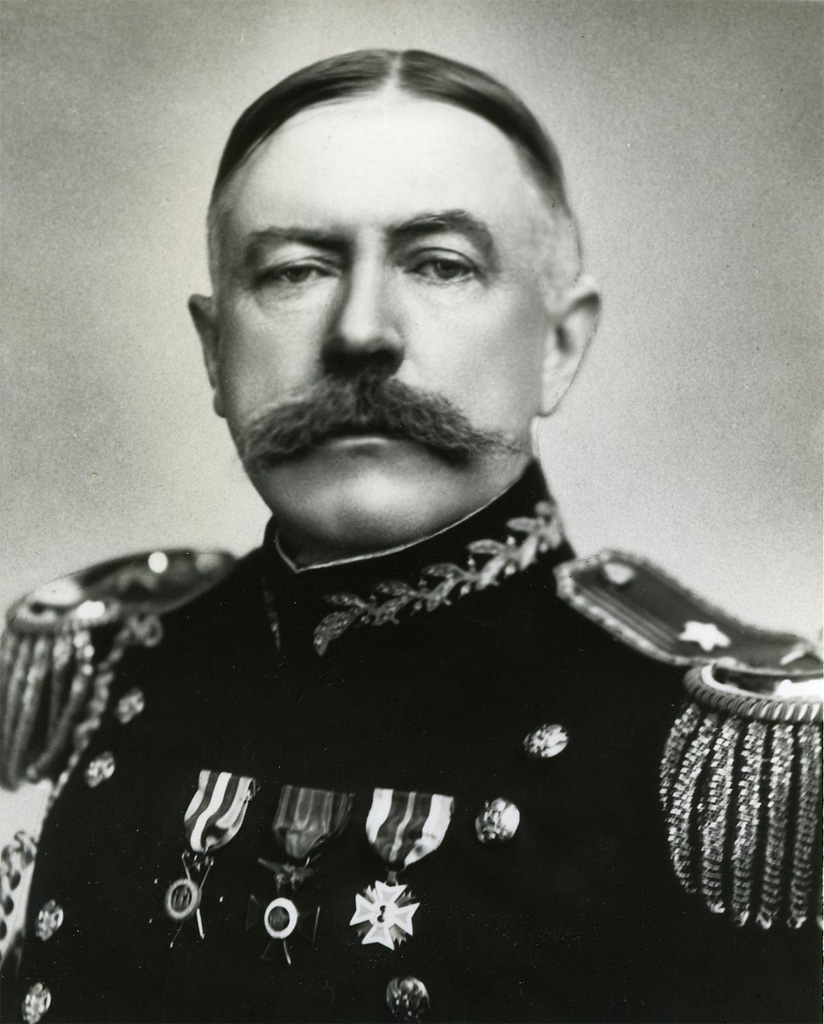
Brigadier General Robert Kennon "Fighting Bob" Evans.

- Brigadier General William M. Graham, March 14, 1898 – May 18, 1898
- Major General John R. Brooke, May 17, 1898 – July 4, 1898
- Brigadier General A. C. M. Pennington, July 4, 1898 – March 22, 1899
- Brigadier General Royal T. Frank, March 22, 1899 – October 18, 1899

...

- Brigadier General Thomas H. Barry, December 1903 – May 15, 1905
- Brigadier General James F. Wade, May 15, 1905 – April 6, 1906
- Brigadier General William P. Duvall, April 6, 1906 – February 18, 1907
- Brigadier General Winfield Scott Edgerly, March 3, 1907 – July 13, 1907
- Brigadier General John M. K. Davis, July 14, 1907 – January 31, 1908
- Brigadier General Ramsay D. Potts, July 1, 1908 – December 23, 1908
- Colonel George A. Dodd, 12th Cavalry Regiment, December 23, 1908 – January 16, 1909
- Brigadier General Ramsay D. Potts, January 16, 1909 – April 24, 1909
- Colonel John T. Van Orsdale, 17th Infantry Regiment, April 24, 1909 – May 28, 1909
- Brigadier General Albert L. Mills, May 28, 1909 – June 3, 1909
- Colonel John T. Van Orsdale, 17th Infantry Regiment, June 3, 1909 – June 27, 1909
- Brigadier General Albert L. Mills, June 27, 1909 – January 15, 1912
- Brigadier General William W. Wotherspoon, January 15, 1912 – August 17, 1912
- Brigadier General Robert K. Evans, August 17, 1912 – March 1914
