= Luke McNamee =

United States Navy Admiral, businessman

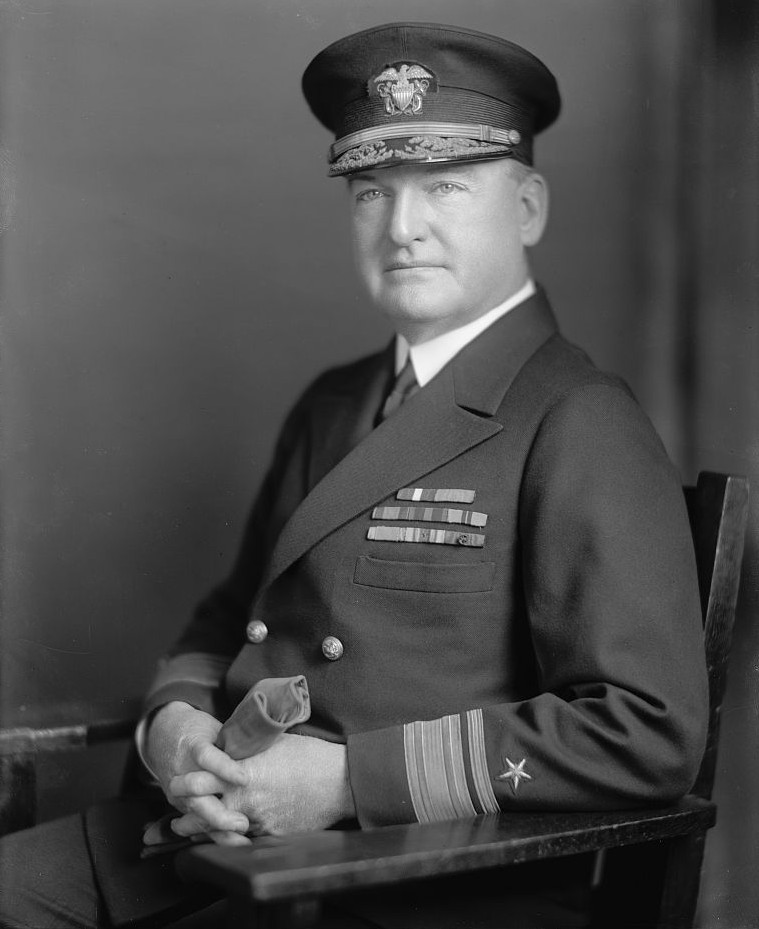

21st President of the Naval War College
- In office June 3, 1933 – May 29, 1934
- Preceded by: Harris Laning
- Succeeded by: Edward C. Kalbfus

21st Director of the Office of Naval Intelligence
- In office September 1921 – November 1923
- Preceded by: Andrew T. Long
- Succeeded by: Henry Hughes Hough

12th Naval Governor of Guam
- In office October 3, 1907 – December 28, 1907
- Preceded by: Templin Potts
- Succeeded by: Edward John Dorn

10th Naval Governor of Guam
- In office November 2, 1905 – December 3, 1906
- Preceded by: George Leland Dyer
- Succeeded by: Templin Potts

Personal details
- Born: August 4, 1871 Mount Hope, Wisconsin, U.S.
- Died: December 30, 1952 (aged 81) Newport, Rhode Island, U.S.
- Spouse: Dorothy Swinburne McNamee
- Relatives: William T. Swinburne (father-in-law)
- Awards: Navy Cross; Legion of Honour

Military service
- Allegiance: United States
- Branch/service: United States Navy
- Rank: Admiral
- Commands: USS Princeton (PG-13); USS Sacramento (PG-19); USS Nevada (BB-36); USS Tennessee (BB-43); Office of Naval Intelligence; Battle Fleet; Naval War College
- Battles/wars: Spanish–American War; World War I

Luke McNamee (April 4, 1871 – December 30, 1952) was a United States Navy Admiral, businessman, and the 10th and 12th Naval Governor of Guam. He served in the navy for 42 years, during which time he held multiple commands. During the Spanish–American War, he earned the Navy Cross, and later the Legion of Honour.

Earlier on his career, he served as governor, and expanded funding for fighting the infectious diseases running through the native population. He represented the U.S. Navy as a delegate to the Paris Peace Conference in 1919. He later became Director of the Office of Naval Intelligence. He was promoted to full admiral after being placed in charge of the Battle Fleet. After this command, he served as president of the Naval War College before retiring in 1934. After leaving the navy, he became president and chairman of the Mackay Radio and Telegraph Company, where he aggressively expanded telegraph and radio service overseas.

== Naval career ==
McNamee had a 42-year career in the United States Navy. He was appointed to the United States Naval Academy from Kansas, graduating in 1892. He was commissioned as an ensign on July 1, 1894. He served two years aboard the training ship USS Atlanta before being transferred to the USS Essex, where he served from 1894 to 1898. He became a lieutenant junior grade on March 3, 1899, and a lieutenant on July 1, 1900. He served as executive officer of the USS Princeton during the Spanish–American War.

In 1901, he served aboard the battleship USS Oregon. From 1905 to 1908, he was assigned to the Guam Naval Station, after which he served as the naval inspector to General Electric works (in Schenectady, New York and Massachusetts) and the navigator of the USS Nevada. After serving as the first commanding officer of the USS Sacramento, he was promoted to captain in 1917. While on the Sacramento, he commanded all Navy forces in the Gulf of Mexico, though this only consisted of seven gunboats.

After his promotion, he served as chief of staff to the commander of the United States Pacific Fleet, and then to Admiral William Sims, commander of United States Naval forces in Europe. In 1919, he was on the naval advisory board at the Paris Peace Conference.

In 1921, he served as commanding officer of the USS Nevada and the USS Tennessee in 1923. He served as director of the Office of Naval Intelligence. From 1924 to 1926, McNamee was appointed Naval attaché to the Court of St. James's in the United Kingdom. During his time in London, he was promoted to rear admiral. In 1926, he commanded all the Destroyers in the Battle Fleet, before becoming director of fleet training. for the next four years. After being promoted to vice admiral, he returned to the Battle Fleet to command its Battleship force, doing so from 1931 to 1932. In 1933, he achieved full admiral and commanded the entire Battle Force.

On June 3, 1933, he became president of the Naval War College. He left the post on May 29, 1934, after retiring from active duty. During his career, he was awarded the Navy Cross and the French Legion of Honour.

== Governorship ==
McNamee twice served as acting governor of Guam: first from November 2, 1905, to December 3, 1906, and again from October 3, 1907, to December 28, 1907.

As governor, he urged the United States Secretary of the Navy to invest in the control of leprosy and other infectious diseases on the island, arguing that this would be in the best interest of Navy finances, as it would protect paid personnel's productivity and the native Chamorro population, a group the navy thought could provide cheap labor.

== Business career and later life ==
After leaving the navy, McNamee became president of the Mackay Radio and Telegraph Company in 1934. He aggressively expanded the company by modernizing its overseas operations. He extended service on government and private vessels using the company's equipment as well. In 1940, he led negotiations with labor unions after they shut down company operations, and was able to reach an agreement.

On May 19, 1950, he became chairman of the board of directors. He also oversaw the opening of the first direct telegraph line to Bermuda. In May 1951, he resigned his position as director of both Mackay and International Telephone and Telegraph.

After retiring, McNamee lived in New York City. In 1948, he succeeded Herbert Livingston Satterlee as chairman of the executive committee of the Marine Museum of the City of New York.

== Awards ==
- Navy Cross
- French Legion of Honour

== Personal life ==
Luke McNamee was born to Michael and Anne Amelia (née Garvey) McNamee in Mount Hope, Wisconsin in 1871.

On October 22, 1903, at Saint Cecilia's Church in Boston, Massachusetts, McNamee married Dorothy Swinburne (born 1880, Erie County, Pennsylvania), the daughter of Admiral William T. Swinburne. The McNamees had no children.

For much of his life, he lived in Wisconsin, though he later moved to Jamestown, Rhode Island. He spent the last two years of his life as a patient of the Naval Station Newport Hospital in Newport, Rhode Island.

On December 30, 1952, McNamee died at Naval Station Newport Hospital at Newport, Rhode Island. McNamee is interred at Arlington National Cemetery in Arlington, Virginia. His widow, Dorothy, died on November 21, 1965 (aged 85) and was interred beside her husband in Arlington National Cemetery.

Military offices
Preceded by Harris Laning	President of the Naval War College; 3 June 1933–29 May 1934	Succeeded by Edward C. Kalbfus
Preceded by George Leland Dyer	Naval Governor of Guam; 1905–1906	Succeeded by Templin Potts
Preceded by Templin Potts	Naval Governor of Guam; 1905–1906	Succeeded by Edward John Dorn
