= Leonard Dyer =

American inventor and patent attorney

Leonard H. Dyer
- Born: May 13, 1873; Washington, DC
- Died: December 11, 1955 (aged 82)
- Occupations: Inventor, patent attorney, and yachtsman

Leonard Huntress Dyer (May 13, 1873 – December 11, 1955) was an American inventor, patent attorney, and yachtsman from Washington, D.C.

Dyer filed for at least 30 U.S. patents on his own inventions from 1896 to 1934. The most remarkable of his inventions was a patented six-stroke engine using water injected as a 5th stroke for extra power and cooling, to be ejected on the final (sixth) exhaust stroke. It came up in 2008 with regards to the novelty and priority of the Crower six stroke engine.

== Personal life ==
Dyer was a member of somewhat high society, with a net worth of at least $500,000 in 1922. He owned the Yacht "Jack 'O Lantern," which was piloted to several victories by Abbot H. Brush.

Despite his high ties, there was trouble at home. In late 1922, a petition for divorce was filed by his wife, Josephine Dyer in Greenwich, Connecticut, citing intolerable cruelty, and infidelity with a young woman from Greenwich.

He was one of 4 brothers, George, Frank and Richard, all of whom had US Navy backgrounds. In 1904 George Dyer was appointed by President Theodore Roosevelt as governor of Guam.
