= Combat information center =

Room in a warship or aircraft that functions as a tactical center

Plan position indicator (PPI) display showing polar display and radar sweep. A real radar display would show hard terrain features and look recognizably map-like, and from the sea, match well with land features of local nautical charts matching and sending strong clean radar echos back to the ship at sea.

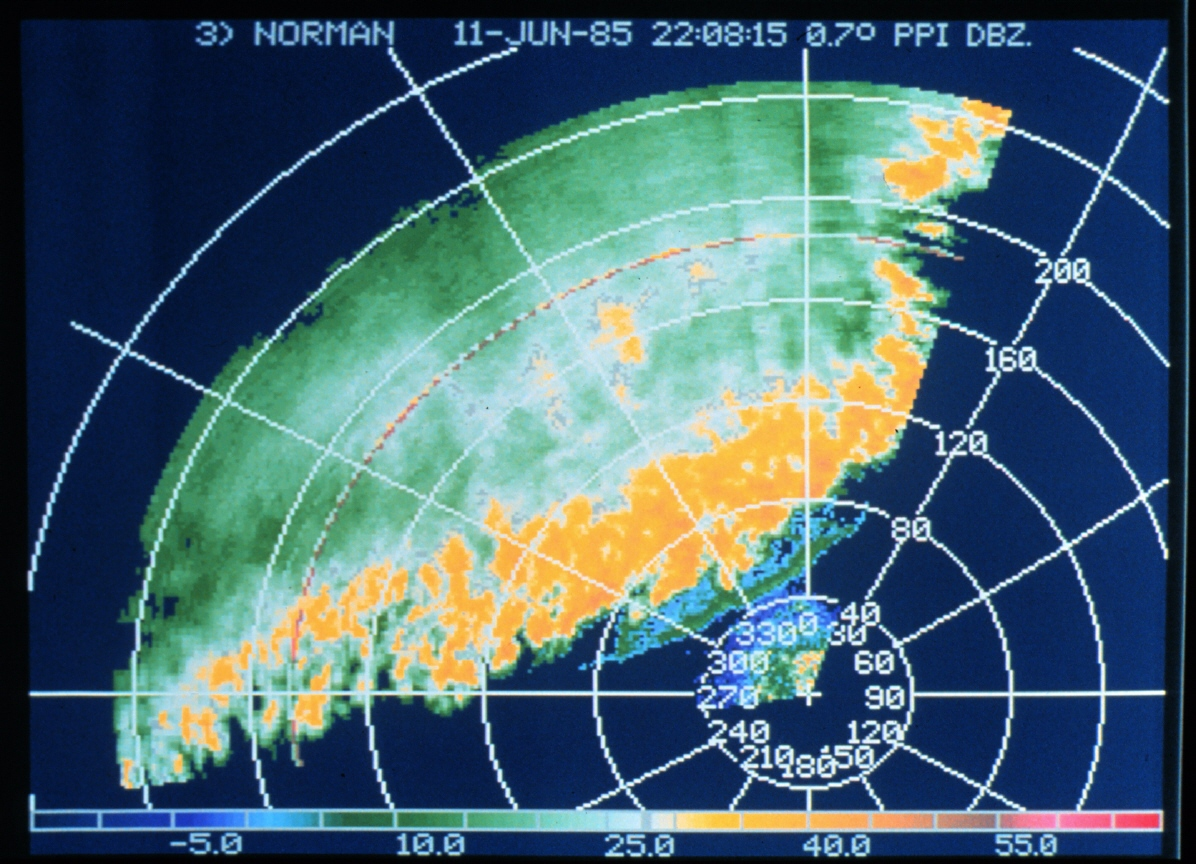
Plan position indicator (PPI) display showing Doppler radar weather data

A combat information center (CIC), action information centre (AIC) or operations room (ops room) in UK and Commonwealth Navies, is a room in a warship or AWACS aircraft that functions as a tactical center and provides processed information for command and control of the near battlespace or area of operations. Within other military commands, rooms serving similar functions are known as command centers.

Regardless of the vessel or command locus, each CIC organizes and processes information into a form more convenient and usable by the commander in authority. Each CIC funnels communications and data received over multiple channels, which is then organized, evaluated, weighted and arranged to provide ordered timely information flow to the battle command staff under the control of the CIC officer and his deputies.

== Overview ==
CICs are widely depicted in film and television treatments, frequently with large maps, numerous computer consoles and radar and sonar repeater displays or consoles, as well as the almost ubiquitous grease-pencil annotated polar plot on an edge-lighted transparent plotting board. At the time the CIC concept was born, the projected map-like polar display (PPI scopes) with the ship at the center was making its way into radar displays displacing the A-scope which was simply a time-delayed blip showing a range on the cathode-ray tube display of an oscilloscope.

Such polar plots are used routinely in navigation and military action management to display time-stamped range and bearing information to the CIC decision makers. A single 'mark' (range and bearing datum) bears little actionable decision-making information by itself. A succession of such data tells much more, including whether the contact is closing or opening in range, an idea of its speed and direction (these are calculable, even from bearings-only data, given sufficient observations and knowledge of tactics), the relation to other contacts and their ranges and behaviors. Harvesting such data sets from the polar plots and computers (Common to sonar, radar and lidar) allows the CIC crew to plot the data correctly on a chart or map at the correct range and bearing, and to calculate the course and speed of the contact accurately, giving the set a vast expansion to include future positions, given unchanged relative courses and relative speeds.

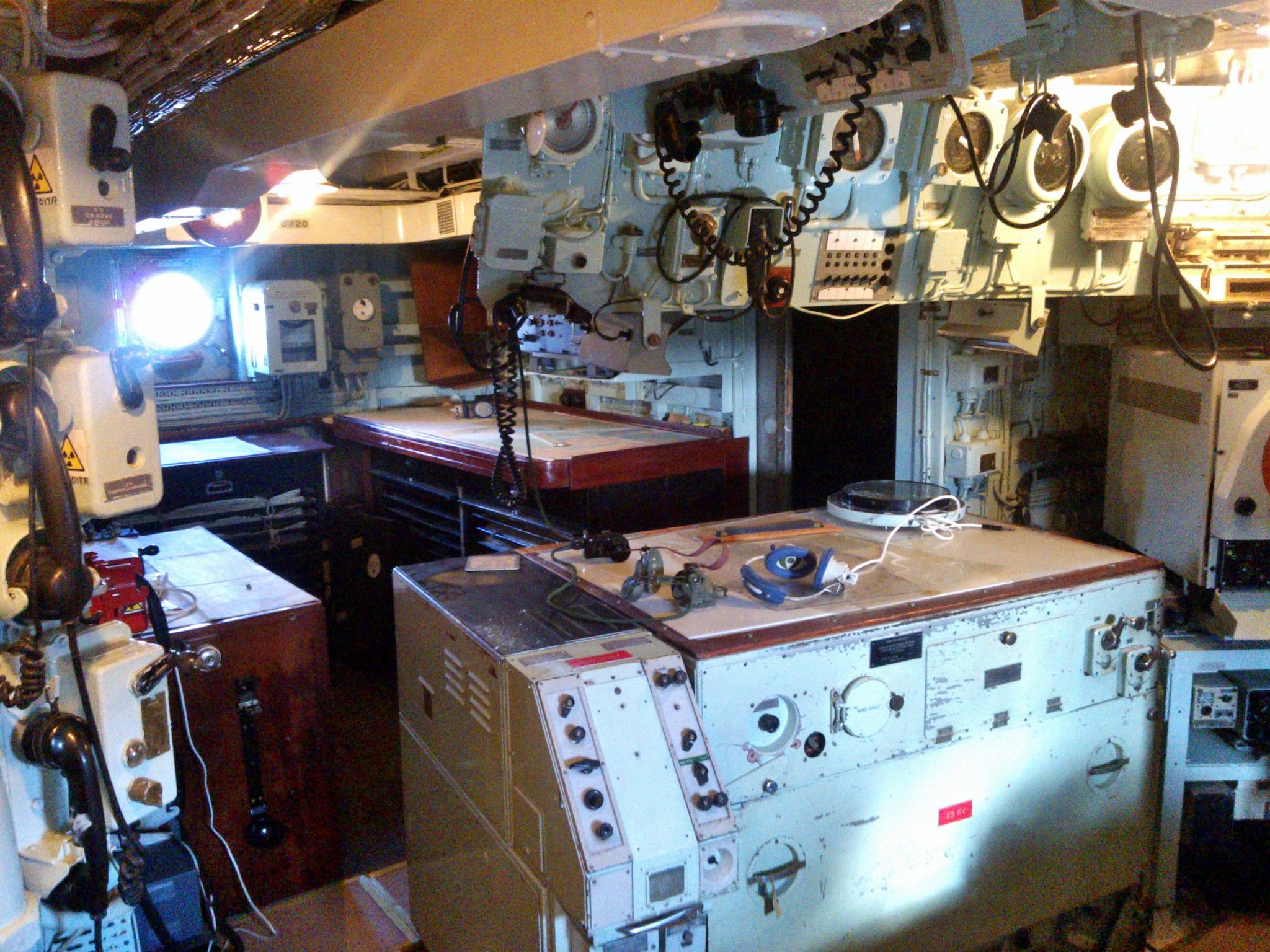
A 1960s operations room aboard the Royal Navy destroyer HMS Cavalier

A CIC in a naval context brings together and manages information on the warship's status and its surroundings, and supplies this to the commanding officer, who would generally be present on the nearby bridge or where plots can be viewed and, if one is aboard, a flag officer who might have their own separate flag bridge and fleet CIC. CICs or operations centers in other command contexts have the same function: information ordering, gathering, and presentation to the decision makers. The methods and materials may vary, but the provision of information and options to a leader remain the same.

Some control, assistance, and coordination functions may be delegated to the CIC staff or directly to the CIC officer, such as overseeing the mode and prioritization of sensor resources such as radar monitoring, targeting, or sonar activities; communications to external sources and assets.

On US aircraft carriers this area is called the combat direction center (CDC). The United States developed their Command Information Center concept circa the winter of 1942–1943 and implemented it in a surge of refitting and retraining during 1943 after post-battle action analyses of battles in 1942 from the battle of the Coral Sea through the losses at Ironbottom Sound during the protracted Solomon Islands campaign.

In British usage this area may be known as an aircraft direction room; together with the operations room they form an "operations headquarters". The British aircraft direction room evolved from the fighter direction office, a primitive means of controlling an aircraft carrier's aircraft through radio and radar. In September, 1942, HMS Victorious underwent a refit that included installation of an aircraft direction room.

== Development ==
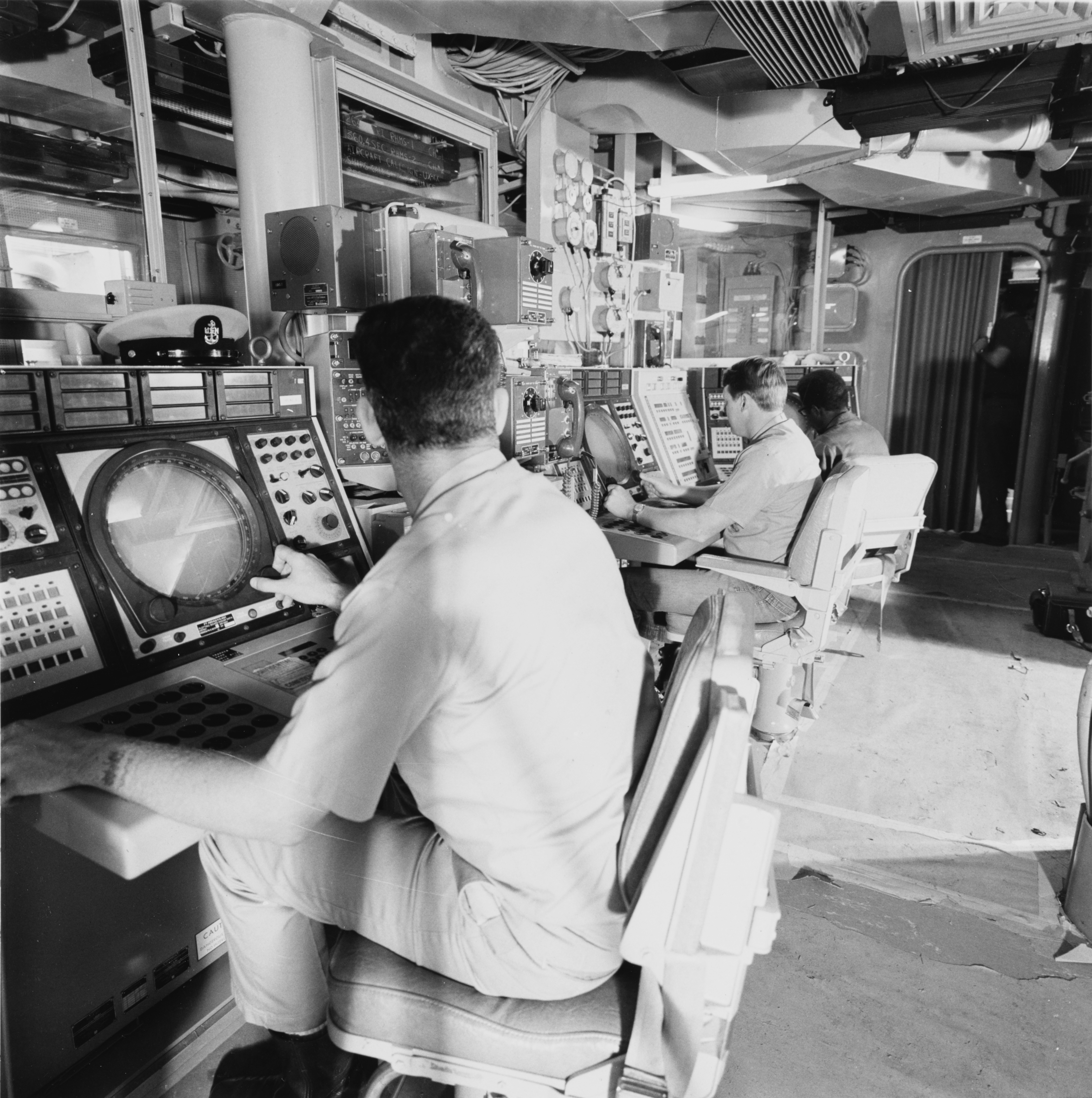
CIC of USS Spruance, 1975.

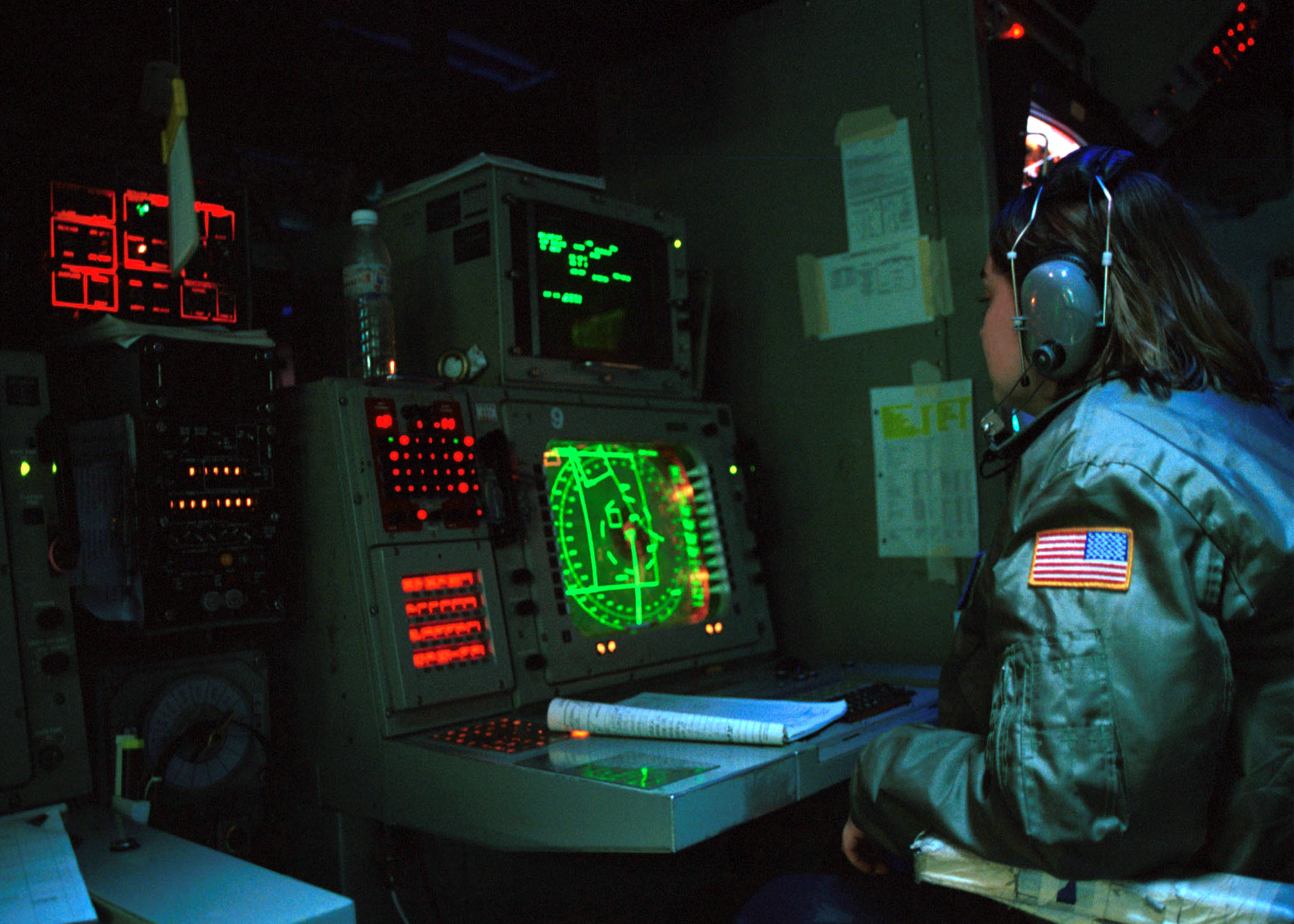
CIC of USS Carl Vinson, 2001.

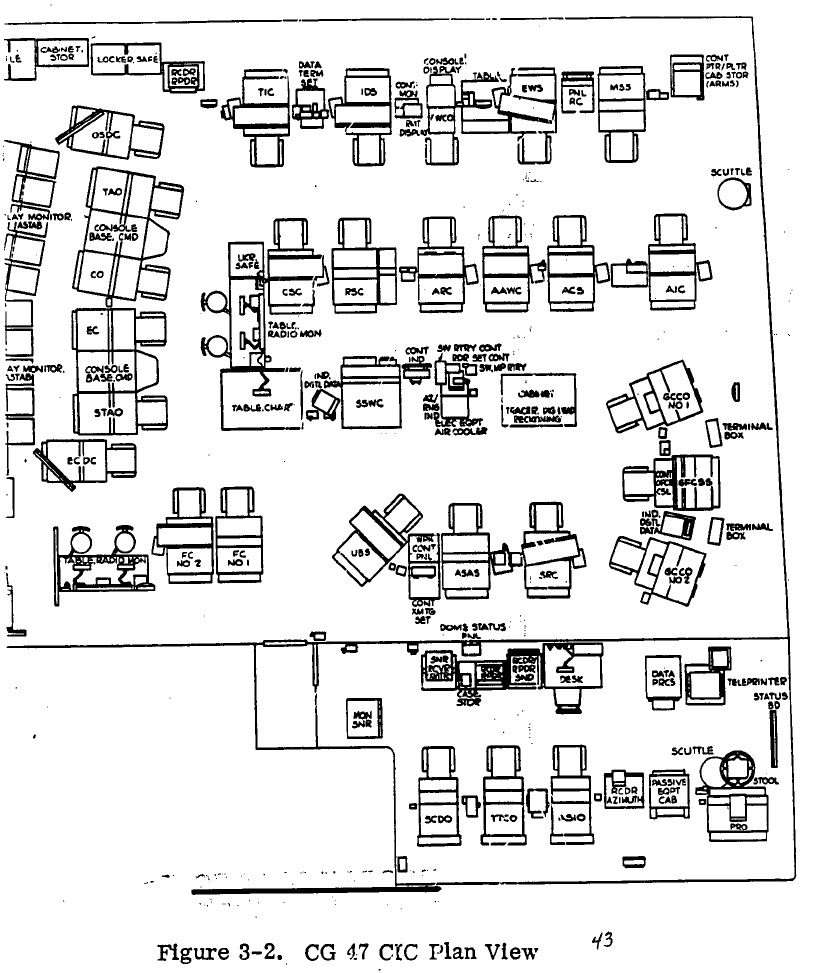
Layout of the Combat Information Center of early Aegis cruisers.

The idea of such a centralized control room can be found in science fiction as early as The Struggle for Empire (1900). Early versions were used in World War II; according to Rear Admiral Cal Laning, the idea for a command information center was taken “specifically, consciously, and directly” from the spaceship Directrix in the Lensman novels of E. E. Smith, Ph.D., and influenced by the works of his friend and collaborator Robert Heinlein, a retired American naval officer.

After the numerous losses during the various naval battles off Guadalcanal during the war of attrition in the Solomon Islands campaign and the Battle of Guadalcanal, the United States Navy employed operational analysis, determined many of their losses were due to procedure and disorganization, and implemented the Combat Information Centers, building on what was initially called "radar plot" according to an essay CIC Yesterday and Today by the Naval Historical Center. That same article points out that in 1942 radar, radar procedure, battle experiences, needs, and the operations room all grew up together as needs developed and experience was gained and training spread, all in fits and starts, beginning with the earliest radar uses in the Pacific battles starting with the Coral Sea, when radar gave rise to the first tentative attempt to vector an Air CAP to approaching Japanese flights, maturing somewhat before the Battle of Midway, where post-battle analysis of Coral Sea's results had given more confidence in the abilities and processes of a centralized control room.

The Naval History & Heritage Command essay notes that growing the responsibility of the nascent CIC organization necessarily upset the old order of doing, who was reporting to whom, and most of all, of communications protocols where now CICs within a task group were, when possible, joined in permanent communication links to even the lowliest destroyer escort or fleet auxiliary, adding the eyes and reports of their lookouts to those of similar watch-standers about the fleet as a whole. In short the CICs continually grew for a time, superseding old organizational structure and supplanting them with a new system filtering and shaping information to a newly empowered command group. The tasks and facilities put at the service of the CICs also grew within a ship. While in 1943 a destroyer CIC might just have been configured for anti-ship and anti-submarine warfare tasks, by the Battle of the Philippine Sea when set out as radar pickets had to undertake forward air controller (FAC) functions and somehow jam in air search radar and anti-air action control functions.

From that beginning, were added the corporate experiences of the continuing series of naval air and naval surface actions around and about the Battle of Guadalcanal in the Solomon Islands campaign. By late 1943 when the first new construction carriers of the Essex-class fleet carriers and the Independence-class light carriers with many associated fleet vessels had reinforced the refitted USS Enterprise (CV-6) and the USS Saratoga (CV-3), the U.S. Navy was prepared to take the offensive and began evolving CIC procedures and operational doctrine for a fleet of carriers.

There has been an evolution of electronics (computer) equipment and user interfaces used in such installations over time. Modern CIC equipment is built up from many connected embedded systems.

== See also ==
- List of established military terms
- Glossary of military abbreviations
- Command and control
- Comprehensive Display System
- Joint Tactical Information Distribution System
- Mission control center
- Naval Tactical Data System
- Situation room
- Tactical communications
- USS Moosehead (IX-98), a destroyer converted into a floating CIC simulator during WW2 to train CIC personnel
