= William S. McNair =

United States Army general

William Sharp McNair
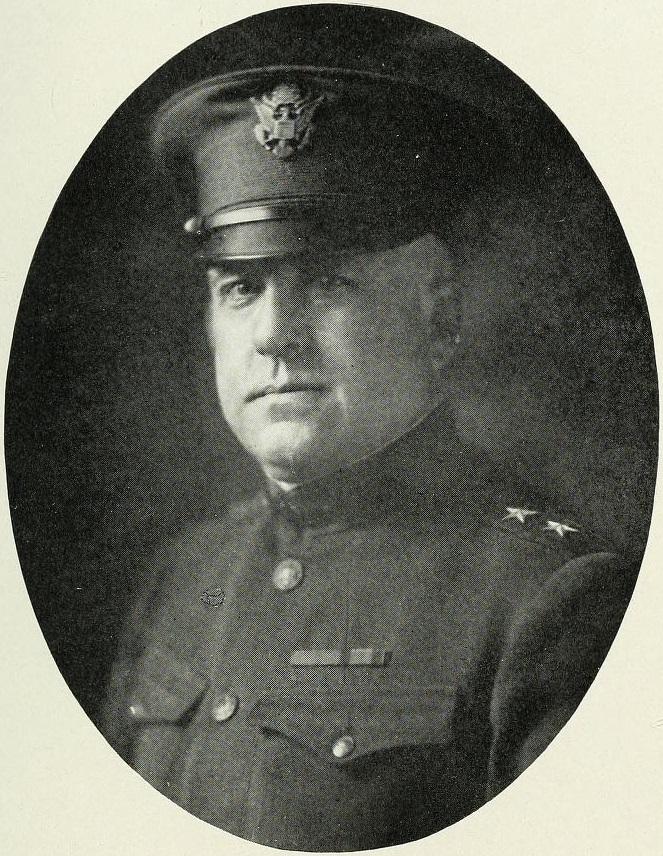
- From 1923's McNair, McNear, and McNeir Genealogies
- Born: September 18, 1868; Tecumseh, Michigan, U.S.
- Died: April 6, 1936 (aged 67); San Antonio, Texas, U.S.
- Burial place: Fort Sam Houston National Cemetery
- Military career
- Allegiance: United States
- Branch: United States Army
- Service years: 1894–1932
- Rank: Major General
- Unit: New York National Guard
- Commands: 151st Field Artillery Brigade
- Conflicts: Philippine–American War, World War I
- Awards: Silver Star Citation, Distinguished Service Medal

Major General William Sharp McNair (September 18, 1868 – April 6, 1936) was a U.S. Army general. During World War I, he commanded the artillery unit of the First Infantry Division and later the 151st Field Artillery Brigade.

== Early life ==
William Sharp McNair was born on September 18, 1868, in Tecumseh, Michigan. His father was also from Tecumseh and his mother from Bucyrus, Ohio. He entered the United States Military Academy and graduated number twenty-three of fifty-four in the class of 1890. He was commissioned in the Artillery Corps. His classmates there included Colden Ruggles, Fred W. Sladen, Frank M. Caldwell, Clint C. Hearn, Daniel W. Ketcham, Edgar Jadwin, Francis Marshall, Harry H. Bandholtz, Henry D. Todd Jr., William C. Davis, George G. Gatley, Herbert Deakyne and William J. Snow. All of these men would, like McNair himself, attain the rank of general officer.

== Military career ==
In 1896, McNair graduated from the Artillery School. He served in the China Relief Expedition, the Philippine–American War, and the Moro Expedition of 1903, for which he received his first Silver Star Citation. In 1916 and 1917, he served as brigadier general with the New York National Guard.

On October 17, 1917, McNair was aboard the SS Antilles when it was torpedoed and sunk by the U-62 three days out of Saint Nazaire, France.

In France, he commanded the artillery of the First Infantry Division, and he later commanded the 151st Field Artillery Brigade. He participated in the Meuse-Argonne and the Sedan battles. He served as Chief of Artillery, first Army, and received the Distinguished Service Medal and another Silver Star.

From 1920 to 1922, he was Chief of Staff of the Department of Panama. His rank of brigadier general was restored in 1930, and when he retired on September 30, 1932, he was a major general.

== Personal life ==
On December 26, 1894, he married Louise Bestor Potts, the daughter of army officer Ramsay D. Potts at Fort Barrancas, Florida. They were the parents of four children: Mary Louise McNair, Dorothy McNair, William Douglas McNair (USMA, class of 1918), and Norma B. McNair. In retirement, he lived in San Antonio, Texas. He was a Presbyterian. McNair died on April 6, 1936.

== Awards ==
He received the Army Distinguished Service Medal during World War I, with the medal's citation stating the following:

The President of the United States of America, authorized by Act of Congress, July 9, 1918, takes pleasure in presenting the Army Distinguished Service Medal to Major General William Sharp McNair, United States Army, for exceptionally meritorious and distinguished services to the Government of the United States, in a duty of great responsibility during World War I. Serving in turn as Commander of the 1st Field Artillery Brigade, 1st Division, and the 151st Field Artillery Brigade, 76th Division, as Chief of Artillery, 1st Army Corps, during the latter part of the Meuse-Argonne offensive and as Chief of Artillery of the 1st Army from 18 November 1918 until April 1919, by his marked ability, sound judgment, and thorough knowledge of artillery General McNair rendered conspicuous services in a position of great responsibility to the American Expeditionary Forces.

He received the Silver Star Citation for gallantry in action during the Philippine Insurrection, 1899 to 1902.
