= USS Stranger =

Gunboat of the United States Navy

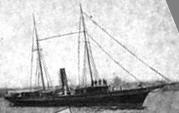

History

United States
- Name: USS Stranger
- Builder: William Cramp & Sons, Philadelphia
- Laid down: 1880
- Acquired: 1898
- Commissioned: June 30, 1898
- Stricken: October 23, 1915
- Fate: Sunk in a hurricane 1915

General characteristics
- Type: Yacht
- Displacement: 369 long tons (375 t)
- Length: 164 ft 7 in (50.17 m)
- Beam: 23 ft 7 in (7.19 m)
- Draft: 9 ft 2 in (2.79 m)
- Propulsion: Single screw
- Speed: 14 knots (26 km/h; 16 mph)
- Complement: 10 officers, 63 crew
- Armament: 1 × 14 pounder; 2 × 6 pounder; 2 × 1 pounder; 2 × 6 mm machine gun
- Notes: Loaned to Louisiana State Militia in November 1898.

The USS Stranger was a yacht built in 1880 by William Cramp & Sons and acquired in 1898 by the US Navy for use in the Spanish–American War. It was commissioned on June 30, 1898, and saw service in the West Indian Blocking Squadron off of Havana, Cuba.

Placed out of commission from September 24 to December 6, 1898, at the Norfolk Naval Yard, she was overhauled and refitted for service with the Louisiana Naval Militia for use in training. She was officially turned over to the Militia on November 16, 1898.

The ship served with the militia until the middle of October 1915, when she was sunk during a hurricane in New Orleans.

== Commanders ==
- 1898 George Leland Dyer
