= Ramsay D. Potts (brigadier general) =

US Army brigadier general

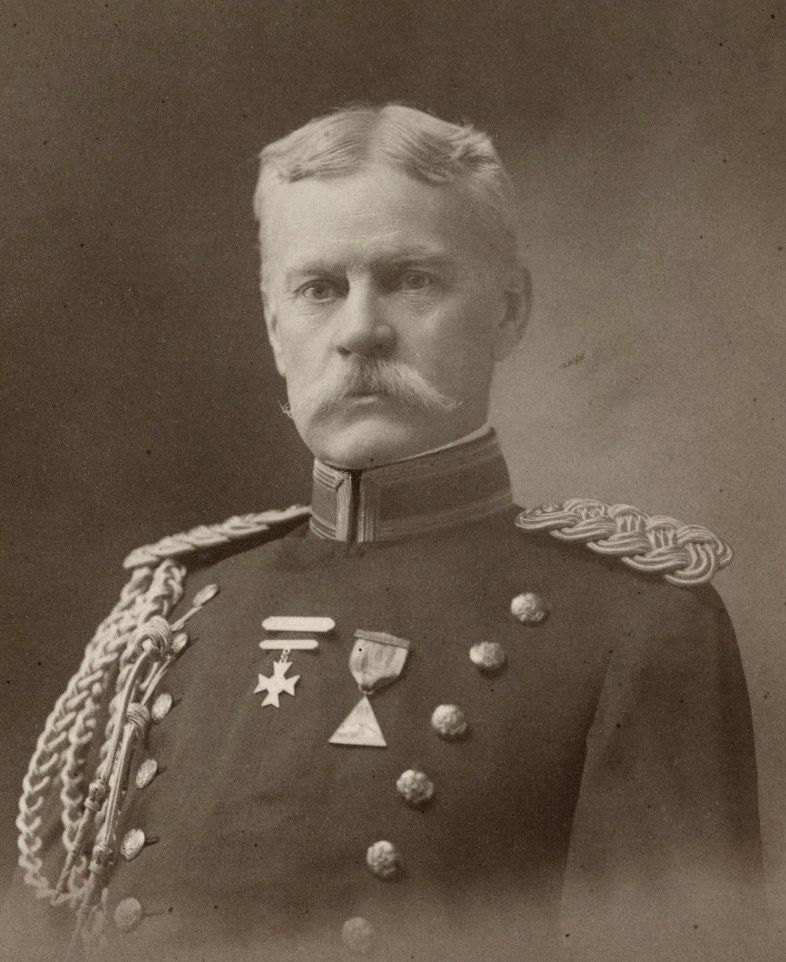
- Potts in 1906
- Born: 1 September 1850; Washington, DC, US
- Died: 17 October 1928 (aged 78); Washington, DC, US
- Burial place: Arlington National Cemetery
- Spouse: Mary M. Bestor (m. 1873–1928)
- Children: 3
- Relatives: Templin Potts (brother); William S. McNair (son-in-law)
- Military career
- Service: United States Army
- Service years: 1867–1914
- Rank: Brigadier General
- Units: US Army Artillery Branch; US Army Coast Artillery Corps
- Commands: Battery G, 3rd Field Artillery Regiment; Light Battery F, 3rd Field Artillery Regiment; 3rd Field Artillery Regiment; 5th Field Artillery Regiment; US Army Coast Artillery School; Department of Luzon; United States Army Command and General Staff College; Central Division; 4th Brigade, 2nd Division; 8th Brigade, 3rd Division; 7th Brigade, 3rd Division
- Wars: Spanish–American War; Philippine–American War; Mexican Border War
- Awards: Silver Star

Ramsay D. Potts (1 September 1850 – 17 October 1928) was a career officer in the United States Army. Appointed as a second lieutenant directly from civilian life in 1867, he served until 1914 and attained the rank of brigadier general. Potts received the Silver Star for heroism during the Spanish–American War, and he was also a veteran of the Philippine–American War and Mexican Border War. Potts' commands included the 3rd Field Artillery Regiment, 5th Field Artillery Regiment, US Army Coast Artillery School, Department of the Gulf, Department of Luzon, United States Army Command and General Staff College, Central Division, 4th Brigade, and 7th Brigade.

== Early life and start of career ==
Ramsay Douglas Potts was born in Washington, DC on 1 September 1850, a son of John Potts and Louisa Fontaine (Rose) Potts. (Note: Other individuals in the extended Potts family have also been named Ramsay Douglas Potts, including Ramsay D. Potts (1916–2006), a US Air Force Reserve major general and prominent attorney.) John Potts was the longtime chief clerk of the United States Department of War, which facilitated the start of Ramsay Potts' military career. Among Potts' siblings was Templin Potts, a longtime United States Navy officer. Potts was raised in Washington and received a private school education, and on 3 March 1867 he was commissioned in the United States Army directly from civilian life as a second lieutenant of Field Artillery.

Potts was initially assigned to the 3rd Field Artillery Regiment and posted to Fort Independence in Boston, where he remained until December. He was then posted to Fort Monroe, Virginia, where he was a student at the Field Artillery School from December 1867 to October 1868. He served briefly in Charleston, South Carolina from October to November 1868, after which he returned to the Field Artillery School for advanced training. Potts was promoted to first lieutenant in November 1869. He completed his Artillery School training in April 1870 and rejoined the 3rd Artillery.

=== Family ===
In September 1873, Potts married Mary MacLeod Bestor. They were married until his death and were the parents of three children. Louise Bestor Potts was the wife of army general William S. McNair. Son Douglas Potts was a career army officer and retired as a colonel. Son John Potts served in the army until receiving a commission in the United States Marine Corps, from which he retired with the rank of colonel.

== Continued career ==
From August 1872 to January 1873, Potts performed first temporary recruiting duty in Charleston, South Carolina, then duty as a court-martial member at Fort Whipple, Virginia. In January 1873, he was assigned as assistant commissary of subsistence for the 30th Artillery Regiment at Fort Wadsworth, New York. After transfer to the 3rd Artillery, Potts served at Fort Hamilton, New York; In October 1880, he was among the army officers designated to take part in Tarrytown's 100th anniversary commemoration of the capture of John André during the American Revolutionary War. In early 1881, Potts was among a 3rd Artillery contingent that trained National Guard units to participate in the March Inauguration of James A. Garfield, in which Potts also took part. In September 1881, he was acting quartermaster for the contingent of 3rd Artillery soldiers who marched from Governors Island, New York to Yorktown, Virginia, following the route taken by George Washington's forces in 1781 as part of commemorating the 100th anniversary of Siege of Yorktown that led to the end of the Revolutionary War. In 1882, Potts was assigned to Battery C, 3rd Artillery, which was stationed at Little Rock Arsenal. In February 1884 he was assigned duty as staff judge advocate for court-martials that took place at Mount Vernon Barracks, Alabama.

As his career continued, Potts was transferred between different 3rd Artillery batteries; in August 1886, he was a member of Battery I when it marched from Fort McHenry, Maryland to Washington Arsenal, DC to take part in gunnery practice at a longer range than what was possible at McHenry. He was serving as regimental quartermaster, commissary officer, and acting ordnance officer in October 1886 when he was transferred to Battery L. In May 1887, he was a member of the division of troops formed to take part in the dedication of the James A. Garfield Monument. In 1887 and 1888, he was assigned to extended court-martial duty in Washington, DC, both as a panel member and as staff judge advocate. In July 1888, he was serving at the Artillery School while a member of Battery L; at the completion of his school duties, he was posted to Battery M. In March 1889, the 3rd Artillery, including Potts, and other army units were included in the ceremonies for the Inauguration of Benjamin Harrison. In May 1889, Potts was one of the army officers assigned to judge corps of cadet teams from Washington's high schools as they took part in their annual drill and ceremony competition. In September 1889, he served on the staff of Brigadier General Horatio Gates Gibson, who commanded a brigade during a joint U.S–British reenactment of the War of 1812's Battle of North Point. After serving with the 3rd Artillery's Battery B, in April 1890 he was transferred to Battery M. In May 1890, he was assigned to court-martial duty at Fort Monroe, Virginia, after which he served as escort officer for 30 recruits who had been assigned to units at Fort Douglas, Utah.

== Later career ==
In July 1892, Potts was still assigned to Battery M, 3rd Artillery when he was promoted to captain and assigned to command Battery G. In December 1892, Battery G was transferred from Fort McHenry to Fort Barrancas, Florida. In April 1895, he was transferred from command of Battery G to command of Light Battery F. In 1895, Potts was a member of the army board the investigated and made recommendations on acquiring land to expand Fort Sam Houston. In 1896, he performed a similar function at Texas locations including Leon Springs, Kerrville, and Austin. In October 1896, he led Light Battery F when the 3rd Artillery was transferred to California; after arriving, Potts' battery was assigned to the Presidio of San Francisco. With the outbreak of the Spanish–American War in April 1898, the 3rd Artillery was slated for overseas service and Potts led Battery F to Chickamauga Park, Georgia organization and training. Potts commanded the battery during the Puerto Rico campaign, including combat at the Battle of Asomante. After the war, Potts continued to serve with the 3rd Artillery, now based at Fort Riley, Kansas.

Potts received promotion to major in February 1901, and in March he was detailed to temporary staff duty with the Office of the Inspector General of the United States Army. He was then posted to Manila, where he served during the Philippine–American War. In July 1903, Potts returned to the United States and was appointed inspector general for the Department of California. He was promoted to lieutenant colonel in July 1903. Potts commanded the Coast Artillery School at Fort Monroe from 1904 to 1906, and he served at the same time as a member of the Board of Ordnance and Fortifications and the Artillery School Board that revised drill regulations for Coast Artillery.

After his promotion to colonel in June 1905, Potts was assigned to command of first the 3rd Field Artillery Regiment, then the 5th Field Artillery Regiment, but was detailed to service on the army general staff from 1906 to 1908. After his June 1908 promotion to brigadier general, Potts commanded the army's Department of the Gulf from 1908 to 1909. From 1909 to 1910, he was assigned to command of the Department of Luzon in the Philippines. In January 1911, he was appointed commandant of the School of the Line (now the United States Army Command and General Staff College) and in June he was appointed to serve concurrently as commander of the army's new Central Division. In February 1913, Potts was appointed to command 4th Brigade, 2nd Division, which served in Texas during the Mexican Border War. In June 1913, he was appointed to command the army's 8th Brigade with headquarters at the Presidio of San Francisco. In January 1914, Potts assumed command of the 7th Brigade at Vancouver Barracks, Washington. Potts was scheduled to retire upon reaching the age of 64 in September; he requested early retirement, which was approved effective 30 April. At the time of his retirement, Potts was the senior officer in the army with respect to time in service.

In retirement, Potts resided in Washington, DC and maintained a summer home in Mountain Lake Park, Maryland. In February 1925, Potts was awarded a Citation Star to recognize his heroism in Puerto Rico during the Spanish–American War. In 1932, Citation Stars were converted to the Silver Star medal. Potts died in Washington on 17 October 1928. He was buried at Arlington National Cemetery.

== Dates of rank ==
Potts' dates of rank were:

- Second Lieutenant, 7 March 1867
- First Lieutenant, 2 November 1869
- Captain, 13 July 1892
- Major, 2 February 1901
- Lieutenant Colonel, 19 July 1903
- Colonel, 8 June 1905
- Brigadier General, 31 June 1908
- Brigadier General (retired), 30 April 1914
