= Cal Laning =

United States Navy officer

Caleb Barrett Laning
- Born: March 27, 1906; Kansas City, Missouri, US
- Died: May 31, 1991 (aged 85); Falls Church, Virginia, US
- Occupation: Naval officer

Rear Admiral Caleb Barrett Laning (born 27 March 1906, Kansas City, Missouri; died 31 May 1991, Falls Church, Virginia) was a highly decorated naval officer, writer, and technical adviser. Laning is buried in Arlington National Cemetery.

He was the nephew of four star Admiral Harris Laning.

== Combat Information Center role ==
Laning was involved in the development of the U.S. naval Combat Information Center (CIC) during World War II. The idea was taken "specifically, consciously, and directly" from the spaceship Directrix in the Lensman novels of E. E. Smith, Ph.D., and influenced by the works of his friend, collaborator, and Naval Academy classmate, fellow Missourian Robert Heinlein. However, for bureaucratic reasons, the source of the idea was not disclosed.

== See also ==
- Worldwide Military Command and Control System
