= Templin Potts =

American Governor of Guam (1855–1927)

Captain Templin Morris Potts
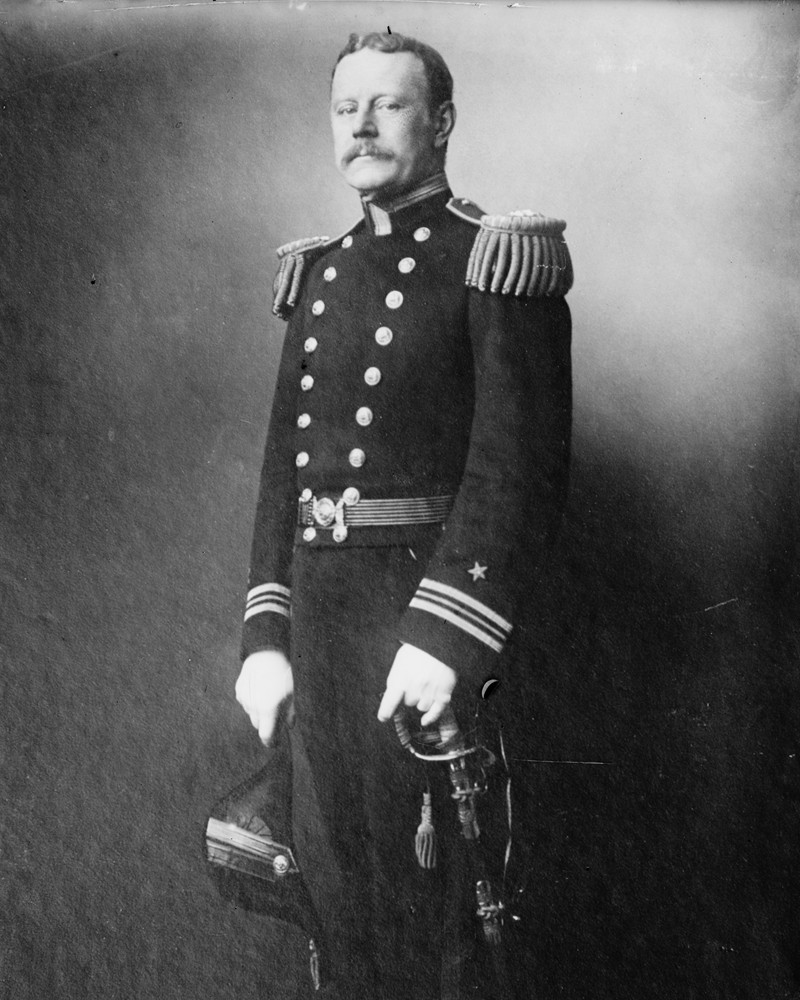
- Captain Templin Potts

11th Naval Governor of Guam
- In office December 3, 1906 – October 3, 1907
- Preceded by: Luke McNamee
- Succeeded by: Luke McNamee

14th Director of the Office of Naval Intelligence
- In office December 1909 – January 1912
- Preceded by: Charles E. Vreeland
- Succeeded by: Thomas S. Rodgers

Personal details
- Born: November 1, 1855 Washington, D.C., U.S.
- Died: March 22, 1927 (aged 71) Pasadena, California, U.S.
- Spouse(s): Anna Powers Cash Potts, Marie Charlier Potts
- Education: United States Naval Academy

Military service
- Allegiance: United States
- Branch/service: United States Navy
- Rank: Captain
- Commands: USS Des Moines (CL-17); USS Georgia (BB-15); Office of Naval Intelligence; USS Louisiana (BB-19)
- Battles/wars: Battle of Santiago de Cuba

Templin Morris Potts (November 1, 1855 – March 22, 1927) was a United States Navy Captain and the 11th Naval Governor of Guam. He held many important posts during his time in the Navy, including Director of the Office of Naval Intelligence, Naval attaché to Kaiser Wilhelm II, and aid for naval personnel. During the Spanish–American War, he participated in the Battle of Santiago de Cuba, after which he commanded a number of ships. In 1913, he was forced into retirement after not having spent a large enough portion of his service at sea. This forced retirement sparked outrage from many, and led to letters and marches of protest. A United States Senator even introduced a bill in Congress to have him re-instated. Though these efforts all ultimately failed, they led to greater scrutiny of the retirement board. As governor, he forbade the men under his command to marry native Chamorro women and increased funding to fight disease on Guam.

== Early life ==
Potts was born on November 1, 1855, in Washington, D.C., to John F. C. Potts and Louisa Elizabeth (nee Rose) Potts. Among his siblings was Ramsay D. Potts, who attained the rank of brigadier general in the U.S. Army. Potts received his education in the Washington area private school system.

== Education ==
On June 20, 1876, Potts graduated from the United States Naval Academy.

== Career ==
=== Naval ===
In 1877, Potts served aboard USS Plymouth as a midshipman. He also served aboard USS Swatara in 1879 and USS Palos from 1879 to 1892. During the Spanish–American War, he served aboard USS Massachusetts, where he participated in the Battle of Santiago de Cuba. From 1885 to 1887, he served on USS Pensacola.

On October 1, 1902, as lieutenant commander, Potts served as Naval attaché to Rome, Italy, Vienna, Austria, and Berlin, Germany, until December 30, 1904.

He served as commanding officer of USS Des Moines and of USS Georgia in 1908. That same year, he obtained the rank of Captain.

On December 17, 1909, Potts became the Director of the Office of Naval Intelligence, until January 25, 1912.

In 1911, he acted as the official United States representative for the reception of Japanese Admiral Tōgō Heihachirō. Soon after, he became Navy aid for personnel.

On May 3, 1913, Potts commanded USS Louisiana, until July 2, 1913. After this command, Potts was forced into retirement. The Captain had passed his examination for rear admiral, but had been let go nonetheless, as he had not spent at least half of his time as captain at sea. His case drew national attention after he saved Louisiana from flooding following a valve blowout in the ship's starboard engine room that left a hole in the ship's hull. He consulted his lawyers about the possibility of reinstatement, and a group of sailors protested the forced retirement through demonstrations and letter-writing, and a Senator even introduced a bill in Congress to reinstate him with the rank of Rear Admiral. Despite the criticism, the Navy did not reinstate him.

=== Governorship ===
Potts served as Governor of Guam from December 3, 1906, to October 3, 1907. Potts sought to separate whites from the native Chamorro population by denouncing interracial marriage, calling it "degenerating to the whites", and threatened to forcibly discharge any military man who married a native Guamanian woman. He successfully obtained additional funding from Congress to combat outbreaks of leprosy and yaws on the island.

== Personal life ==
On February 6, 1883, Potts married Anna Powers Cash. They had a son, Templin Morris Powers Potts. On May 10, 1902, Potts married Mrs. Marie Alden Brown (nee Charlier) (maiden), in a civil ceremony, in Berlin, Germany.

On November 21, 1918, Potts' wife, Marie Charlier Potts (died 1937), became a ship sponsor of USS Farragut (DD-300).

On March 22, 1927, Potts died in Pasadena, California. Potts is interred at Arlington National Cemetery in Arlington County, Virginia.
