= George Leland Dyer =

American naval commander

6th Naval Governor of Guam
- In office May 16, 1904 – November 2, 1905
- Preceded by: William Elbridge Sewell
- Succeeded by: Luke McNamee

Personal details
- Born: August 26, 1849 Calais, Maine, U.S.
- Died: April 2, 1914 (aged 64) Winter Park, Florida, U.S.
- Spouse: Susan Hart Dyer
- Children: 3

Military service
- Allegiance: United States
- Branch/service: United States Navy
- Years of service: 1871–1908

George Leland Dyer (August 26, 1849 in Calais, Maine – April 2, 1914 in Winter Park, Florida) was an American naval commander and the Governor of U.S. territory of Guam. In 1870, he graduated from the United States Naval Academy with honors and began his career in the United States Navy. During his career, he commanded the Stranger (1898), the Yankton (1898–1901), the Rainbow (1902–1903), and the Albany (1903–1904).

From 1904–1905, he served as Governor of Guam.

In 1908, he was promoted to Commodore and retired that year.

Dyer was the brother of inventor Leonard Dyer and father of composer Susan Hart Dyer.

== Authorship ==
- Translated Practical Hints in Regard to West Indian Hurricanes from Spanish in 1885
- Wrote The Use of Oil to Lessen the Dangerous Effect of Heavy Seas in 1886
- Published an article in National Geographic magazine entitled Geography of the Sea in 1889.

== Personal life ==
In 1875 Dyer married Susan Hart Palmer. They had three children, George, Susan (Daisy), and Dorothy. Dyer and his family lived in places including Guam and Winter Park, Florida.

On April 2, 1914, Dyer died in Winter Park, Florida.

Military offices
Preceded by William Elbridge Sewell	Naval Governor of Guam; 1905–1906	Succeeded by Luke McNamee
