= 16th Texas Cavalry Regiment =

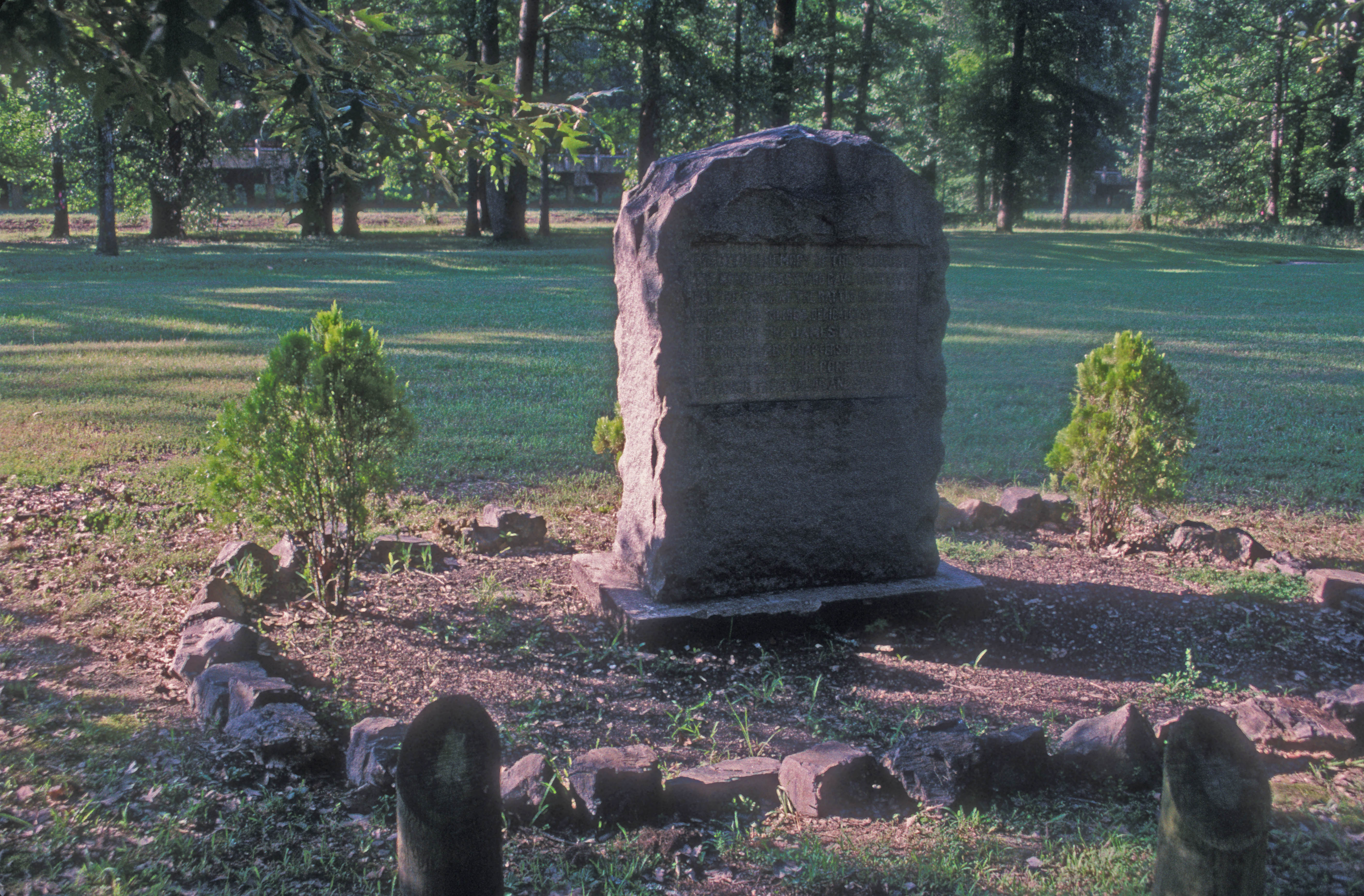
- Confederate monument at Jenkins' Ferry
- Active: April 1862 – 26 May 1865
- Country: Confederate States of America
- Allegiance: Confederate States of America, Texas
- Branch: Confederate States Army
- Type: Cavalry
- Size: Regiment
- Nickname(s): Fitzhugh's Cavalry, Bloody 16th
- Engagements: American Civil War; Battle of Cotton Plant (1862); Battle of Milliken's Bend (1863); Battle of Mansfield (1864); Battle of Pleasant Hill (1864); Battle of Jenkins' Ferry (1864)

Commanders
- Notable commanders: William F. Fitzhugh

The 16th Texas Cavalry Regiment was a unit of mounted volunteers from Texas that fought in the Confederate States Army during the American Civil War. The regiment was recruited in early 1862 and mustered into Confederate service in April 1862. The unit fought as cavalry at the Battle of Cotton Plant but it was dismounted in the summer of 1862. The 16th Cavalry served as infantry in Walker's Texas Division for the remainder of the war. The regiment fought at Milliken's Bend, Mansfield, Pleasant Hill, and Jenkins' Ferry. The unit marched to Texas in early 1865 and disbanded in May 1865.

== History ==
=== Formation ===
In April 1862, the regiment organized at Dallas and mustered into Confederate service in the middle of April. Nearly 1,000 horsemen were recruited and they were formed into ten companies. The soldiers hailed mostly from Collin, Cooke, and Grayson Counties. The field officers were Colonel William F. Fitzhugh, Lieutenant Colonel Edward P. Gregg, and Major William W. Diamond. The regiment would have several nicknames including Bloody Sixteenth, Briscoe's Cavalry, Daugherty's Cavalry, Diamond's Cavalry, Fitzhugh's Cavalry, and Gregg's Cavalry.

=== 1862 ===
In March 1862, Earl Van Dorn received an order to transfer his Army of the West to Corinth, Mississippi. Van Dorn moved all available soldiers, ammunition, food, and weapons to the east side of the Mississippi River. The Union Army of the Southwest under Samuel Ryan Curtis marched south from Missouri and captured Batesville, Arkansas on 2 May. Though Curtis was soon compelled to transfer ten infantry regiments east of the Mississippi, his army still posed major threat to eastern Arkansas. The only Confederate general officer in the state, John Selden Roane started to detain Texas cavalry regiments as they crossed Arkansas on their way to Memphis, Tennessee. Roane also pleaded for a new overall commander, so Thomas C. Hindman was sent to take charge. The new commander was shocked to find few soldiers and military equipment to defend the state. Hindman improvised an army of 4,000 Texas cavalry and 1,500 Arkansas infantry within a fairly short time. In May, Curtis reported a strength of 6,000 infantry, 3,000 cavalry, and 1,000 artillerymen.

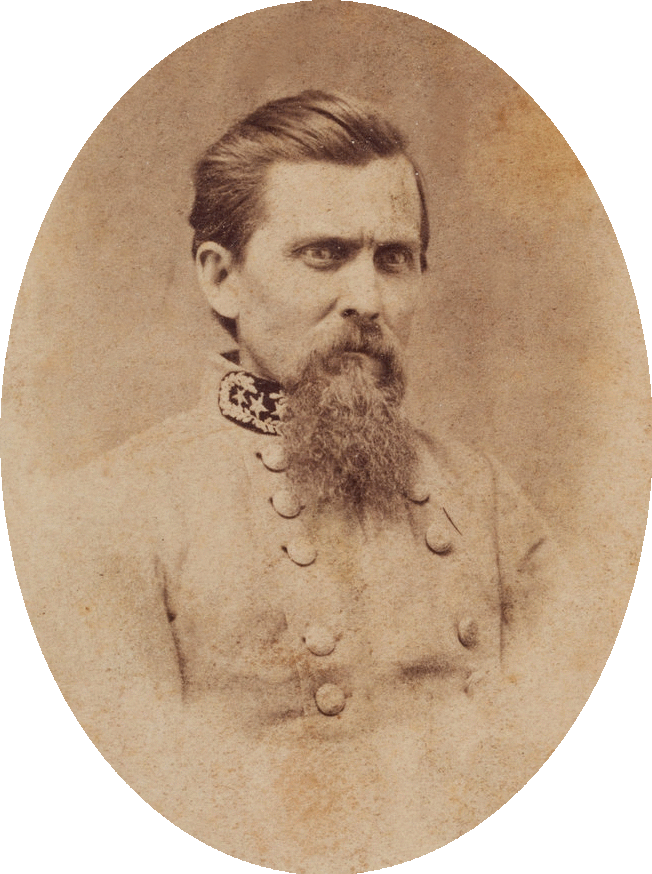
John George Walker

Curtis tried to march to Little Rock but his supply line broke down and he abandoned the effort. Then Curtis's army moved south down the White River. The 16th Texas fought at the Battle of Cotton Plant on 7 July 1862. In this action, the Federal troops were opposed by Albert Rust with 5,000 Arkansas infantry and Texas cavalry. While his army crossed the Cache River, Curtis sent Charles Edward Hovey with 400 soldiers and one cannon to scout ahead. Near Parley Hill's plantation, the Federals bumped into 1,000 men from the 12th Texas Cavalry and 16th Texas Cavalry Regiments under William Henry Parsons. Colonel Fitzhugh led the 16th Cavalry during the battle. After the initial contact, the Texans compelled part of Hovey's troops to retreat. Emerging from a wooded area and seeing the backs of their enemies, the Texas cavalry charged up the road. They ran into an ambush by three companies of the 33rd Illinois Infantry Regiment hidden in a cornfield. After a few volleys emptied a number of saddles, the Texans dispersed into the woods. After a lull, 200 Union troops and two more cannons reinforced Hovey and began to push back the Texans. Later in the day another Union brigade under William P. Benton arrived as reinforcements. Rust's troops retreated behind the lower Cache River and destroyed their boats. One soldier of the 12th Texas wrote that his unit lost 14 killed, 20 seriously wounded, 16 slightly wounded, and two missing. He believed that the 16th suffered similar losses. Hindman was critical of Rust's handling of the battle.

The 16th Texas Cavalry was ordered to dismount and fight as infantry in July 1862. This proved very unpopular since most Texans considered themselves horsemen. Altogether, four regiments were dismounted because of the scarcity of food for horses. This caused a number of men to desert. Diseases also killed many soldiers or rendered them unfit for service. In October 1862, Henry Eustace McCulloch began organizing a Texas infantry division. On 1 January 1863, John George Walker assumed command of the division and led it until the end of the war. It was originally formed into four brigades, but the 4th Brigade was soon captured at the Battle of Arkansas Post. The 3rd Brigade consisted of the 16th, 17th, and 19th Texas Infantry Regiments, the 16th Cavalry (dismounted), and Edgar's Texas Battery. Later, the 2nd Texas Partisan Rangers Regiment (dismounted) was added to the brigade. The 3rd Texas Infantry Regiment served briefly with the brigade in 1864 but was soon sent home. The 3rd Brigade's commanders during the war were George M. Flournoy, McCulloch, William Read Scurry, and Richard Waterhouse.

=== 1863–1865 ===
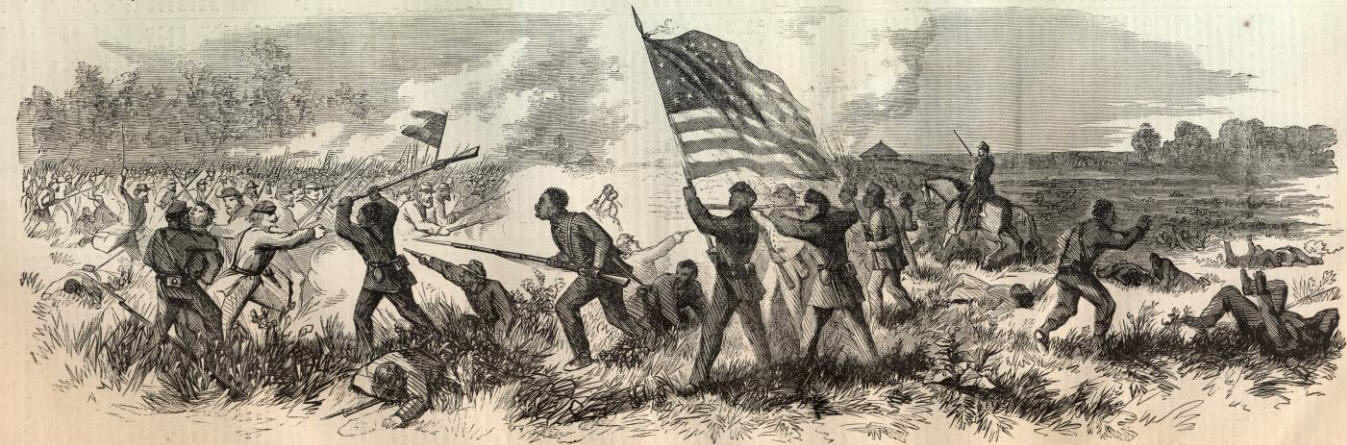
Battle of Milliken's Bend

In mid-1863, a Confederate army was surrounded in the Siege of Vicksburg. Richard Taylor was ordered to launch operations to help the defenders of Vicksburg. Walker's Texas Division arrived at Richmond, Louisiana on 6 June where Taylor made attack plans. That day, a Union force consisting of the 9th Louisiana Infantry Regiment (former African-American slaves) and elements of the 10th Illinois Cavalry Regiment under Herman Lieb made a reconnaissance toward Richmond which resulted in skirmishing. After withdrawing to Milliken's Bend, Lieb requested reinforcements and directed his soldiers to fortify their camp with cotton bales and abatis. Soon the Federal defenders were reinforced by the 23rd Iowa Volunteer Infantry Regiment and the gunboat USS Choctaw. That night Walker's troops started their approach march, planning to attack the Union camps at dawn. McCulloch's 3rd Brigade took the left fork toward Milliken's Bend while James Morrison Hawes's 1st Brigade took the right fork toward Young's Point. Walker held back Horace Randal's 2nd Brigade as a reserve.

At 2:30 am, the Battle of Milliken's Bend started when the 3rd Brigade encountered the Union pickets. McCulloch deployed his 1,500 soldiers with the 16th Texas Cavalry on the left, 17th Texas Infantry in the center, 19th Texas Infantry on the right, and 16th Texas Infantry in reserve. Lieb commanded 1,061 defenders in the 8th Louisiana, 9th Louisiana, 11th Louisiana, 13th Louisiana, 1st Mississippi, and 23rd Iowa. The Texans pressed back the Union defenders through a series of hedgerows before arriving in front of the Federal main line of defense. Screaming, "No quarter for the officers. Kill the damned abolitionists!" the Texans charged. After receiving a murderous volley from the defenders, the attackers rushed forward and got among the poorly trained ex-slaves before they could reload their weapons. McCulloch reported that the white troops fled first while the black soldiers fought stubbornly. After breaking through the first line, the Texans charged a second line but were driven back by the big guns of the Choctaw. When the USS Lexington was seen approaching, McCulloch called off the attack and ordered a retreat. The Confederates lost 44 killed, 131 wounded, and 10 missing while the Union lost 101 killed, 285 wounded, and 266 missing. The 16th Cavalry suffered losses of 19 killed, 47 wounded, and one missing.

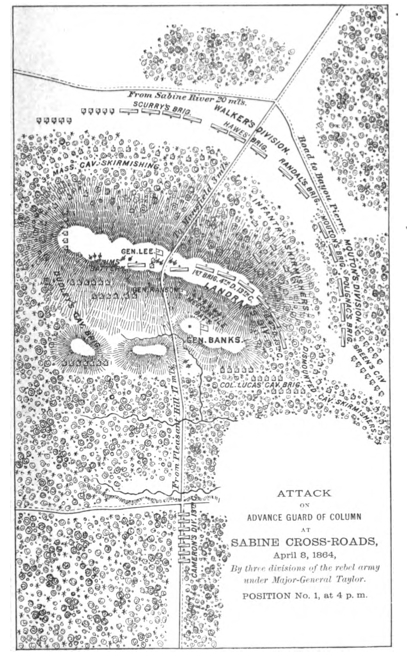
Battle of Mansfield map shows Scurry's brigade at top center.

In July 1863 the 16th Texas Cavalry marched 300 mi (483 km) across central and northern Louisiana. Private Andrew Jackson Lucas remembered that the soldiers were often underfed and, "We had but little in the way of camp equipage and suffered much from rain and cold." The regiment spent January and February 1864 at Camp Glenwood in Louisiana. Private J. B. Briscoe was sent on a detail to Texas to gather beef cattle for the Confederate government. Briscoe wrote, "My battles were against hunger. We were often fed on corn in the shuck, sometimes wheat bran alone, and sometimes bacon alone."

The regiment fought at the Battle of Mansfield on 8 April 1864 and at the Battle of Pleasant Hill the following day. Taylor had 9,000 troops available at Mansfield. He deployed Walker's division on the right and Alfred Mouton's division on the left, with cavalry covering both flanks. The Union army of Nathaniel P. Banks had at least 20,000 soldiers, but they were strung out in a long column. After Mouton's division charged the Federals and overwhelmed their opponents, Walker's division also attacked, completing the rout. Of 12,000 Union troops engaged, 2,235 became casualties and the Confederates captured 20 guns and 200 wagons. Confederate casualties were less than half of the Federal loss. That evening, Taylor was reinforced to 12,500 men and he attacked the next day at Pleasant Hill. Walker's division was ordered to hold the Union army in front while Thomas James Churchill's infantry attacked on the right and Tom Green's cavalry went forward on the left. Mouton's division, now under Camille Polignac (Mouton had been killed), was in reserve. Churchill's troops enjoyed initial success but were soon driven back by veteran Union troops under Andrew Jackson Smith. Walker was badly wounded and the action was a tactical defeat for the Confederates. The Union army sustained 1,369 casualties while the Confederates lost 1,626. Nevertheless, Banks abandoned the Red River campaign and retreated.

After Pleasant Hill, Edmund Kirby Smith ordered the divisions of Churchill, Mosby Monroe Parsons, and Walker to march north to deal with the threat of Frederick Steele's Union force in Arkansas. Steele's troops occupied Camden, Arkansas but a lack of supplies and a defeat at the Battle of Marks' Mills made their position weak. On 26 April, Steele's column withdrew from Camden headed back to Little Rock. By 29 April the Federals were crossing the Saline River at Jenkins' Ferry. The 16th Texas Cavalry fought at the Battle of Jenkins' Ferry on 30 April 1864. The Union troops defended a position on the south side of the river between a flooded creek and a swamp, leaving their attackers no room for maneuver. That morning, the divisions of Churchill, Parsons, and Walker were flung into the attack, one after another, to be met with a vigorous defense. By 12:30 all attacks were beaten back and Steele's column continued its retreat. The 3rd Brigade's General Scurry and the 2nd Brigade's General Randal were both killed. In June 1864, Walker was promoted to lead the District of West Louisiana and John Horace Forney took command of the Texas Division. In March and April 1865, the division marched back to Texas. The 16th Texas Cavalry disbanded on 26 May 1865 at Camp Groce in Hempstead, Texas.

== See also ==
- List of Texas Civil War Confederate units
- Texas in the Civil War
