= Richard Waterhouse =

Richard Waterhouse may refer to:

- Richard Green Waterhouse (1855–1922), American Methodist bishop
- Richard Waterhouse (general) (1832–1876), American Civil War general
