= 49th United States Colored Infantry Regiment =

Coordinates: 32.44°N 91.10°W

11th Louisiana Infantry Regiment (African Descent) 49th United States Colored Infantry
- Active: May 23 of 1863 – March 27, 1866
- Disbanded: March 27, 1866
- Country: United States
- Allegiance: Union
- Branch: Infantry
- Size: Regiment
- Engagements: American Civil War: Vicksburg Campaign; Battle of Milliken's Bend; Expedition to Waterproof, LA, 1864

Commanders
- Colonel: Edwin W. Chamberlain
- Colonel: Van Eps Young

The 49th United States Colored Infantry, first established as the 11th Louisiana Infantry (African descent) was an infantry regiment in the Union Army during the American Civil War.

== Milliken's Bend and the Vicksburg campaign ==
The unit was organized at Milliken's Bend, Louisiana in the summer of 1863. Many of the men were escaped slaves from Louisiana plantations, some joined voluntarily but others were impressed or virtually coerced into joining the army. On June 7, 1863 the 11th Louisiana fought at the Battle of Milliken's Bend. This was one of the first major battles involving Black soldiers, and the 11th Louisiana took heavy casualties, losing 21 killed, 111 wounded, and 114 missing. While the men of the regiment were heavily engaged, the commanding officer Colonel Edwin W. Chamberlain rowed out to a Union gunboat in the Mississippi River to observe the fighting from a distance, an action that General Elias Smith Dennis called "very unsoldierlike". Chamberlain would later resign as commanding officer in September, 1863, and was replaced by Colonel Van Eps Young. Many of the men reported missing returned to their regiment after the chaos of battle had subsided, but others were captured by the Confederates and forced back into slavery.

Along with the 1st and 3rd Mississippi Regiments and the Louisiana 8th, 9th, 10th and 12th Regiments (African Descent) the 11th Regiment was attached to the African Brigade, District of Northeast Louisiana, until July 1863. They were posted at Goodrich's Landing until January 1864 and at Vicksburg, Mississippi between January and March 1864. An expedition to Waterproof, Louisiana was undertaken from January to February 1864, during which the regiment lost 4 killed and 1 wounded.

== 49th United States Colored Regiment Infantry ==
The designation of the regiment was changed to the 49th Regiment Infantry, U.S. Colored Troops on March 11, 1864. The regiment served on garrison duty at Vicksburg, Mississippi for the remainder of the war, and mustered out on March 27, 1866.

== See also ==
- List of Louisiana Union Civil War units
