= 16th Texas Infantry Regiment =

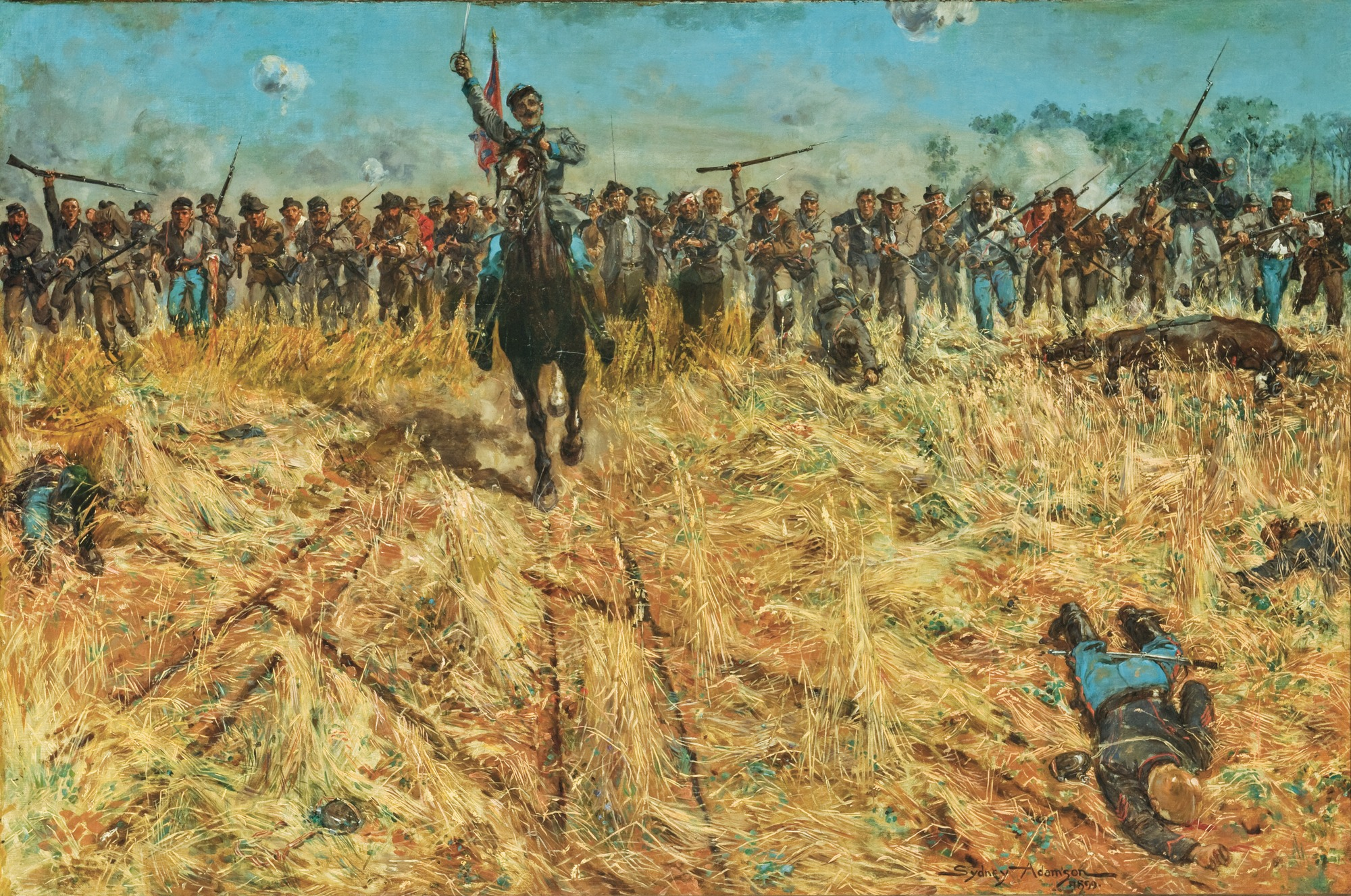
- The Rebel Charge by Sydney Adamson
- Active: March 1862 – April 1865
- Country: Confederate States of America
- Allegiance: Confederate States of America, Texas
- Branch: Confederate States Army
- Type: Infantry
- Size: Regiment
- Engagements: American Civil War; Battle of Milliken's Bend (1863); Action at Opelousas (1863); Battle of Mansfield (1864); Battle of Pleasant Hill (1864); Battle of Jenkins' Ferry (1864)

Commanders
- Notable commanders: George Flournoy

The 16th Texas Infantry Regiment was a unit of volunteers recruited in Texas that fought in the Confederate States Army during the American Civil War. George Flournoy, the former Attorney General of the state of Texas, organized the regiment at Camp Groce in March 1862. Its entire career was spent west of the Mississippi River in the Trans-Mississippi Department. It marched to Arkansas where it camped during the winter of 1862–1863. During that period, the unit was assigned to the 3rd Brigade of the Texas infantry division later known as Walker's Greyhounds. In June 1863, it fought at Milliken's Bend and in October 1863 it skirmished at Opelousas, Louisiana. The regiment was in action at Mansfield, Pleasant Hill, and Jenkins' Ferry in 1864. The regiment disbanded at the end of April 1865, but Flournoy and some soldiers crossed into Mexico and fought for Maximilian I of Mexico. Littleton W. Moore, who fought with the regiment, later became a United States congressman.
