= Van Eps Young =

19th century American politician

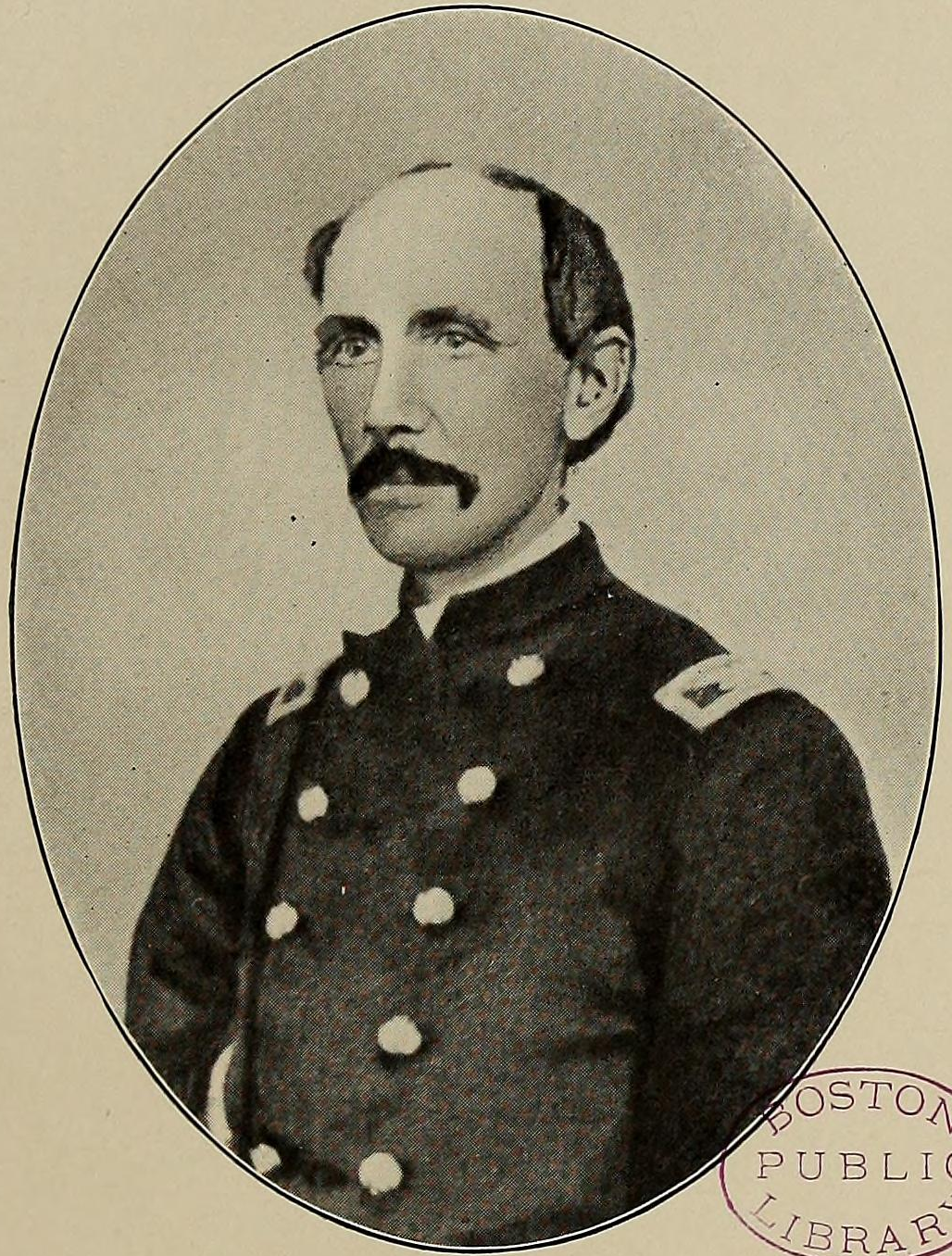
- Portrait from Youngs Family (1907)

Member of the Wisconsin Senate from the 1st district
- In office January 7, 1867 – October 1867
- Preceded by: John A. Bentley
- Succeeded by: Robert H. Hotchkiss

Personal details
- Born: September 30, 1822 Auburn, New York, U.S.
- Died: December 12, 1895 (aged 73) Grand Rapids, Michigan, U.S.
- Resting place: Oakhill Cemetery, Grand Rapids, Michigan
- Party: Republican; Natl. Union (1860s)
- Spouse: Arilsle Crane Seaman (m. 1852; died 1883)
- Children: 6

Military service
- Allegiance: United States
- Branch/service: United States Volunteers; Union Army
- Rank: Colonel, USV
- Unit: 17th Reg. Wis. Vol. Infantry; 14th Reg. Wis. Vol. Infantry; 10th Reg. La. Vol. Infantry
- Commands: 49th Reg. U.S. Colored Infantry
- Battles/wars: American Civil War: Battle of Shiloh; Vicksburg Campaign

Van Eps Young (September 30, 1822 – December 12, 1895) was an American businessman, politician, and Wisconsin pioneer. He was a member of the Wisconsin Senate, representing Sheboygan County during the 1867 session. He served throughout the American Civil War with the Union Army, and helped organize two regiments of United States Colored Troops. His middle name is sometimes spelled "Epps".

== Early life ==
Van Eps Young was born in Auburn, New York, in September 1822. He was raised and educated in New York, then came west to the Wisconsin Territory in 1844, settling first in Racine. After a few years in Racine, he went north to Sheboygan, Wisconsin, which remained his home for much of the next 20 years. In Sheboygan, he worked as a livery keeper and operated a produce shop.

== Civil War service ==
At the outbreak of the American Civil War, Young joined up as a private with a company of volunteers which was enrolled as Company E of the 17th Wisconsin Infantry Regiment. But shortly after that regiment mustered into service, he was transferred to the 14th Wisconsin Infantry Regiment and commissioned as first lieutenant of Company H in that regiment. He joined the 14th Wisconsin Infantry as it was still being organized near Savannah, Tennessee; from there, they were summoned to the nearby Battle of Shiloh, which had begun unexpectedly. They arrived at the battlefield on the evening of the first day of the battle, and were then engaged in heavy fighting throughout the second day—charging and seizing an enemy battery, suffering 146 casualties (out of about 600 men active at the time).

Due to a large number of wounded or killed officers, Young became acting adjutant of the regiment shortly after the battle, and was formally promoted to adjutant in September 1862 (retroactive to July 1862), and ultimately served in that role until May 1863. During this time, the regiment was engaged in operations for control of the Tennessee–Mississippi border, and then joined Grant's Vicksburg Campaign.

During the Vicksburg campaign, Young was detached from his regiment to assist in recruiting freed Africans to serve in Union Army regiments. In May 1863, he was commissioned lieutenant colonel of the 10th Louisiana Infantry Regiment—which later became the 48th United States Colored Infantry Regiment. He assisted in organizing this regiment until October 1863, when he was promoted to colonel and placed in command of the 11th Louisiana Infantry Regiment, which then became the 49th United States Colored Infantry Regiment in March 1864.

In this role, he became a brigade commander of forces posted around Vicksburg after the city fell to the Union and was formally appointed provost marshal of the western district of Mississippi, serving in that role through most of 1864, all of 1865, and into 1866.

He was honorably discharged in June 1866.

== Postbellum career ==
Following the war, Young returned to Sheboygan, Wisconsin. That fall, he was elected to the Wisconsin Senate from Shebyogan's State Senate district—the 1st State Senate district—running on the National Union ticket.

He served through the 1867 session but resigned in the Fall of 1867—with a year left in his term—and moved to Grand Rapids, Michigan. In Grand Rapids, he worked as an accountant and served a term as superintendent of the city police in the 1880s.

== Personal life and family ==
Van Eps Young was one of five children born to Abram Van Eps and Lydia Hutchinson (née Whipple) Young. Abram Van Eps Young was a major in the New York militia and served in the cavalry during the War of 1812. The Young family were descendants of Reverend John Youngs, who was the first English colonist to settle in Southold, New York.

Van Eps Young married Arilsle Crane Seaman, of Lancaster, New York, on August 26, 1852, at Sheboygan. They had six children together and their marriage lasted 30 years, ending with her death in 1883. Their eldest son, Abram Van Eps Young, became a notable scholar and was chairman of the chemistry department at Northwestern University for 34 years.

Van Eps Young died at his home in Grand Rapids on December 12, 1895, and was survived by all six of his children.

Military offices
Preceded by Edwin W. Chamberlain	Command of the 49th United States Colored Infantry Regiment; October 8, 1863 – March 27, 1866	Regiment abolished
Wisconsin Senate
Preceded by John A. Bentley	Member of the Wisconsin Senate from the 1st district January 7, 1867 – October 1867	Succeeded by Robert H. Hotchkiss
