= Francis Munroe Ramsay =

United States Navy admiral

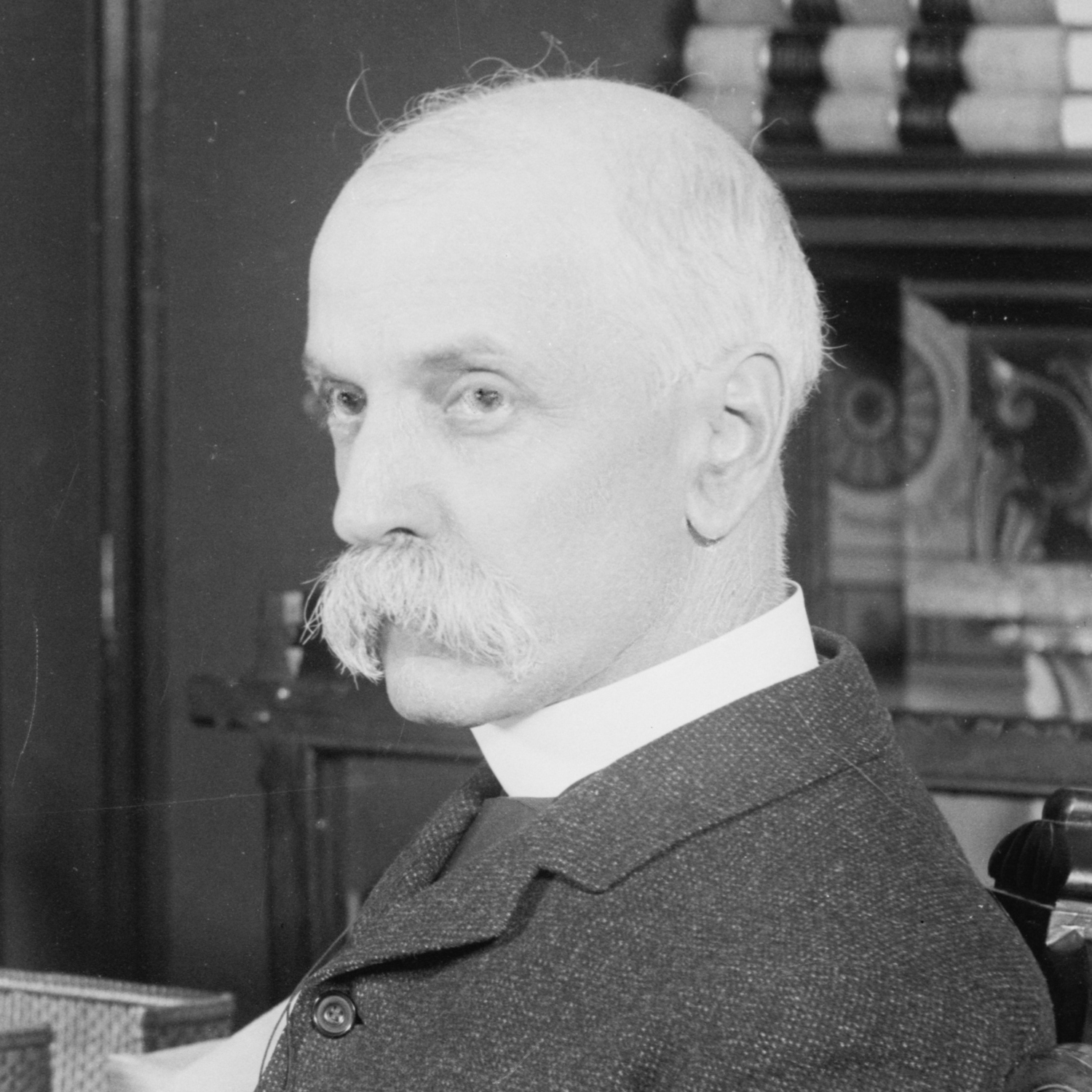
- Ramsay in 1892
- Born: April 5, 1835; Washington, D.C., U.S.
- Died: July 19, 1914 (aged 79); Washington, D.C., U.S.
- Military career
- Allegiance: United States of America
- Branch: United States Navy
- Service years: 1850–1897
- Rank: Rear admiral
- Commands: USS Choctaw; USS Unadilla; USS Guerriere; USS Ossipee; USS Lancaster; USS Boston; USS Trenton; Bureau of Navigation
- Conflicts: American Civil War

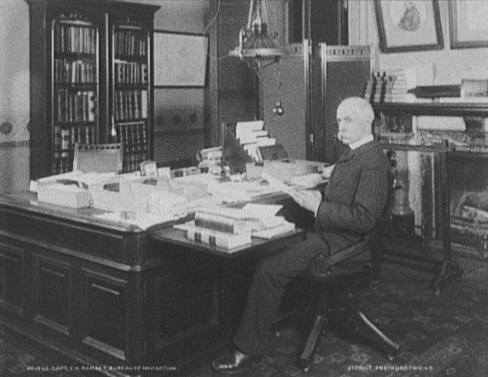
Francis Munroe Ramsay, 1892

Admiral Francis Munroe Ramsay (April 5, 1835 – July 19, 1914) was an officer in the United States Navy who distinguished himself in the American Civil War, and who later served as Chief of the Navy's Bureau of Navigation.

== Early life and career ==
Born in the District of Columbia, Ramsay was appointed midshipman on October 5, 1850. After training in Preble and in St. Lawrence, he graduated from the U.S. Naval Academy in 1856. He subsequently served in Falmouth with the Brazil Squadron; in Merrimack with the Pacific Squadron; on ordnance duty at the Washington Navy Yard; and in Saratoga when working with the Royal Navy's Commander-in-Chief, Cape of Good Hope and West Africa.

== Civil War service ==
On March 23, 1863, he assumed command of Choctaw, for duty in the Mississippi Squadron. In that gunboat, he participated in Yazoo River operations during April and May. Then on June 7, he supported a Union garrison at Milliken's Bend, Louisiana in holding off some 4,000 Confederate troops. Moving on to Vicksburg, he commanded a battery of heavy guns mounted on scows in exposed positions before the city, June 19 – July 4. After the capture of the river stronghold, he was given command of the 3d Division, Mississippi Squadron.

During February and March 1864, he led expeditions up the Black and Ouachita Rivers and from mid-March to early May participated in Rear Admiral David Dixon Porter's expedition up the Red River. On September 28, he was transferred to the North Atlantic Blockading Squadron in command of Unadilla.

He participated in the amphibious assaults on Fort Fisher December 24, 1864 and on January 13, 1865, and in subsequent attacks against Fort Anderson and other forts along the Cape Fear River. In April, he assisted in removing torpedoes (mines) from the James River and was present at the capture of Richmond.

== Post-Civil War service ==
After the Civil War, Ramsay served in many and varied positions afloat; as Fleet Captain, South Atlantic Squadron and as commanding officer of Guerriere, Ossipee, Lancaster, Boston, and Trenton. Ashore, he served at the Naval Academy, at Newport, in London as naval attaché, and at Boston and New York as commandant of the Navy Yards. In 1889 he became Chief of the Bureau of Navigation and remained in that post until his retirement April 5, 1897.

He was promoted to rear admiral on April 5, 1894, and died in Washington, D.C. July 19, 1914.

== Legacy ==
In 1918, the destroyer Ramsay (DD-124) was named in his honor.

== See also ==
- List of superintendents of the United States Naval Academy

Academic offices
Preceded by Christopher R.P. Rodgers	Superintendent of United States Naval Academy; 1881-1886	Succeeded by William T. Sampson
