= William P. McLean =

American politician (1836–1925)

William Pinckney McLean
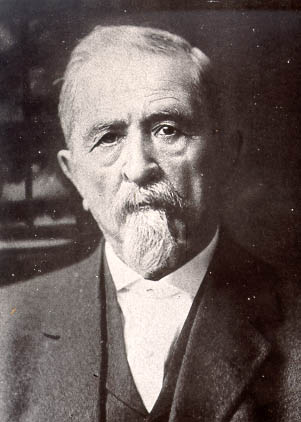

Railroad Commissioner of Texas
- In office June 10, 1891 – November 20, 1894
- Appointed by: Jim Hogg
- Preceded by: Office established
- Succeeded by: Leonidas Jefferson Storey

Member of the U.S. House of Representatives from Texas's 2nd district
- In office March 4, 1873 – March 3, 1875
- Preceded by: John C. Conner
- Succeeded by: David B. Culberson

Member of the Texas House of Representatives
- In office February 8, 1870 – January 14, 1873 Serving with Russell Latimer Moore
- Preceded by: J. R. Lyons
- Succeeded by: William A. Ellett; William L. Mabry; William Augustus Shaw; Hilary Manning
- Constituency: 9th district
- In office November 4, 1861 – January 7, 1862 Serving with Frances Marlon Taylor
- Preceded by: William Henry Stewart
- Succeeded by: Jacob B. Reid
- Constituency: 62nd district

Personal details
- Born: August 9, 1836 Copiah County, Mississippi, U.S.
- Died: March 13, 1925 (aged 88) Fort Worth, Texas, U.S.
- Party: Democratic
- Education: University of North Carolina

Military service
- Allegiance: Confederacy
- Branch/service: Confederate States Army
- Rank: Major
- Unit: 19th Texas Infantry Regiment
- Battles/wars: American Civil War

William Pinckney McLean (August 9, 1836 – March 13, 1925) was an American politician, lawyer, and judge. He represented Texas's 2nd congressional district in the 43rd United States Congress, from 1873 to 1875. He was a member of the Texas House of Representatives during the American Civil War and resigned his seat to fight for the Confederacy.

== Biography ==
Born in Copiah County, Mississippi, McLean moved with his mother to Marshall, Texas, in 1839. He attended private schools and graduated from the law department of the University of North Carolina, where he was a member and for some time the secretary pro tempore of the Philanthropic Society, in 1857 and was admitted to the bar the next year. McLean commenced the practice of his profession at Jefferson, Texas. He became a member of the Texas House of Representatives in 1861. McLean resigned to enter the Confederate States Army as a private of the 19th Texas Infantry Regiment, in the third brigade of Walker's Texas Division. He was promoted to captain and then major, and served throughout the Civil War. In 1869, he was elected again as a state representative. He represented the 9th district in the Texas House of Representatives from February 8, 1870 to January 14, 1873.

McLean was elected as a Democrat to the 43rd United States Congress. He was not a candidate for renomination in 1874 and resumed the practice of law in Mount Pleasant, Texas. In 1875, he was a member of the State constitutional convention.

McLean was elected judge of the fifth judicial district in 1884, but declined to be a candidate for reelection. He was appointed by Governor Hogg as a member of the first State railroad commission in 1891. After leaving office, McLean moved to Fort Worth, Texas, and resumed the practice of his profession. He died in Fort Worth on March 13, 1925.

== Sources ==
- United States Congress. "William P. McLean (id: M000553)". Biographical Directory of the United States Congress.

U.S. House of Representatives
Preceded by John C. Conner	Member of the U.S. House of Representatives from Texas's 2nd congressional district March 4, 1873 - March 3, 1875	Succeeded by David B. Culberson
