= John C. Conner =

American politician (1842–1873)

John Conner
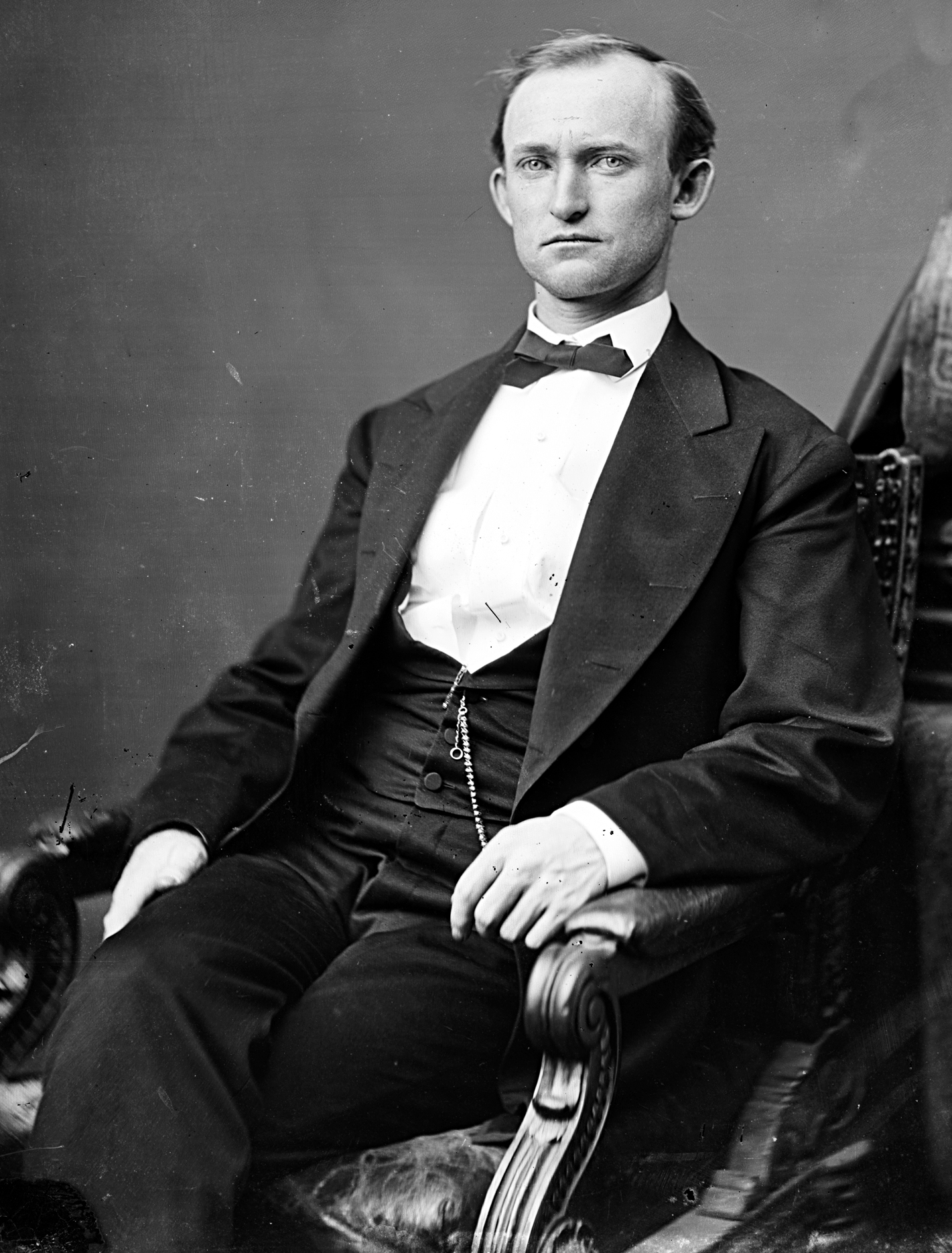
- Conner, 1860–1873

Member of the U.S. House of Representatives from Texas's 2nd district
- In office March 31, 1870 – March 3, 1873
- Preceded by: Andrew J. Hamilton
- Succeeded by: William P. McLean

Personal details
- Born: John Coggswell Conner; October 14, 1842 Noblesville, Indiana, U.S.
- Died: December 10, 1873 (aged 31) Washington, D.C., U.S
- Party: Democratic
- Education: United States Naval Academy

Military service
- Allegiance: United States of America
- Branch/service: United States Navy
- Years of service: August 30, 1862–June 20, 1864; July 28, 1866–November 29, 1869
- Rank: Captain
- Unit: 63rd Regiment, Indiana Volunteer Infantry

John Coggswell Conner (October 14, 1842 – December 10, 1873) was a U.S. representative from Texas.

== Biography ==
Born in Noblesville, Indiana, Conner attended the Noblesville public schools and Wabash College, Crawfordsville, Indiana. He was admitted to the United States Naval Academy, Annapolis, Maryland, September 20, 1861, and remained during the academic year from 1861 to 1862. Commissioned a second lieutenant in the Sixty-third Regiment, Indiana Volunteer Infantry, on August 30, 1862, and a first lieutenant on September 3, 1862. Honorably discharged June 20, 1864. He was an unsuccessful candidate for the Indiana House of Representatives election in 1866. He was commissioned a captain in the Forty-first Regiment, United States Infantry, on July 28, 1866, and served in Texas until November 29, 1869, when he resigned, having received the nomination for Congress. Upon the readmission of Texas to representation was elected as a Democrat to the Forty-first Congress. He was re-elected to the Forty-second Congress and served from March 31, 1870, to March 3, 1873. As his health was declining, he was not a candidate for renomination in 1872. He died in Washington, D.C., December 10, 1873, and was interred in the Old Cemetery, Noblesville, Indiana.

== Sources ==
- United States Congress. "John C. Conner (id: C000691)". Biographical Directory of the United States Congress.

U.S. House of Representatives
Preceded by Civil War	Member of the U.S. House of Representatives from Texas's 2nd congressional district March 30, 1870 – March 3, 1873	Succeeded by William P. McLean
