= Isaac F. Shepard =

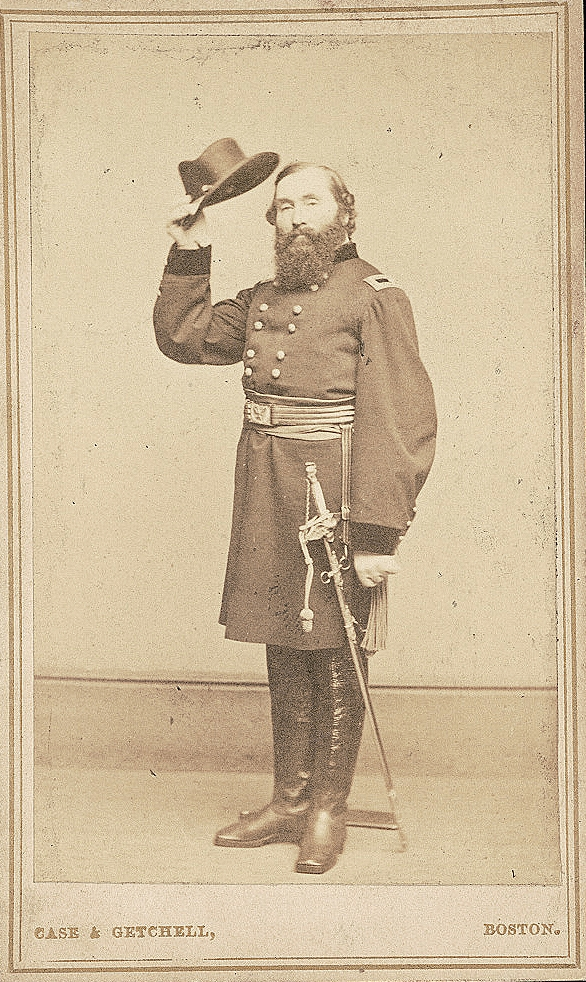
- Born: Isaac Fitzgerald Shepard; July 7, 1816; Natick, Massachusetts, U.S.
- Died: August 25, 1899 (aged 83); Bellingham, Massachusetts, U.S.
- Burial place: Ashland Cemetery
- Military career
- Allegiance: United States
- Branch: Union Army
- Rank: Colonel; Brigadier General (unconfirmed)
- Commands: 3rd Missouri Infantry Regiment; 51st U.S. Colored Infantry Regiment; African Brigade, XVII Corps; Adjutant General, Missouri Militia
- Conflicts: American Civil War: Battle of Wilson's Creek
- Other work: diplomat, author

Isaac Fitzgerald Shepard (July 7, 1816 – August 25, 1899) was a colonel in the Union Army during the American Civil War. His appointment as a brigadier general of volunteers was not confirmed by the United States Senate and expired on July 4, 1864.

== Biography ==
Shepard was born in Natick, Massachusetts, on July 7, 1816. He graduated from Harvard University in 1842.

Shepard was appointed a major in the Missouri Militia (Union) on June 18, 1861. In August 1861, he became an assistant adjutant general to Brigadier General Nathaniel Lyon. He was wounded at the Battle of Wilson's Creek on August 10, 1861. He was appointed lieutenant colonel of the 19th Missouri Infantry Regiment on August 30, 1861, and colonel of the 3rd Missouri Infantry Regiment on January 18, 1862, when the regiments were consolidated. He was appointed colonel of the 51st United States Colored Infantry Regiment on May 9, 1863. As a colonel he led the African Brigade, XVII Corps, Army of the Tennessee, during the Siege of Vicksburg.

On November 17, 1863, Shepard was appointed brigadier general of volunteers, to rank from October 27, 1863. He was stationed at Vicksburg, Mississippi, with a brigade of three regiments of United States Colored Troops. The United States Senate did not confirm his appointment as brigadier general and it expired on July 4, 1864. Shepard then returned to Missouri.

Shepard died on August 25, 1889, in Bellingham, Massachusetts. He was buried in Ashland Cemetery, Middlesex County, Massachusetts.

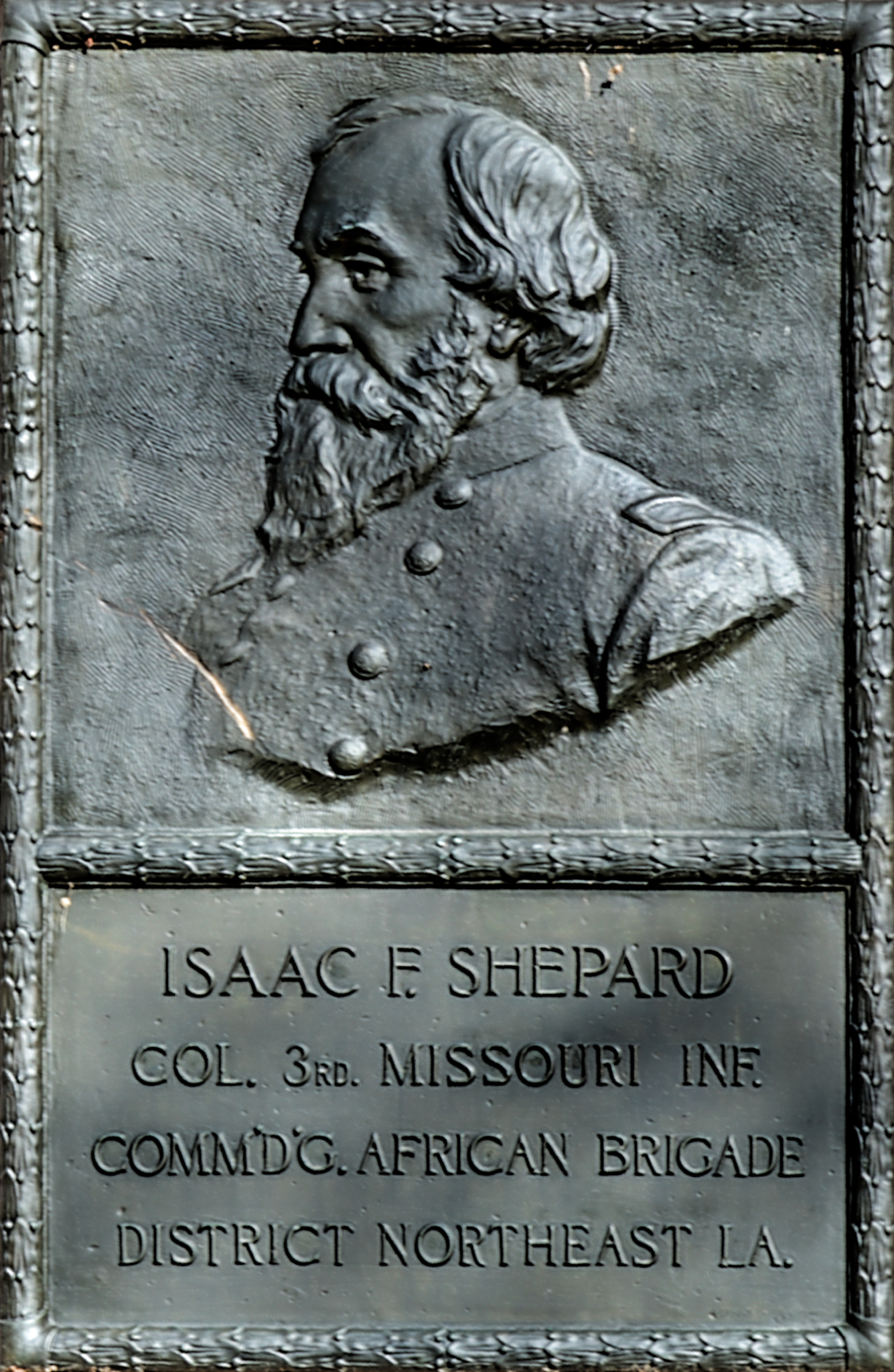
Relief portrait of Shepard by Roland Hinton Perry at Vicksburg National Military Park

== See also ==
- List of American Civil War generals (Union)
