= 48th United States Colored Infantry Regiment =

- Active: 1864–1866
- Country: United States of America
- Branch: Union Army; US Colored Troops
- Type: Infantry
- Engagements: American Civil War: Battle of Fort Blakeley

The 48th United States Colored Infantry Regiment was a unit of African-American troops recruited from Louisiana that served in the Union Army during the American Civil War. Originally formed as the 10th Louisiana Colored Infantry Regiment, the 48th Colored Infantry fought in the Gulf Coast region before being assigned to guard the Texas-Mexico border after the war.

== Predecessor unit ==
The regiment was originally known as the 10th Louisiana Infantry (African Descent), which was organized at Lake Providence and Goodrich Landing, Louisiana, between May 6 and August 8, 1863. In early June, the 10th Louisiana fought at the Battle of Milliken's Bend, which was one of the earliest battles involving Black Union soldiers. Following garrison duty along the Mississippi River and a support role during Colonel James Henry Coates' 1864 Yazoo River Expedition, the name of the regiment was changed to the 48th US Colored Infantry on March 11, 1864.

== Service ==
In April, 1865, the 48th Colored Infantry was dispatched to Mobile Bay, Alabama, to join the brigade of Colonel Charles Drew as Union forces were preparing to attack Fort Blakeley. Mobile was one of the last large cities still in Confederate hands, and the bay was guarded by numerous forts. As the Union troops moved into position to besiege the fort, an artillery shell exploded among the men of the 48th Infantry, resulting in 15 casualties. The regiment then joined in the final assault on the Confederate fortifications on April 9, which led to the fort's surrender. Fort Blakeley was one of the final battles of the Civil War, as Confederate General Robert E. Lee's forces in Virginia had surrendered the same day.

Following the end of the war, the 48th Infantry was sent to Texas to guard the Rio Grande valley. In total during the course of the war, the regiment lost 3 officers and 59 enlisted men killed in battle or mortally wounded, and 1 officer and 464 enlisted men killed by disease. Overall in the final year of the war, the incidence of diseases caused by poor sanitary conditions such as dysentery was 36% higher in Colored Troops regiments than in white units, and Black troops were 25% more likely to die from such diseases.

The regiment was mustered out of service on January 4, 1866.

== Commanding officers ==
Commanding officers of the 48th Colored Infantry:

- Colonel Frederick M. Crandal, awarded brevet Brigadier General, 1865.
- Lieutenant Colonel Moses H. Crowell

== See also ==
- List of United States Colored Troops Civil War units
