= 17th Texas Infantry Regiment =

- Regimental flag
- Active: February 1862 – June 1865
- Country: Confederate States of America
- Allegiance: Confederate States of America, Texas
- Branch: Confederate States Army
- Type: Infantry
- Size: Regiment
- Motto: Trust In God
- Engagements: American Civil War; Battle of Milliken's Bend (1863); Battle of Fort DeRussy (1864); Battle of Mansfield (1864); Battle of Pleasant Hill (1864); Battle of Jenkins' Ferry (1864)

Commanders
- Notable commanders: Robert T. P. Allen; George Washington Jones

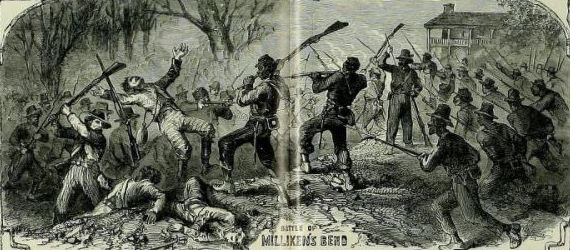
The regiment lost 21 killed, 65 wounded, and 3 missing at the Battle of Milliken's Bend in June 1863.

The 17th Texas Infantry Regiment was a unit of volunteers recruited in Texas that fought in the Confederate States Army during the American Civil War. The regiment organized in March 1862 with West Point graduate Robert T. P. Allen as it first colonel. It spent its entire existence west of the Mississippi River in the Trans-Mississippi Department. After marching to Arkansas in August 1862, the regiment spent the winter at Camp Nelson where a large number of men died from disease. In fall 1862, the unit was assigned to the 3rd Brigade of the Texas infantry division later known as Walker's Greyhounds. The regiment fought at Milliken's Bend in June 1863. George Washington Jones assumed command of the regiment in November 1863. The unit was in action at Fort DeRussy, Mansfield, Pleasant Hill, and Jenkins' Ferry in 1864. The regiment marched to Texas and surrendered in June 1865.
