= James Francis Miller =

American politician

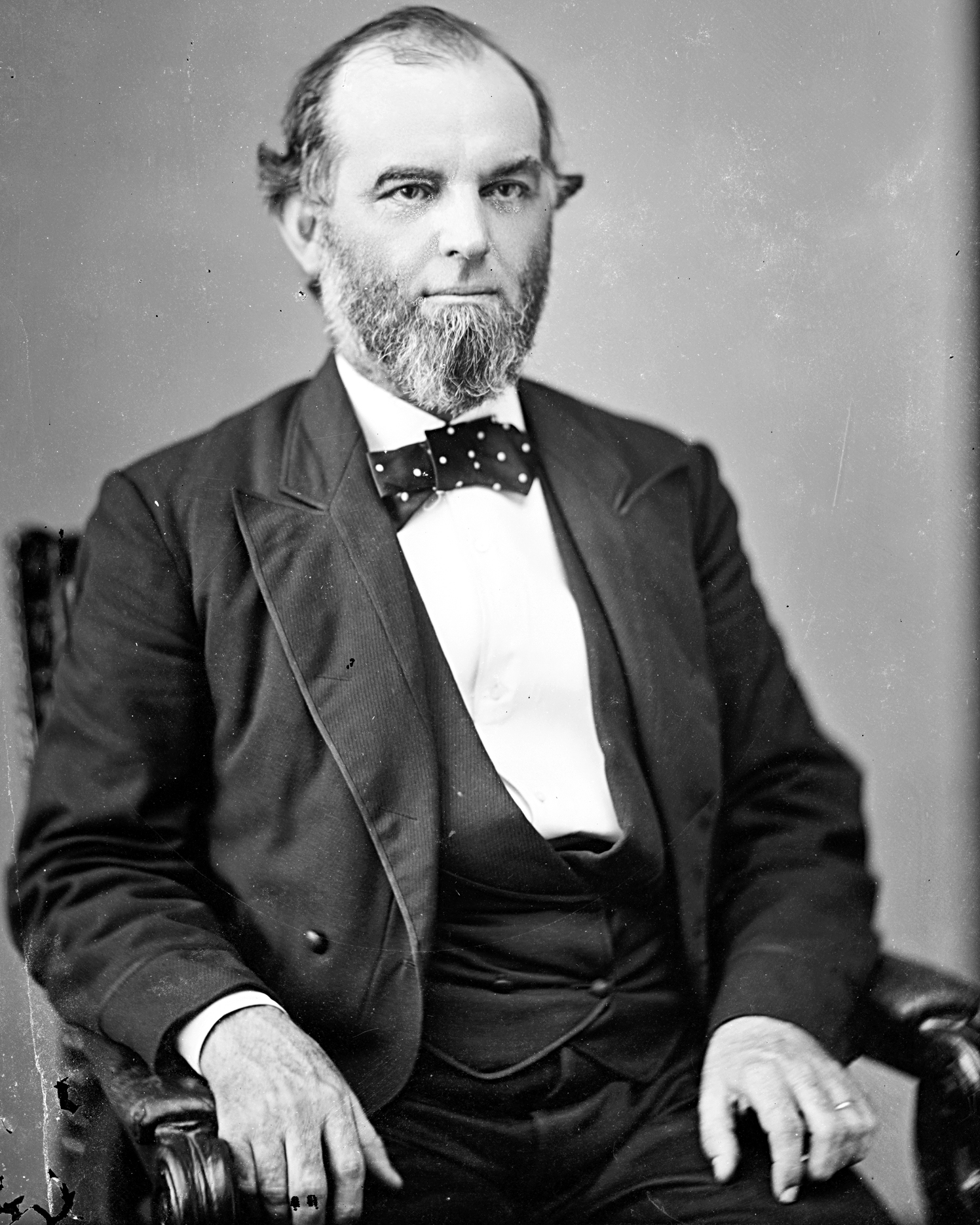
- Born: August 1, 1830
- Died: June 3, 1902 (aged 71)
- Military career
- Unit: Eighth Texas Cavalry
- Conflicts: American Civil War
- Other work: Politician

James Francis Miller (August 1, 1830 – July 3, 1902) was an American politician who represented Texas in the United States House of Representatives from 1883–1886.

Miller was born in Winnsboro, South Carolina. He moved with his parents to Texas in 1842 where he attended public schools and Reutersville College. He studied law, was admitted to the bar in 1857, and commenced practice in Gonzales, Texas.

During the American Civil War, Miller enlisted as a private in Company I, Eighth Texas Cavalry, better known as "Terry's Texas Rangers," and served throughout the Civil War. After the war, he resumed the practice of law in Gonzales, Texas. In addition, he also engaged in banking and stock raising.

Miller was elected as a Democrat to the Forty-eighth and Forty-ninth Congresses (March 4, 1883 – March 3, 1887). In Congress, he served as chairman, Committee on Banking and Currency (Forty-ninth Congress). He declined renomination to the Fiftieth Congress. After leaving Congress, he resumed former pursuits. He was elected as first president of the Texas Bankers' Association in 1885. He died in Gonzales, Texas in 1902 and is buried in Masonic Cemetery.

U.S. House of Representatives
Preceded by District created	Member of the U.S. House of Representatives from Texas's 8th congressional district 1883–1887	Succeeded by Littleton W. Moore
