= USS Ramsay =

Wickes-class destroyer

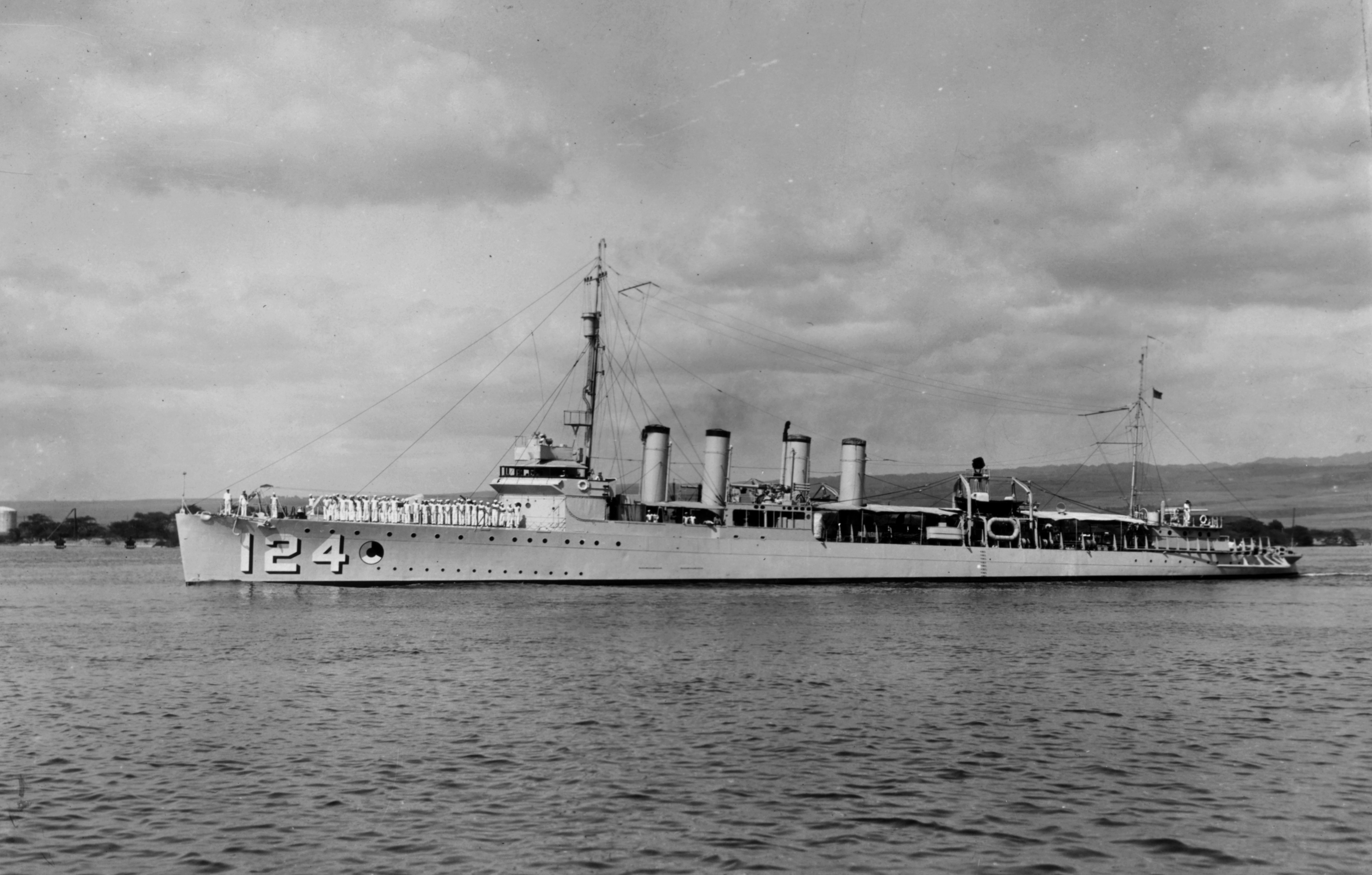
- USS Ramsay underway

History

United States
- Name: Ramsay
- Namesake: Francis Munroe Ramsay
- Builder: Newport News Shipbuilding & Dry Dock Company, Newport News, Virginia
- Laid down: 21 December 1917
- Launched: 8 June 1918
- Commissioned: 15 February 1919
- Decommissioned: 30 June 1922
- Identification: DD-124
- Recommissioned: 2 June 1930
- Decommissioned: 14 December 1937
- Reclassified: DM-16 on 13 June 1930
- Recommissioned: 25 September 1939
- Decommissioned: 19 October 1945
- Reclassified: AG-98, 5 June 1945
- Stricken: 13 November 1945
- Fate: Sold for scrapping, 21 November 1946

General characteristics
- Class & type: Wickes-class destroyer
- Displacement: 1,060 tons
- Length: 314 ft 5 in (95.8 m)
- Beam: 31 ft 0 in (9.4 m)
- Draft: 10 ft 3 in (3.1 m)
- Speed: 35 knots (65 km/h)
- Complement: 133 officers and enlisted
- Armament: 4 × 4 in (102 mm)/50 guns; 2 × 3 in (76 mm)/23 guns; 12 × 21 in (533 mm) torpedo tubes

USS Ramsay (DD-124) was a Wickes-class destroyer in the United States Navy during World War I, reclassified as DM-16 during World War II and again reclassified as AG-98. She was the first ship named for Rear Admiral Francis Ramsay.

== Construction and commissioning ==
Ramsay was laid down on 21 December 1917 by the Newport News Shipbuilding & Dry Dock Company, Newport News, Virginia. The ship was launched on 8 June 1918, sponsored by Miss Mary Virginia Ramsay, granddaughter of Rear Admiral Ramsay. The destroyer was commissioned on 15 February 1919.

== Service history ==
Assigned to Division 12, Destroyer Force, Atlantic Fleet, Ramsay completed shakedown training off Cuba in March, participated in fleet maneuvers in early April, and then sailed for New York City. She got underway in May for the Azores to act as a guide and weather observer for the NC transatlantic flights. Steaming between the Azores and Portugal from 16 May to 25 May, she returned to the United States on 6 June. For the next month she conducted tactical exercises along the East Coast and, on 6 July, put into Norfolk to prepare for transfer to the Pacific.

Ramsay arrived at San Diego on 7 August and, after overhaul at Mare Island Naval Shipyard, commenced two years of operations with Destroyer Force, Pacific. On 17 July 1920 she was designated DD-124. In early 1922, she prepared for inactivation and, on 30 June 1922, she was decommissioned and berthed at San Diego as a unit of the Reserve Fleet. Recommissioned eight years later, on 2 June 1930, she was reclassified as a light minelayer, redesignated DM-16 on 13 June, and homeported at Pearl Harbor. Converted at the Navy Yard there, she operated with Minecraft, Battle Force, primarily in the Hawaiian area until 1937 when she returned to San Diego for her second inactivation and was decommissioned on 14 December 1937. Recommissioned on 25 September 1939, she joined MinDiv 5, Minecraft, Battle Force, and for the next year conducted patrols engaged in gunnery drills and landing exercises, and trained naval reservists along the Pacific coast.

=== World War II ===
On 10 December 1940, Ramsay returned to Pearl Harbor and, throughout the next year, operated with Mine Divisions 5 and 2. Moored at Pearl Harbor on the morning of 7 December 1941, she fired her guns in combat for the first time at carrier-based planes delivering Japan's declaration of war on the United States.

Underway from the harbor before 0900, for offshore patrol, Ramsay made sound contact with a submarine at 1120. She released ten depth charges, and then watched an oil slick spread over the attack area. She had damaged, and possibly had sunk one of the midget submarines used by the Japanese in the attack. Eight days later, while escorting a merchant ship off Kauai, she made her second contact. During two runs over the enemy, she dropped her depth charges and again was rewarded by the appearance of an oil slick on the surface indicating damage to her quarry.

Into February 1942, Ramsay continued patrol escort services in the Hawaiian area. On 22 February, she got underway with TF 19 for Samoa. Arriving Pago Pago on 4 March, she planted defensive minefields off Tutuila and Apia, then shifted to Suva for mining activities among the Fiji Islands. On 3 May she steamed out of Suva for the New Hebrides and by 11 June had completed, with Montgomery, the Efate defensive minefields. The next day, she cleared Vila harbor, and returned to Pearl Harbor on 3 July.

For the next two months, she again performed escort and patrol assignments in the Hawaiian Islands. Then, on 14 September, she sailed for the Aleutians. Still with Montgomery, she arrived at Adak on 22 September and three days later resumed mineplanting activities. In November she returned to California; underwent overhaul at Hunters Point; and on 13 January 1943 arrived back in the Aleutians for nine months of escort and patrol duty from Unalaska in the east to Attu in the west.

On 17 September, Ramsay sailed south. Steaming via Pearl Harbor, she put into San Francisco on 4 October for another overhaul. Out of the shipyard by 20 December, she sailed west on 24 December. She joined ServRon 6 at Pearl Harbor on 2 January 1944, and on 21 January headed for the Gilberts. After a brief stop at Tarawa, she rendezvoused with TG 50.15 on 30 January and screened the cruiser Pensacola during the bombardment of Wotje that afternoon. The next day, she guarded the cruiser Chester during shelling, and, on 2 February, she arrived at Majuro, where she conducted antisubmarine patrols until 14 March. An escort run to the Gilberts followed, and on 19 February she got underway to return to Pearl Harbor. Arriving on 27 February, she was assigned convoy escort duty. Between then and mid-September, she shepherded ships to Majuro, San Francisco and Eniwetok. In October, she served with the Submarine Training Force and, in November, returned to the Marshalls for escort and training duty off Majuro.

With the new year, 1945, Ramsay headed east and during February again worked with the Submarine Training Force. At the end of the month, she sailed for San Pedro, where, after overhaul, she was designated a miscellaneous auxiliary and was reclassified AG-98, effective 5 June. On 15 June, she once more got underway for Pearl Harbor, and for the next three months, she served as plane guard for aircraft carriers training in Hawaiian waters. On 24 September, she arrived back at San Pedro to await her third, and final, inactivation. She was decommissioned on 19 October 1945, struck from the Navy list on 13 November 1945; and sold for scrapping on 21 November 1946.

== Awards ==
Ramsay earned three battle stars during World War II.
