= Littleton W. Moore =

American politician and lawyer (1835–1911)

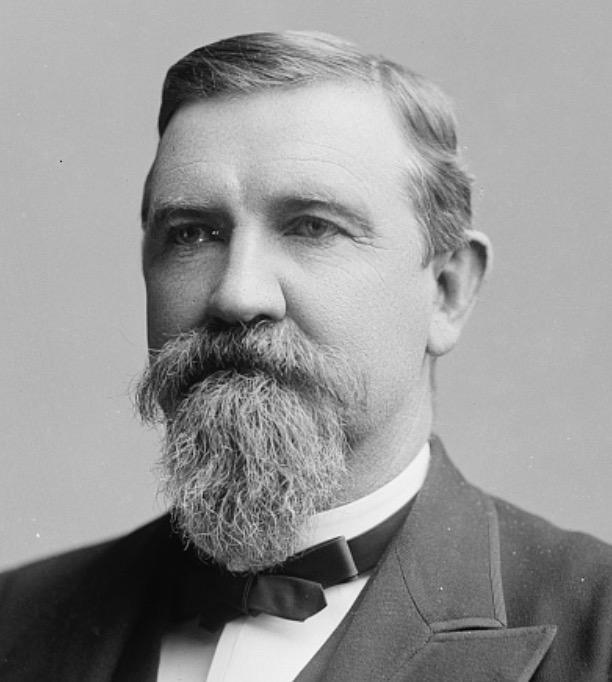
- Portrait of Moore by Charles Milton Bell, taken between 1873 and 1890

Member of the U.S. House of Representatives from Texas's 8th district
- In office March 4, 1887 – March 3, 1893
- Preceded by: James F. Miller
- Succeeded by: Charles K. Bell

Personal details
- Born: Littleton Wilde Moore; March 25, 1835 Marion County, Alabama, US
- Died: October 29, 1911 (aged 76) La Grange, Texas, US
- Party: Democratic
- Occupation: Politician, lawyer

Military service
- Allegiance: Confederate States of America
- Branch/service: Confederate States Army
- Rank: Captain
- Unit: 16th Texas Infantry Regiment
- Battles/wars: American Civil War

Littleton Wilde Moore (March 25, 1835 – October 29, 1911) was an American politician and lawyer. A Democrat, he was a member of the United States House of Representatives from Texas between 1887 and 1893, representing the 8th district.

== Biography ==
Moore was born on March 25, 1835, in Marion County, Alabama, the son of James Moore and Abigail (née Woods) Moore. In 1836, he and his family moved to Mississippi. He graduated from the University of Mississippi in 1855, as valedictorian, with a Bachelor of Arts.

Moore read law, being admitted to the bar in 1857. Also in 1857, he moved to Bastrop, Texas, where he began practicing law. During the American Civil War, he served as a captain in the 16th Texas Infantry Regiment of the Confederate States Army. In 1865, he returned to practicing law, and from 1885 to 1897, was in a partnership with J. T. Duncan.

Moore was a Democrat. He was a delegate to the Texas Constitutional Convention of 1875. From 1876 to 1885, he was a district judge. He was a member of the United States House of Representatives, from March 4, 1887, to March 3, 1893, representing Texas's 8th district. Ideologically, he was liberal.

After serving in Congress, Moore returned to practicing law. He was judge of the Texas 22nd District Court, from March 1901 until his death, having been appointed by Governor Joseph D. Sayers. He was married to Anna Dunn Wright. He died on October 29, 1911, aged 76, in La Grange, and was buried at the La Grange City Cemetery. An archive of his papers is unrealized.

U.S. House of Representatives
Preceded by James F. Miller	Member of the U.S. House of Representatives from Texas's 8th congressional district 1887–1893	Succeeded by Charles K. Bell
