= Richard Waterhouse (general) =

Confederate Army general (1832–1876)

Richard Waterhouse, Jr.
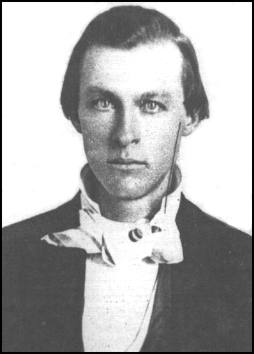
- Richard Waterhouse
- Born: January 12, 1832; Rhea County, Tennessee, U.S.
- Died: March 20, 1876 (aged 44); Waco, Texas, U.S.
- Burial place: Oakwood Cemetery (Jefferson, Texas)
- Military career
- Allegiance: United States; Confederate States of America
- Branch: United States Army; Confederate States Army
- Service years: 1862–1865 (CSA)
- Rank: Brigadier General (CSA)
- Commands: 19th Texas Infantry Regiment; Waterhouse's Brigade; 3rd Brigade, Texas Division
- Conflicts: Mexican–American War; American Civil War: Battle of Milliken's Bend; Red River Campaign; Battle of Mansfield; Battle of Pleasant Hill
- Other work: merchant, land speculator

Richard Waterhouse (January 12, 1832 – March 20, 1876) was a Confederate brigadier general during the American Civil War.

== Early life ==
Waterhouse was born in Rhea County, Tennessee. As a teenager, he ran away from home to fight in the Mexican–American War. After he returned, he and his parents moved to San Augustine, Texas in 1849. There he engaged in the mercantile business until the outbreak of the American Civil War.

== Civil War service ==
During the Civil War, he helped to raise the 19th Texas Infantry Regiment in and around Jefferson and was elected colonel of the unit on May 13, 1862. He served under Thomas C. Hindman and Theophilus H. Holmes in Arkansas and under Richard Taylor in Louisiana.

At Milliken's Bend, Louisiana, on August 18, 1862, he won high commendations from Henry Eustace McCulloch for leading a determined charge against Federal troops within artillery range of Union gunboats. McCulloch reported, "not only by a gallant and desperate charge over the levee" but by driving the enemy "to the very brink of the river and within short and direct range of the gunboats of the enemy." After transfer to William R. Scurry's brigade, he fought at Mansfield and Pleasant Hill during the Red River Campaign in spring 1864.

General E. Kirby Smith, who was commanding the Trans-Mississippi Department, was impressed with Waterhouse and he appointed Waterhouse Brigadier General to rank from April 30, 1864. The promotion was not confirmed by Confederate President Jefferson Davis until March 17, 1865 and by the Confederate Senate until the 18th, the last day the legislators were in session before the government collapsed.

== Postbellum ==
After the war, Waterhouse lived in San Antonio and in Jefferson, Texas, where he speculated in land. He fell down a flight of stairs in a Waco hotel on March 18, 1876. This resulted in a severe case of pneumonia that resulted in his death only two days later on March 20. He is buried in Jefferson, Texas.

== See also ==
- List of American Civil War generals (Confederate)
