= 23rd Iowa Infantry Regiment =

- Iowa state flag
- Active: September 19, 1862, to July 26, 1865
- Country: United States
- Allegiance: Union
- Branch: Infantry
- Engagements: Battle of Port Gibson; Battle of Champion's Hill; Battle of Big Black River Bridge; Siege of Vicksburg; Assault on Fort Blakeley

The 23rd Iowa Infantry Regiment was an infantry regiment that served in the Union Army during the American Civil War.

== Service ==
Assignment	From	To	Activity
Mustered	September 19, 1862	N/A	961 Officers and men at muster.
2nd Brigade, 2nd Division, Army of the Southwest, Department of the Missouri	February 1863	March 1863	Duty at Camp Patterson and West Plains, Missouri; Marched through Thomasville and Eminence to Iron Mountain (February 9–26); Duty at Iron Mountain until March 9.
2nd Brigade, 14th Division, 13th Army Corps, Department of the Tennessee	March 1863	July 1863	Marched to Ste. Genevieve (March 9–12); Marched to Milliken's Bend, Louisiana (March 22–27); Duty at Milliken's Bend until April 25.; Moved on Bruinsburg; Anderson's Hill (April 30); Battle of Port Gibson (May 1–3); Battle of Champion Hill (May 16); Battle of Big Black River Bridge (May 17); A Prisoner of war guard detachment from the brigade reinforced garrison at Milliken's Bend (June 5); Battle of Milliken's Bend (June 6–7); Siege of Vicksburg (May 18-July 4)
2nd Brigade, 1st Division, 13th Army Corps, Department of the Tennessee	July 1863	August 1863	Unknown activity
1st Brigade, 1st Division, 13th Army Corps, Department of the Gulf	August 1863	June 1863	Ordered to the Department of the Gulf (August 13); Duty at Carrollton, Brashear City, and Berwick until October 3
1st Brigade, 3rd Division, 19th Army Corps, Department of the Gulf	June 1863	August 1864	Duty at Carrollton, Brashear City, and Berwick until October 3; Expedition to New Iberia, Louisiana (October 3-November 17); Expedition to Vermilion Bayou (October 8–30); Marched to Brazos Santiago, Texas (November 17–23); Marched to Fort Esperanza, Texas (November 27–30); Duty at Indianola, Texas until March 1864; Duty at Matagorda Island, Texas until May 4, 1864; Marched to New Orleans, Louisiana and joined the Red River Campaign (May 4–15); Retreat to Morganza, Louisiana until October 1864
4th Brigade, 2nd Division, 19th Army Corps, Department of the Gulf	August 1864	January 1865	Duty at Simmesport, Louisiana until October 6; Moved to Duvalls Bluff on October 12; Duty in Arkansas until January 1865
4th Brigade, 1st Division; Reserve Corps, Military Division of the Mississippi	January 1865	July 1865	Marched to New Orleans, Louisiana; Marched to Fort Barrancas, Florida on February 17; Mobile, Alabama campaign (March - April); Battle of Fort Blakeley; Marched to Columbus, Ohio until July
Disbanded	N/A	July 1865	Duty complete on July 26, 1865

== Battle of Champion's Hill ==
On May 16, 1863, attached to General Carr's Fourteenth Division, the regiment was in reserve almost the entire battle. Near the end of the battle, the 23rd was ordered to pursue the retreating Confederate army. The regiment succeeded in capturing multiple prisoners, as well as large quantities of stores from the retreating army. The command to pursue, however, was given too late for General Carr to successfully cut the rebels off from making their escape, which enabled many of the remaining Confederates to mass at the Big Black River despite the assistance of the 23rd and other regiments. These escaped soldiers would bolster some of the Confederate forces during the engagement the following day at the Battle of Big Black River Bridge.

== Battle of Big Black River Bridge ==
During the Vicksburg Campaign, the 23rd Iowa Regiment served under Brigadier General M. K. Lawler's Brigade of Brigadier General Eugene Asa Carr Division. After the Battle of Champion's Hill, Major General John McClernand's corps chased the remaining confederates towards Vicksburg. On May 17, 1863, they arrived at the rebel defenses in front of the Big Black River. This was a strong position in command of the field of battle. Brigadier General Lawler's Second Brigade, containing the 21st, 22nd, 23rd Iowa, and 11th Wisconsin regiments, was first on the scene and positioned at the far right of the line, an excellent position to launch an attack. The distance between their position and the rebel entrenchments was very short. Once it was known that they were to make an assault, the 23rd's own Colonel William Kinsman, volunteered to lead the charge.

The 21st and 23rd Iowa regiments led the charge, while the 22nd Iowa and 11th Wisconsin lined up in support. With a cheer, the attack began. Kinsman went down very early in the charge. "[Kinsman] Struggling to his feet, he staggered a few paces to the front, cheered forward his men, and fell again." Kinsman was fatally wounded by a musket ball that went through his lung. General Grant recalled the moment of victory: "I heard great cheering to the right of our line and, looking in that direction, saw Lawler in his shirt sleeves leading a charge upon the enemy. I immediately mounted my horse and rode in the direction of the charge." The Rebels, already torn and tattered from their loss at Champion Hill, fled their cover and either retreated or surrendered. The 23rd Iowa suffered over half of the Union casualties in the battle, yet their entire charge lasted a mere three minutes. The unit was remarkably weakened after the engagement. When they were put in charge of the prisoners captured in the battle, they sent them up to Memphis. General Lawler said that if the war ended that day, their regiment would surely be one of the most distinguished in the entirety of the war.

== Total strength and casualties ==
A total of 1,070 men served in the 23rd Iowa Volunteer Infantry Regiment during the course of its existence. It suffered losses of 6 officers and 69 enlisted men who were killed in action or who died of their wounds, and one officer and 208 enlisted men who died of disease, for a total of 284 fatalities.

== Commanders ==
- Colonel William Dewey
- Colonel William H. Kinsman
- Colonel Samuel Lyle Glasgow

== See also ==
- List of Iowa Civil War Units
- Iowa in the American Civil War
