= 19th Texas Infantry Regiment =

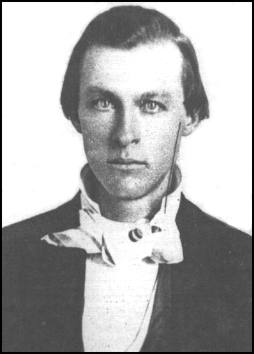
- Richard Waterhouse was colonel of the 19th Texas.
- Active: February 1862 – June 1865
- Country: Confederate States of America
- Allegiance: Confederate States of America, Texas
- Branch: Confederate States Army
- Type: Infantry
- Size: Regiment
- Engagements: American Civil War; Battle of Milliken's Bend (1863); Battle of Mansfield (1864); Battle of Pleasant Hill (1864); Battle of Jenkins' Ferry (1864)

Commanders
- Notable commanders: Richard Waterhouse

The 19th Texas Infantry Regiment was a unit of volunteers recruited in Texas that fought in the Confederate States Army during the American Civil War. The regiment began organizing in February 1862 and elected its officers in May 1862. It spent its entire existence west of the Mississippi River in the Trans-Mississippi Department. In fall 1862, the unit was assigned to the 3rd Brigade of the Texas infantry division known as Walker's Greyhounds and fought at Milliken's Bend in June 1863. The unit was in action at Mansfield, Pleasant Hill, and Jenkins' Ferry in 1864. The last units in the Trans-Mississippi surrendered in June 1865, but the 19th Regiment had already disbanded before that date.
