= USS Choctaw (1856) =

Union gunboat and ram

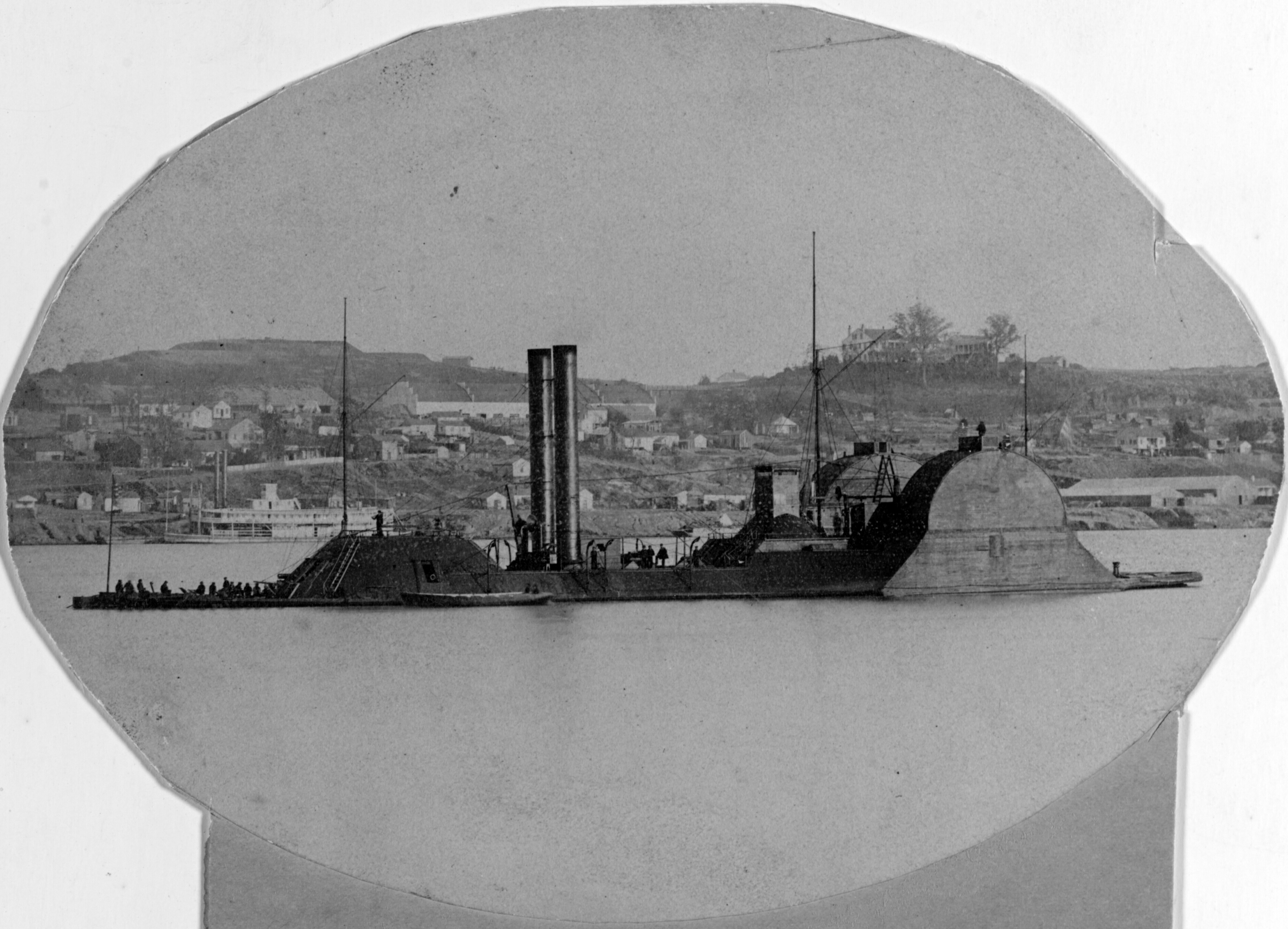
- USS Choctaw off Vicksburg

History

United States
- Laid down: 1853
- Launched: 1856
- Commissioned: 23 March 1863
- Decommissioned: 22 July 1865
- Fate: Sold, 28 March 1866

General characteristics
- Displacement: 1,004 long tons (1,020 t)
- Length: 260 ft (79 m)
- Beam: 45 ft (14 m)
- Draft: 8 ft (2.4 m)
- Propulsion: steam engine; side wheel-propelled
- Speed: 2 knots (4 km/h) upstream
- Complement: 106 officers and men
- Armament: 1 × 100 pounder (45 kg) rifle; 3 × 9 in (229 mm) smoothbore cannon; 2 × 30 pounder (14 kg) rifles

USS Choctaw was a large (1,004-ton) steamer built for the merchant service and acquired by the Union Navy during the second year of the American Civil War.

Choctaw, with her crew of 106, was outfitted by the Navy as a ram with heavy rifled guns and was used both as a gunboat and as a ram on the rivers of the Confederate States of America.

== Service history ==
Choctaw, a sidewheel steamer, was the first ship of the United States Navy to be named for the Choctaw Indian tribe, formerly of Alabama and Mississippi, now resident in Oklahoma. She was built for the merchant service; her keel was laid down at New Albany, Indiana in 1853. She was launched in 1856. She was purchased by the United States Army on September 27, 1862, and converted into an ironclad ram by Edward Hartt, then transferred to commissioned into the United States Navy at St. Louis, Missouri on March 23, 1863, with Lieutenant Commander Francis M. Ramsay in command.

From April 23, 1863, until the end of the war, Choctaw operated in the Mississippi River and its tributaries. Between April 29 and May 1, 1863, she stood up the Yazoo River for a feigned attack on Haynes' Bluff, Mississippi, designed to prevent the Confederates from reinforcing Grand Gulf. During this action, she was struck 53 times. Remaining in the Yazoo, she took part in attacks with the Union Army which led to the destruction of Confederate works at Haynes' Bluff and the burning of the navy yard and ships at Yazoo City, during May 18–23.

On June 6 and 7, she helped to repel a Confederate attack at Milliken's Bend, Louisiana, after which she rescued a large number of Confederates from the river and sent them in as prisoners. During the Red River Campaign, the USS Choctaw played an important role in the Capture of Fort DeRussy. Between March 7 and May 15, she participated in the naval operations that helped secure Union control of the Red River by providing artillery support in coordination with General A.J. Smith's land forces during the assault. Her presence helped the swift fall of the fort after a four-hour siege, setting an early victory in the campaign. Choctaw arrived at Algiers, Louisiana, on July 20, 1865, and was decommissioned on July 22, 1865. She was sold at New Orleans, Louisiana on March 28, 1866.
