= 51st United States Colored Infantry Regiment =

- Active: 1863–1866
- Country: United States
- Allegiance: United States Union
- Branch: Infantry; United States Colored Troops
- Size: Regiment
- Battles: American Civil War: Battle of Milliken's Bend; Battle of Fort Blakeley

Commanders
- Notable commanders: Isaac F. Shepard

The 51st United States Colored Infantry Regiment was an infantry regiment composed of African-American troops recruited from Mississippi that served in the Union Army during the American Civil War. Initially formed in the spring of 1863 as the 1st Regiment Mississippi Volunteer Infantry (African Descent), the Regiment took part in fierce fighting at the Battle of Milliken's Bend, served on garrison duty in Louisiana, and then took part in the Battle of Fort Blakeley, the last major battle of the war.

== Formation and Milliken's Bend ==
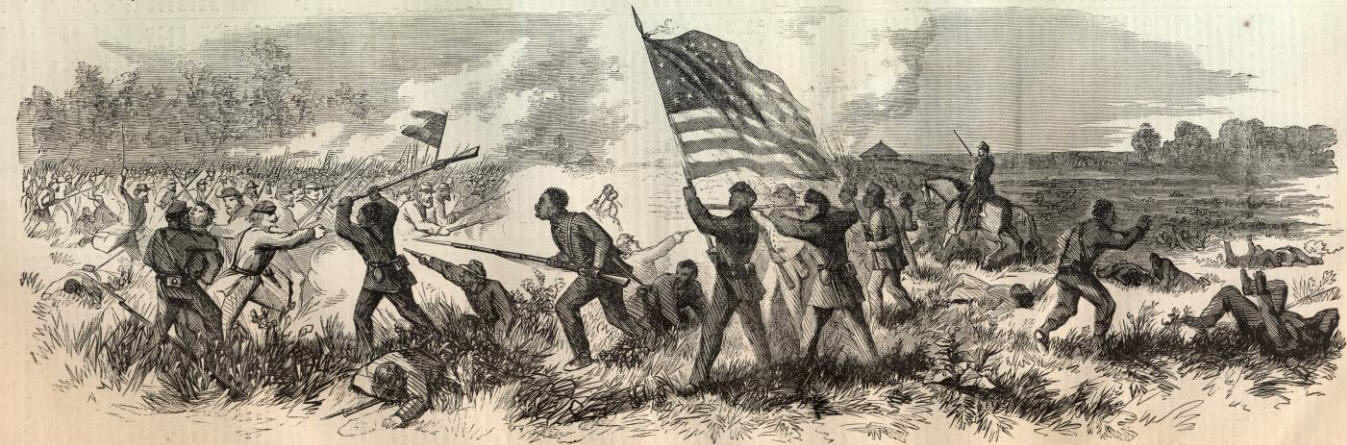
Black soldiers fighting at the Battle of Milliken's Bend

The Regiment was initially organized as the 1st Regiment Mississippi Volunteer Infantry (African Descent) on May 16, 1863 at Milliken's Bend, Louisiana. Most of the soldiers were former slaves from Mississippi who had fled to Union lines. The first Colonel of the Regiment was Isaac F. Shepard, who was in overall command of several regiments of newly-recruited Black troops stationed on the Louisiana side of the Mississippi River. On June 6, Confederate troops attacked the Union camp at Milliken's Bend in an attempt to cut off supply lines for Union General Ulysses S. Grant's troops who were besieging Vicksburg. In the subsequent Battle of Milliken's Bend, Black soldiers, many of them raw recruits, fought in vicious hand-to-hand combat with the attacking Confederates, suffering many casualties but obtaining a Union victory. The 1st Mississippi Regiment was still recruiting and not at full strength at the time of the battle, but about 150 men from the Regiment took part in the fighting on June 6. Colonel Shepard reported enthusiastically on the performance of the Black troops after the battle: "No one had ever held a musket three weeks before - some not 24 hours - untaught, [knowing] no command by which they could be moved in masses - and yet standing against disciplined troops till they left 103 dead [Confederate] bodies to be buried." The fighting at Milliken's Bend was one of the first major actions by Black troops in the Civil War, and the performance of the troops there helped gain acceptance for the large-scale enlistment of African-Americans into the Union Army.

Colonel Shepard was temporarily promoted to brigadier general in late 1863, Colonel A. Watson Webber then took command of the 1st Mississippi Regiment, (later renamed the 51st USCT Infantry Regiment) for the remainder of the war. All officers of the US Colored Troops during the Civil War were white; Black soldiers would not be commissioned as officers in the US Army until after the war.

== Massacre at Ross's Landing ==
In February 1864, the 1st Mississippi Regiment was dispatched to Ross's Landing in Chicot County, Arkansas on a foraging mission. A group of Confederate guerillas, the 9th Missouri Cavalry, unexpectedly ambushed the Union troops at a local plantation on February 14. The 1st Mississippi fired a volley at the Confederates, but they were unable to reload their weapons before the guerillas were upon them. 13 soldiers of the 1st Mississippi were killed, and 3 later died of their wounds. The Confederates desecrated the bodies of the Black soldiers by pinning them to the ground with the dead soldiers' own bayonets, and two white officers of the Regiment were summarily executed by the Confederates after surrendering. It was the official policy of the Confederates to execute captured white officers of the US Colored Troops, and many Black soldiers were killed after surrendering in other incidents such as the Battle of Olustee the same month as the killings at Ross's Landing, and the Fort Pillow massacre in April 1864. The incident at Ross's Landing is relatively unknown: there is no historical marker at the site, and the incident was not mentioned in the Official Records of the Union and Confederate Armies, but it was reported in Northern newspapers at the time.

== Louisiana 1864 ==
On March 11, 1864, the Regiment was renamed the 51st Infantry, US Colored Troops. Shortly afterwards, Col. Webber of the 51st was dispatched to establish army posts and scout the surrounding countryside at Goodrich's Landing and Lake Providence in East Carroll Parish, Louisiana. Webber was in command of several USCT regiments, including the 51st, assigned to guard the surrounding plantations against attacks by Confederate guerillas. For the remainder of 1864, the 51st Regiment was based at Goodrich's Landing and fought several skirmishes against Confederate raiding parties in Louisiana, Arkansas, and Mississippi. An inspection report of the 51st Regiment in August 1864, reported the following: "Aggregate effective force, 429. This regiment was in good order as to arms, equipment, clothing, and discipline. Instruction fair. Officers pretty good. Camp and police guard. Sanitary condition not bad."

== Battle of Fort Blakeley ==
In December 1864, the 51st left Louisiana and was assigned to garrison duty at Vicksburg, Mississippi. In February 1865, the Regiment was sent to Algiers, Louisiana and then to Pensacola, Florida. In late March, the 51st marched out of Pensacola towards Mobile, Alabama, one of the last large Southern cities still held by Confederate forces in the spring of 1865. Starting on April 2, Union forces laid siege to the Confederate-held Fort Blakely on the north side of Mobile bay. On April 9, the 51st Regiment was among Union troops that assaulted the fort, leading to a Confederate surrender. The capture of Fort Blakely effectively eliminated any remaining Confederate force along the Gulf Coast. Unbeknownst to the men fighting in Alabama, on the same day that they attacked the fort Confederate General Robert E. Lee's troops in Virginia had surrendered a few hours before: the fighting at Fort Blakely was the last major battle of the war.

After the battle, the colonel of the 47th Colored Infantry reported on the attack made by his men alongside the 51st Regiment: "The spirit and enthusiasm of the troops could not be excelled. Men actually wept that they were placed in reserve and could not go with their comrades into the thickest of the fight." Countering lingering racist expectations that Black troops were not suited for army service, Col. Watson reported on the performance of the soldiers of the 51st Regiment: "There can be no doubt now, in the minds of their officers at least, but that our colored soldiers are brave and will fight."

Following the battle, the 51st took part in the Union occupation of Mobile and Montgomery, Alabama, and was then sent to the Rio Grande in Texas. The Regiment was mustered out of service on June 16, 1866.

Combat casualties of the 51st Regiment: 3 killed, 21 wounded at Milliken's Bend, 13 killed, 7 wounded at Ross Landing, Arkansas, 1 killed, 19 wounded at Fort Blakely, Alabama.

== See also ==
- List of United States Colored Troops Civil War Units
- United States Colored Troops
- List of Mississippi Union Civil War units
