= 10th Louisiana Colored Infantry Regiment =

Infantry regiment of the Union Army

- Active: 1863–1864
- Country: United States
- Allegiance: Union
- Branch: Infantry
- Size: Regiment
- Engagements: American Civil War: Battle of Milliken's Bend

The 10th Louisiana Colored Infantry Regiment was a regiment in the Union Army during the American Civil War. It was composed primarily of freed or escaped slaves from Louisiana's plantations and was commanded by white officers. In March, 1864 the regiment was redesignated as the 48th United States Colored Infantry Regiment.

== Vicksburg Campaign ==
The 10th Louisiana was organized at Lake Providence and Goodrich Landing, Louisiana, between May 6 and August 8, 1863. In early June, the regiment fought at the Battle of Milliken's Bend, which was one of the earliest battles involving Black Union soldiers. Following the Union victories in the Vicksburg Campaign, the 10th Louisiana was attached to the Goodrich Landing post until January 1864, and at Vicksburg until March 1864.

== Yazoo River Expedition ==
The regiment participated in the Yazoo River Expedition between February and March, 1864. The 10th Louisiana was dispatched to support Union troops during a skirmish at Yazoo City on March 5, but they arrived too late to take part in that battle.

== 48th Regiment Infantry U.S. Colored Troops ==
The regiment was designated the 48th Regiment Infantry, U.S. Colored Troops on March 11, 1864. The 48th fought at the Battle of Fort Blakeley in April 1865, guarded the Texas-Mexico border after the war, and was mustered out of service on January 4, 1866.

== Commanding officers ==
Commanding officers of the 10th Louisiana Colored Infantry:

- Colonel Frederick M. Crandal
- Lieutenant Colonel Van Eps Young

== See also ==
- List of Louisiana Union Civil War units
