= 10th Illinois Cavalry Regiment =

- Flag of the United States (1863–1865)
- Active: 1861–1865
- Disbanded: November 22, 1865
- Country: United States (Union)
- Allegiance: Illinois
- Branch: Volunteers
- Type: Cavalry
- Size: Regiment
- Battles: American Civil War; Battle of Bayou Fourche

The 10th Regiment Illinois Volunteer Cavalry, known informally as "Lincoln's Own", was a cavalry regiment that served in the Union Army during the American Civil War.

== Service in the War ==
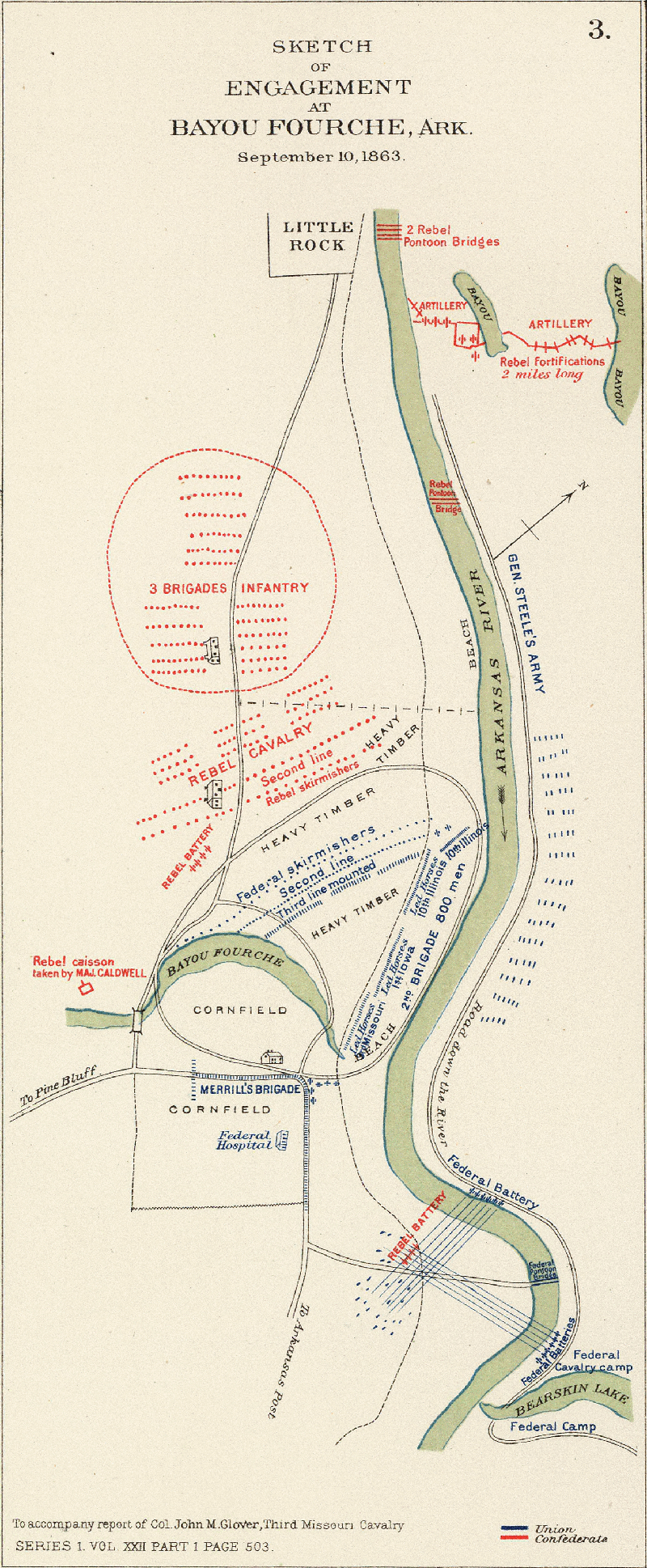
Sketch of Engagement at Bayou Fourche, Arkansas, September 10, 1863. To accompany report of Col. John M. Glover, Third Missouri Cavalry.

The 10th Illinois Cavalry was mustered in for 3 years' service at Camp Butler, Illinois on November 25, 1861. In January 1862, the regiment moved to Quincy, where they underwent additional training. In December 1862, the unit saw its first major action, outside Prairie Grove, Arkansas. Some member battalions of the 10th aided with the taking of Arkansas Post and Little Rock the following summer.

Members of the regiment were required to obtain their own mounts, which were owned by the individual members until 1864, when the government bought them from the men. The personnel of the 10th Regiment were reorganized into nine companies in January 1865, and consolidated with the 15th Regiment Illinois Volunteer Cavalry (which had reorganized into three companies). The 10th Regiment, Illinois Volunteer Cavalry (Consolidated) mustered out on November 22, 1865, with members receiving their final pay and discharge on January 6, 1866, at Camp Butler.

== Post war activities ==
The regiment was ordered into New Orleans in a police action following the assassination of Abraham Lincoln in April 1865. The regiment spent much of the latter part of that year fighting Native Americans outside San Antonio, Texas.

== Strength and casualties ==
The regiment was equipped with six two-pound howitzers upon its arrival in Springfield, Missouri in April 1862, after which the regiment was almost constantly on duty. The 10th Illinois was made part of the Army of the Frontier and was stationed at Wilson Creek, Missouri.

During the war, the regiment lost one officer and 24 enlisted men in combat. Three officers and 262 enlisted men died of disease, for a total of 290 fatalities over the course of the war.

== Commanders ==
- Colonel James A. Barrett – November 25, 1861 - May 15, 1862 (resigned).
- Colonel Dudley Wickersham – May 15, 1862 - May 10, 1864 (resigned).
- Colonel James Stuart – mustered out with regiment, November 22, 1865.

== See also ==
- List of Illinois Civil War Units
- Illinois in the American Civil War
