= Battle of Milliken's Bend =

Battle of the American Civil War

Coordinates: 32.44°N 91.10°W

- Part of the American Civil War
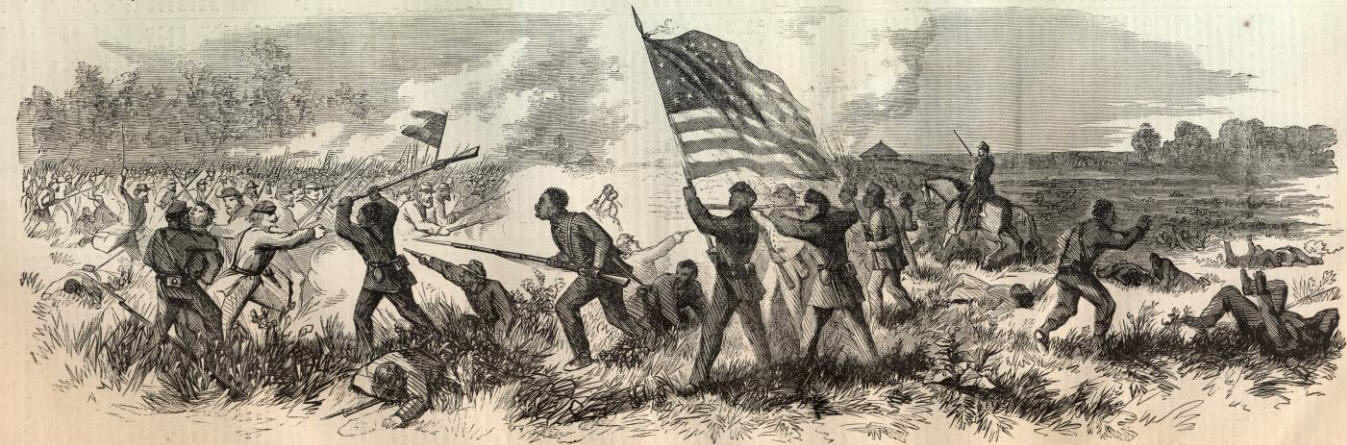
- An illustration of the Milliken's Bend battle from the Harper's Weekly periodical, showing black U.S. soldiers battling Confederates.
Date	June 7, 1863
Location	Madison Parish, Louisiana
Result	Union victory

Belligerents
United States (Union)	Confederate States (Confederacy)

Commanders and leaders
Hermann Lieb	Henry E. McCulloch

Units involved
African Brigade; 23rd Iowa Infantry Regiment; Two gunboats	McCulloch's brigade

Strength
1,100	1,500

Casualties and losses
492	185

The Battle of Milliken's Bend was fought on June 7, 1863, as part of the Vicksburg Campaign during the American Civil War. Major General Ulysses S. Grant of the Union Army placed the strategic Mississippi River city of Vicksburg, Mississippi under siege in mid-1863. Confederate leadership erroneously believed that Grant's supply line still ran through Milliken's Bend, Louisiana, and Major General Richard Taylor was tasked with disrupting it to aid the defense of Vicksburg. Taylor sent Brigadier General Henry E. McCulloch with a brigade of Texans to attack Milliken's Bend, which was held by a brigade of newly-recruited African American soldiers. McCulloch's attack struck early on the morning of June 7, and was initially successful in close-quarters fighting. Fire from the Union gunboat USS Choctaw halted the Confederate attack, and McCulloch later withdrew after the arrival of a second gunboat. The attempt to relieve Vicksburg was unsuccessful. One of the first actions in which African American soldiers fought, Milliken's Bend demonstrated the value of African American soldiers as part of the Union Army.

== Background ==
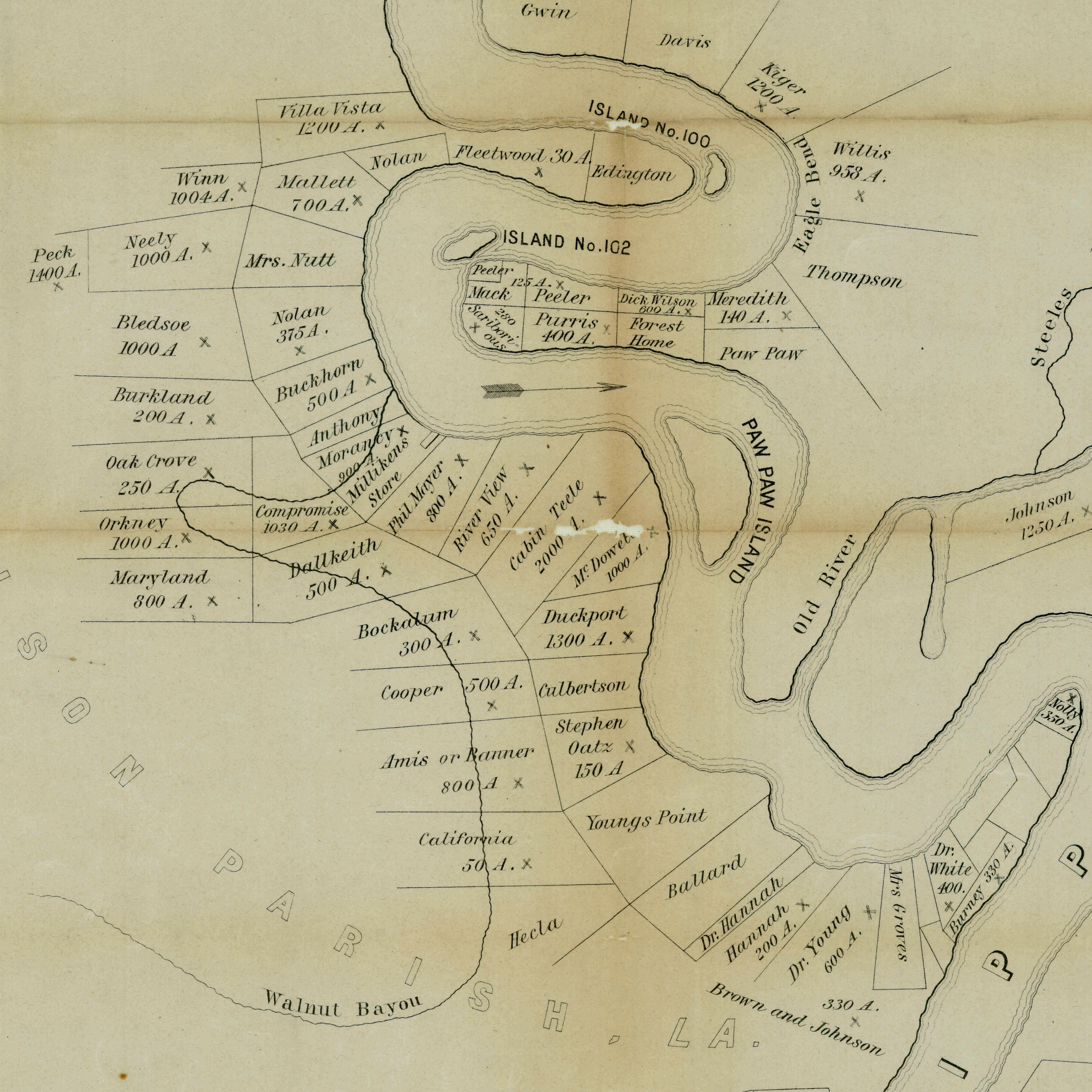
Plantations in the vicinity of Milliken's Bend and location of Milliken's Store, mapped between 1866 and 1874

In the spring of 1863, Major General Ulysses S. Grant of the Union Army began a campaign against the strategic Confederate-held city of Vicksburg, Mississippi. Grant's troops crossed the Mississippi River from the Louisiana side into Mississippi at a point south of Vicksburg in late April. By May 18, the Union army had fought its way to Vicksburg, surrounded it, and initiated the Siege of Vicksburg. During the campaign, Grant had kept a supply base at Milliken's Bend, Louisiana as part of his supply line. Soldiers had been housed at the site before being deployed in the campaign, and a number of hospitals had been established there. During the siege, however, Grant had a different supply line opened: the Union Navy took control of part of the Yazoo River in the Chickasaw Bayou vicinity and established a point from which supplies could be sent overland behind the Union lines. While a position at Milliken's Bend was still held, its importance was greatly reduced, since the Yazoo River position had become Grant's primary supply depot.

Meanwhile, Confederate President Jefferson Davis was pressuring General E. K. Smith, commander of the Trans-Mississippi Department, to attempt to relieve Vicksburg's garrison. Smith was unaware that Grant had moved his supply line to the Yazoo River, and still believed that Milliken's Bend was a primary Union supply depot. Immediate command of the offensive fell to Major General Richard Taylor, who was given a division of Texans known as Walker's Greyhounds. Taylor moved the 5,000-man force to Richmond, Louisiana, but did not believe that the coming expedition had any real chance of disrupting Grant's siege of Vicksburg. On June 5, Taylor learned that Milliken's Bend was no longer a significant supply point, but the planned offensive continued, with hopes of retaking control of the west bank of the Mississippi River and gaining the ability to send food across the river into Vicksburg. At Richmond, on June 6, Taylor detached the 13th Louisiana Cavalry Battalion on a raid against Lake Providence, Louisiana, while Walker's Greyhounds continued to the site of Oak Grove Plantation, where there was a road junction. One Confederate brigade split off to move against a Union position at Young's Point, while Brigadier General Henry E. McCulloch's brigade advanced against Milliken's Bend. A third brigade was held in reserve at Oak Grove.

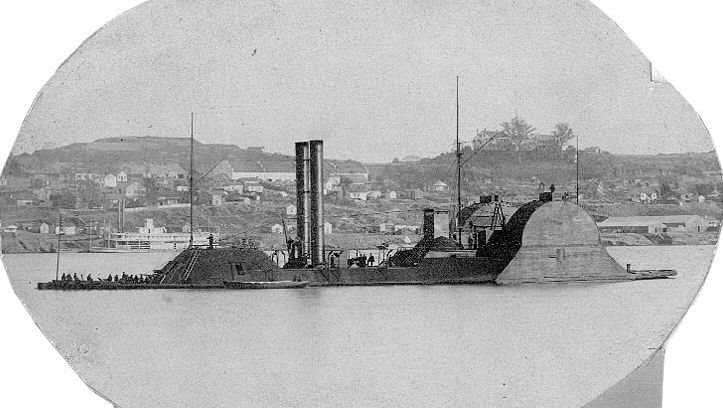
USS Choctaw near Vicksburg

The Union posts at Milliken's Bend, Young's Point, and Lake Providence had become training grounds for African American soldiers. These soldiers were primarily newly-recruited freed slaves. Many of the Black soldiers at Milliken's Bend had been enslaved on nearby cotton plantations. Union leadership's plan had been to use these soldiers as laborers and camp guards rather than front-line soldiers, so they had only received basic military training. At this time, the Colored Troop units were commanded by white officers. Mustering these soldiers into the Union Army faced some opposition, with some believing that they would not fight. The support of several officers, including Major General John A. Logan, however, helped to reduce some of the resistance. The soldiers at Milliken's Bend had no prior experience with firearms before joining the Union Army, and demonstrated very poor marksmanship during training. Colonel Hermann Lieb commanded the camp, which was manned by an infantry brigade of African American soldiers and some cavalry from Illinois.

Both Lieb and Brigadier General Elias Dennis, who commanded the Union troops in the area, suspected that the Confederates were preparing to attack Milliken's Bend. Lieb's 9th Louisiana Infantry Regiment and 10th Illinois Cavalry Regiment had encountered Confederates near Tallulah on June 6 during an expedition towards Richmond. Lieb requested reinforcements, and the 23rd Iowa Infantry Regiment and the ironclad USS Choctaw were sent to Milliken's Bend.

== Battle ==
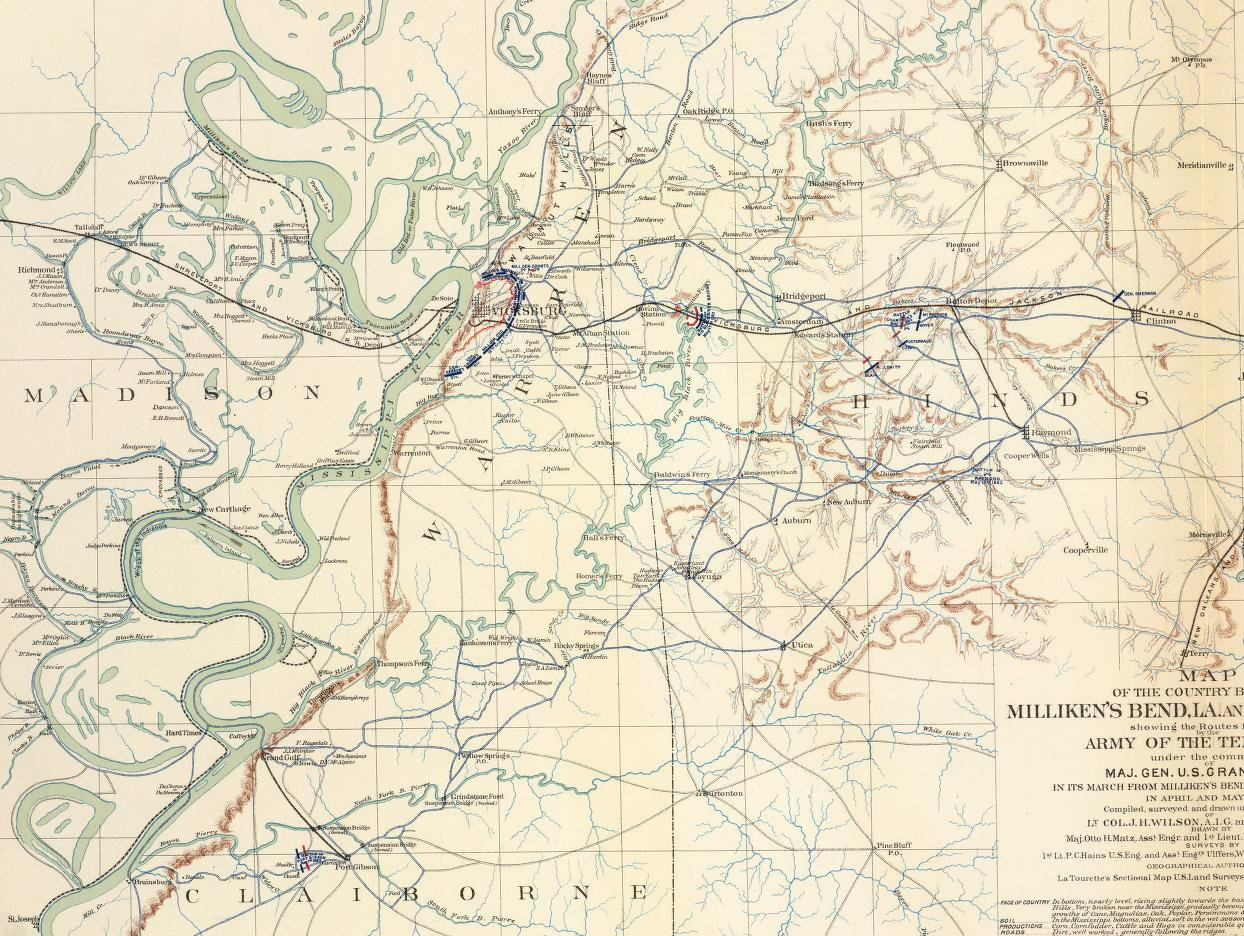
Map of the Vicksburg area from Milliken's Bend to Jackson, Mississippi

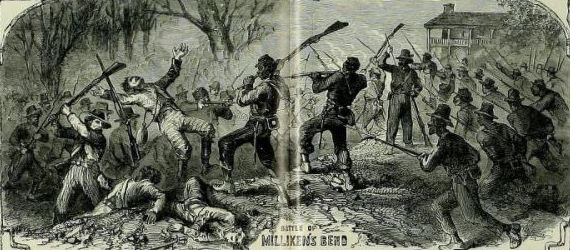
Battle of Milliken's Bend, Frank Leslie's Illustrated Newspaper

On June 7, McCulloch's 1,500 Confederates marched to Milliken's Bend in the cooler nighttime, and by 02:30 arrived within 1.5 miles of Milliken's Bend. By 03:00, they were within 1 mile (1.6 km) of the Union position. Lieb's 1,100 Union soldiers had constructed a defensive position by forming a breastwork out of cotton bales on top of a levee. The Union pickets were quickly driven back by the Confederates. McCulloch aligned his regiments with the 19th Texas Infantry Regiment, 17th Texas Infantry Regiment, and the 16th Texas Cavalry Regiment, from right to left; the 16th Texas Infantry Regiment was held as a reserve. Lieb's defensive line was held by the 23rd Iowa Infantry Regiment and the U.S. Colored Troops of the 8th Louisiana Infantry Regiment, the 9th Louisiana Infantry Regiment, the 10th Louisiana Infantry Regiment, the 11th Louisiana Infantry Regiment, the 13th Louisiana Infantry Regiment, and the 1st Mississippi Infantry Regiment. The main Union line fired a volley that temporarily slowed the Confederate attack, but the poorly trained African American soldiers were largely unable to reload their weapons before the Confederate charge continued and became close-quarters fighting. Bayonets were used in the fighting, and the Union defenders were driven back. Lieb's men fell back to a second levee, and the Confederates charged, yelling that no mercy would be given.

During this stage of the fighting, few shots were fired, as the use of rifles as blunt weapons and bayonets was more common. By 04:00, the Confederates seemed to have victory, but they then made the mistake of exposing themselves on the top of the levee. Heavy fire from the large guns of USS Choctaw drove McCulloch's men back off the levee. Confederate leadership was unable to get the Texans to attack the levee again. McCulloch requested reinforcements to continue the fighting, but another Union vessel, the timberclad USS Lexington, arrived around 09:00. McCulloch withdrew his men off the field back to Oak Grove Plantation in the face of the gunboats.

== Aftermath and preservation ==
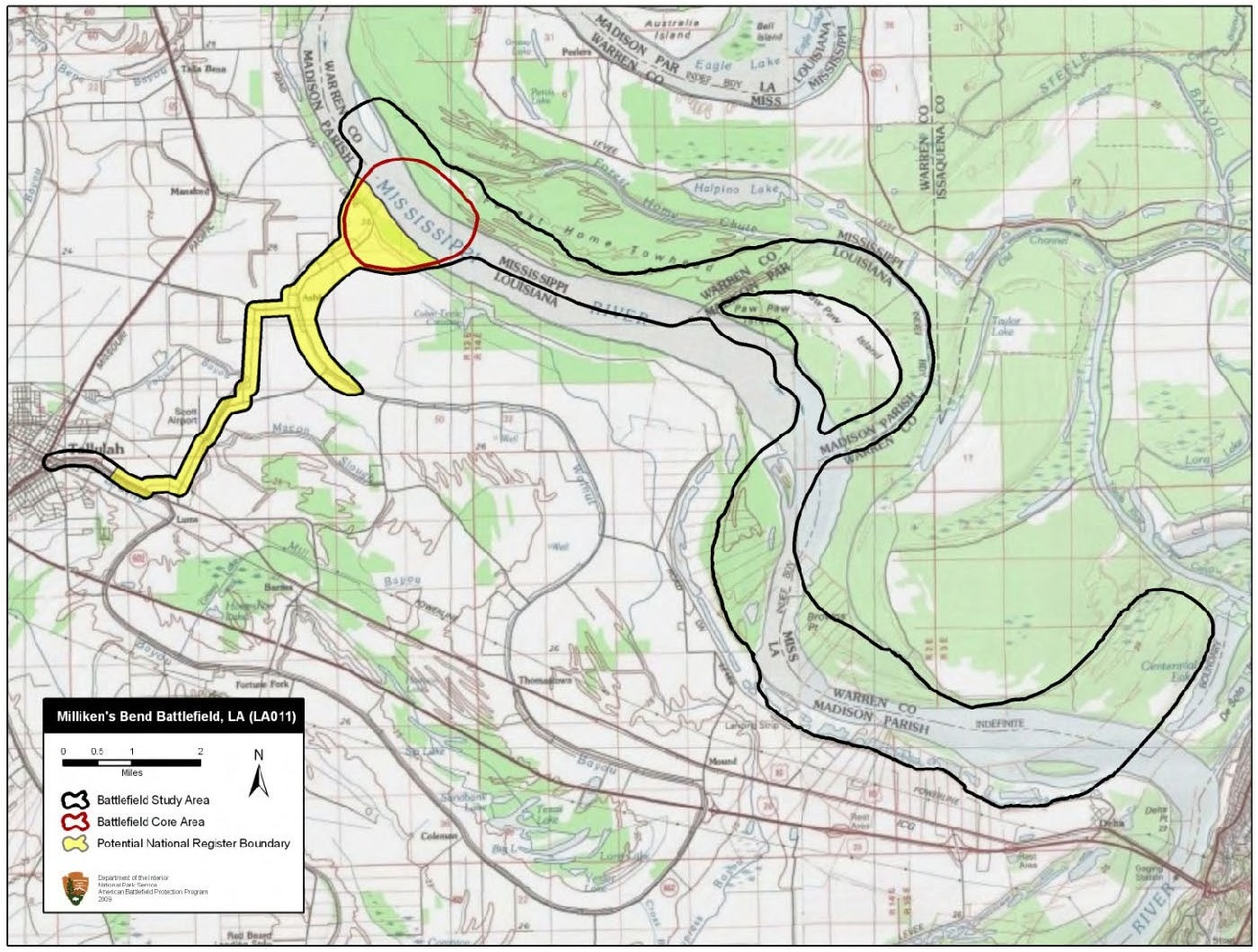
Map of Milliken's Bend Battlefield core and study areas by the American Battlefield Protection Program

The fight at Milliken's Bend cost the Union 492 men: 119 killed, 241 wounded, and 132 missing. Many of the missing men were African American soldiers who had been captured and were returned to slavery. All but 65 of the Union casualties were incurred by the Colored Troops. After the war, Union soldiers originally buried near Milliken's Bend were reinterred at Vicksburg National Cemetery, some in graves marked as unknown. The 9th Louisiana Infantry was particularly hard hit, losing 68 percent of its strength. This was the greatest percentage loss by any African American regiment during the entire war. Their number of dead, at 66, was the highest number of killed in action of any Union regiment (black or white) during a single day in the entire Vicksburg campaign. Furthermore, this figure of killed in action is 23 percent of their starting force - exceeding the 19 percent killed of the famous 1st Minnesota Infantry Regiment at the Battle of Gettysburg. The Confederates lost 185 men.

Rumors of the execution of captured Union soldiers reached Grant, who asked Taylor about the reports. Taylor denied that any executions occurred. (Note: Historian James G. Hollandsworth wrote in 1994 that there was no evidence that Taylor's denial of the executions was a lie, although he does list two white officers captured in the battle in a table of "officers most likely executed after being captured by Confederate forces".) Multiple Union officers later claimed that the Confederates flew black flags at Milliken's Bend to signify a policy of no quarter, and several stated that they had seen the skull and crossbones on these flags. The accuracy of these claims is controversial; historian of the battle of Linda Barnickel believes that this is improbably due to severe shortages of cloth in Walker's division which resulted in many of the Texans wearing improvised clothing. It is possible that the references to the black flag of no quarter originated not with literal flags but were intended to symbolically represent no quarter battle cries made by the Confederate units during the battle.

Confederate losses at Milliken's Bend
Unit	Officers Killed	Men Killed	Officers Wounded	Men Wounded	Officers Missing	Men Missing	Totals
16th Texas Infantry Regiment	0	2	0	5	0	0	7
17th Texas Infantry Regiment	1	20	4	61	0	3	92
19th Texas Infantry Regiment	0	2	0	11	0	6	19
16th Texas Cavalry Regiment	1	8	6	41	1	0	67

The other two prongs of the coordinated Confederate attacks accomplished little at the Battle of Young's Point and the Battle of Lake Providence. The column sent to Young's Point was delayed by bad guides and a washed-out bridge, and did not reach the Union camp until 10:30. After watching additional Union troops arrive at the camp, along with the gunboats, the Confederates withdrew without a fight. After Milliken's Bend, the Confederates fell back to Monroe, Louisiana, and Taylor travelled to Alexandria, Louisiana, where he focused more attention on the Union forces at New Orleans, Louisiana, than Vicksburg. Smith and the Trans-Mississippi Confederates no longer were able to influence the outcome of the Siege of Vicksburg. The city surrendered on July 4. The position at Milliken's Bend had fallen out of relevance not long after the battle when the men and supplies stored there were transferred to Young's Point.

Parts of the site of the battle have been destroyed by changes in the course of the Mississippi River. A 2010 study by the American Battlefield Protection Program found that of the over 17,000 acres (6,900 ha) of the battlefield, about 2,000 acres (810 ha) were potentially eligible to be listed on the National Register of Historic Places. At the time of the study, there was no public interpretation of the battle at the site. A historical marker erected in 1962 on Thomastown Road near Richmond was reported missing in January 2023. The visitor center at Vicksburg National Military Park has interpretive exhibits about the battle. The Mississippi African American Memorial, dedicated at Vicksburg National Military Park in 2004, honors Black Mississippians who took part in the Vicksburg campaign, including soldiers of the 1st Mississippi Infantry (African Descent) who fought at Milliken's Bend. Additionally, an interpretive exhibit exists at Grant's Canal in Louisiana.

== Significance and legacy ==
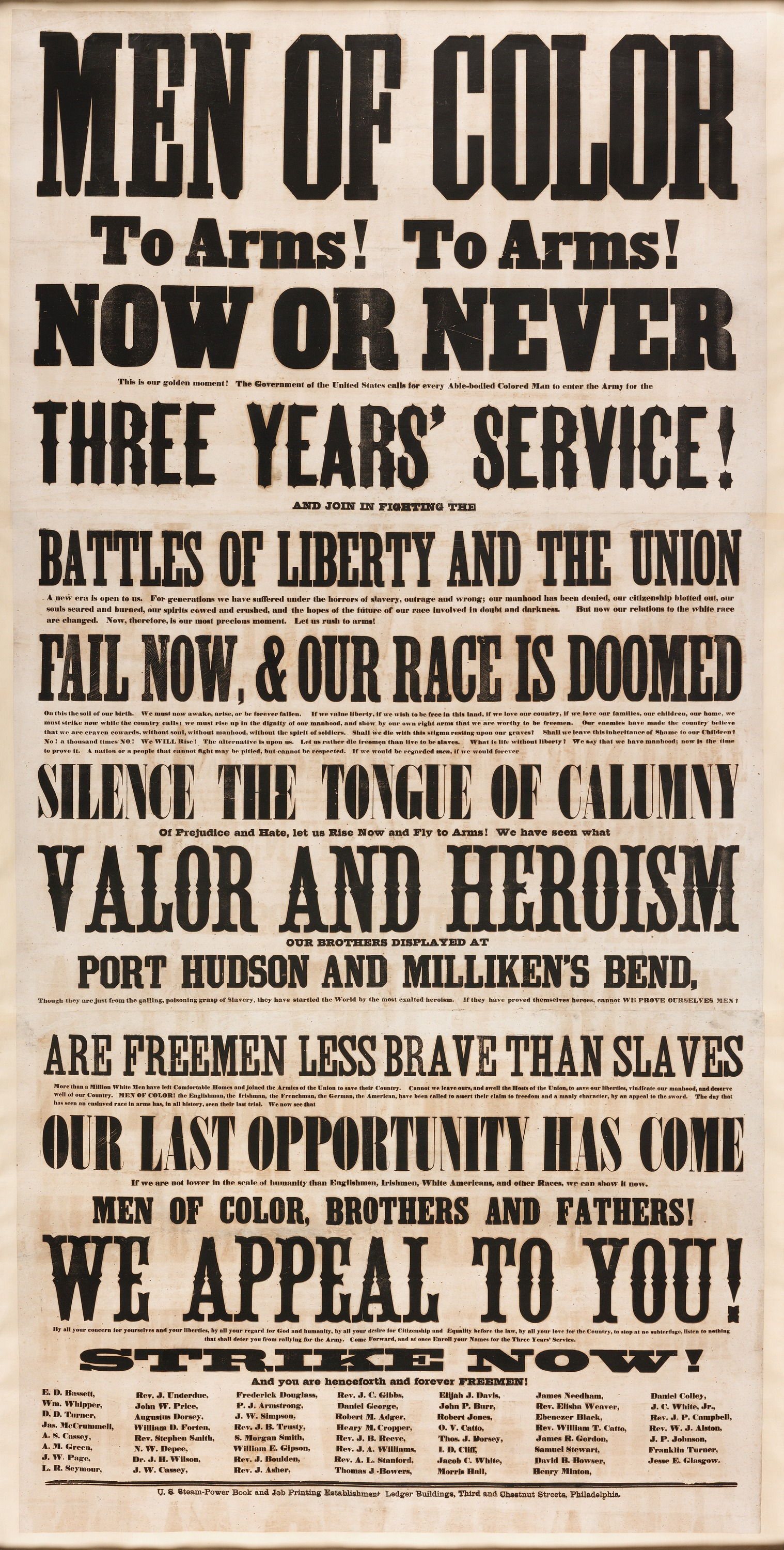
An 1863 recruiting broadside citing the fighting at Milliken's Bend and Port Hudson

Leaders on both sides noted the performance of the African American troops at Milliken's Bend. Unionist Charles Dana reported that the action convinced many in the Union Army to support the enlistment of African American soldiers. A July 1863 Philadelphia recruiting broadside signed by Frederick Douglass and other Black leaders cited the fighting at Milliken's Bend in urging Black men to enlist in the Union Army. Dennis stated "it is impossible for men to show greater gallantry than the Negro troops in this fight." Grant described the battle as the first significant engagement in which the Colored Troops had seen combat, (Note: United States Colored Troops had previously fought in the minor Skirmish at Island Mound in Missouri in late 1862.) described their conduct as "most gallant" and said that "with good officers they will make good troops." He later praised them in his 1885 memoir, stating "These men were very raw, having all been enlisted since the beginning of the siege, but they behaved well." Confederate leader McCulloch later reported that while the white Union troops had been routed, the Colored Troop had fought with "considerable obstinacy." One modern historian wrote in 1960 that the fighting at Milliken's Bend brought "the acceptance of the Negro as a soldier", which was important to "his acceptance as a man."

U.S. Secretary of War Edwin M. Stanton also praised the performance of black U.S. soldiers in the battle. He stated that their competent performance in the battle proved wrong those who had opposed their service:

Many persons believed, or pretended to believe, and confidently asserted, that freed slaves would not make good soldiers; they would lack courage, and could not be subjected to military discipline. Facts have shown how groundless were these apprehensions. The slave has proved his manhood, and his capacity as an infantry soldier, at Milliken's Bend, at the assault upon Port Hudson, and the storming of Fort Wagner.

— Edwin M. Stanton, letter to Abraham Lincoln (December 5, 1863).

== Sources ==
- Barnickel, Linda (2013). Milliken's Bend: A Civil War Battle in History and Memory. Baton Rouge: Louisiana State University Press. ISBN 978-0-8071-4992-8.
- Bearss, Edwin C. (1998). "Battle and Siege of Vicksburg, Mississippi". In Kennedy, Frances H. (ed.). The Civil War Battlefield Guide (2nd ed.). Boston/New York: Houghton Mifflin. pp. 164–167. ISBN 978-0-395-74012-5.
- Bigelow, Martha M. (July 1960). "The Significance of Milliken's Bend in the Civil War". The Journal of Negro History. 45 (3): 156–163. doi:10.2307/2716258. JSTOR 2716258. S2CID 149750795.
- Foote, Shelby (1995) [1963]. The Beleaguered City: The Vicksburg Campaign (Modern Library ed.). New York: The Modern Library. ISBN 0-679-60170-8.
- Hollandsworth, James G. (Autumn 1994). "The Execution of White Officers from Black Units by Confederate Forces during the Civil War". Louisiana History. 35 (4): 475–489. JSTOR 4233150.
- Kennedy, Frances H., ed. (1998). The Civil War Battlefield Guide (2nd ed.). Boston/New York: Houghton Mifflin. ISBN 978-0-395-74012-5.
- Miller, Donald L. (2019). Vicksburg: Grant's Campaign that Broke the Confederacy. New York, New York: Simon and Schuster. ISBN 978-1-4516-4139-4.
- Official Records (1889). "The War of the Rebellion; A Compilation of the Official Records of the Union and Confederate Armies, Volume XXIV, Part II". Washington, D.C.: Government Printing Office.
- Shea, William L.; Winschel, Terrence J. (2003). Vicksburg Is the Key: The Struggle for the Mississippi River. Lincoln, Nebraska: University of Nebraska Press. ISBN 978-0-8032-9344-1.
- Update to the Civil War Sites Advisory Commission Report on the Nation's Civil War Battlefields: State of Louisiana (PDF). Washington, D. C.: National Park Service. October 2010.
- Winschel, Terrence J. (1998). "Chickasaw Bayou, Mississippi". In Kennedy, Frances H. (ed.). The Civil War Battlefield Guide (2nd ed.). Boston/New York: Houghton Mifflin. pp. 154–156. ISBN 978-0-395-74012-5.
