= Corps d'Afrique =

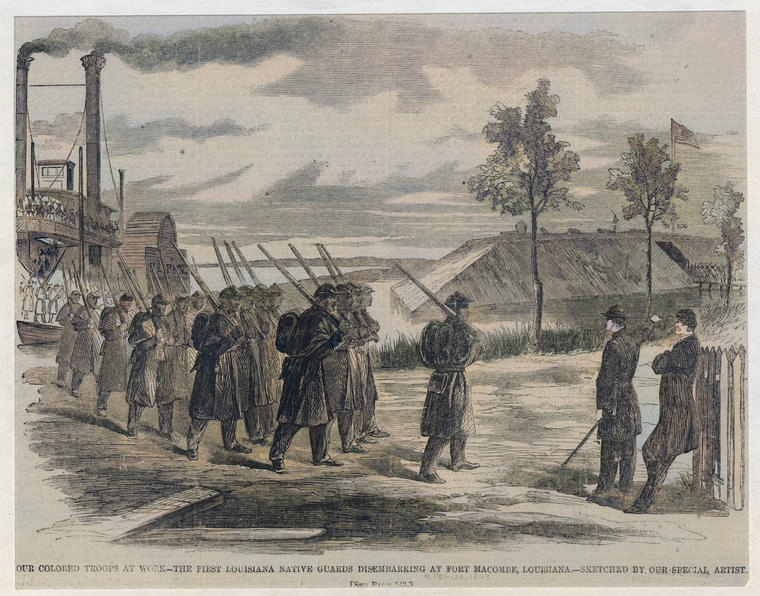
- The 1st Louisiana Native Guard disembarks at Fort Macomb, Louisiana
- Active: May 1, 1863 – April 19, 1864
- Country: United States
- Allegiance: (United States) Union
- Type: Corps
- Engagements: American Civil War; Siege of Port Hudson (1863); Battle of Brownsville (1863); Second Bayou Teche campaign (1863); Red River campaign (1864)

Commanders
- Major General: Nathaniel P. Banks

The Corps d'Afrique was a group of African-American military units recruited from Louisiana that served in the Union Army during the American Civil War. Consisting of several regiments of infantry, artillery, cavalry, and engineers, the Corps d'Afrique regiments were later absorbed into the United States Colored Troops in 1864.

== Background and creation ==
Union naval and land forces captured New Orleans on May 1, 1862, and the city became a focal point for people fleeing from slavery, with 20,000 escaped slaves seeking refuge there within the first six months of Union occupation. Abolitionist-minded Union officers from Northern states were keen to enlist escaped slaves into the army, but the commanding general in New Orleans, Benjamin Butler preferred to use former slaves for manual labor, and was concerned that arming Black soldiers would alienate white plantation owners. Butler did accept the volunteer service of the Native Guard regiments, which were formed by free people of color and Louisiana Creole people, with the 1st Native Guard Regiment mustering into Union service on September 27, 1862.

Butler was replaced as commander in New Orleans by Major General Nathaniel P. Banks in December, 1862. Banks purged the Black officers from the Native Guard regiments, replacing them with white officers from Northern states, and claiming that "the appointment of colored officers is detrimental to the service." When the Lincoln administration changed its policy to allow escaped slaves to enlist in the army, General Daniel Ullmann was sent to New Orleans to recruit 5 new Black infantry regiments.

Banks and Ullmann were both political generals who owed their ranks to connections and influence rather than military skill. Banks was a moderate who expressed racial prejudice and had blocked Black soldiers from serving in the state militia when he was governor of Massachusetts, whereas Ullmann, a Republican supported by many abolitionist Northern politicians, believed that "[Black troops] can be made soldiers of as high an average as any in the world...all that is necessary is to give them a fair chance."

Seeking to not be outdone by his rival Ullman's recruiting drive, on May 1, 1863, Banks issued General Orders No. 40, Department of the Gulf, which stated his intent of forming a corps-sized unit composed of colored soldiers:

The major-general commanding the department proposes the organization of a corps d'armee of colored troops, to be designated as the Corps d'Afrique. It will consist ultimately of eighteen regiments, representing all arms -- infantry, artillery, cavalry -- making three brigades of two regiments each, and three divisions of three brigades each, with appropriate corps of engineers, and flying hospitals for each division, appropriate uniforms, and the graduation of pay to correspond with the value of services, will be hereafter awarded.

== Organization ==
The Corps d'Afrique was formed initially from the four infantry regiments of the Louisiana Native Guard raised by General Butler before Banks replaced him as commander of the Department of the Gulf, and the five colored infantry regiments raised by General Ullman. Most of the remainder of the Corps d'Afrique regiments would be formed at New Orleans. Utilizing both voluntarily enlistment and conscription of freedmen and escaped slaves, the corps eventually grew to over twenty regiments before being absorbed into the Bureau of Colored Troops in April 1864.

Initially assigned to XIX Corps, the Corps d'Afrique units took part in the Siege of Port Hudson, which captured an important Confederate strongpoint along the Mississippi River in July, 1863. Port Hudson then served as the headquarters of the Corps d'Afrique, who were tasked with defending it from Confederate raids.

Though the Native Guard regiments had black officers, including Andre Cailloux and P. B. S. Pinchback, Banks had purged the black officers of the Louisiana Native Guard and replaced them with white soldiers from other units, primarily from the North. Units created subsequent to General Order No. 40 would be initially staffed with white officers. First Lieutenant Charles Sauvinet would be the only black officer from the Louisiana Native Guard to retain his commission until the end of the war.

On April 19, 1864, General Banks issued General Order 51, which redesignated the Corps d'Afrique as United States Colored Troops regiments, and gave them new USCT regimental names and numbers as listed in the table below.

== Units ==
Corps d'Afrique regiments
Infantry
Predecessor unit	Corps d'Afrique unit	U.S. Colored Troops unit
1st Louisiana Native Guard	1st Infantry (Corps d'Afrique)	73rd U.S. Colored Troops
2nd Louisiana Native Guard	2nd Infantry (Corps d'Afrique)	74th U.S. Colored Troops
3rd Louisiana Native Guard	3rd Infantry (Corps d'Afrique)	75th U.S. Colored Troops
4th Louisiana Native Guard	4th Infantry (Corps d'Afrique)	76th U.S. Colored Troops
N/A	6th Louisiana (African Descent)	(inactivated)
N/A	7th Louisiana (African Descent)	64th U.S. Colored Troops
8th Louisiana (African Descent)	(same)	47th U.S. Colored Troops
9th Louisiana (African Descent) (old)	1st Mississippi Heavy Artillery (African Descent)	5th U.S. Colored Heavy Artillery
N/A	9th Louisiana (African Descent) (new)	63rd U.S. Colored Troops
10th Louisiana (African Descent)	(same)	48th U.S. Colored Troops
11th Louisiana (African Descent)	(same)	49th U.S. Colored Troops
12th Louisiana (African Descent)	(same)	50th U.S. Colored Troops
N/A	5th Infantry (Corps d'Afrique)	77th U.S. Colored Troops
N/A	6th Infantry (Corps d'Afrique)	78th U.S. Colored Troops
N/A	7th Infantry (Corps d'Afrique)	79th U.S. Colored Troops (old)
N/A	8th Infantry (Corps d'Afrique)	80th U.S. Colored Troops
N/A	9th Infantry (Corps d'Afrique)	81st U.S. Colored Troops
N/A	10th Infantry (Corps d'Afrique)	82nd U.S. Colored Troops
N/A	11th Infantry (Corps d'Afrique)	83rd U.S. Colored Troops (old)
N/A	12th Infantry (Corps d'Afrique)	84th U.S. Colored Troops
N/A	13th Infantry (Corps d'Afrique)	85th U.S. Colored Troops
N/A	14th Infantry (Corps d'Afrique)	86th U.S. Colored Troops
N/A	15th Infantry (Corps d'Afrique)*	99th U.S. Colored Troops
N/A	16th Infantry (Corps d'Afrique)	87th U.S. Colored Troops
N/A	17th Infantry (Corps d'Afrique)	88th U.S. Colored Troops
N/A	18th Infantry (Corps d'Afrique)	89th U.S. Colored Troops
N/A	19th Infantry (Corps d'Afrique)	90th U.S. Colored Troops
N/A	20th Infantry (Corps d'Afrique)	91st U.S. Colored Troops
N/A	22nd Infantry (Corps d'Afrique)	92nd U.S. Colored Troops
N/A	25th Infantry (Corps d'Afrique)	93rd U.S. Colored Troops
* the 15th Infantry (Corps d'Afrique) became the 5th Engineers (Corps d'Afrique) on February 10, 1864
Cavalry
Predecessor unit	Corps d'Afrique unit	U.S. Colored Troops unit
N/A	1st Cavalry (Corps d'Afrique)	4th U.S. Colored Cavalry
N/A	Mounted Rangers (Corps d'Afrique)**	N/A
** the Mounted Rangers (Corps d'Afrique) became Company F of the 1st Cavalry (Corps d'Afrique) by the end of 1863
Artillery
Predecessor unit	Corps d'Afrique unit	U.S. Colored Troops unit
1st Louisiana Heavy Artillery (African Descent)	1st Heavy Artillery (Corps d'Afrique)	10th U.S. Colored Heavy Artillery***
N/A	1st Battery, Light Artillery (Corps d'Afrique)	Battery C, 2nd U.S. Colored Light Artillery
N/A	2nd Battery, Light Artillery (Corps d'Afrique)	Battery D, 2nd U.S. Colored Light Artillery
N/A	3rd Battery, Light Artillery (Corps d'Afrique)	Battery E, 2nd U.S. Colored Light Artillery
*** the 1st Heavy Artillery (Corps d'Afrique) was originally designated the 7th U.S. Colored Heavy Artillery
Engineers
Predecessor unit	Corps d'Afrique unit	U.S. Colored Troops unit
1st Louisiana Engineers	1st Engineers (Corps d'Afrique)	95th U.S. Colored Troops
N/A	2nd Engineers (Corps d'Afrique)	96th U.S. Colored Troops
N/A	3rd Engineers (Corps d'Afrique)	97th U.S. Colored Troops
N/A	4th Engineers (Corps d'Afrique)	98th U.S. Colored Troops
15th Infantry (Corps d'Afrique)	5th Engineers (Corps d'Afrique)	99th U.S. Colored Troops
Medical
Predecessor unit	Corps d'Afrique unit	U.S. Colored Troops unit
N/A	Corps d'Afrique General Hospital	(same)
Bands
Predecessor unit	Corps d'Afrique unit	U.S. Colored Troops unit
N/A	Brigade Band No. 1 (Corps d'Afrique)	Brigade Band No. 1, U.S. Colored Troops
N/A	Brigade Band No. 2 (Corps d'Afrique)	Brigade Band No. 2, U.S. Colored Troops

== See also ==
- List of United States Colored Troops Civil War units
- United States Colored Troops
