= 4th United States Colored Cavalry Regiment =

4th United States Colored Cavalry 1st Cavalry, Corps d'Afrique
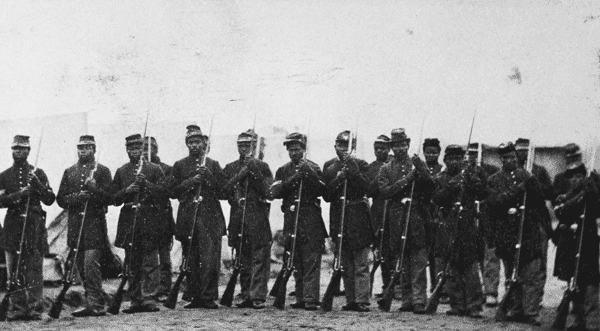
- Colored troops at Port Hudson, Louisiana
- Active: Sep. 12, 1863 – Mar. 20, 1866
- Country: United States
- Allegiance: (United States) Union
- Branch: Cavalry
- Type: Regiment
- Engagements: American Civil War; Action at Olive Branch (1864)

Commanders
- Colonel: James Grant Wilson
- Lieutenant colonel: Julius Alexander; Nathaniel Mitchell

The 4th United States Colored Cavalry Regiment was an African American cavalry regiment that served in the Union Army during the American Civil War. The regiment mustered in as the 1st Cavalry (Corps d'Afrique) at New Orleans on September 12, 1863 and was stationed for the entirety of its existence at various bases throughout Louisiana, mustering out at New Orleans on March 20, 1866.

== 1st Cavalry, Corps d'Afrique ==
=== Organization ===
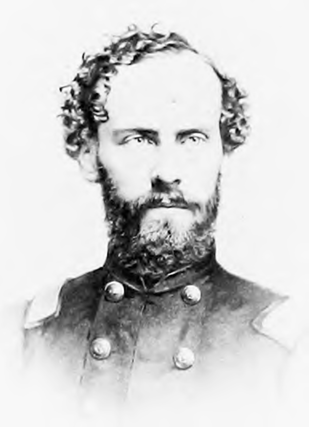
Major Joseph W. Paine, the most prolific recruiter for the 4th Colored Cavalry

The Corps d'Afrique was created on May 1, 1863, by Major General Nathaniel P. Banks, who replaced Major General Benjamin F. Butler as commander of the Department of the Gulf, to organize an army corps of infantry, cavalry and artillery regiments composed entirely of colored troops. All of the officers, however, would be white. As a part of that plan, the 1st Cavalry (Corps d'Afrique) was organized at New Orleans, Louisiana, and mustered in on September 12, 1863, for three years' service. The regiment was composed primarily of freedmen from other states and areas of Louisiana not under Union control and escaped slaves from the New Orleans area (since New Orleans and its surrounding parishes were under Union control, those areas were not subject to the Emancipation Proclamation). The regiment underwent cavalry training at the Cavalry Camp of Instruction at Greenville, Louisiana and was then moved to Camp Parapet, just north of New Orleans.

The first commander assigned to the regiment was Colonel James Grant Wilson, formerly of the 15th Illinois Cavalry, who served simultaneously as the aide-de-camp to Major General Banks and never assumed operational control of the regiment. The first operational commander of the regiment was Lieutenant Colonel Julius H. Alexander, formerly of the 7th Kentucky Cavalry. The company commanders were primarily from other cavalry units in the North, and some had already seen combat action prior to receiving commissions in the 1st. At least two company-grade officers who accepted provisional commissions into the 1st were eventually not mustered into the unit; one of these officers was Captain P. B. S. Pinchback, who previously served in the 1st and 2nd Louisiana Native Guard.

Some of the officers assigned to the 1st would accompany other units and recruit on behalf of the 1st. For example, Company F was composed of freedmen from the New Iberia area during the second Bayou Teche campaign in October 1863 and was originally to be a mounted infantry unit called the Mounted Rangers (Corps d'Afrique). Company H was composed of freedmen recruited by Captain Franz Beuter after the Union occupation of Indianola, Texas in late 1863 and early 1864. Recruiting efforts by Major Joseph W. Paine, formerly of the 13th New York Cavalry, during the Red River campaign in April 1864 resulted in the formation of Company I (mostly freedmen from Grand Ecore, northwest of Natchitoches) and companies K, L, and M (all composed of freedmen mainly from Alexandria).

Unfortunately, the recruiting work could be dangerous. On March 22, 1864, while accompanying a XIX Corps movement to Alexandria during the Red River campaign, Second Lieutenant William Hamblin, formerly of the 3rd Massachusetts Cavalry, was captured by Confederate guerrillas near Washington, Louisiana, north of Opelousas. Listed as a prisoner of war, Hamblin was taken to a Confederate prison camp in Opelousas and was thought to haven been taken from Opelousas to a Confederate prison camp in Tyler, Texas. He never made it to Tyler; Hamblin was executed in Opelousas by a Confederate firing squad. Later that same month, a soldier accompanying Major Paine was wounded in an engagement while on picket duty outside of Alexandria.

First company commanders
Co.	Rank/Name	Previous unit	Join date
A	Capt. Charles Tibbitts	3rd Massachusetts Cavalry	Sep. 15, 1863
B	Capt. Isidore McCormack	N/A; civilian	Oct. 27, 1863
C	Capt. Otto Hefty	N/A; civilian	Nov. 7, 1863
D	Capt. Henry Crickmore	N/A; civilian	Dec. 26, 1863
E	Capt. Edward Bangs	3rd New York Cavalry	Jan. 20, 1864
F	Capt. Samuel White	2nd Illinois Cavalry	Dec. 19, 1863
G	Capt. Joseph Loomis	Co. A (Cavalry), 36th Illinois	Feb. 13, 1864
H	Capt. Franz Beuter	Prussian Army	Apr. 8, 1864
I	Capt. George Seymour	N/A; civilian	Apr. 27, 1864
K	Capt. Watson Goodrich	2nd Illinois Cavalry	May 12, 1864
L	First Lt. Andrew Whittier	3rd Massachusetts Cavalry	Aug. 23, 1864
M	First Lt. Edward Cleveland	1st Texas Cavalry	Aug. 14, 1864

=== Service ===
The regiment was initially assigned to the Defences of New Orleans and stationed at various New Orleans-area bases including Camp Colfax (Carrollton), Camp Parapet (Jefferson), and Fort Butler (Donaldsonville). Their service was primarily menial labor and garrison duty at Camp Parapet. However, in October 1863, a detachment of companies A and C was detailed to Company Canal (near present-day Westwego) to protect the New Orleans & Opelousas Railroad.

On April 4, 1864, the Corps d'Afrique was placed under the United States Colored Troops, and the 1st Cavalry, Corps d'Afrique was redesignated as the 4th United States Colored Cavalry.

== 4th U.S. Colored Cavalry ==
=== 1864 ===
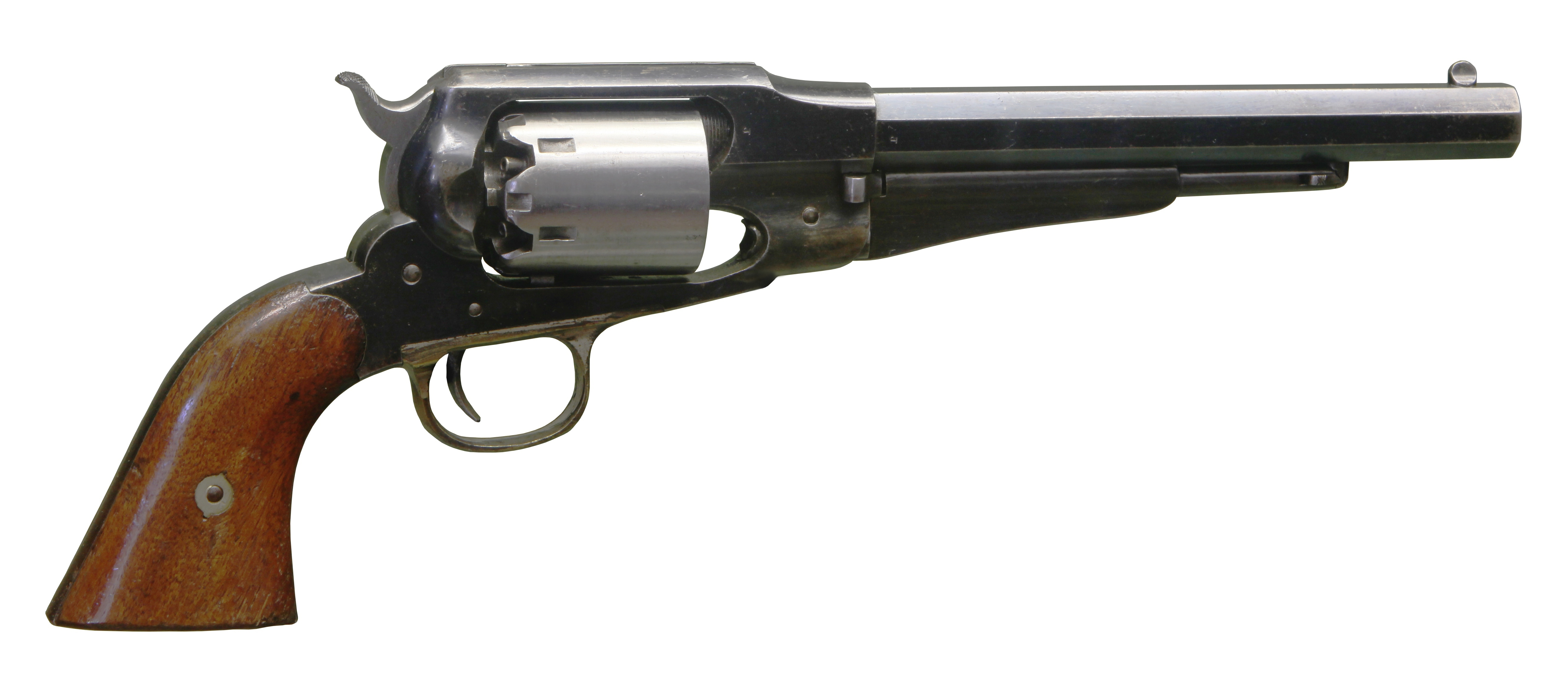
Remington New Model Army revolver that was used by the 4th U.S. Colored Cavalry

On June 11, 1864, a battalion of the 4th was sent to New Orleans to participate in the Emancipation Jubilee, which celebrated the ratification of the State Constitution of 1864 that abolished slavery throughout Louisiana, including in the thirteen parishes exempted in the Emancipation Proclamation. Though unmounted and their weapons unloaded, the 4th led the procession, which included social, civic, religious, abolitionist and benevolent groups. In the procession was the family of Captain Andre Cailloux, the Louisiana Native Guard officer who was killed in the Siege of Port Hudson.

In July 1864, companies A and K were detached to provide pickets for the New Orleans & Jackson Railroad, which ran through Camp Parapet. In addition to guarding against use of the railroad by Confederate forces, the pickets were also protecting the 7th U.S. Colored Heavy Artillery, which were adding heavy cannons at Pass Manchac. The remainder of the regiment underwent training at the Cavalry Camp of Instruction in Greenville. Because the regiment was still unmounted, the training used the infantry training manuals written by Major General Silas Casey.

On August 8, 1864, the 4th was relieved from duty under the Defences of New Orleans and transferred from Camp Parapet to Port Hudson under the U.S. Forces at Port Hudson, relieving the 2nd Louisiana Mounted Infantry and placing a much-requested dedicated cavalry presence at Port Hudson. While at Port Hudson, the regiment began the process of being mounted, with the 4th reported as having 325 horses by August 22, 1864. With the regiment's focus now back to mounted cavalry, such weapons as the Remington Model 1858 revolver and the Burnside carbine was issued to the regiment's soldiers.

As the 4th was still being fully mounted, the regiment participated in an expedition to Clinton, Louisiana from August 23–29, 1864 to flush out Confederate jayhawkers based there. While on that expedition, the regiment saw combat action on August 25 at Olive Branch, on the Comite River about ten miles south of Clinton, resulting in one soldier wounded. Though this is the only recorded official combat engagement involving the 4th, the regiment sporadically engaged small units while on picket duty at various locations. Upon his medical discharge in November 1864 as a result of adverse effects of a gunshot wound, regiment commander Lieutenant Colonel Julius H. Alexander was replaced by Major Nathaniel C. Mitchell, formerly of the 15th Illinois Cavalry.

=== 1865 and 1866 ===
On January 28, 1865, the 4th underwent a reorganization that saw companies I, K, L, and M absorbed into, respectively, companies H, D, B, and E, reducing the number of companies in the regiment from twelve to eight. On March 27, 1865, regiment commander Major Nathaniel Mitchell was promoted to lieutenant colonel; he would continue to command the 4th. The 4th went on an expedition from Port Hudson to Jackson, Louisiana from April 11–13, 1865 to escort an engineering team repairing telegraph lines. Simultaneously, a battalion of the 4th escorted another telegraph repair team from Port Hudson to Osyka, Mississippi. The battalion left Port Hudson on April 12 and arrived at Osyka on April 17. Using the repaired telegraph line, the 4th confirmed to the Confederate forces at Osyka that General Robert E. Lee had already surrendered the Army of Northern Virginia on April 9.

The 4th would remain stationed at Port Hudson until July 1865, when the regiment was placed in field service. Now tasked with providing peacekeeping duties during the Reconstruction era, detachments of the regiment would serve at various points throughout Louisiana, including Baton Rouge (companies C and H), Bayou Sara (companies A and B), Monroe and Vidalia (companies D and E) until December 1865, when the regiment was ordered to Baton Rouge and then to Greenville. The regiment mustered out at Greenville on March 20, 1866.

== Casualties ==
The regiment lost a total of 180 soldiers. 114 soldiers, including one officer, died of disease; the leading cause of death in the regiment was dysentery, which killed 43 soldiers. The death certificates of 35 soldiers either listed their cause of death as unknown or no cause of death was listed. Four soldiers died of gunshot wounds (one shot by a provost guard, one shot by a civilian, possibly a plantation owner, and two accidental shootings), three soldiers drowned in the Mississippi River and one soldier was struck by lightning. Officially, the regiment suffered one combat casualty, which was one private that was wounded at Olive Branch on August 25, 1864.

Union Army: 4th United States Colored Cavalry Regiment Casualties
Action	Officers Killed	Enlisted Killed	Officers Wounded	Enlisted Wounded	Officers Missing	Enlisted Missing
Olive Branch	0	0	0	1	0	0

== See also ==
- List of United States Colored Troops Civil War units
- Louisiana in the American Civil War
- United States Colored Troops
