= 4th Louisiana Native Guard Infantry Regiment =

4th Louisiana Native Guard Infantry
- Active: 1863–1865
- Country: United States of America
- Allegiance: USA
- Branch: Union Army, American Civil War
- Type: Infantry
- Size: Regiment
- Battles: American Civil War: Siege of Port Hudson; Battle of Fort Blakeley

The 4th Louisiana Native Guard Infantry Regiment was an African-American unit of the Union Army during the American Civil War. The 4th Native Guard was later redesignated as the 4th Regiment, Corps d' Afrique, and then finally as the 76th US Colored Infantry Regiment. The Regiment took part in battles at Port Hudson, Louisiana, and Fort Blakely, Alabama before being mustered out of service in December, 1865.

== Formation ==
The regiment was organized on February 10, 1863, at New Orleans as the 4th Regiment Louisiana Native Guard Infantry. The first 3 Native Guard Union regiments of Black troops had been formed in late 1862 after Union forces under General Benjamin F. Butler captured the city. New Orleans had a sizeable population of free people of color, and free Black men had served in the Louisiana militia since the French colonial period. When the Native Guard regiments were first organized, some of the officers were Black men, but General Nathaniel P. Banks, Butler's successor as commander of Union forces in New Orleans, sought to remove them from their positions. He wrote in February as the 4th Regiment was being organized that the 1st, 2nd, and 3rd Native Guard regiments had "negro company officers, whom I am replacing, as vacancies occur, by white ones, being entirely satisfied that the appointment of colored officers is detrimental to the service." and that "The officers of the Fourth Regiment will be white men." Prejudices such as those held by Banks prevented Black soldiers from being commissioned as officers in the US Army until after the Civil War, all of the officers of the 4th Native Guard were white veterans from other Union regiments.

The 4th Native Guard was initially assigned to guard the defenses of New Orleans and Baton Rouge. The Regiment then took part in the siege of Port Hudson beginning in May 1863, as Union forces sought to dislodge the Confederates from their strongpoints along the Mississippi River. The Confederates at Port Hudson surrendered on July 9, this victory along with the capture of Vicksburg, Mississippi a few days earlier, secured control of the entire Mississippi river for the Union.

== Garrison duty ==
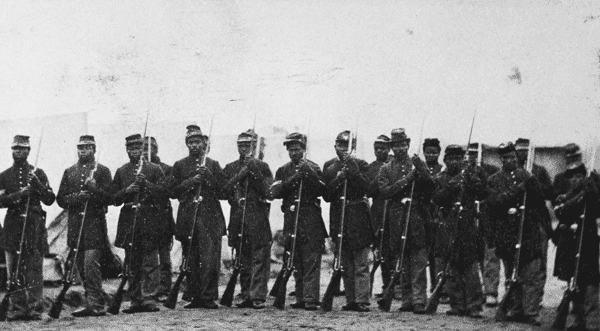
Troops of the Louisiana Native Guard at Port Hudson.

On May 1, 1863, General Banks ordered the creation of the Corps d'Afrique, to be made up of 18 regiments of Black soldiers. The 4th Native Guard was redesignated as the 4th Corps D'Afrique Infantry Regiment on June 6. Banks extended conscription to Black men in Union-held parts of Louisiana to fill the ranks of these regiments. The men in the Corps D'Afrique were recruited (both willingly and through conscription) from New Orleans and local plantations. Many only spoke French and the Army had to appoint instructors to teach the recruits English.

Following the siege of Port Hudson, the 4th Regiment returned to New Orleans for garrison duty at Fort St. Philip and Fort Jackson. Augustus W. Benedict, formerly of the 75th New York, was appointed as the regiment's lieutenant colonel. Benedict gained a reputation for brutally punishing troops in his regiment accused of offenses, and in December 1863 at Fort Jackson a mutiny broke out among the 4th Native Guard after Benedict flogged two men of the regiment with a horsewhip. Flogging had been outlawed as a punishment in the US Army two years earlier, and Black troops in particular resented any type of corporal punishment that reminded them of slavery. The regiment's colonel, Charles W. Drew, managed to calm the troops and assure them that their grievances would be addressed. Benedict was court-martialed and dismissed from the service for "inflicting cruel and unusual punishment, to the prejudice of good order and military discipline." 13 men of the regiment were court-martialed for mutiny, with 9 found guilty. 2 men were sentenced to be executed but their punishments were later commuted to imprisonment.

In February 1864, the 4th Corps D'Afrique regiment was sent to garrison Port Hudson. At this stage of the war, Black units were assigned to garrison duties to hold strategic points along the Mississippi River and free up veteran Union regiments for service elsewhere. General Henry Halleck wrote to Ulysses S. Grant, in July 1863, shortly after the capture of Vicksburg, expressing his opinion that the regiments of freshly-recruited Black troops would be suitable for this assignment: “The Mississippi should be the base of future operations east and west. When Port Hudson falls, the fortifications of that place, as well as of Vicksburg, should be so arranged as to be held by the smallest possible garrisons, thus leaving the mass of troops for operations in the field. I suggest that colored troops be used as far as possible in the garrisons."

== Fort Blakely ==
On April 4, 1864, the 4th Corps D'Afrique was redesignated at the 76th US Colored Infantry Regiment. During the final stages of the war, the 76th was sent to Pensacola, Florida, and then marched towards Mobile, Alabama. Mobile was one of the last large Southern cities still held by Confederate forces in the spring of 1865. Starting on April 2, Union forces laid siege to the Confederate-held Fort Blakely on the north side of Mobile bay. On April 9, Union troops including the 76th Regiment assaulted the fort, leading to a Confederate surrender. Col. Drew of the 76th commanded a brigade that included his regiment, the 48th Colored Infantry, and the 68th Colored Infantry. The 76th took part in the final breakthrough of the fort's defenses on April 9. The capture of Fort Blakely effectively eliminated any remaining Confederate force along the Gulf Coast. Unbeknownst to the men fighting in Alabama, on the same day that they attacked the fort Confederate General Robert E. Lee's troops in Virginia had surrendered a few hours earlier: the fighting at Fort Blakely was the last major battle of the war.

At the end of the war the 76th was assigned to occupation duty at Mobile and Montgomery, Alabama. In June the regiment returned to New Orleans, then travelled to Texas where it was assigned to guard duty along the Rio Grande. The regiment was mustered out of service on December 31, 1865.

Combat casualties of the 4th Louisiana Native Guard/76th US Colored Infantry:
2 officers killed, 3 officers wounded, 11 enlisted men killed, 75 wounded at the Battle of Fort Blakeley.

== Commanders ==
Commanders of the 4th Louisiana Native Guard/76th US Colored Infantry:

- Col. Charles W. Drew
- Lt. Col. Augustus W. Benedict, dismissed from the service, 1863.
- Lt. Col. Ernest W. Holmstedt
- Lt. Col. Alfred C. Hills, resigned 1863.
- Lt. Col. William E. Nye

== See also ==
- List of Louisiana Union Civil War units
- United States Colored Troops
- Military history of African Americans
