= 2nd Louisiana Infantry Regiment =

2nd Louisiana Infantry Regiment may refer to:

- 2nd Louisiana Infantry Regiment (Confederate)
- 2nd Louisiana Infantry Regiment (Union)
- 2nd Louisiana Native Guard Infantry Regiment, a Union regiment
- 2nd New Orleans Infantry Regiment, a Union regiment

== See also ==
- 2nd Louisiana Cavalry Regiment, a Confederate regiment
- 2nd Louisiana Cavalry Regiment (Union)
- 2nd Louisiana Field Battery, a Confederate unit
