= 1st Louisiana Cavalry Regiment =

1st Louisiana Cavalry Regiment may refer to:

- 1st Louisiana Cavalry Regiment (Confederate)
- 1st Louisiana Cavalry Regiment (Union)

== See also ==
- 1st Louisiana Infantry Regiment (disambiguation)
- 1st Louisiana Infantry Battalion, a Confederate unit
- 1st Louisiana Native Guard
- 1st Louisiana Field Battery, a Confederate unit
- 1st Louisiana Regular Battery, a Confederate unit
- 1st Louisiana Colored Light Artillery Battery, a Union unit
