= Louisiana Native Guard =

Louisiana Native Guard may refer to any of several primarily African American regiments in both the Confederate and Union (United States) armies during the American Civil War:

- 1st Louisiana Native Guard (Confederate), Confederate militia unit (1861-1862) disbanded early in the war
- 1st Louisiana Native Guard (Union), infantry unit of the Union Army
- 2nd Louisiana Native Guard Infantry Regiment, infantry unit of the Union Army
- 3rd Louisiana Native Guard Infantry Regiment, infantry unit of the Union Army

== See also ==
- List of Louisiana Union Civil War units
