= Henry Demas =

African-American politician and activist

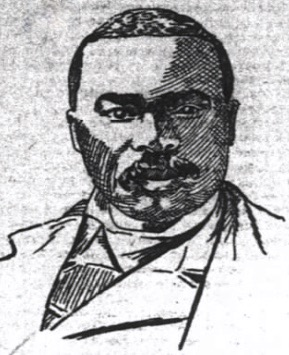
Henry Demas, 19th century Louisiana politician, Civil War soldier, and former slave

Henry Demas (April 16, 1848 – April 19, 1900) was an enslaved African American who became a constable, state legislator, civil rights activist, and organizer of Southern University in Louisiana during the Reconstruction era.

== Early life ==
Demas was born into slavery on April 16, 1848 in St. John the Baptist Parish, Louisiana. Both of his parents were enslaved. His slaveowner was wealthy owner of a plantation and a physician. Demas served in the Union Army during the American Civil War, serving in the Company H of the 80th Regiment from August 1864 to March 1867, during which he attained the rank of Corporal. The 80th Colored Infantry regiment, was attached to the Port Hudson garrison in Louisiana was organized from the 8th Corps d'Afrique Infantry. The regiment operated throughout Louisiana until 1866, when the troops scouted in Texas until the men mustered out in March 1867. Education was offered to the black regimental troops, which Demas availed himself. He was freed after the end of the war.

== Reconstruction era ==
Following his emancipation, Demas was able to attain further education. In 1868, the year after he mustered out of military service, he was elected constable. In 1870, he became an elected politician. He served the House for two terms and then became a senator until 1892. He was among the longest serving African American politicians, serving about two decades as a legislator. His areas of interest included suppression of slavery in Cuba, protection of wildlife, incorporation of a benevolent association, providing police juries the ability to issue bonds, reduction of printing costs, and restriction of monopolies. He was a delegate to national conventions five times.

In 1874, he was a captain in the state militia and made aide-de-camp by Governor William Pitt Kellogg. Demas served as parish treasurer and on the parish school board. He had a sugarcane farm in St. John the Baptist Parish, Louisiana. (Note: In 1880, he had about twelve workers on the farm who were among about a total of 300 area sugarcane workers who went on strike for higher wages, due to increased cost of living expenses. He provided the larger group with advice about how to resolve the dispute. After some of the strikers assaulted freedmen who went to work on the farms, the militia was called in, strike leaders were arrested, and the strike ended. Demas encouraged workers to return to the farms that they had worked on to make the best financial arrangements possible.)

In 1897, Demas was appointed New Orleans Naval Office by Senator Mark Hanna (Ohio) and President William McKinley. The appointment caused a backlash with Democratic newspapers claiming that Demas was one of "Negro politicians who... have enacted the role of masters of the white people" and questioned his character, motives, and honesty.

== Personal life ==
In October 1871, Demas married and the couple had four children. He was living in New Orleans when he died of Bright's disease on April 19, 1900. He was buried at the St John the Baptist Church in Edgard, Louisiana. He was described in an article in the Alexandria Weekly Town Talk newspaper as a "preeminent figure here throughout reconstruction times… and the best known negro politician in Louisiana". He was also described as "the leader of the unscrupulous Republican party during the days of the reconstruction", with a national reputation.
