= Jacques Gla =

American politician

Jacques Gla (1833/4-1894) was an American politician. He was a member of the Louisiana State Senate in 1872 and again from 1874 to 1880. He lived in East Carroll.

Gla was born free in New Orleans in 1833/4 to an old Creole family. In 1862, federal troops seized New Orleans as part of the Anaconda Plan.

Gla subsequently joined the 3rd Louisiana Native Guard as a Captain in Company B. The unit was later renamed the 75th U.S. Colored Infantry. In 1863, under General Nathanial P. Banks, Black officers, including Gla, were purged from service.

After the war, Gla moved to Carroll Parish (later divided in 1877 into East Carroll and West Carroll), where he became a planter. In 1872, he was elected to serve in the Louisiana State Senate from a district encompassing Carroll and Madison Parishes. In this position he served only for a short time. Following a split in the Carroll Republican Party in 1873, Gla became the leader of the conservative Republican faction that opposed carpetbagger George C. Benham. Encouraged by leading Democrats to challenge Benham in the state senate race, Gla put together a ticket of disaffected Republicans.

The 1874 Louisiana elections served as the showdown between these two factions. On the Parish level, the Gla ticket was handily defeated by the Benham ticket, which retained all local offices as well as both state representatives. In the state senate race, Benham won a sizable majority in Carroll Parish, but Gla won the race due to the votes of Madison Parish. Following the election, members of the Gla ticket challenged the election results in court due to several irregularities. In a jury trial, the 13th District Court voided the election and ordered a new one, but this decision was reversed on appeal to the Supreme Court of Louisiana. A Congressional investigation of these irregularities concluded that fraud occurred in favor of Benham but not enough to change the result of the election, as Benham had lost.

In the following year, 1875, the Benham faction, now notably absent of Benham himself, became embroiled in a corruption scandal. An investigation revealed over $50,000 worth of fraudulent claims made since the ascendancy of the Benham faction in 1868. This revelation resulted in the resignation of the entire Police Jury, the indictment of leading members, and the wholesale collapse of the Benham faction. The Governor, William P. Kellogg, appointed several members of the investigatory committee, all Democrats, to fill the vacancies.

Gla was reelected to the state senate in 1876. However, these elections resulted in Democratic control over the state after the Compromise of 1877, and the Redeemer legislature divided Carroll Parish into two shortly after convening for the first time. The Gla faction was able to win control over the newly created East Carroll Parish and took a more conservative approach to governance. Despite the conservative nature of their administration, they were not spared from the violence that erupted in the Louisiana Delta in the counterrevolution of 1878. With many Black leaders being forced to flee or killed and the Southern Republican Party in ruins, in November 1878, Gla joined the Democrats and called for other Blacks to join him. While Gla may have hoped this would mollify Democratic bulldozing, only a few months later in April 1879, all three black members of the East Carroll Police Jury were forced to resign at gunpoint and were replaced by white Democrats.

Gla served in the state senate until 1880. In 1881, he was appointed Surveyor General of Louisiana by President James Garfield. He died in 1894.

== See also ==
- African American officeholders from the end of the Civil War until before 1900
