= 10th United States Colored Heavy Artillery Regiment =

1st Louisiana Regiment Heavy Artillery (African Descent) 1st Corps d'Afrique Heavy Artillery 10th U.S. Colored Heavy Artillery
- Active: 1862–1867
- Country: United States of America
- Branch: Union Army
- Type: Heavy Artillery
- Garrison/HQ: New Orleans, Louisiana
- Engagements: American Civil War

The 10th United States Colored Heavy Artillery Regiment was an artillery regiment in the Union Army during the American Civil War that served in the New Orleans defenses. The unit was organized in New Orleans in November 1862 as the 1st Louisiana Heavy Artillery Regiment (African Descent), and redesignated as the 1st Corps d'Afrique Heavy Artillery Regiment a year later. It briefly became the 7th United States Colored Heavy Artillery Regiment in April 1864, then assumed its final designation in May.

== Corps d'Afrique ==
Union naval and land forces captured New Orleans on May 1, 1862, and the city became a focal point for people fleeing from slavery, with 20,000 escaped slaves seeking refuge there within the first six months of Union occupation. Beginning in September, 1862, the Union army in Louisiana began enlisting free people of color, Louisiana Creole people, and escaped slaves into new army regiments.

The 1st Regiment Louisiana Heavy Artillery, African Descent was organized on November 29, 1862, at New Orleans. In May, 1863, Major General Nathaniel P. Banks reorganized the Black units recruited in Louisiana as the Corps d'Afrique. The regiment was then renamed as the 1st Regiment Heavy Artillery, Corps d'Afrique on November 19, 1863. Most African-American artillery units recruited in the Civil War were assigned to heavy artillery, meaning they manned cannons built within fixed fortifications, rather than mobile field artillery.

== United States Colored Troops ==
The Corps d'Afrique was merged into the United States Colored Troops in April, 1864, and this regiment was redesignated briefly as the 7th Regiment Heavy Artillery, US Colored Troops on April 4, 1864, then finally as the 10th Regiment Heavy Artillery, US Colored Troops on May 21, 1864.

The 10th Heavy Artillery regiment was assigned to guard forts along the Mississippi River and Gulf Coast in Louisiana, such as Fort Jackson, Fort Saint Philip, and Fort Livingston.

The 77th Regiment Infantry U.S. Colored Troops was merged with the 10th Heavy Artillery on October 1, 1865. The regiment was then mustered out of service on February 22, 1867.

== Commanders ==
Commanding officers of the regiment:

- Col. Charles A. Hartwell
- Lt. Col. Samuel Hamblin

== See also ==
- 1st Louisiana Battery Light Artillery (African Descent)
- List of Louisiana Union Civil War units
- List of United States Colored Troops Civil War units
