= List of Union units from Louisiana in the American Civil War =

This is a list of regiments from the U.S. state of Louisiana that fought in the Union Army during the American Civil War (1861–1865). The list of Louisiana Confederate Civil War units is shown separately.

== Artillery ==
- 1st Louisiana Regiment Heavy Artillery (African Descent)
- 1st Louisiana Battery Light Artillery (African Descent)
- 2nd Louisiana Battery Light Artillery (African Descent)
- 3rd Louisiana Battery Light Artillery (African Descent)

== Cavalry ==
- 1st Louisiana Cavalry Regiment
- 2nd Louisiana Cavalry Regiment

== Infantry ==
- 1st Louisiana Infantry Regiment
- 1st Louisiana Regiment New Orleans Infantry
- 2nd Louisiana Infantry Regiment
- 2nd Louisiana Regiment New Orleans Infantry
- 1st Louisiana Regiment Native Guard Infantry
- 2nd Louisiana Regiment Native Guard Infantry
- 3rd Louisiana Regiment Native Guard Infantry
- 4th Louisiana Regiment Native Guard Infantry
- 5th Louisiana Regiment Infantry (African Descent)
- 6th Louisiana Regiment Infantry (African Descent)
- 7th Louisiana Regiment Infantry (African Descent)
- 8th Louisiana Regiment Infantry (African Descent)
- 9th Louisiana Regiment Infantry (African Descent)
- 10th Louisiana Regiment Infantry (African Descent)
- 11th Louisiana Regiment Infantry (African Descent)
- 12th Louisiana Regiment Infantry (African Descent)

== Unit redesignation ==
Regiment	Corps d'Afrique Regiment	U.S. Colored Troops Regiment	Notes
1st Louisiana Regiment Heavy Artillery (African Descent)	1st Corps d'Afrique Regiment Heavy Artillery	7th United States Colored Regiment Heavy Artillery; 10th United States Colored Regiment Heavy Artillery	
1st Louisiana Battery Light Artillery (African Descent)		2nd United States Colored Regiment Light Artillery (Battery C)	
2nd Louisiana Battery Light Artillery (African Descent)		2nd United States Colored Regiment Light Artillery (Battery D)	
3rd Louisiana Battery Light Artillery (African Descent)		2nd United States Colored Regiment Light Artillery (Battery E)	
1st Louisiana Cavalry Regiment			
2nd Louisiana Cavalry Regiment			Consolidated with 1st Louisiana Cavalry September 1864
	1st Corps d'Afrique Regiment Cavalry	4th United States Colored Cavalry Regiment	
1st Louisiana Regiment New Orleans Infantry			
2nd Louisiana Regiment New Orleans Infantry			
1st Louisiana Regiment Infantry			
2nd Louisiana Regiment Infantry			
1st Louisiana Regiment Native Guard Infantry	1st Corps d'Afrique Regiment Infantry	73rd United States Colored Infantry Regiment	
2nd Louisiana Regiment Native Guard Infantry	2nd Corps d'Afrique Regiment Infantry	74th United States Colored Infantry Regiment	
3rd Louisiana Regiment Native Guard Infantry	3rd Corps d'Afrique Regiment Infantry	75th United States Colored Infantry Regiment	
4th Louisiana Regiment Native Guard Infantry	4th Corps d'Afrique Regiment Infantry	76th United States Colored Infantry Regiment	
5th Louisiana Regiment Infantry (African Descent)			Failed to complete organization
6th Louisiana Regiment Infantry (African Descent)			Mustered out after 60 days
7th Louisiana Regiment Infantry (African Descent)		64th United States Colored Infantry Regiment	
8th Louisiana Regiment Infantry (African Descent)		47th United States Colored Infantry Regiment	
9th Louisiana Regiment Infantry (African Descent)		5th United States Colored Heavy Artillery Regiment; 63rd United States Colored Infantry Regiment	
10th Louisiana Regiment Infantry (African Descent)		48th United States Colored Infantry Regiment	
11th Louisiana Regiment Infantry (African Descent)		49th United States Colored Infantry Regiment	
12th Louisiana Regiment Infantry (African Descent)		50th United States Colored Infantry Regiment	
	1st Corps d'Afrique Regiment Engineers	95th United States Colored Infantry Regiment	
	2nd Corps d'Afrique Regiment Engineers	96th United States Colored Infantry Regiment	
	3rd Corps d'Afrique Regiment Engineers	97th United States Colored Infantry Regiment	
	4th Corps d'Afrique Regiment Engineers	98th United States Colored Infantry Regiment	
	5th Corps d'Afrique Regiment Infantry	77th United States Colored Infantry Regiment	
	6th Corps d'Afrique Regiment Infantry	78th United States Colored Infantry Regiment	
	7th Corps d'Afrique Regiment Infantry	79th United States Colored Infantry Regiment (old), disbanded July 28, 1864	
	8th Corps d'Afrique Regiment Infantry	80th United States Colored Infantry Regiment	
	9th Corps d'Afrique Regiment Infantry	81st United States Colored Infantry Regiment	
	10th Corps d'Afrique Regiment Infantry	82nd United States Colored Infantry Regiment	
	11th Corps d'Afrique Regiment Infantry	83rd United States Colored Infantry Regiment (old), disbanded July 28, 1864	
	12th Corps d'Afrique Regiment Infantry	84th United States Colored Infantry Regiment	
	13th Corps d'Afrique Regiment Infantry	85th United States Colored Infantry Regiment - failed to complete organization.	
	14th Corps d'Afrique Regiment Infantry	86th United States Colored Infantry Regiment	
	15th Corps d'Afrique Regiment Infantry; 5th Corps d'Afrique Engineers	99th United States Colored Infantry Regiment	
	16th Corps d'Afrique Regiment Infantry	87th United States Colored Infantry Regiment	
	17th Corps d'Afrique Regiment Infantry	88th United States Colored Infantry Regiment - disbanded July 28, 1864	
	18th Corps d'Afrique Regiment Infantry	89th United States Colored Infantry Regiment - disbanded July 28, 1864	
	19th Corps d'Afrique Regiment Infantry	90th United States Colored Infantry Regiment - disbanded July 28, 1864	
	20th Corps d'Afrique Regiment Infantry	91st United States Colored Infantry Regiment	
	22nd Corps d'Afrique Regiment Infantry	92nd United States Colored Infantry Regiment	
	25th Corps d'Afrique Regiment Infantry	93rd United States Colored Infantry Regiment - disbanded July 23, 1865	

== See also ==
- Lists of American Civil War Regiments by State
- Southern Unionists
- United States Colored Troops
