= 1st New Orleans Infantry Regiment =

1st Louisiana Regiment New Orleans Infantry
- Active: 1864–1866
- Country: United States of America
- Allegiance: USA
- Branch: Union Army
- Type: Infantry
- Engagements: American Civil War

The 1st Louisiana Regiment New Orleans Infantry was a regiment in the Union Army during the American Civil War.

The Regiment was organized in New Orleans, Louisiana, on March 6, 1864, and was on garrison and guard duty in the New Orleans defenses. The 2nd New Orleans Infantry Regiment, which failed to complete organization, was merged into the 1st New Orleans in August, 1864. The unit mustered out in May 1866.

1,377 men total enlisted into the 1st New Orleans Regiment. In additional to local Louisianans, 206 of the enlistees were from Southern Mississippi, many of which were Unionists or deserters from Confederate service.

== See also ==
- List of Louisiana Union Civil War units
