= 77th United States Colored Infantry Regiment =

77th United States Colored Infantry Regiment 5th Corps d'Afrique Infantry Regiment
- Active: 1863–1865
- Country: United States
- Allegiance: United States Union
- Branch: Infantry; United States Colored Troops
- Size: Regiment
- Engagements: American Civil War

The 77th United States Colored Infantry Regiment, originally known as the 5th Corps d'Afrique Infantry was a regiment composed of African-American troops recruited from Louisiana that served in the Union Army during the American Civil War. The 77th Regiment was posted on garrison duty in the vicinity of New Orleans before being merged into an artillery unit in October 1865.

== History ==
Originally formed as the 5th Corps d'Afrique Infantry on December 3, 1863, at Fort Saint Phillip, Louisiana, the regiment was renamed the 77th US Colored Infantry Regiment in April, 1864. The Corps d'Afrique units were organized by Major General Nathaniel P. Banks in the spring of 1863 to create new army regiments from escaped or freed slaves in Louisiana. Officers were white soldiers from Northern states, and Corps d'Afrique recruits in many cases only spoke French. In 1864 all the Louisiana Corps d'Afrique were reorganized as part of the US Colored Troops and given new regimental numbers.

The 77th regiment spent the war on garrison duty, guarding the defenses of New Orleans at Fort Saint Philip and Lake Ponchartrain. In March 1865, a Confederate gunboat captured one officer and nine men from the 77th regiment at the mouth of the Amite River, one soldier was also wounded in this engagement. In May of 1865, the regiment was dispatched to Sabine Pass, Texas for occupation duty.

The 85th US Colored Troops infantry, a regiment that failed to complete organization, was merged into the 77th Regiment in May, 1864. On October 1, 1865, the 77th was consolidated into the 10th United States Colored Heavy Artillery Regiment, at which point the 77th ceased to operate as an independent organization.

== Commanders ==
Commanding officers of the 77th US Colored Troops infantry:

- Colonel Charles A. Hartwell
- Lieutenant Colonel Henry Street

== See also ==
- List of United States Colored Troops Civil War Units
- United States Colored Troops
- List of Louisiana Union Civil War units
