= 82nd United States Colored Infantry Regiment =

82nd United States Colored Infantry Regiment 10th Corps d'Afrique Infantry Regiment
- Active: 1863–1865
- Country: United States
- Allegiance: United States Union
- Branch: Infantry; United States Colored Troops
- Size: Regiment
- Engagements: American Civil War: Skirmish at Gonzalez, FL, July 1864; Battle of Marianna; Battle at Milton, FL, October 1864; Expedition to Pollard, AL, December 1864; Battle of Fort Blakeley

The 82nd United States Colored Infantry Regiment, originally known as the 10th Corps d'Afrique Infantry was a regiment composed of African-American troops recruited from Louisiana that served in the Union Army during the American Civil War. The regiment took part in several battles in Florida and Alabama during the last two years of the war, including the Battle of Fort Blakeley which ended Confederate resistance along the Gulf coast.

== Origins ==
The regiment was first organized as the 10th Corps d'Afrique Infantry on September 1, 1863, at Port Hudson, Louisiana. The Corps d'Afrique units were organized by Major General Nathaniel P. Banks in the spring of 1863 to create new army regiments from escaped or freed slaves in Louisiana. The officers were white soldiers from Northern states, and Corps d'Afrique recruits in many cases only spoke French. The 10th Corps d'Afrique served as a garrison force at Port Hudson, and in 1864 all the Louisiana Corps d'Afrique units were reorganized as part of the US Colored Troops and given new regimental numbers. The 10th Corps d'Afrique was renamed the 82nd US Colored Infantry Regiment on April 4, 1864.

The colonel of the regiment was Ladislas Zulavsky, a nephew of the Hungarian revolutionary Lajos Kossuth and a veteran of Giuseppe Garibaldi's army during the Italian unification wars. Two of Colonel Zulavsky's brothers served as officers in the regiment, one of whom died of disease in 1863.

== Florida and Alabama actions ==
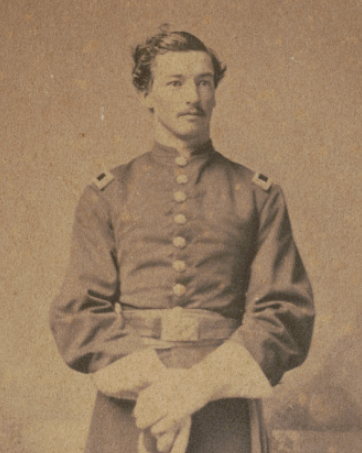
Lieutenant Leroy D. Ball of the 82nd US Colored Infantry.

In April 1864 the regiment was sent to Pensacola, Florida and stationed at Fort Barrancas. The Confederacy had laid siege to the federal forts at Pensacola at the outbreak of the Civil War, but abandoned them to Union forces in May, 1862. Pensacola then became an important base for the Union along the Gulf coast, and several other Colored Infantry regiments were based there. Union forces mounted numerous expeditions from their bases in Pensacola to obtain supplies, draw Confederates into battle, and free enslaved people. In the final two years of the war the bulk of the fighting in Florida was done by Colored Troops regiments rather than white regiments from Northern states.

In July the regiment took part in an expedition from Fort Barrancas towards Pollard, Alabama alongside the 7th Vermont, 86th Colored Infantry, 1st Florida Cavalry, 14th New York Cavalry, and 1st Florida Battery. On July 22, near Gonzalez, Florida, this expeditionary force fought against the Confederate 7th Alabama Cavalry and forced them to retreat.

The regiment fought at the Battle of Marianna in September, 1864, helping to achieve a Union victory. After commanding General Alexander Asboth was seriously wounded in this battle, Colonel Zulavsky of the 82nd was placed in charge of supervising the Union withdrawal back to Fort Barrancas. The victory at Marianna freed 600 enslaved people who were brought back to Pensacola, which became a haven for escaped Florida and Alabama slaves, with approximately 15,000 people seeking shelter there.

In October 1864, the regiment took part in another expedition with the 2nd Maine Cavalry, 1st Florida Cavalry, 19th Iowa Infantry, along with the 25th and 86th Colored Infantry from Fort Barrancas to Milton, Florida. On October 25th, the regiment routed a Confederate force consisting of the 8th Mississippi Cavalry Regiment and local Florida militia forces based near Milton. In December another expedition of Colored troops was mounted towards Pollard, with heavy fighting on the return journey at Pine Barren Creek. In the spring of 1865 the regiment was engaged in building fortifications near Fort Barrancas.

In April, the 82nd regiment along with several other Colored Troops units marched overland towards Mobile, Alabama, one of the last large cities still in Confederate hands. The 82nd then took part in the Battle of Fort Blakeley, an operation aimed at seizing a Confederate-held fort in Mobile Bay. The Union troops laid siege to the fort and assaulted the fortifications on April 9, successfully capturing Fort Blakeley on the same day that General Robert E. Lee's Confederate forces in Virginia surrendered.

After the end of hostilities, the 82nd Regiment returned to Pensacola and was then sent to Apalachicola, Florida to establish a new military post there. Later on the 82nd was stationed at Fort Jefferson near Key West (now part of Dry Tortugas National Park). The regiment remained on occupation duty in Florida until it was mustered out of service on September 10, 1866.

Combat losses of the 82nd include 4 killed and 3 wounded at Port Hudson, 1 wounded at Barrancas, 1 killed and 4 wounded at Mariana, 2 killed and 21 wounded at Mitchell's Creek, 6 wounded at Pine Barren Ford, and 3 killed and 20 wounded at Fort Blakely.

== Commanders ==
Commanding officers of the 82nd US Colored Troops infantry:

- Col. Ladislas L. Zulavsky
- Lt. Col. George E. Wentworth
- Lt. Col. George Tucker, died of disease, 1865.

== See also ==
- List of United States Colored Troops Civil War Units
- United States Colored Troops
- List of Louisiana Union Civil War units
