= James Grant Wilson =

American novelist

James Wilson
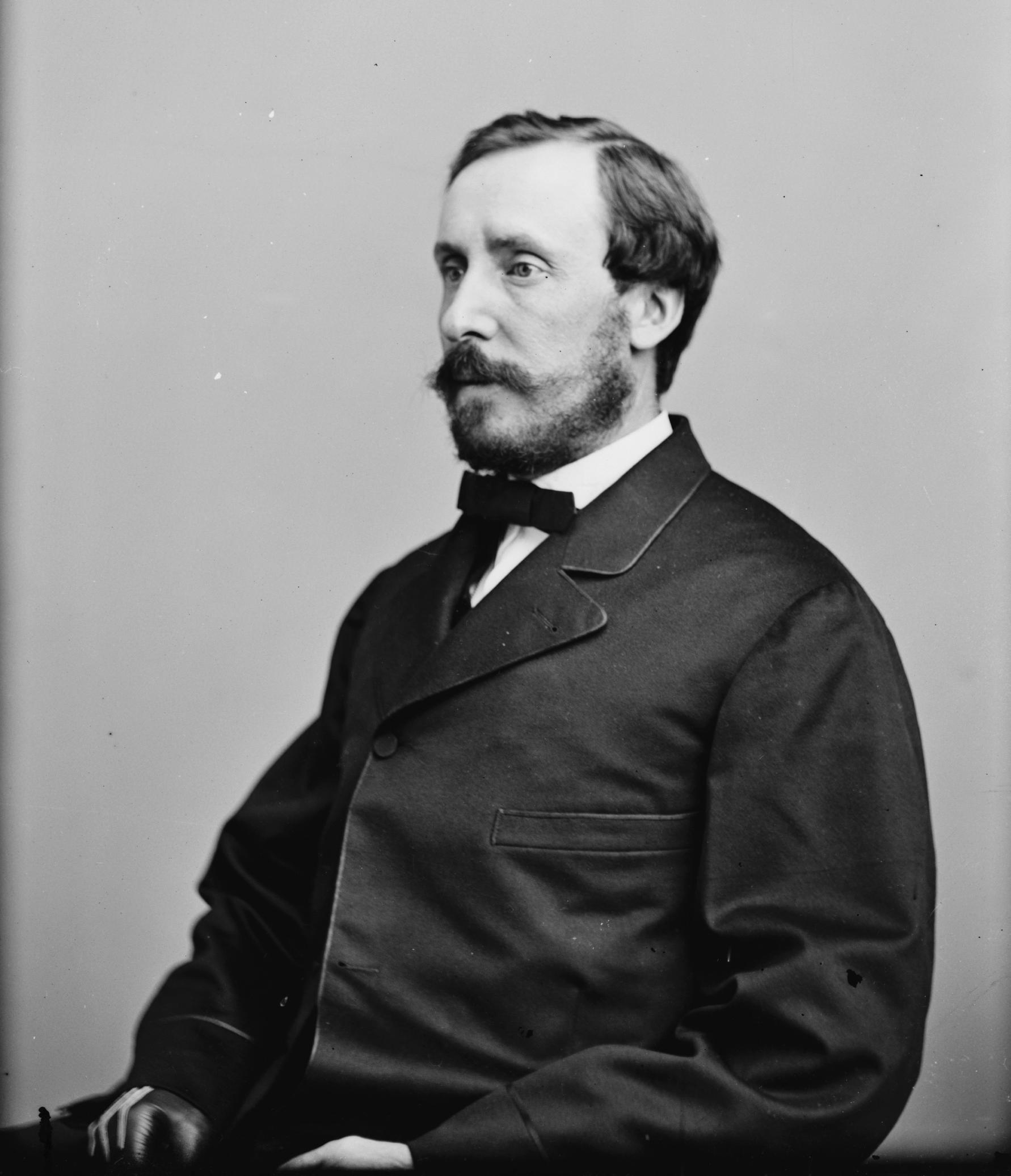
- Wilson c. 1863

Personal details
- Born: April 28, 1832 Edinburgh, Scotland, British Empire
- Died: February 1, 1914 (aged 81) New York City, New York, United States
- Resting place: Woodlawn Cemetery, New York
- Spouses: Jane Emily Searle Cogswell (m. 1869; died 1904) Mary H. Nicholson (m. 1907)
- Children: 1 daughter
- Parent(s): William Wilson; Jane Sibbald
- Education: Bartlett's College Hill School

Military service
- Allegiance: United States
- Branch/service: United States Army
- Years of service: 1862-1865
- Rank: Colonel; Bvt. Brigadier General
- Unit: 15th Illinois Cavalry Regiment
- Commands: 4th U.S. Colored Cavalry Regiment
- Battles/wars: American Civil War

James Grant Wilson (April 28, 1832 – February 1, 1914) was an American editor, author, bookseller and publisher, who founded the Chicago Record in 1857, the first literary paper in that region. During the American Civil War, he served as a colonel in the Union Army. In recognition of his service, in 1867, he was named brevet brigadier general of volunteers to rank from March 13, 1865. He settled in New York, where he edited biographies and histories, was a public speaker, and served as president of the Society of American Authors and the New York Genealogical and Biographical Society.

== Early life ==
James Grant Wilson was born on April 28, 1832, in Edinburgh, Scotland, the son of the poet William Wilson and his second wife, Miss Jane Sibbald of Hawick. In infancy, he moved with his family to the United States, where they settled in Poughkeepsie, New York. He had two younger brothers. Wilson was educated in Poughkeepsie at College Hill and continued his studies in languages, music, and drawing under private teachers.

== Career ==
Eventually, he joined his father in business as a bookseller/publisher, later becoming his partner. In 1855, Wilson embarked on an extended journey, touring Europe and its capitals. Upon his return in 1857, he settled in the growing city of Chicago, Illinois, where he founded the Chicago Record, a journal of art and literature. It was the first literary paper published in that region. He also became known as a speaker.

=== American Civil War ===
During the American Civil War, Wilson sold his journal and entered the Union Army in late 1862. He was commissioned as a major of the 15th Illinois Cavalry Regiment, and eventually commanded the 4th U.S. Colored Cavalry Regiment as colonel. He resigned from the Army on June 16, 1865. On February 27, 1867, President Andrew Johnson nominated Wilson for appointment to the grade of brevet brigadier general of volunteers to rank from March 13, 1865, and the United States Senate confirmed the appointment on March 2, 1867. His middle brother was killed at Fredericksburg, Virginia, and his youngest brother also served.

=== Later career ===
After the war, Wilson settled in New York City. He became known as a speaker, a frequent contributor to periodicals, president of the Society of American Authors, and, after 1885, of the New York Genealogical and Biographical Society. He edited Fitz-Greene Halleck's Poems (1868) and wrote his biography, published in 1869; and in 1876, his anthology Poets & Poetry of Scotland in four volumes. He edited A Memorial History of the City of New York (four volumes, 1892–93); Appletons' Cyclopædia of American Biography (six volumes, 1887–89, with John Fiske; volume vii, 1900); The Great Commanders Series (eighteen volumes, completed 1913); and The Presidents of the United States, 1789-1914 (four volumes, 1914), the work of many distinguished writers..

== Personal life ==
On November 3, 1869, he married Jane Emily Searle Cogswell (d. 1904), the sister of Andrew Kirkpatrick Cogswell (1839–1900) and the daughter of Rev. Jonathan Cogswell (1781–1864) and Jane Eudora Kirkpatrick (1799–1864). Jane's grandfather was Andrew Kirkpatrick (1756–1831) and her great-grandfather was John Bayard. Before her death in 1904, they had one daughter together:

- Jane Wilson, who married Frank Sylvester Henry (who died before 1914)

After his first wife's death in 1904, he married Mary H. Nicholson, the widow of his friend Admiral James William Augustus Nicholson, in 1907. He resided at 143 West 79th Street in New York City.

Wilson died in New York City and is buried in Woodlawn Cemetery, Bronx, New York.

== Selected works ==
- Biographical Sketches of Illinois Officers (1862–63)
- Life of Fitz-Greene Halleck (1869)
- Sketches of Illustrious Soldiers (1874)
- Poets and Poetry of Scotland (1876) (in four volumes) Blackie & Son, Edinburgh 1876
- Centennial History of the Diocese of New York, 1775-1885 (1886)
- Bryant and his Friends (1886)
- Commodore Isaac Hull and the Frigate Constitution (1889)
- Wilson, James Grant (1893). The Memorial History of the City of New York: From Its First Settlement to the Year 1892. New York History Co.
- Love in Letters (1896)
- Life of General Grant (1897)
- Thackeray in the United States (two volumes, 1904)

== See also ==
- List of American Civil War brevet generals (Union)
