= André Cailloux =

American soldier (1825–1863)

- Born: August 25, 1825; Plaquemines Parish, Louisiana, US
- Died: May 27, 1863 (aged 37); Port Hudson, Louisiana, US
- Burial place: Saint Louis Cemetery No. 2 New Orleans, Louisiana, U.S.
- Spouse: Félicie Coulon
- Children: 3
- Military career
- Allegiance: United States
- Branch: Union Army
- Service years: 1862–1863
- Rank: Captain
- Unit: 1st Louisiana Native Guard
- Conflicts: American Civil War; Siege of Port Hudson

André Cailloux (August 25, 1825 – May 27, 1863) was an African American army captain, one of the first black officers of any North American military unit. He was also one of the first black soldiers to die in combat during the American Civil War. He was killed during the unsuccessful first attack on the Confederate fortifications during the siege of Port Hudson. Accounts of his heroism were widely reported in the press, and became a rallying cry for the recruitment of African Americans into the Union Army.

His reputation as a patriot and martyr long outlived him. In an 1890 collection of interviews, Civil War veteran Colonel Douglass Wilson said, "If ever patriotic heroism deserved to be honored in stately marble or in brass that of Captain Caillioux deserves to be, and the American people will have never redeemed their gratitude to genuine patriotism until that debt is paid."

== Biography ==
=== Early life ===
Born enslaved in Louisiana in 1825, Cailloux lived his entire life in and around New Orleans. As a young man, Cailloux had been apprenticed in the cigar-making trade. He was owned by members of the Duvernay family until 1846. His petition at age 21 for manumission was supported by his master and was granted by an all-white police jury in the city of New Orleans.

There was an established community of free people of color in New Orleans, who were descended from both European and African Creoles (born in North America). This group became established during the French colonial years and enjoyed some rights as a third class between the white colonists and the majority of enslaved Africans. In New Orleans culture under the plaçage system, white men took women of color as common-law wives. Sometimes they acknowledged their mixed-race children and paid for their education, especially for their sons, or arranged apprenticeships for adult skills. Sometimes they settled property on them.

In 1847, Cailloux married Félicie Coulon, a free Creole of color. Although born into slavery, she had been freed by her mother paying her purchase price to her master. Cailloux and Coulon had four children born free, three of whom survived to adulthood. Félicie's mother Feliciana had been an enslaved mulatto woman. For several years, after she had already borne Félicie, she was held by and served as the common-law wife of her master Valentin Encalada, a white planter. Félicie was Encalada's "property" as the child of her mother. (This was according to the principle of partus sequitur ventrem in slave law.) Feliciana bought her daughter's freedom from Encalada in 1842.

=== Freedman ===
Upon gaining his freedom, Cailloux earned his living as a cigar maker. Prior to the Civil War, he established his own cigar-making business. Though his financial circumstances were modest, Cailloux became recognized as a leader within the community of free people of color in New Orleans, as well as in the Black Catholic community.

An avid sportsman, Cailloux was admired as one of the best boxers in the city. He was also an active supporter of the Institute Catholique, a school for orphaned black children. It also taught the children of free people of color. After his manumission, Cailloux learned to read, probably with the assistance of the teachers at the Institute Catholique. He became fluent in both English and French.

By 1860, Cailloux was a well-respected member of the 10,000 "free men of color" community in New Orleans. At the time, New Orleans was the largest city in the South and the sixth-largest city in the United States, with a population of about 100,000. In 1861, Cailloux's shoppe was on the corner of Casa Calvo and Union.

=== American Civil War service ===
==== Confederate States Army ====
At the outbreak of the Civil War in 1861, Cailloux was commissioned as a lieutenant in the Native Guard, a state militia organized to defend the city of New Orleans. Free men of color had participated in the local militia since the time of French colonial rule. He was one of the first black officers of any North American unit.

The Native Guard was made up entirely of free men of color who resided in and around New Orleans. Through articles in local New Orleans' newspapers, approximately 1,500 free men of color volunteered for the regiment and petitioned the governor for inclusion in Louisiana's regular militia, which was approved. Under the command of a white officer, all the companies of the Confederate Native Guard were led by free men of color and all officers were elected by the all-volunteer force. The Confederate government of the state of Louisiana provided no allowance for uniforms or equipment. Cailloux took his responsibilities seriously. His unit was observed to be well drilled and well trained.

The Confederate Native Guard were never called to active duty. When Union Admiral David Farragut captured the city of New Orleans in April 1862, the Confederate forces in and around New Orleans abandoned the city and moved north to Camp Moore. The 1st Native Guard disbanded at this time, formally, on the grounds of the U.S. Mint at the edge of the French Quarter.

==== Union Army ====
Union General Benjamin F. Butler, military commander of the Department of the Gulf, made his headquarters in New Orleans. In September 1862 he ordered the organizing of an all-black Union Army 1st Louisiana Native Guard regiment. Unlike the Confederate unit, this regiment had a mixture of free-men and former slaves and was formed as the direct result of General Butler's requests for reinforcements for The Army of the Gulf falling on deaf ears. In Butler's memoirs, and in the Record of the War of the Rebellion, he wrote to Secretary of War Stanton, "If you will not send me reinforcements, then I will call upon Africa to do so."

Cailloux joined the 1st regiment, which was necessary as many of those serving only spoke French, and was commissioned as captain of Company E. His company was considered one of the best drilled in the Native Guard. Cailloux gradually earned the respect of Colonel Spencer Stafford, the white officer who commanded the regiment. When General Nathaniel P. Banks replaced Butler as Commander of the Department of the Gulf in December 1862, he brought with him an additional 30,000 troops, bringing the total troop strength under his command to 42,000.

By this time, the all-black Native Guard had grown to three regiments, a mixture of free-men and former slaves. Although the line officers (lieutenants and captains) were black, including future Governor P. B. S. Pinchback, a Company Commander of the 2nd Regiment, the commanding officers (colonels, lieutenant colonels, and majors) were white. General Banks despised the black officers and considered them an insult to the U.S. Army. He set out to replace all black officers with white ones, and generally accomplished this with the 2nd and 3rd Regiments, but not with the 1st Regiment, in which Cailloux served and had become an officer himself.

Many members of the 1st Regiment had also been members of the Confederate 1st Native Guard, and Cailloux and the other officers were not willing to resign and leave them in the hands of the New England officers who were widely mistreating black soldiers under their command in the other two regiments.

The 1st Regiment of the Native Guard was assigned primarily to fatigue duty (chopping wood, digging trenches) until May 1863, when General Banks moved most of his army (35,000 men) into a position to surround the Confederate fortifications at Port Hudson, Louisiana. Port Hudson was a strategically located fort on a bend in the Mississippi River just 20 miles (32 km) north of Baton Rouge. At the time, the Confederacy still controlled the 200-mile stretch of the Mississippi River between Vicksburg, Mississippi, in the north and Port Hudson in the south. The Union wanted to gain control of Vicksburg, which had a strategic position on a bluff, in order to control the Mississippi.

While General Ulysses Grant laid siege to Vicksburg, General Banks conducted the siege of Port Hudson.

==== Siege of Port Hudson ====
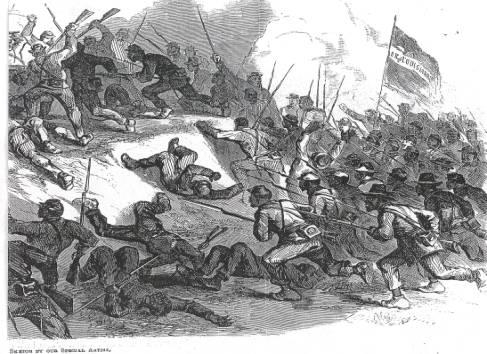
A depiction of the last minutes of André Cailloux in battle. He is shown at the top of the image, looking back at his troops and with his sword raised. This portrayal places Cailloux and his men much closer to the Confederates than they were. From Frank Leslie's Journal, June 27, 1863.

On May 27, 1863, Banks launched a poorly coordinated attack on the well-defended, well-fortified Confederate positions at Port Hudson. As part of the attack the first day, Cailloux was ordered to lead his company of 100 men in an almost suicidal assault against a high redoubt manned by two regiments of Confederate troops with heavy artillery support. Despite his company suffering heavy casualties, Cailloux, shouting encouragement to his men in French and English, led the charge of his entire regiment, a Minié ball tore through his arm, leaving it hanging useless at his side. Severely wounded, Cailloux continued to lead the charge until a Confederate artillery shell struck him, nearly tearing him in two and killing him. Despite stories to the contrary, there was only one charge made by the Native Guard on this most Northern set of works at Port Hudson.

His actions were described in a rather fanciful fashion by Rodolphe Desdunes, whose brother, Aristide, served under Cailloux:

The eyes of the world were indeed on this American Spartacus [Cailloux]. The hero of ancient Rome displayed no braver heroism than did this officer who ran forward to his death with a smile on his lips and crying, "Let us go forward, O comrades!" Six times he threw himself against the murderous batteries of Port Hudson, and in each assault he repeated his urgent call, "Let us go forward, for one more time!" Finally, falling under the mortal blow, he gave his last order to his attending officer, "Bacchus, take charge!" If anyone should say the knightly Bayard did better or more, according to history, he lies.

Confederate General Gardner later asked for a truce along the northern front of the Port Hudson works so that the bodies of the slain members of the Native Guard could be recovered. General Banks responded that "I have no casualties in that area" and denied the request for a truce. As a result of this, Cailloux's decomposing body lay on the ground for 47 days until Port Hudson finally surrendered to Banks on July 9, 1863. Few of the dead were identified, but Cailloux's body was identified by a ring he wore which was recognized by surviving members of his regiment.

Most of the Union dead were buried in the area. This was later established as Port Hudson National Cemetery. In 1974 the cemetery was designated as a National Historic Landmark.

== Funeral ==
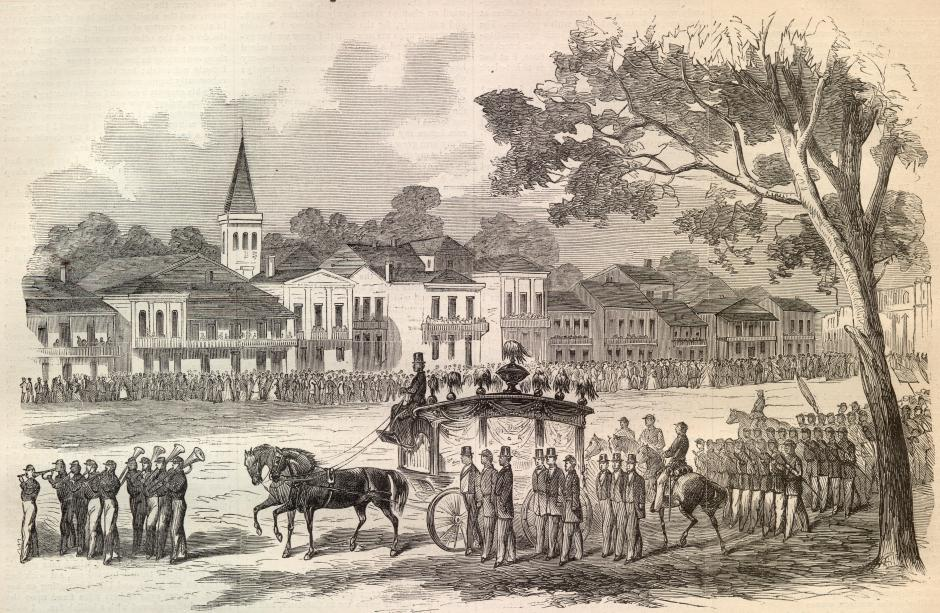
Funeral of André Cailloux in New Orleans, July 29, 1863, from the August 29, 1863, edition of Harpers Weekly

Cailloux's remains were recovered and returned to New Orleans. The story of the captain's heroism had preceded this. When his funeral was held in the city on July 29, 1863, Cailloux was honored by a long procession and thousands of attendees. His widow Felicie had asked Fr. Claude Paschal Maistre to officiate, despite an interdict against the priest from Bishop Jean-Marie Odin, who supported the Confederate cause. Born in France, Maistre was the only Catholic priest in the area to support the abolition of slavery. He conducted the funeral despite his ban, and Cailloux was buried in Saint Louis Cemetery #2.

After Cailloux's death, his widow, Félicie, struggled to receive the financial benefits promised to veterans by the United States government. After several years of effort, she received a small pension, but she died in poverty in 1874. She was working at the time as a domestic servant for Fr. Maistre.

== Legacy ==
In 2022, St. Rose de Lima, the former Catholic church in New Orleans that Father Maistre presided over became the André Cailloux Center for Performing Arts and Cultural Justice. A small park near the center has also been renamed after Cailloux.

=== Media portrayals ===
In 2020, Cailloux's story was made into an eponymous short film, directed by Dane Moreton.

In 2022, Cailloux was a featured character in the film Emancipation, played by Mustafa Shakir.

== See also ==
- Military history of African Americans in the American Civil War
