= 78th United States Colored Infantry Regiment =

- Active: 1863–1866
- Country: United States
- Allegiance: United States Union
- Branch: Infantry; United States Colored Troops
- Size: Regiment
- Engagements: American Civil War

The 78th United States Colored Infantry Regiment, originally known as the 6th Corps d'Afrique Infantry was a regiment composed of African-American troops recruited from Louisiana that served in the Union Army during the American Civil War. The 78th Regiment was posted on garrison duty in Louisiana before being mustered out of service in 1866.

== History ==
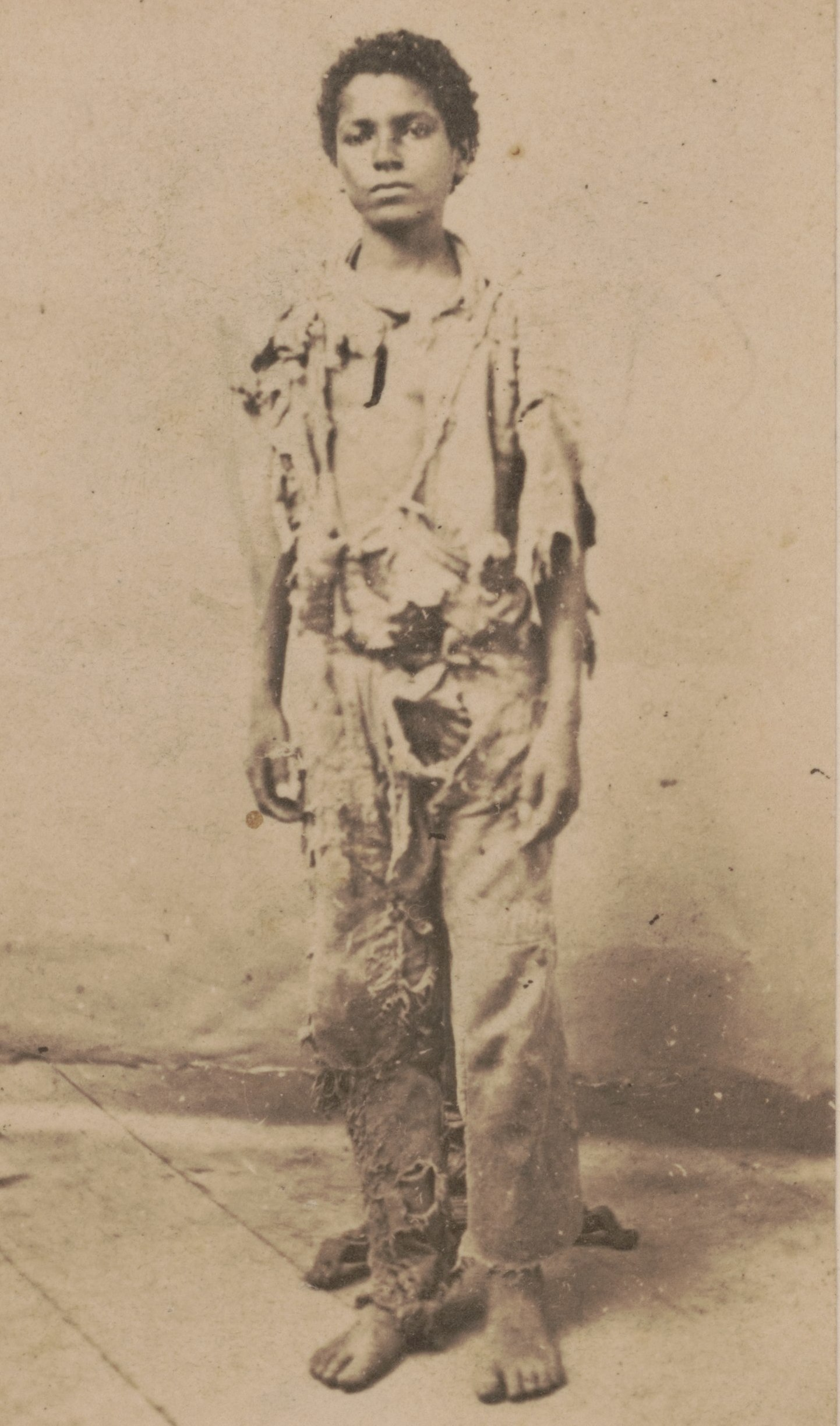
Taylor, young drummer boy for 78th Colored Troops Infantry, in rags

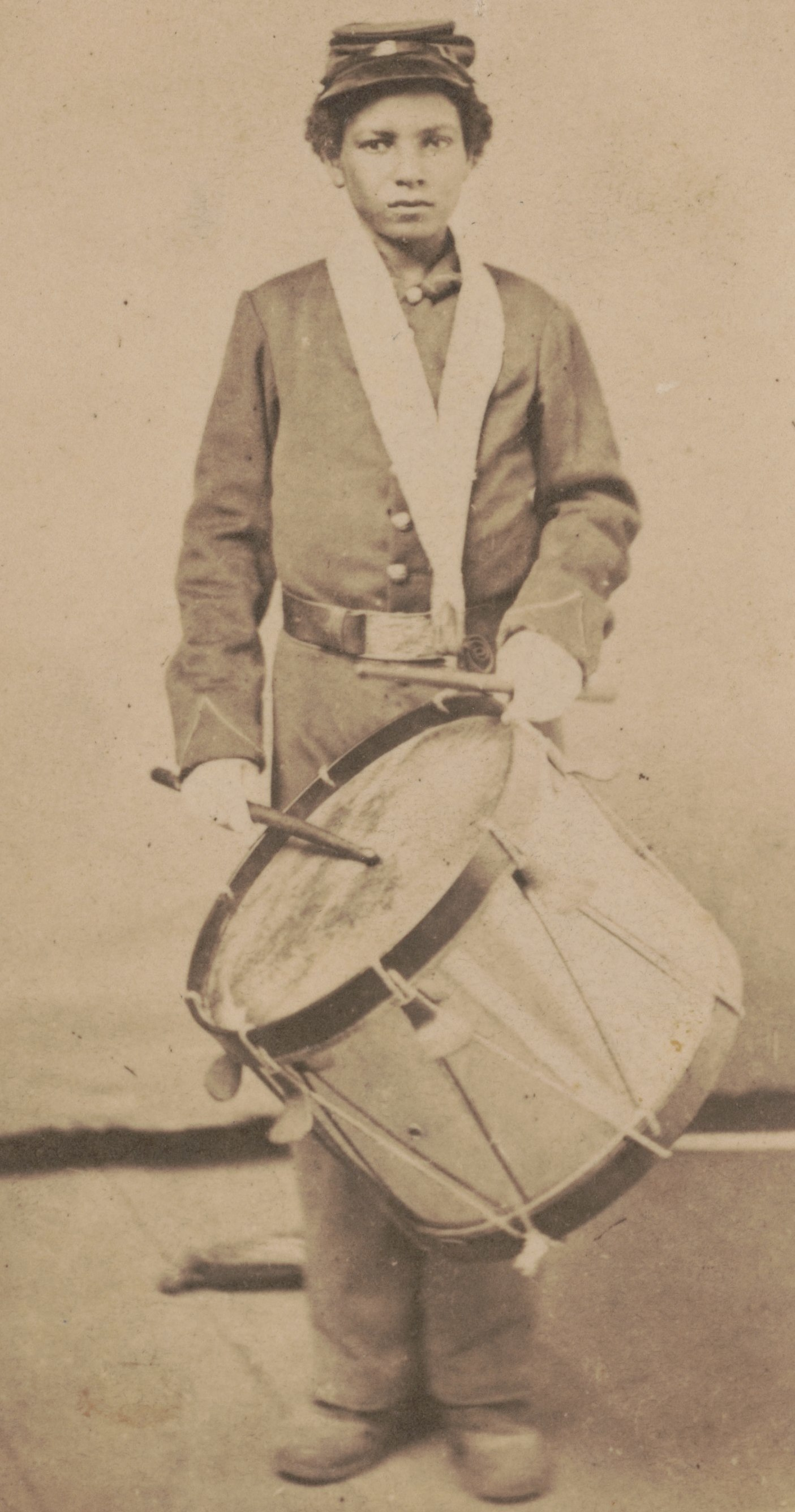
Taylor, young drummer boy for 78th Colored Troops Infantry, in uniform with drum

Originally formed as the 6th Corps d'Afrique Infantry on September 4, 1863, at Port Hudson, Louisiana, the regiment was renamed the 78th US Colored Infantry Regiment in April, 1864.

Most of the soldiers recruited to join the Corps d'Afrique were newly-freed slaves from Louisiana, many of whom only spoke French, which presented a challenge for army officers from the North tasked with training them. In July 1863, two officers of the 6th Corps d'Afrique wrote to a Northern abolitionist about the recruits they encountered in Louisiana: “They are brought into camp or to the medical examiner in droves from six to two hundred, hastily past without judgement in regard to their fitness for discipline or soldierly bearing, many of them ungainly, and too degraided [sic] to be souldiers [sic], as well as entirely unacquainted with the English language. No exertion on the part of the instructor, can ever make of this class effectual men for an army." Despite these concerns, the 6th Corps d'Afrique was operational by the fall of 1864, assigned to garrison duty at Port Hudson, a stronghold along the Mississippi River captured from Confederate forces earlier that summer.

On August 3, 1863, a contingent from the 6th Corps d'Afrique was sent on a recruiting mission to Jackson, Louisiana, north of Port Hudson. These recruiting drives often resembled press-gangs, with any able-bodied African-American men found on local plantations coerced into joining the army. During this mission a group of approximately 500 Confederate cavalry attacked the Union force, inflicting casualties of 2 killed, 6 wounded, and 9 missing on the men of the 6th Corps d'Afrique.

The commanding officers of the 6th Corps d'Afrique/78th US Colored Troops were Colonel Charles L. Norton and Lieutenant Colonel Jasper Hutchings. All officers of the US Colored Troops during the Civil War were white; Black soldiers would not be commissioned as officers in the US Army until after the war.

Redesignated as the 78th USCT in 1864, the regiment spent the duration of the war at Port Hudson. US Colored Troops regiments were commonly assigned to garrison duties to hold strategic points along the Mississippi River and free up veteran Union regiments for service elsewhere. General Henry Halleck wrote to Ulysses S. Grant, in July 1863, shortly after the capture of Vicksburg, expressing his opinion that the regiments of freshly-recruited Black troops would be suitable for this assignment: “The Mississippi should be the base of future operations east and west. When Port Hudson falls, the fortifications of that place, as well as of Vicksburg, should be so arranged as to be held by the smallest possible garrisons, thus leaving the mass of troops for operations in the field. I suggest that colored troops be used as far as possible in the garrisons."

The 98th USCT Infantry Regiment was consolidated with the 78th on August 1, 1865. This consolidated regiment was mustered out of service on January 6, 1866.

== See also ==
- List of United States Colored Troops Civil War Units
- United States Colored Troops
- List of Louisiana Union Civil War units
