= William Wilson (poet) =

American poet (1801–1860)

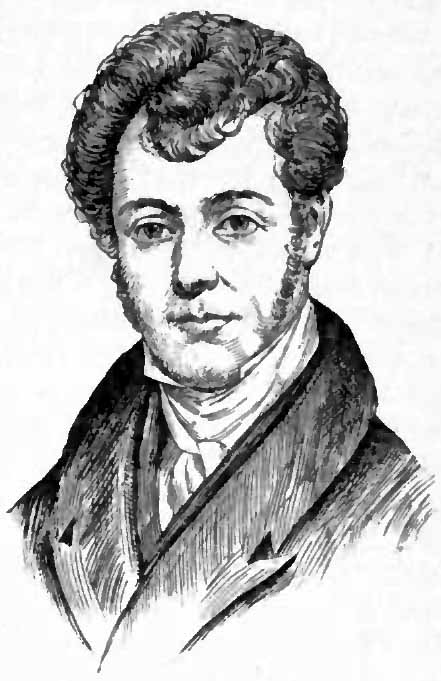
- Drawing by Jacques Reich based on a portrait by John Watson Gordon.

William Wilson (25 December 1801 – 25 August 1860) was a Scottish-American poet, bookseller and publisher.

== Biography ==
Wilson was born in Perthshire, Scotland. At an early age he was imbued with a passionate love of poetry, derived from his mother, who sang the Jacobite songs and ballads of her native land. While a boy he lost his father, the merchant's death being preceded by his failure in business. A bachelor uncle's fortune in Jamaica was in some way lost to his brother's children, for whom it was intended, so that Wilson's early life was accompanied by many deprivations, including the completion of his education. At 22, he became the editor of the Dundee Literary Olio, a large proportion of which he wrote, in both prose and verse.

By 1826, Wilson had married and moved with his wife to Edinburgh at the urging of influential friends; he became established in business, and joined the literary circle of Christopher North. That same year his young wife died, and he expressed his sorrow in poetry. In 1830, Wilson married Miss Sibbald, of Borthaugh, a descendant of Sir Andrew Sibbald and a niece of James Sibbald, the literary antiquary and editor of the Chronicle of Scottish Poetry, also the friend of Robert Burns. They had three sons together.

Wilson published poems in the Edinburgh Literary Journal and other leading periodicals. At this period, the young poet's charming conversation and manners made him a welcome guest in the literary circles of Edinburgh. At the house of Mrs. Anne Grant, of Loch Laggan, he was a constant visitor, and she owned his portrait by Sir John Watson Gordon.

When 32 years of age, Wilson and his wife emigrated to the United States and settled at Poughkeepsie, New York, on the Hudson River. He was a bookseller and publisher, which he continued till his death, a portion of the time in partnership with the elder brother of Bishops Alonzo and Horatio Potter, and later with his son, James Grant. Wilson occasionally contributed in prose and verse — generally anonymously — to various American periodicals. Sometimes he sent contributions to the British Blackwood or Chambers's Journal. Selections of his poems appeared in The Cabinet, Modern Scottish Minstrel, and Henry Wadsworth Longfellow's Poems of Places, but he never issued them in a volume.

Wilson died in Poughkeepsie. It was not till 1869 that a portion of his poems were published in Poughkeepsie with a memoir by Benson J. Lossing. A second edition, with additional poems, appeared in 1875, and a third in 1884. Willis pronounced one of Wilson's poems "the best modern imitation of the old ballad style that he had ever met with," and William Cullen Bryant said "the song in which the writer personates Richard the Lion-hearted during his imprisonment is more spirited than any of the ballads of Aytoun."

All of Wilson's sons by his second marriage served in the Civil War: James attained the rank of brevet brigadier general; the second fell at the head of his company at Fredericksburg, Virginia; and the youngest, leaving his studies at 16, volunteered with several of his classmates and went to the front.
