= Daniel Ullman =

American politician and Civil War Union general (1810–1892)

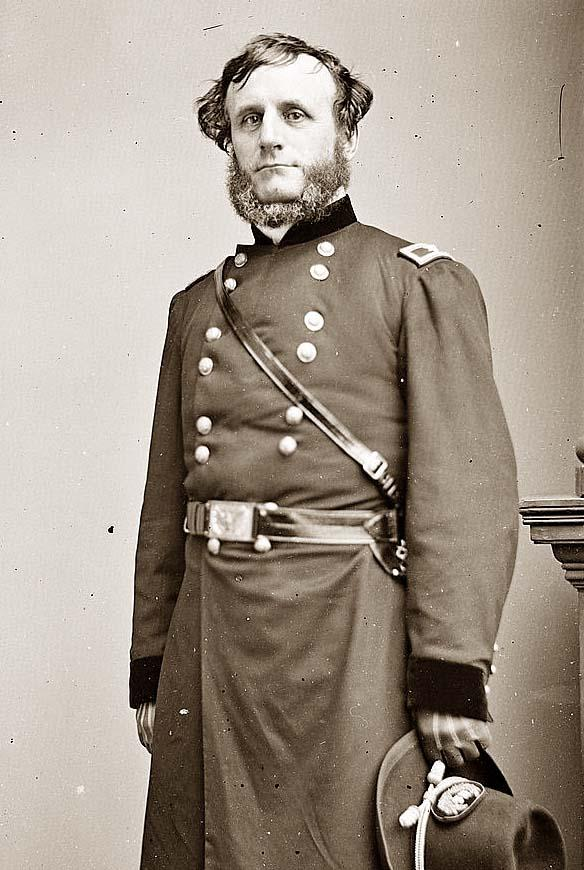
- Daniel Ulllman in uniform
- Born: April 28, 1810; Wilmington, Delaware
- Died: September 20, 1892 (aged 82); Nyack, New York
- Burial place: Oak Hill Cemetery, Nyack, New York
- Military career
- Allegiance: United States of America
- Branch: United States Army; Union Army
- Service years: 1862–1865
- Rank: Brigadier General; Brevet Major General
- Commands: 78th New York Infantry Regiment; Corps d'Afrique; District of Port Hudson; 1st Division, U.S. Colored Infantry; District of Morganza
- Conflicts: American Civil War Battle of Cedar Mountain Siege of Port Hudson

Daniel Ullman, also spelled Ullmann (April 28, 1810 – September 20, 1892), was an American lawyer and politician from New York. He also served as a Union Army general in the American Civil War, raising and leading colored troops.

== Political career ==
Born in Wilmington, Delaware, Ullman graduated from Yale University in 1829 and moved to New York City, where he began practicing law. A member of the Whig Party, he became a prominent member of the faction opposed to the leadership of William H. Seward. A frequent candidate for office, his most notable campaign was as the American Party candidate for the governorship of New York in 1854, in which he won 26% of the vote.

== Witness in the Burdell–Cunningham Trial ==
In late 1856, Ullman moved into a boarding house that was run by Mrs. Emma Augusta Cunningham at 31 Bond Street in Manhattan. The attorney did not really socialize much with his fellow lodgers, but he attended a party held in the boarding house on January 14, 1857. Although he later testified that he only spent half an hour at the party, he admitted seeing people there whom he recognized as respectable. He probably saw two of his fellow lodgers, Dr. Harvey Burdell and Mr. John Eckel. Burdell, a wealthy dentist, had been having a close relationship with Mrs. Cunningham.

How close would be a subject of dispute. She claimed she married him, and would later try to pass off a hired baby as her own by him. Mrs. Cunningham also seemed to be carrying on a close relationship with Mr. Eckel. On January 31, 1857, Burdell would be stabbed to death by an intruder while at his desk in the boarding house. Suspicion fell on Mrs. Cunningham and Mr. Eckel, and a coroner's court was held to examine the evidence regarding the murder. Mr. Ullman was a witness (oddly he had come home late, heard nothing unusual, and went to his room, so he was not suspected).

The next morning, he was awakened by the noise of the police and Mrs. Cunningham and others upon the discovery of Dr. Burdell's body. Ullman's testimony would be relatively trivial, except that he claimed Mrs. Cunningham did show grief and horror at the event. The Coroner's Court was presided over by Coroner Edward Connory, an Irish immigrant who enjoyed teasing Mr. Ullman, who was good-natured enough to return the banter. Cunningham and Eckel were both tried for the murder of Burdell, and prosecuted by New York City's District Attorney A. Oakey Hall later Mayor of the city. They were acquitted. The case was never solved.

Ullman's experience as an unexpected witness in a famous unsolved New York City murder mystery was somewhat repeated in 1870, when Major General Francis Preston Blair Jr. was a witness to members of the family of Benjamin Nathan running out of their home for help when they found Mr. Nathan murdered. The Nathan home was on West 23rd Street in Manhattan. General Blair was in bed in a hotel across the street and was awakened by the cries of the Nathan family members. Blair had been the running mate to former New York Governor Horatio Seymour when they ran for President and Vice President against Ulysses Grant and Schuyler Colfax in 1868. Seymour had run for re-election to his first term as Governor of New York in 1854, and was defeated by Myron Clark due, in part, to the third party candidacy of Ullman as the Know Nothing Candidate running such a successful campaign.

== Civil War service ==
During the Civil War, Ullman became colonel of the 78th New York Infantry Regiment. Captured at the Battle of Cedar Mountain in August 1862, he was detained at Libby Prison until he was paroled two months later. He later approached President Abraham Lincoln about the possibility of enlisting African Americans as soldiers. After subsequent discussion, in January 1863, Ullman was promoted to brigadier general and sent to Louisiana, where he raised five regiments of African Americans as soldiers in a unit that was designated the Corps d'Afrique. He now commanded a brigade made up of those colored infantry regiments and a regiment of colored engineers.

Ullman led his men into the siege of Port Hudson, where they suffered heavy casualties. Afterward, he commanded the District of Port Hudson and continued to lead colored troops for the rest of the war, having a full division in mid-1864. He developed an alcohol problem, which led to his being relieved of his command shortly before the war ended. Ullman was mustered out in August 1865 and was made a brevet Major General for his war service.

== Post war ==
Ullman died in Nyack, New York in September 1892.

Ullman was Jewish.

Party political offices
| First | Know Nothing nominee for Governor of New York; 1854 | Succeeded by Erastus Brooks |
