= 2nd New Orleans Infantry Regiment =

2nd Louisiana Regiment New Orleans Infantry
- Active: 1864
- Country: United States of America
- Allegiance: USA
- Branch: Union Army
- Type: Infantry
- Engagements: American Civil War

The 2nd New Orleans Infantry Regiment was a regiment in the Union Army during the American Civil War.

The regiment was established at New Orleans, Louisiana, in early 1864, and was on garrison and guard duty in the New Orleans defenses. It operated at Calcasieu Pass between May 6 and 10. The unit was disbanded on August 4, its organization incomplete, and its men transferred to the 1st New Orleans Infantry Regiment.

== See also ==
- List of Louisiana Union Civil War units
