= 7th Louisiana Colored Infantry Regiment =

7th Louisiana Regiment Infantry (African Descent)
- Active: 1863–1864
- Country: United States of America
- Allegiance: USA
- Branch: Union Army, American Civil War
- Type: Infantry

The 7th Louisiana Regiment Infantry (African Descent) was a regiment in the Union Army during the American Civil War. The regiment served in Mississippi, Louisiana and Arkansas and mustered out March 13, 1866.

== Service in the District of Vicksburg ==
The regiment was first organized and on duty in New Orleans, Louisiana for 60 days from July 10 to August 6, 1863. The regiment was organized once more at Memphis, Tennessee, Holly Springs, Mississippi and Island No.10, in December 1863 and was on post duty at Vicksburg until March 1864. The unit was involved in a skirmish at Vidalia, Louisiana on February 7, 1864.

== 64th Regiment Infantry U.S. Colored Troops ==
The designation of the unit was changed to the 64th Regiment Infantry U.S. Colored Troops on March 11, 1864.

== See also ==
- List of Louisiana Union Civil War units
- Caesar Antoine - Captain of Company I
