= 2nd Louisiana Infantry Regiment (Union) =

- Active: September 29, 1862 – September 11, 1865
- Country: United States of America
- Allegiance: USA
- Branch: Union Army, American Civil War
- Type: Infantry
- Engagements: Plains Store; Port Hudson; 2nd Sabine Pass; Red River Campaign; Cane River Crossing; Sabine Crossroads; Pleasant Hill; Yellow Bayou

Commanders
- Commander: Col. Charles Jackson Paine

The 2nd Louisiana Infantry Regiment, also known after September 1863 as the 2nd Louisiana (US) Mounted Infantry, was a unit in the Union Army during the American Civil War. The regiment served in the Union Army XIX Corps in Louisiana throughout the war.

== Service ==
The regiment was organized in New Orleans in September 1862 and then moved to Baton Rouge in January 1863. The unit participated in the Siege of Port Hudson beginning with action in May 1863 and culminating with the surrender of the Confederate garrison on July 9, 1863. The regiment fought in the Second Battle of Sabine Pass on September 8, 1863.

The regiment was mounted in September 1863. In 1864, the regiment fought as part of the Cavalry Division in the Red River Campaign between March and May and then returned to New Orleans in August. The unit was in Baton Rouge or New Orleans until it mustered out on September 11, 1865.

== See also ==
- Port Hudson order of battle
- List of Louisiana Union Civil War units
