= Army of the Gulf =

Union Field Army during the American Civil War

- Active: 1862–1865
- Country: United States of America
- Branch: United States Army
- Type: Field Army
- Engagements: American Civil War

The Army of the Gulf was a Union Army that served in the general area of the Gulf states controlled by Union forces. It mainly saw action in Louisiana and Alabama.

== History ==
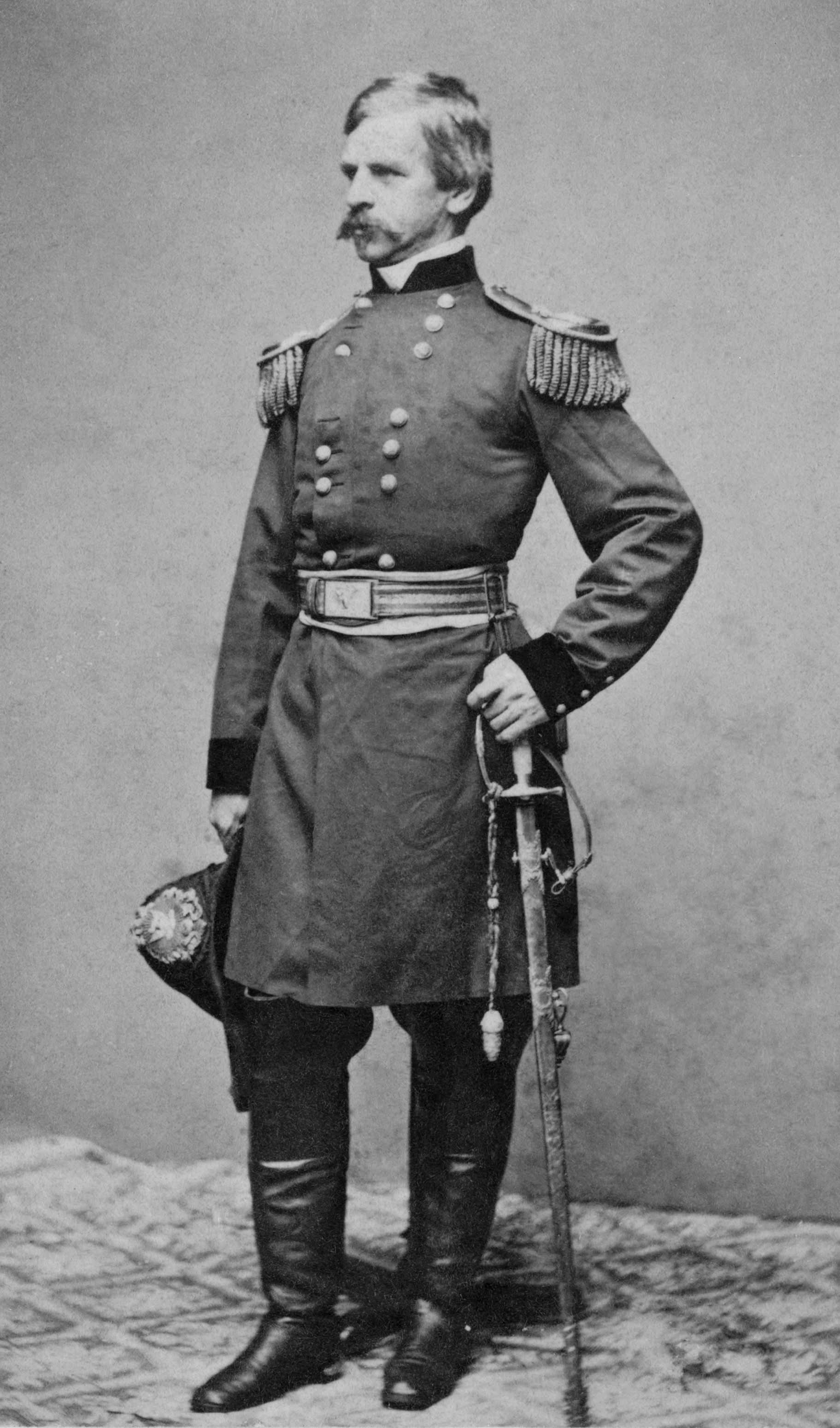
General Nathaniel P. Banks commanded the Army of the Gulf through many of its major operations

The Department of the Gulf was created following the capture of New Orleans by Admiral David G. Farragut in 1862. The commander of the Union occupation forces, Benjamin F. Butler, was placed in command of the department. In March, Butler assumed command of the department, and the Army of the Gulf was created from the troops now designated to the Department of the Gulf.

The army saw little action the rest of 1862 and Butler was replaced by Major General Nathaniel P. Banks on December 17. Banks assumed command of the Department of the Gulf and the Army of the Gulf. At the time the Army of the Gulf consisted of only one corps, the XIX Corps, which Banks was also appointed command of. Banks led the army in several engagements in lower Louisiana that eventually led to the Siege of Port Hudson, this army's first major engagement. The army endured the siege and the post was finally surrendered by Confederate forces on July 9, 1863. The next year the XIII Corps and two divisions of the XVI Corps were added to the department, increasing the army to over three corps. Banks retained command of the army and department while Gen. William H. Emory assumed command of the XIX Corps.

In March 1864, Banks began his disastrous Red River Campaign. After it failed, he resigned from the Army and was replaced by Maj. Gen. Stephen A. Hurlbut. The XIX Corps was sent to the Shenandoah Valley, and the forces that remained in the army participated in the land attack at the Battle of Mobile Bay.

Late in the war, Maj. Gen. Edward Canby's Military Division of West Mississippi was given the army's two remaining corps, the XIII and the XVI, for a planned offensive to capture the city of Mobile. During this operation, Canby renamed the force the Army of West Mississippi after the military division that he commanded. Although now under a different title, the force was virtually the same army and it took part in the Battle of Spanish Fort and the Battle of Fort Blakeley. Canby was appointed command of the Department of the Gulf at the closing of the war and the forces once again became the Army of the Gulf.

== Command history ==
Commander	From	To	Major Battles
Maj. Gen. Benjamin F. Butler	February 23, 1862	December 15, 1862	New Orleans
Maj. Gen. Nathaniel P. Banks	December 15, 1862	September 23, 1864	Fort Bisland, Irish Bend, Port Hudson, Red River Campaign
Maj. Gen. Stephen A. Hurlbut	September 23, 1864	April 22, 1865	temporary assignment
Maj. Gen. Edward Canby	June 3, 1865	June 27, 1865	

== Battle orders ==
- Port Hudson order of battle

== See also ==
- Army of West Mississippi
