= 50th United States Colored Infantry Regiment =

50th United States Colored Infantry Regiment 12th Louisiana Volunteers, African Descent
- Active: 1863–1865
- Country: United States
- Allegiance: United States Union
- Branch: Infantry; United States Colored Troops
- Size: Regiment
- Engagements: American Civil War: Battle of Fort Blakeley

The 50th United States Colored Infantry Regiment, originally known as the 12th Louisiana Volunteers, African Descent was a regiment composed of African-American troops recruited from Mississippi that served in the Union Army during the American Civil War. The regiment took part in the Battle of Fort Blakeley, which ended Confederate resistance along the Gulf coast.

== History ==
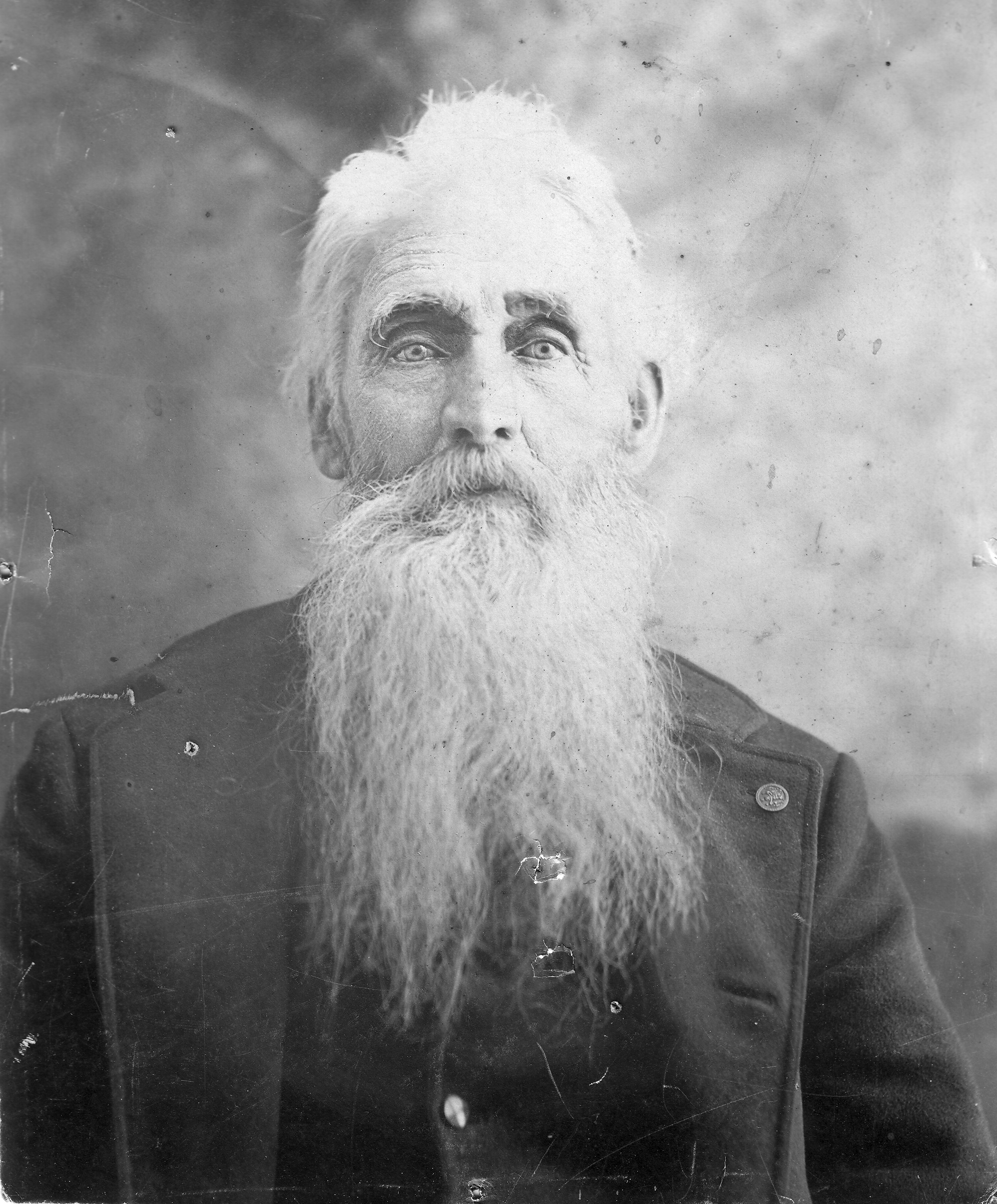
Captain Arthur Thomas King, 50th US Colored Troops

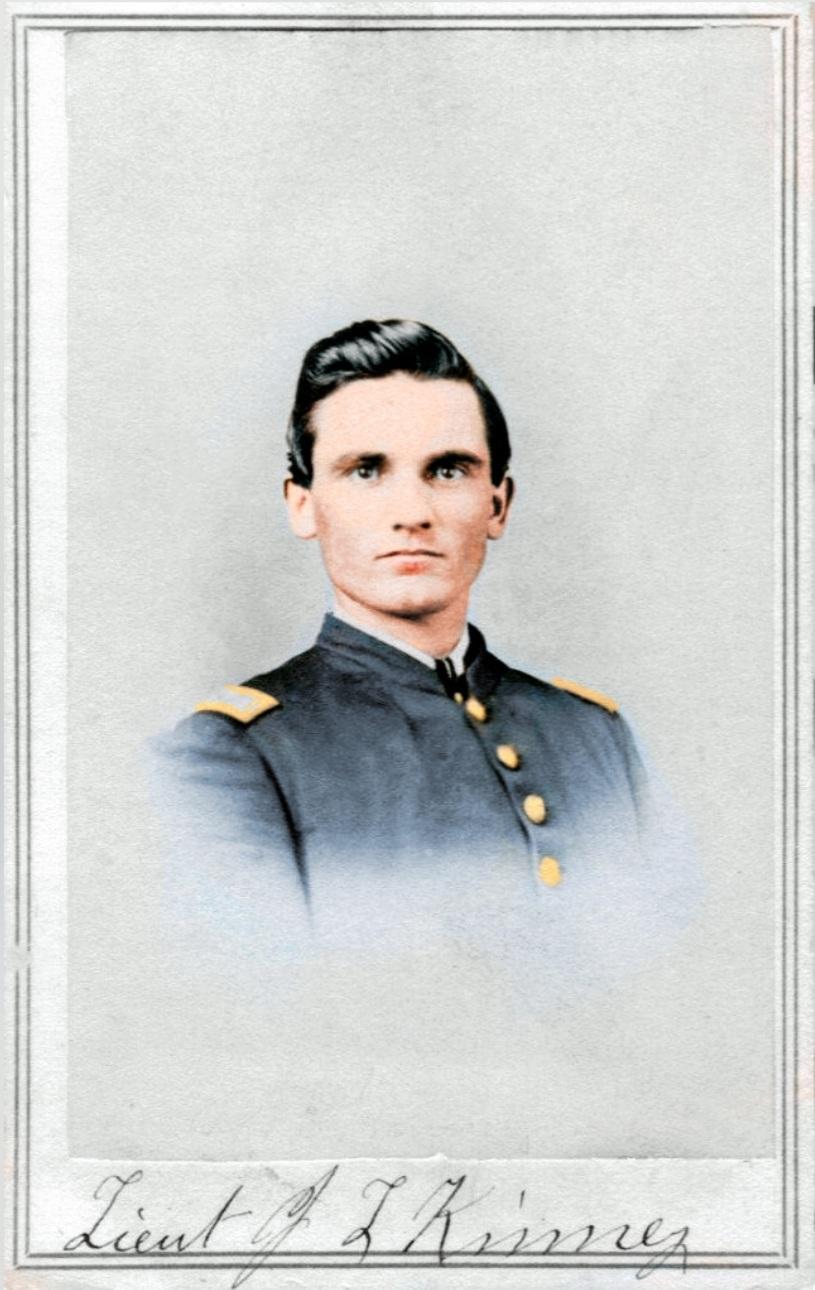
Lieutenant John L. Kinney, 50th US Colored Troops

The regiment was first organized in July 1863 as the 12th Louisiana Volunteers, African Descent at Vicksburg, Mississippi, which had recently been captured by Union troops following the Vicksburg Campaign. Despite the name of the regiment, most of the recruits were escaped slaves from Natchez, Mississippi. Fleeing to the Union lines seeking safety and freedom, many of these men were reported to be "half famished," and some died from disease before being properly enrolled in the army.

Newly-recruited regiments of US Colored Troops were assigned to garrison duties to hold strategic points along the Mississippi River and free up veteran Union regiments for service elsewhere. General Henry Halleck wrote to Ulysses S. Grant in July 1863, shortly after the capture of Vicksburg, expressing his opinion that the regiments of Black soldiers would be suitable for this assignment: “The Mississippi should be the base of future operations east and west. When Port Hudson falls, the fortifications of that place, as well as of Vicksburg, should be so arranged as to be held by the smallest possible garrisons, thus leaving the mass of troops for operations in the field. I suggest that colored troops be used as far as possible in the garrisons."

The name of the regiment was changed to the 50th US Colored Infantry on March 11, 1864. While stationed at Vicksburg the regiment took part in supply and logistics operations, such as bringing in contraband cotton and cattle from outlying plantations for the use of US forces. During one of these expeditions in March 1864, a soldier of the regiment was captured by Confederate forces and lynched.

In February 1865 the 50th Regiment travelled to Pensacola, Florida where it joined other Colored Troops regiments assembling there for a major operation. As part of a brigade led by Colonel Hiram Scofield, the 50th regiment marched overland towards Mobile, Alabama, one of the last large cities still in Confederate hands. This force took part in the Battle of Fort Blakeley, laying siege to the fort and assaulting the fortifications on April 9, successfully capturing it on the same day that General Robert E. Lee's Confederate forces in Virginia surrendered. The commander of the 50th Regiment, Colonel Charles Gilchrist, reported that his unit's actions under fire at Fort Blakeley were: "convincing proof that the former slaves of the South cannot be excelled as soldiers." During this battle the regiment lost 5 men killed and 20 wounded.

After the war ended, the 50th served on occupation duty at Mobile, Montgomery, New Orleans, and other locations along the Gulf coast. The regiment was mustered out of service on March 20, 1866.

== Commanders ==
Commanding officers of the 50th US Colored Troops infantry:

- Col. Charles A. Gilchrist, awarded brevet brigadier general, March 1865
- Lt. Col. Moses H. Tuttle
- Lt. Col. Robert S. Donaldson, transferred to 64th Colored Infantry, February 1865

== See also ==
- List of United States Colored Troops Civil War Units
- United States Colored Troops
- List of Louisiana Union Civil War units
