= 80th United States Colored Infantry Regiment =

19th century US army regiment

80th United States Colored Infantry Regiment 8th Corps d'Afrique Infantry Regiment
- Active: 1863–1867
- Country: United States
- Allegiance: United States Union
- Branch: Infantry; United States Colored Troops
- Size: Regiment
- Engagements: American Civil War

Commanders
- Notable commanders: Cyrus Hamlin

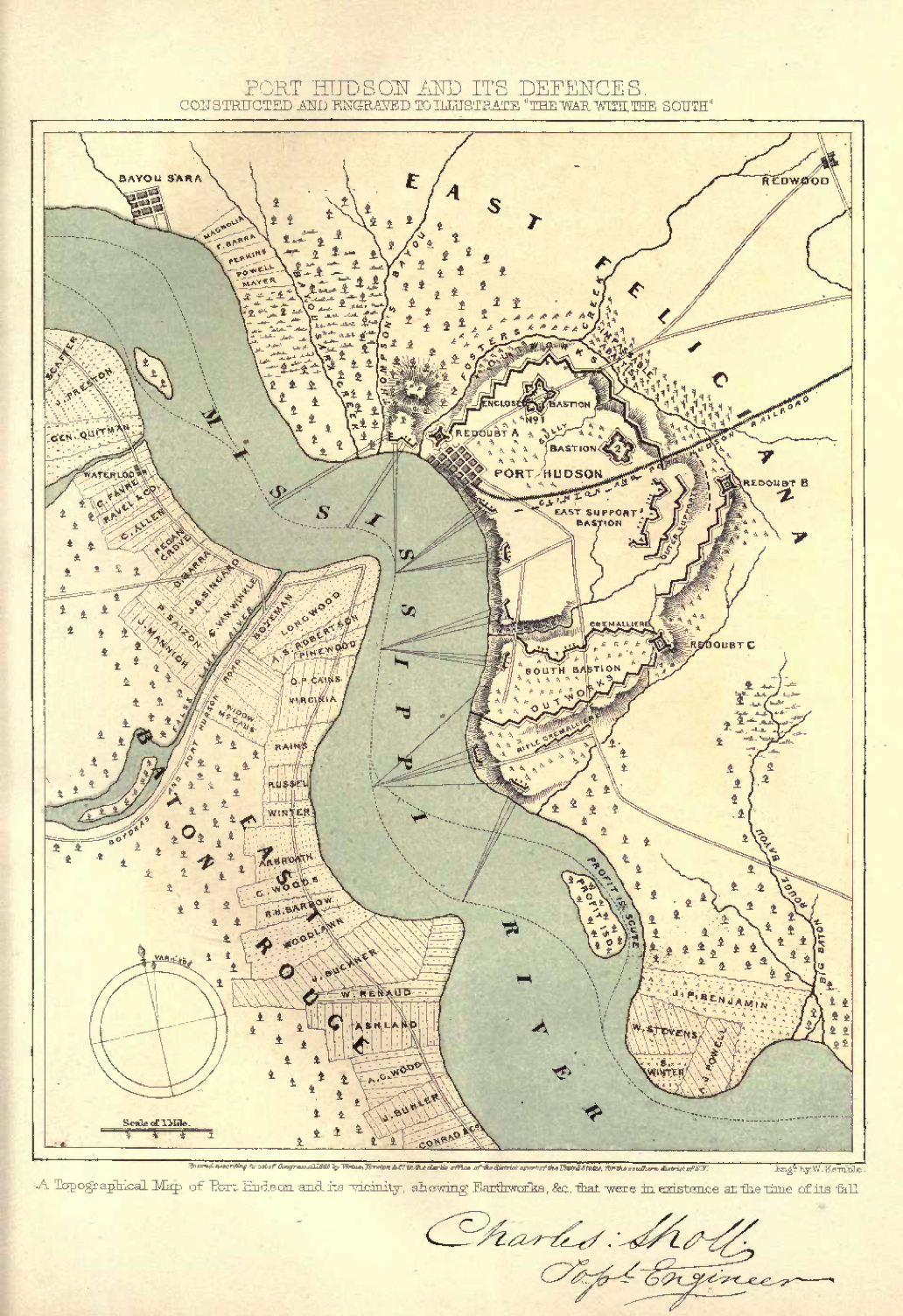
Port Hudson and its defences

The 80th United States Colored Infantry Regiment was an African-American unit of the United States Colored Troops during the American Civil War. Originally organized as the 8th Corps d'Afrique Infantry it was first formed in September 1863 at Port Hudson, Louisiana. The 80th Colored Infantry Regiment operated throughout Louisiana until 1866, when the troops were posted in Texas before mustering out in March 1867.

== History ==
On February 12, 1863, Cyrus Hamlin, the son of US Vice President Hannibal Hamlin, was appointed colonel of the yet-to-be organized 8th Corps d'Afrique Infantry. In the meantime, the Siege of Port Hudson occurred in July 1863, with Union forces successfully capturing this Confederate-held strongpoint along the Mississippi river. Port Hudson was then used as a major recruiting center for Black soldiers.

The regiment was attached to Daniel Ullman's Brigade of the Corps d'Afrique, Department of the Gulf until December 1863. It was then with the 2nd Brigade, 1st Division of the Corps d'Afrique until March 1864, when it was at the garrison at Port Hudson. On April 4, 1864, the regiment was designated the 80th United States Colored Infantry Regiment.

After the war, following further garrison duty in Louisiana and Texas, the regiment mustered out of service on March 1, 1867.

== Conditions ==
Two white soldiers from Alexandria were arrested after they tried to convince a Corporal of the 80th Colored Infantry to work in their fields. The regimental commander gave "them a good lecture on the altered condition of affairs, and the absurdity of attempting to treat colored soldiers as slaves."

During Reconstruction in 1866, the regiment was posted near Alexandria, Louisiana, where Lieutenant Colonel McFadden of the regiment reported "very little change," in Southern social attitudes, and that "Union men whether of northern or southern birth are living in extreme jeopardy of their lives."

== Commanders ==
Commanding officers of the 8th Corps d'Afrique/80th US Colored Infantry:

- Colonel Cyrus Hamlin, promoted to brigadier general, December 1864.
- Colonel William S. Mudgett, awarded brevet brigadier general, March 1865.
- Lieutenant Colonel Orrin McFadden

== Notable people ==
- Henry Demas, Louisiana politician and former slave

== See also ==
- List of United States Colored Troops Civil War units
