= 15th Illinois Cavalry Regiment =

15th Regiment, Illinois Volunteer Cavalry
- Illinois flag
- Active: 25 December 1862 to 31 August 1865
- Country: United States
- Allegiance: Union
- Branch: Cavalry

The 15th Regiment of the Illinois Volunteer Cavalry was a volunteer cavalry regiment that served in the Union Army during the American Civil War.

== History of service ==
The 15th Illinois Cavalry was organized at Aurora, Kane Co., Illinois on 2 Aug 1861 by Captain Albert Jenkins and was mustered on 23 September 1861 as Cavalry, attached to the Thirty-Sixth Illinois Volunteers.

On 24 September 1861, moved from camp, and reported to the Regiment, at Rolla, Missouri. On 31 December 1861, reported to Colonel Carr, commanding Third Illinois Cavalry, and moved to Bennett's Mills.

On 10 February 1862, moved to Osage Springs, Missouri., arriving on 20th. On 2 March 1862, moved, with Siegel's Division, to near Bentonville, losing 4 men taken prisoners. Was engaged, 7 and 8 March, at Pea Ridge. Moved, with the army, to Salem. On 1 May 1862, ordered to White River. Returned to Batesville, on the 9th. Was engaged in the movements of Asboth's Division, and arrived at Cape Girardeau, Missouri., 24 May 1862. Moved to Hamburg Landing, Tennessee. Was escort for General Rosecrans, at Battle of Corinth, 3 and 4 October. 25 December 1862, was assigned to the Fifteenth Illinois Cavalry.

On 9 June 1863, moved to Memphis. 20 May 1863, landed at Chickasaw Bayou, and was engaged in the operations against Vicksburg, with the Regiment. On 17 August 1862, moved to Carrollton, Louisiana. On 5 September 1862, moved, with Fourth Division, Thirteenth Army Corps, to Morganza, Louisiana and was engaged in the campaign, General Herron commanding. On 10 October 1863, returned to Carrollton. 15th, moved to Brashear, Louisiana., and, on 17th, to New Iberia, Louisiana.

Was engaged in scouting, and various expeditions, reporting to Brigadier General A. L. Lee, as escort, 5 January 1864. On 11 February 1864, the company moved for Illinois, for veteran furlough, and, on 26th, the men were furloughed at Chicago, Illinois.

The non-veteran members of the regiment mustered out on 31 July 1865 and the recruits and veterans were transferred to the 10th Regiment Illinois Volunteer Cavalry.

== Battles and campaigns ==
During their three years of service, the 15th Illinois Volunteer Cavalry Regiment saw action in Tennessee, Alabama, and Mississippi. A list of battle and campaigns they were engaged in include: Sherman's March to the Sea, Siege of Vicksburg, Siege of Corinth, Siege of Belmont, Battle of Chickamauga, Battle of Shiloh, Battle of Fort Henry and Fort Donelson, Battle of Resaca, Battle of Kenesaw Mountain, Battle of Perryville, Battle of Stones River, Tullahoma Campaign, Atlanta Campaign, Campaign of the Carolinas, Central Mississippi Campaign, New Madrid and Island #10 Campaign, and the Chattanooga Campaign.

== Total strength and casualties ==
The regiment suffered 2 officers and 12 enlisted men who were killed in action or who died of their wounds and 1 officer and 122 enlisted men who died of disease, for a total of 137 fatalities.

== Regimental officers ==
- Colonel Warren Stewart – killed in action near Vicksburg, Mississippi on 23 January 1863.
- Lieutenant Colonel George A. Bacon – mustered out with the regiment.
- Major James G. Wilson – transferred to the 4th U.S.C.T. Cavalry
- Captain William Ford – Company A Cavalry (known as Stewart's Independent Battalion Cavalry)
- Captain Egleton Carmichael – Company B (known as Carmichael's Cavalry Company)
- Captain James J. Dollins – Company C (known as Dollins' Cavalry Company)
- Captain Morrison J. O'Harnett – Company D (known as O'Harnett's Cavalry Company)
- Captain William D. Hutchens – Company E (known as Hutchen's Cavalry Company)
- Captain Joseph Adams – Company F
- Captain Franklin T. Gilbert – Company G (known as Gilbert's Cavalry Company)
- Captain William C. Wilder – Company H (known as Wilder's Cavalry Company)
- Captain Albert Jenks – Company I (known as Jenks Cavalry Dragoons)
- Captain Samuel B. Sherer – Company K (known as Sherer's Cavalry Company Dragoons)
- Captain William Ford – Company L (known as Ford's Cavalry Company)
- Captain Oscar H. Huntley – Company M
- Sargent [sic?] Henry Wilcox – Quartermaster
- Reverend Simeon Walker – Chaplain
- Dr. Josiah H Skilling – Surgeon
- Dr. David N. Moore – Surgeon
- Dr. Ezra M. Miller – Veterinary Surgeon

== See also ==
- List of Illinois Civil War Units
- Illinois in the American Civil War
