= 1st Louisiana Native Guard (Union) =

All-black regiment in the American Civil War

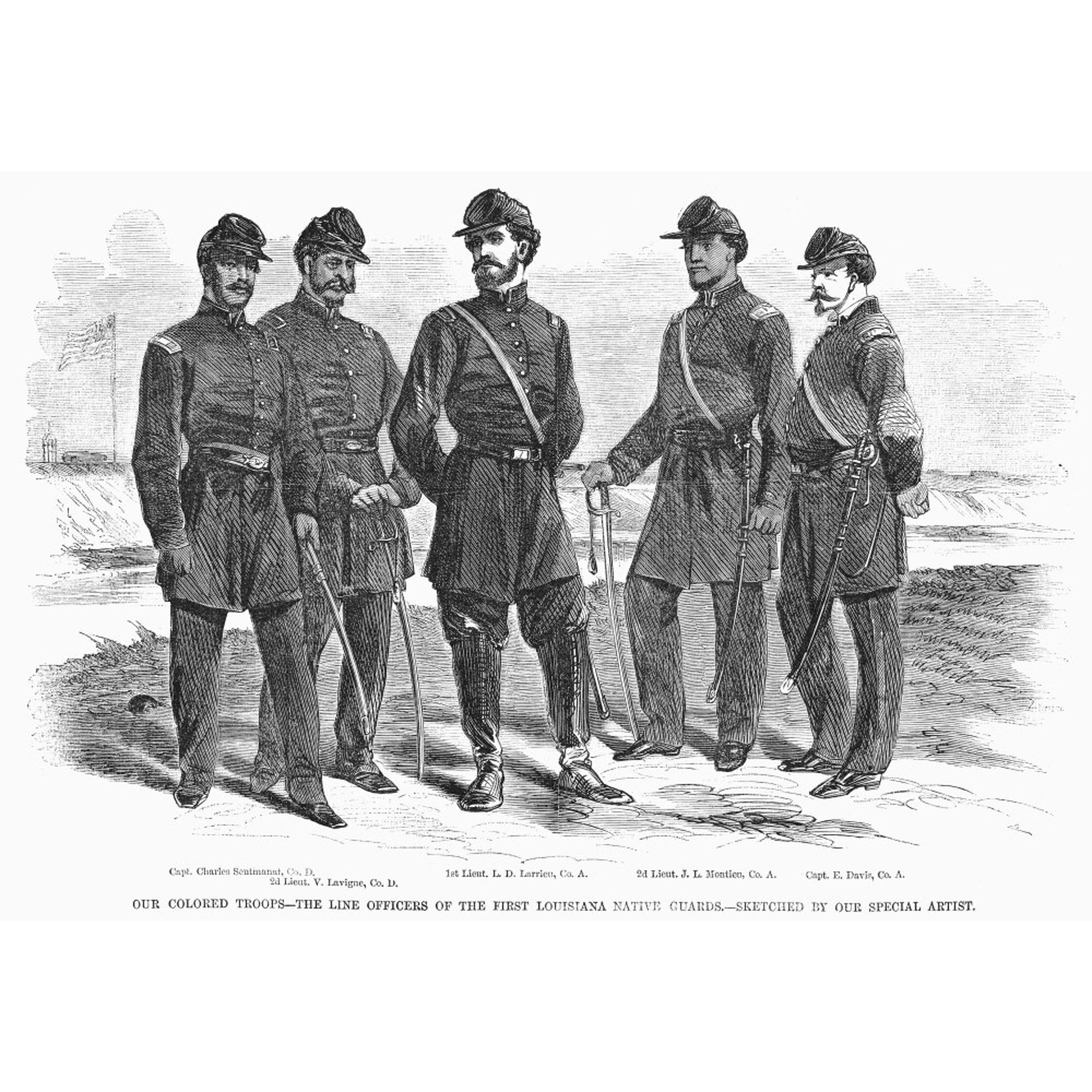
- Officers of the 1st Louisiana Native Guard
- Active: 1862–1864
- Disbanded: April 1864
- Country: United States (Union)
- Branch: United States Colored Troops
- Type: Infantry
- Garrison/HQ: New Orleans, Louisiana
- Facings: Light blue
- Engagements: American Civil War; Port Hudson

Commanders
- Notable commanders: Henry C. Merriam

The 1st Louisiana Native Guard (also known as the Corps d'Afrique) was the first all-black regiment in the Union army. Based in New Orleans, Louisiana, it played a prominent role in the Siege of Port Hudson. Its members included a minority of free men of color from New Orleans; most were African-American former slaves who had escaped to join the Union cause and gain freedom. A Confederate regiment by the same name served in the Louisiana militia made up entirely of free people of color.

== Formation ==
After New Orleans fell to Admiral David Farragut in April 1862, Union Major General Benjamin F. Butler headquartered his 12,000-man Army of the Gulf in New Orleans. On September 27, 1862, Butler organized the Union army's 1st Louisiana Native Guard, some of whose members had served in the previous Confederate Native Guard regiment. Free men of color had served with the militia since the French colonial period. But the regiment's initial strength was 1,000 men, and it was composed mostly of African-American former slaves who had escaped to freedom.

The Union 1st Louisiana Native Guard in September 1862 was not made up only of men from the Confederate Guard. Of the nearly 1,000 enlisted soldiers of the Confederate Native Guards, only 107 were recorded as enlisting in the Union "Native Guard", and only ten of the 36 officers served the Union. The free men of color had varying reasons for volunteering to serve with the Confederacy, in part to preserve their own standing in the society, just as others did.

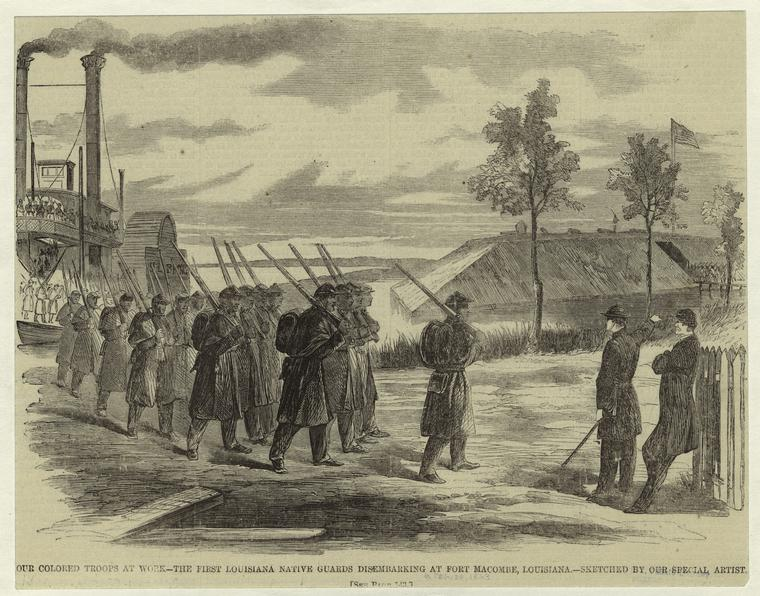
The Native Guard disembarking at Fort Macomb, Louisiana, for guard duty

The Union commissioned several African-American line officers of the Guard. Former Confederate Lt. André Cailloux, a Creole of color (free man of color) in New Orleans, was named captain of Company E. P. B. S. Pinchback, also a free man of color, was appointed as captain of Company A, and later was reassigned as company commander of the 2nd Regiment. (He later served as governor of the state, as a U.S. representative and senator.) James Lewis, former steward on the Confederate river-steamer De Soto, was commissioned as captain of company K. During this period, some slaves who escaped from nearby plantations joined the regiment, but the Union army's official policy discouraged such enrollments. In November 1862, the number of escaped slaves seeking to enlist became so great that the Union organized a second regiment and, a month later, a third regiment.

The field-grade officers of these regiments (colonels, lieutenant colonels, and majors) were white men, with the notable exception of Major Francis E. Dumas of the 2nd Regiment, a Creole of color. Colonel Spencer Stafford, formerly Butler's military "mayor" of New Orleans, was the original white commander of the 1st Louisiana Native Guard.

After Major-General Nathaniel P. Banks replaced Butler as Commander of the Department of the Gulf, he began a systematic campaign to purge all the black or colored line officers from the 1st, 2nd, and 3rd Regiments of the Louisiana Native Guard. He secured the resignations of all the black line officers in the 2nd Regiment in February 1863, but most of the black line officers in the 1st Regiment and 3rd Regiment remained.

== Siege of Port Hudson ==
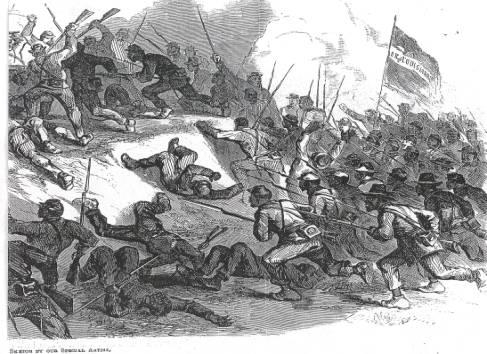
André Cailloux's death

From its formation in September 1862 until early May 1863, the 1st Louisiana Native Guard largely performed fatigue duty–chopping wood, gathering supplies, and digging earthworks. From January 1863 to May 1863, the regiment also guarded the railway depots along the rail line between Algiers (south of the Mississippi River, now part of New Orleans) to Brashear City (now called Morgan City). By this time, the Guard's numbers had diminished to 500. Troops of the Native Guards were assigned guard duty at Fort Macomb, Fort Pike, Fort Massachusetts (Mississippi), Fort St. Philip, and Fort Jackson.

In mid-1863, the 1st Louisiana Native Guard, along with the 3rd Louisiana Native Guard, had its first chance at combat. These units participated in the first assault on the fortifications in the Siege of Port Hudson on May 27, as well as the second assault on June 14. Captain Cailloux died heroically in the first assault.

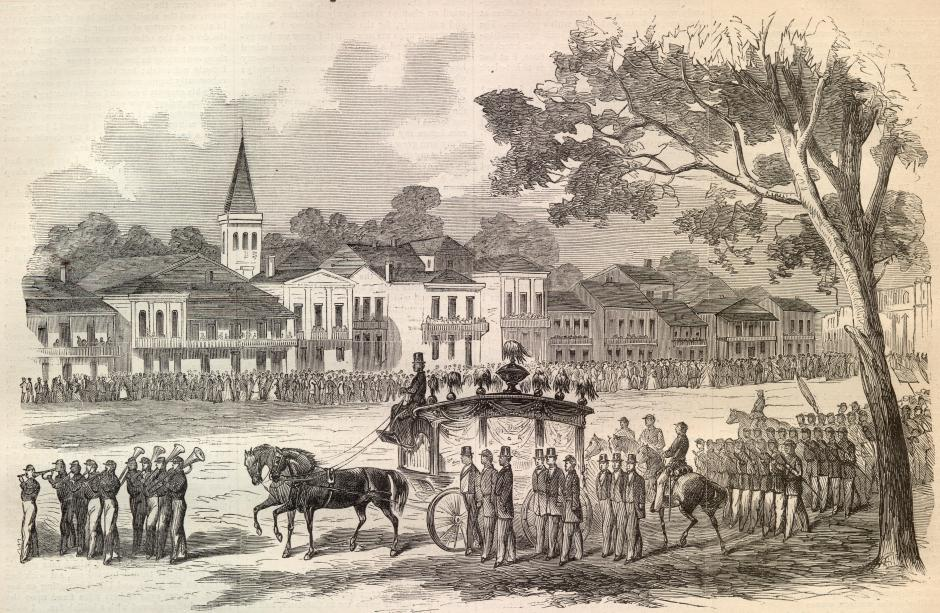
Cailloux's funeral

Quiet reigned over the battlefield throughout much of May 28. Banks had requested the truce to carry off the wounded and bury the dead. Yet, inexplicably, the Federals left untouched the area where the Native Guards had charged the previous day--in stark contrast to their actions elsewhere on the battlefield. The hot sun putrefied the bodies until the stench forced Confederate Colonel Shelby to ask Bank's permission to bury the dead in front of his lines. Banks refused, claiming that he had no dead in that area.

Cailloux's body, as well as those of the other members of the 1st Louisiana Native Guard who fell with him that day, was left on the field of battle until the surrender of Port Hudson on July 9, 1863. News of his heroism reached New Orleans, and Cailloux received a hero's funeral in the city with a large procession and thousands of attendees along the route on July 29, 1863.

== Corps D'Afrique (1863-1864) ==
In June 1863, the 1st, 2nd, and 3rd Louisiana Native Guard Regiments were redesignated as the 1st, 2nd, and 3rd Corps d'Afrique. Perhaps 200 to 300 of the original 1,000 members of the 1st Louisiana Native Guard made this transition. Poor treatment by white soldiers and difficult field conditions resulted in many black officers resigning and enlisted soldiers deserting the Corps.

In April 1864 the Corps d'Afrique was dissolved, and its members joined the newly organized 73rd and 74th Regiments of the United States Colored Troops of the Union army. By the end of the war, about 175,000 African Americans had served in the 170 regiments of the United States Colored Troops. In contrast to the 1st Louisiana Native Guards organization, all field and line officers of the United States Colored Troops were white. At the war's end, approximately 100 of the original 1,000 members of the First Louisiana Native Guard still remained in uniform in either the 73rd or 74th Regiments.

== Legacy ==
P.B.S. Pinchback, who came from the North to serve the Union, and others like him were free men of color who joined the Union militia for the first time and distinctly for that cause. Most of the Guard soldiers were African Americans who had escaped from slavery and joined the Union effort. Some historians think the legend of continuity of the regiments was a propaganda ploy by Union General Benjamin F. Butler.

== See also ==
- List of Louisiana Union Civil War units
- List of United States Colored Troops Civil War units
