= 1st Louisiana Colored Light Artillery Battery =

- Active: November 6, 1863–December 28, 1865
- Disbanded: December 28, 1865
- Country: United States
- Allegiance: Union
- Branch: Artillery
- Size: Battery
- Engagements: American Civil War

The 1st Louisiana Colored Light Artillery Battery was organized at Hebron's Plantation, Missouri, November 6, 1863. Attached to 1st Brigade, U.S. Colored Troops, District of Vicksburg, to April, 1864. On duty at Goodrich Landing and Vicksburg till April, 1864. Designation of Battery changed to Battery "C", 2nd U.S. Colored Light Artillery, April 26, 1864.

Organized from 1st Louisiana Battery, African Descent. Designated Battery "A" March 11, 1864, and Battery "C", April 26, 1864. Attached to Post Goodrich Landing, District of Vicksburg, Mississippi, to May, 1864. Post of Louisiana, District of Vicksburg, Mississippi, to December 1864. Reserve Artillery, Post of Vicksburg, Mississippi, District of Vicksburg, Mississippi, to December, 1865. Post and garrison duty at Goodrich Landing, Vicksburg, and Milliken's Bend and in the Department of Mississippi till December, 1865. Mustered out December 28, 1865.

== See also ==
- List of Louisiana Union Civil War units

== Bibliography ==
- Dyer, Frederick H. (1959). A Compendium of the War of the Rebellion. Sagamore Press, Inc. Thomas Yoseloff, Publisher. New York. LCCN 59-12963
