= Siege of Port Hudson order of battle =

The order of battle for the Siege of Port Hudson includes:

- Siege of Port Hudson order of battle: Confederate
- Siege of Port Hudson order of battle: Union
