= 3rd Louisiana Native Guard Infantry Regiment =

Regiment in the Union Army

3rd Louisiana Regiment Native Guard Infantry
- Active: 1862–1865
- Allegiance: United States
- Type: Infantry
- Part of: Union Army
- Engagements: Siege of Port Hudson; Red River Campaign; Battle of Mansura; Battle of Yellow Bayou

Commanders
- Notable commanders: Col John A. Nelson

The 3rd Louisiana Regiment Native Guard Infantry was a regiment in the Union Army during the American Civil War.

== Port Hudson ==
The unit was organized at New Orleans, Louisiana, November 24, 1862, and remained there until May 1863. Between May and July, the regiment was involved in the Siege of Port Hudson.

== Corps d'Afrique ==
The designation was changed to 3rd Regiment, Corps d'Afrique June 6 at Port Hudson. The Confederate garrison at Port Hudson surrendered on July 9, five days after the fall of Vicksburg farther up the Mississippi River.

== United States Colored Troops ==
The unit designation was changed once again to the 75th United States Colored Troops on April 4, 1864. The 75th participated in the Red River Campaign with engagements at the Battle of Mansura on May 16 and the Battle of Yellow Bayou on May 18.

The regiment remained on duty in southern Louisiana for the remainder of the war and mustered out November 25, 1865.

== See also ==
- Port Hudson order of battle
- List of Louisiana Union Civil War units
- List of United States Colored Troops Civil War units
