= 2nd Louisiana Native Guard Infantry Regiment =

2nd Louisiana Regiment Native Guard Infantry
- Active: 1862–1865
- Country: United States of America
- Allegiance: USA
- Branch: Union Army
- Type: Infantry
- Engagements: American Civil War

Commanders
- Notable commanders: Nathan W. Daniels

The 2nd Louisiana Regiment Native Guard Infantry was a regiment in the Union Army during the American Civil War. It was organized in New Orleans and was tasked with defending the city until being redeployed to Ship Island in Mississippi. Its higher-ranking officers were white and lower grade officers and enlisted men were mixed heritage and African American.

== Native Guard ==
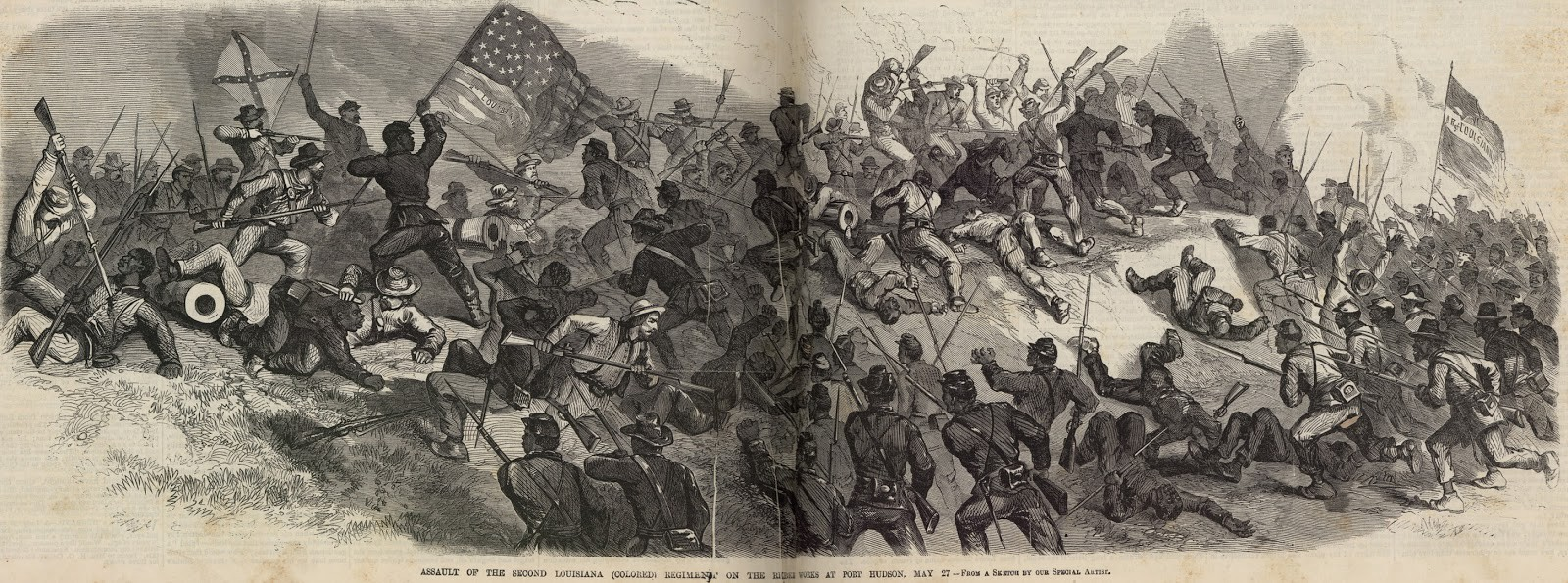
Assault of the Second Louisiana (colored regiment) on the Rebel Works at Port Hudson, May 27, 1863

The Regiment was organized in New Orleans, Louisiana, in October 1862, and assigned to the defenses of New Orleans to December 1862. It operated in Louisiana until January 1863, when it was sent to Ship Island, Mississippi. As with its related regiment, the 1st Louisiana Native Guard, the field grade officers (colonels, lieutenant colonels and majors) were white, and the original line officers were black. An exception was Major Francis E. Dumas, a wealthy creole from Louisiana who had enlisted a company of his own slaves. He resigned in July 1863.

Among the company officers was P.B.S. Pinchback, an educated free man of color who became active in the Republican Party after the war, serving as lieutenant governor and then governor of Louisiana in 1872. He was elected to the US House of Representatives in 1874 and the US Senate in 1876. He resigned his commission in 1863 because of discrimination.

The remaining black officers of the regiment were all purged by Major General Nathaniel P. Banks in early 1863.

== Corps d'Afrique ==
The designation of the Regiment was changed to 2nd Regiment, Corps d' Afrique on June 6, 1863. It was on garrison duty at Ship Island from June 1863 to April 1864.

== 74th United States Colored Troops ==
The Regiment designation was changed to 74th United States Colored Troops on April 4, 1864 and it was attached to defenses of New Orleans until October 1864. The regiment participated in an expedition from Fort Pike to Pearl River from September 9–12, 1864. Detachments served on an expedition from Fort Pike to Bayou Bonforica January 31 – February 1, 1865, and from Fort Pike to Bayou St. Louis March 28–30, 1865.

The Regiment remained on garrison at Ship Island and mustered out on October 11, 1865.

== See also ==
- List of Louisiana Union Civil War units
- List of United States Colored Troops Civil War units

== Bibliography ==
- Weaver, C. P.; Daniels, Nathan W. (1998). Thank God my regiment an African one: the Civil War diary of Colonel Nathan W. Daniels. Baton Rouge: Louisiana State University Press. ISBN 0-8071-2242-4.
- Bearss, Edwin C. (1984). Historic Resource Study Ship Island Harrison County, Mississippi Gulf Islands National Seashore Florida/ Mississippi. Denver Service Center: United States Department of The Interior, National Park Service.
