= Battle of Goodrich's Landing =

Battle of the American Civil War

Coordinates: 32.6863°N 91.2021°W

- Part of the American Civil War
- Plantations of Carroll Parish mapped after the war, showing location of Goodrich's Landing
Date	June 29–30, 1863
Location	Near Goodrich's Landing, Louisiana
Result	See aftermath

Belligerents
United States (Union)	(Confederate States of America) CSA (Confederacy)

Commanders and leaders
Alfred W. Ellet; William F. Wood	William H. Parsons

Units involved
Mississippi Marine Brigade; 1st Arkansas Infantry (African Descent); 10th Louisiana Infantry (African Descent); 1st Kansas Mounted Regiment	12th Texas Cavalry Regiment; 19th Texas Cavalry Regiment; 15th Louisiana Cavalry Battalion; Cameron's Louisiana Battery; Ralston's Mississippi Battery

The Battle of Goodrich's Landing was fought on June 29 and June 30, 1863, between Union and Confederate forces during the American Civil War as part of the Vicksburg campaign. Confederate forces operating in northeastern Louisiana were attempting to aid the defenders of besieged Vicksburg, Mississippi, by raiding plantations and disrupting military encampments along the west bank of the Mississippi River. Major General John G. Walker's Confederate forces were reinforced by a brigade sent down from Arkansas under the command of Colonel William Henry Parsons.

On June 29, Parsons led a force against the Union position at Goodrich's Landing, Louisiana. Parsons encountered two companies of the 1st Arkansas Infantry (African Descent) defending a fortified position on an Indian mound. The Confederates deemed the position too strong to take easily by assault, and after consultation with Brigadier General James C. Tappan (whose brigade of Arkansas troops was also involved in the operations in northeast Louisiana), the Confederates accepted the surrender of the Union troops on the mound. Eyewitness accounts indicate that some of the Black enlisted men were killed after the surrender.

Parsons advanced towards Lake Providence, Louisiana, with the 12th Texas Cavalry Regiment and the 19th Texas Cavalry Regiment and skirmished with the 1st Kansas Mounted Regiment before returning to the Confederate camp. Union Brigadier General Alfred W. Ellet arrived with his Mississippi Marine Brigade, and along with the troops of the Goodrich's Landing garrison (the rest of the 1st Arkansas and the 10th Louisiana Infantry (African Descent)) pursued the retreating Confederates. The two sides skirmished at the crossing of Tensas Bayou before the Confederates broke contact and left. The Confederate operations caused significant damage but did not assist the defenders of Vicksburg in a meaningful way; disruption to Union operations was only temporary.

== Background ==
During the initial stages of the 1863 portion of the Vicksburg campaign, the Union troops of Major General Ulysses S. Grant had a supply base at Milliken's Bend, Louisiana. By the Siege of Vicksburg, Grant's besieging forces had established a different supply route, and Milliken's Bend decreased in importance. Milliken's Bend and other locations remained as lesser supply points. Black soldiers were recruited and trained in those regions as well, and their units became known as the United States Colored Troops. Training sites for Black soldiers were established at Goodrich's Landing, Louisiana; Milliken's Bend; and Lake Providence, Louisiana. These units were poorly armed and trained, and were not intended for front-line combat use. The regiments had White officers, many of whom were recently elevated multiple ranks at once when they transferred into the new regiments. Many former slaves who did not join the military worked on government-leased cotton plantations. The United States government confiscated abandoned plantations along the Mississippi River and leased them to private businessmen, who used the former slaves as agricultural laborers. This setup was lightly regulated and the laborers were often treated poorly.

The Confederates, in support of the defenders of Vicksburg, used Major General John G. Walker's Texas division (Note: This division was popularly known as "Walker's Greyhounds" or the "Greyhound Division" due to its reputation for making hard marches.) for offensive operations against Grant's positions along the Mississippi in Louisiana. A portion of Walker's command was repulsed in the Battle of Milliken's Bend on June 7, an assault against the Union position at Young's Point was called off, and the June 9 Battle of Lake Providence was unsuccessful. Walker's troops retreated after the Battle of Richmond on June 15, then reinforced by Brigadier General James C. Tappan's brigade of Arkansas troops and returned to operations against the leased plantations. Walker and Tappan's men burned cotton gins and plantation buildings, returned hundreds of former slaves to slavery, and damaged around two dozen of the leased plantations. The Confederate commander in Arkansas, Lieutenant General Theophilus Hunter Holmes, was ordered in June by Lieutenant General E. Kirby Smith (the commander of the Confederate Trans-Mississippi Department) to send a force of at least brigade strength to support the operations in Louisiana. Holmes selected Colonel William H. Parsons for the task and ordered the formation of a provisional brigade of cavalry for the campaign. This force consisted of a portion of Pratt's Texas Battery, the 12th Texas Cavalry Regiment, and the 19th Texas Cavalry Regiment. These units were near Helena, Arkansas, and it was late in the month before the units gathered at Gaines Landing, Arkansas.

== Battle ==
=== Fight at the mound ===
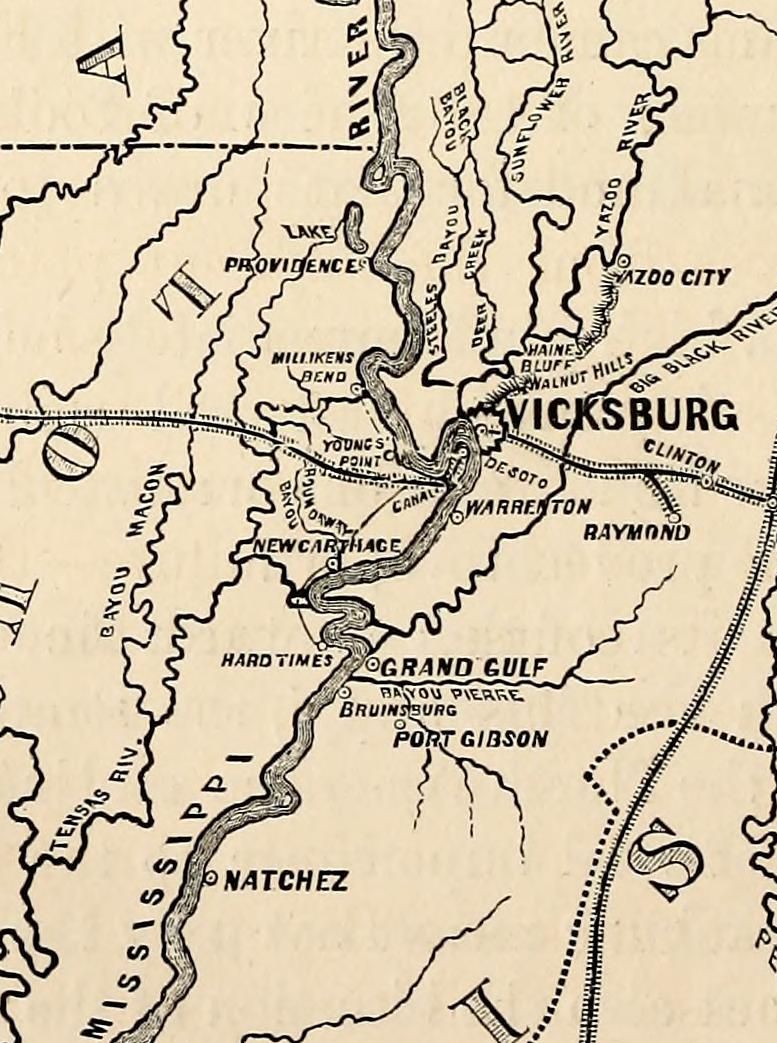
While Confederate troops were besieged in Vicksburg, a relief effort struck at Union posts along the Mississippi River at Young's Point, Milliken's Bend, Lake Providence, and Goodrich's Landing (which was near Lake Providence).

Moving south into Louisiana, Parsons's men joined the forces of Walker and Tappan. Lieutenant Colonel Isaac F. Harrison's 15th Louisiana Cavalry Battalion and two artillery batteries (Cameron's Louisiana Battery and Ralston's Mississippi Battery) were attached to Parsons's two regiments. The troops assigned to the defenses of Goodrich's Landing were the 1st Arkansas Infantry (African Descent) and the 10th Louisiana Infantry (African Descent); the portions stationed at the landing itself occupied a fortified position. To the northwest, on an Indian mound about five miles (eight kilometres) away were two detached companies of the 1st Arkansas. (Note: The mound is variously reported to have been about 50 feet (15 m) or 80 to 100 feet (24 to 30 m) high.) This area was known as Mound Plantation. The historian John D. Winters stated, "the sides of the mound had been strongly fortified and were next to impossible to scale without great loss of life". Some of the defenders were positioned in a ditch at the bottom of the mound, and a 30-foot (9 m) or 40-foot (12 m) square fort was located on the top. The defenders of this position were sufficiently armed, equipped with Enfield rifles. Parsons's approach was split into two groups: Harrison and one artillery battery took one route, while Parsons, with his two Texas regiments and the other artillery battery, approached the position on the mound. Following behind were Tappan's brigade and a brigade of Texas infantry commanded by Colonel Horace Randal. (Note: Discussing a later stage of the battle, Gudmestad refers to a "1,400-man raiding force"; it is not entirely clear if this figure is referring to the entire Confederate force in action, or only those troops involved in the encounter with two Union ships.)

On June 29, Parsons's men approached the mound with the 19th Texas on the left, the battery in the center and the 12th Texas on the right. Parsons's artillery (Note: Primary sources disagree as to if this was the Louisiana or Mississippi battery.) opened fire on the mound at a range of 800 yards (730 m). Rifle fire between the Union defenders and a company of the 19th Texas, which had taken position on a smaller mound in the area, led to several Confederate casualties. Parsons determined that the position could not easily be carried by assault, but Tappan's troops soon arrived in support. A flag of truce was offered to the defenders, and the White officers on the mound expressed a desire for surrender if the officers would receive proper treatment as prisoners of war; the Black enlisted men were instead subject to unconditional surrender. Walker had instructed his subordinates that armed Black troops should not be permitted to surrender, but Tappan and Parsons agreed to accept the surrender due to the difficulty that would be encountered in assaulting the mound.

This surrender occurred against the backdrop of rumors of the slaughter of Black troops at Milliken's Bend. (Note: Grant had heard of the allegations and had written a letter on June 22 to Confederate Major General Richard Taylor expressing concern about the matter; Taylor denied that the Confederates had killed any prisoners and stated that for "negroes captured in arms, the officers of the Confederate States Army are required, by an order emanating from the General Government, to turn over all such to the civil authorities, to be dealt with according to the laws of the State wherein they were captured". There were existing laws that provided the death penalty for servile insurrection. Casualty reports indicate an unusually high killed-to-wounded ratio for one of the Black regiments at Milliken's Bend. Confederate troops killed some of the wounded on the field. Some of the Black prisoners taken were likely executed, but the majority were returned to slavery. A prisoner held at Monroe later claimed that two Union officers captured at Milliken's Bend were executed after the battle. Barnickel believes this report to be accurate.) Additionally, Confederate government proclamations and legislation allowed for the execution of White officers of Black regiments after capture if found guilty under Confederate laws regarding servile insurrection, as many in the Confederacy feared that arming former slaves would result in a servile insurrection and the massive slaughter of Southerners. Winters describes the surrender as, "Suspecting that their Negroes under arms would be treated with barbaric cruelty, the officers nonetheless offered to surrender them unconditionally". The historian George S. Burkhardt believes the "Federal officers knew their fate if overwhelmed and decided glory's price was too high", which led to their decision to "save themselves by sacrificing their men". The historian Linda Barnickel writes, "Though it may be difficult to see the Union commander's decision to surrender his African American soldiers as anything but cowardly, it ironically may have saved many of their lives", as it would be much more difficult for the Confederates to justify a mass killing of the sudden influx of prisoners as compared to the likelihood of mass slaughter during the heat of battle. Barnickel places the value of the captured Black soldiers at over $100,000 in the Confederate slave economy, providing an economic rationale for the Confederates to not kill the surrendered prisoners; Barnickel suggests that it is possible that the decision to surrender their men was "a calculated risk" by the officers.

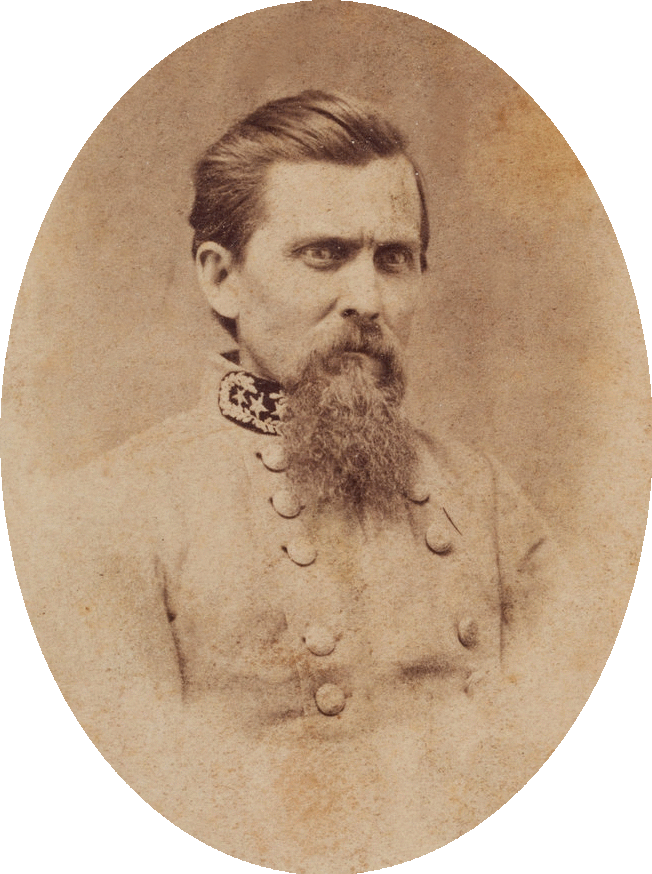
Major General John G. Walker, whose Texas division participated in the operations in northeastern Louisiana

Walker later wrote that "I consider it an unfortunate circumstance that any armed negroes were captured". A Confederate infantryman from Texas later wrote, "Some 12 to 15 of the Negroes died before we got here with them." The use of the word "died" by the soldier was likely a euphemism for the actual nature of the deaths. Barnickel notes that "some may have died of exhaustion or wounds". Firsthand accounts left by the prisoners mention beatings and killings. Those who survived were marched to Delhi, Louisiana, where there was a railhead; it is uncertain if the killings took the form of executions of the Blacks in revenge for serving in the Union military, or if they were killings of stragglers who were slowing the march. According to Confederate reports, 113 enlisted men were captured, while Barnickel notes that Union returns indicate that it was as many as 128; Barnickel notes that the difference between the two figures is roughly the number of prisoners who reportedly died in the immediate aftermath of the surrender. Before Barnickel's writing (2013), most scholars of the battle concluded that three Union officers surrendered, but Barnickel's research indicated that the number was likely four. Burkhardt notes the existence of unverifiable claims from Confederate civilians that two of the captured officers were executed; Barnickel rejects claims that any of the officers taken prisoner in the affair were executed: her research found that one of the captured officers is known to have spent the rest of the war in a prisoner of war camp, while the other three she believes were captured were later returned to their regiments.

=== Move towards Lake Providence and June 30th fighting ===
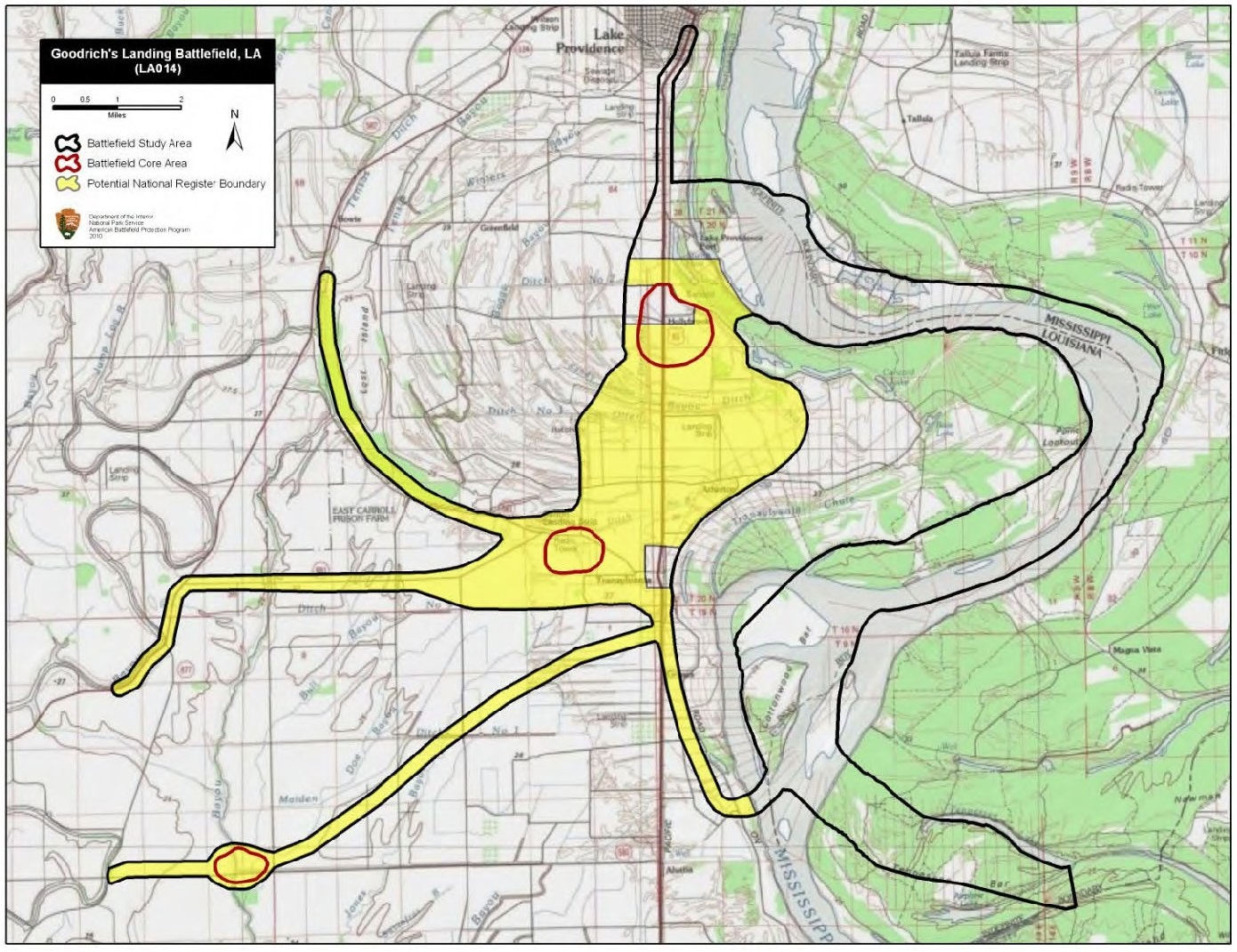
Map of Goodrich's Landing Battlefield core and study areas by the American Battlefield Protection Program.

Walker's men spent the night near the mound, while Parsons's men moved on after destroying the structures at the mound. Parsons's cavalry burned buildings, cotton, and cotton gins on the way to Lake Providence. Under orders to destroy anything which could potentially be used by Union forces, Parsons's troops destroyed most structures they came across. While two plantation houses still being occupied by women were spared, no mercy was shown to government-leased properties. When the Union Mississippi Marine Brigade (Note: The Mississippi Marine Brigade was a Union Army formation that used steamboats to increase its mobility.) moved through the area the next day, soldiers from the unit reported finding evidence of looting and charred bodies among the destroyed buildings. Former slaves taken from the plantations were moved to the interior of the state and then used as a labor force by the Confederate authorities or returned to slavery. The 19th Texas Cavalry was mounted on worn-out horses and the 12th Texas Cavalry was in the lead when it encountered the 1st Kansas Mounted Regiment, which was part of the garrison of Lake Providence. The Kansans had prepared an ambush. Parsons ordered a charge against the Union line, which was successful, and the 19th Texas Cavalry arrived later in the fight. The Kansans fell back to Lake Providence. The Union troops outdistanced the Confederates and Parsons withdrew his men to rejoin Walker, destroying as they went. The gunboat USS Romeo and the armed transport John Raine fired on the Confederate troops. (Note: The historian Ed Bearss places the fighting with the 1st Kansas Mounted Regiment as occurring on the morning on June 30.) Cavalry were landed from John Raine and harassed the Confederates, and Romeo fired her guns nearly a hundred times.

Walker received orders from Major General Richard Taylor to take his infantry to Berwick Bay and the Confederate infantry withdrew from the area, reaching Bayou Macon by the end of June 30. Parsons's troops remained. Brigadier General Alfred W. Ellet brought his Mississippi Marine Brigade to Goodrich's Landing on the morning of June 30. Along with the two Black regiments at Goodrich's Landing, commanded by Colonel William F. Wood, Ellet sent his troops inland in pursuit of Parsons. After moving 5 miles (8.0 km) inland, Ellet determined he had taken an incorrect route and the march was rerouted to Tensas Bayou. Ellet sent his cavalry ahead to scout, while the rest of his men stopped to rest and pick berries partway to the bayou. At the Tensas, the cavalry encountered the Confederate force. Ellet could only bring up a portion of his infantry in time to engage in the skirmish. Parsons attempted to turn the Union right flank but was repulsed, and Ellet brought up artillery. Parsons broke off the engagement, burned the bridge over the bayou, and withdrew, covering the retreat of the Confederate infantry. This skirmish resulted in three Union casualties and a similar number of Confederate losses.

== Aftermath ==
The historian Anne J. Bailey describes Parsons's casualties in the operation as "several [...] killed and a number wounded", while Burkhardt states that the Confederates lost four men killed and eighteen wounded. The historian Ed Bearss states that the fight involving the 1st Kansas Mounted Infantry resulted in one Union soldier killed and three wounded, while six Confederate fatalities were left on the battlefield; that the skirmish at the Tensas Bayou resulted in three casualties on each side; and that Union soldiers found the corpses of three Confederate soldiers killed by fire from Romeo and John Raine. The historian Chester G. Hearn states that Ellet had only one battle casualty in the fight at the Tensas, but that over 100 of his men became ill with heat exhaustion.

The overall operations resulted in the capture of at least 1,300 Blacks, (Note: Barnickel places the number of former slaves taken from the leased plantations at roughly 2,000.) over 200 weapons, more than 400 horses and mules, and various equipment. While Bailey describes the raid as "one of the most successful of its kind on the west bank of the Mississippi", it did little to aid the defenders of Vicksburg, who surrendered on July 4. The raids had a temporary impact on Union operations. Walker's men reached Delhi on July 1, where they were ordered to remain. The Confederate commander of the Trans-Mississippi Department, General E. Kirby Smith, initially intended to keep the infantry in northeastern Louisiana, but after news of the fall of Vicksburg arrived, Walker's infantry was ordered to march to the Red River. Parsons's troops remained in Louisiana until they returned to Arkansas in November. A Union force occupied Goodrich's Landing on August 21 and advanced to Monroe, but did not remain in the area.

The Missouri Democrat newspaper published a story purporting to detail the discovery of charred skeletons of captured Union officers after the Battle of Milliken's Bend (including evidence of torture and crucifixion). Barnickel believes this is an exaggerated version of the finding of human remains in burned-out buildings by Ellet's men during the Goodrich's Landing operations. There is no consensus among scholars of the Vicksburg campaign as to what degree of truth underpins the newspaper report, including whether it is a fabrication.

== Sources ==
- Bailey, Anne J. (1989). Between the Enemy and Texas: Parsons's Texas Cavalry in the Civil War. Fort Worth, Texas: Texas Christian University Press. ISBN 0-87565-034-1.
- Ballard, Michael B. (2004). Vicksburg: The Campaign that Opened the Mississippi. Chapel Hill, North Carolina: University of North Carolina Press. ISBN 0-8078-2893-9.
- Barnickel, Linda (2013). Milliken's Bend: A Civil War Battle in History and Memory. Baton Rouge: Louisiana State University Press. ISBN 978-0-8071-4992-8.
- Bearss, Edwin C. (1991) [1986]. The Campaign for Vicksburg. Vol. III: Unvexed to the Sea. Dayton, Ohio: Morningside Bookshop. ISBN 0-89029-516-6.
- Burkhardt, George S. (2007). Confederate Rage, Yankee Wrath: No Quarter in the Civil War. Carbondale, Illinois: Southern Illinois University Press. ISBN 978-0-8093-2743-0.
- Floyd, Dale E.; Lowe, David W. (1998) [1993]. Civil War Sites Advisory Commission Report on the Nation's Civil War Battlefields:Technical Volume II: Battle Summaries (PDF). Washington, D.C.: Civil War Sites Advisory Commission.
- Gudmestad, Robert (2025). The Devil's Own Purgatory: The United States Mississippi River Squadron in the Civil War. Baton Rouge, Louisiana: Louisiana State University Press. ISBN 978-0-8071-8491-2.
- Hearn, Chester G. (2000). Ellet's Brigade: The Strangest Outfit of All. Baton Rouge, Louisiana: Louisiana State University Press. ISBN 0-8071-2559-8.
- Kennedy, Frances H., ed. (1998). The Civil War Battlefield Guide (2nd ed.). Boston/New York: Houghton Mifflin. ISBN 978-0-395-74012-5.
- Lowe, Richard (2004). Walker's Texas Division C.S.A.: Greyhounds of the Trans-Mississippi. Baton Rouge, Louisiana: Louisiana State University Press. ISBN 0-8071-3153-9.
- Miller, Donald L. (2019). Vicksburg: Grant's Campaign that Broke the Confederacy. New York, New York: Simon and Schuster. ISBN 978-1-4516-4139-4.
- Smith, Timothy B. (2021). The Siege of Vicksburg: Climax of the Campaign to Open the Mississippi River, May 23 – July 4, 1863. Lawrence, Kansas: University Press of Kansas. ISBN 978-0-7006-3226-8.
- Winschel, Terrence J. (2004) [1999]. Triumph and Defeat: The Vicksburg Campaign. Vol. 1. New York City: Savas Beatie. ISBN 1-932714-04-9.
- Winters, John D. (1991) [1963]. The Civil War in Louisiana. Baton Rouge, Louisiana: Louisiana State University Press. ISBN 0-8071-1725-0.
