= Joseph Owens =

Joseph Owens is the name of:

- Joseph Owens (Jesuit), Caribbean social worker and author
- Joseph Owens (Redemptorist) (1908–2005), Canadian scholar in medieval philosophy
- Joe Owens (1946–2013), American football defensive end
- Joseph Owens (politician) (1912–1994), Mayor of Galway from 1953 to 1954
- Joseph Owens (footballer) (1878–?), Rhosllanerchrugog F.C. and Wales international footballer
