= Marching Song of the First Arkansas =

1864 American Civil War song

"Marching Song of the First Arkansas Colored Regiment" is one of the few Civil War-era songs inspired by the lyrical structure of "The Battle Hymn of the Republic" and the tune of "John Brown's Body" that is still performed and recorded today. The "Marching Song" has been described as "a powerful early statement of black pride, militancy, and desire for full equality, revealing the aspirations of black soldiers for Reconstruction as well as anticipating the spirit of the civil rights movement of the 1960s." The song's lyrics are attributed to the regiment's white officer, Captain Lindley Miller. An almost identical song, "The Valiant Soldiers", is attributed to Sojourner Truth in post-Civil War editions of her Narrative. Recent scholarship supports Miller as the original author, or at least compiler, of the song.

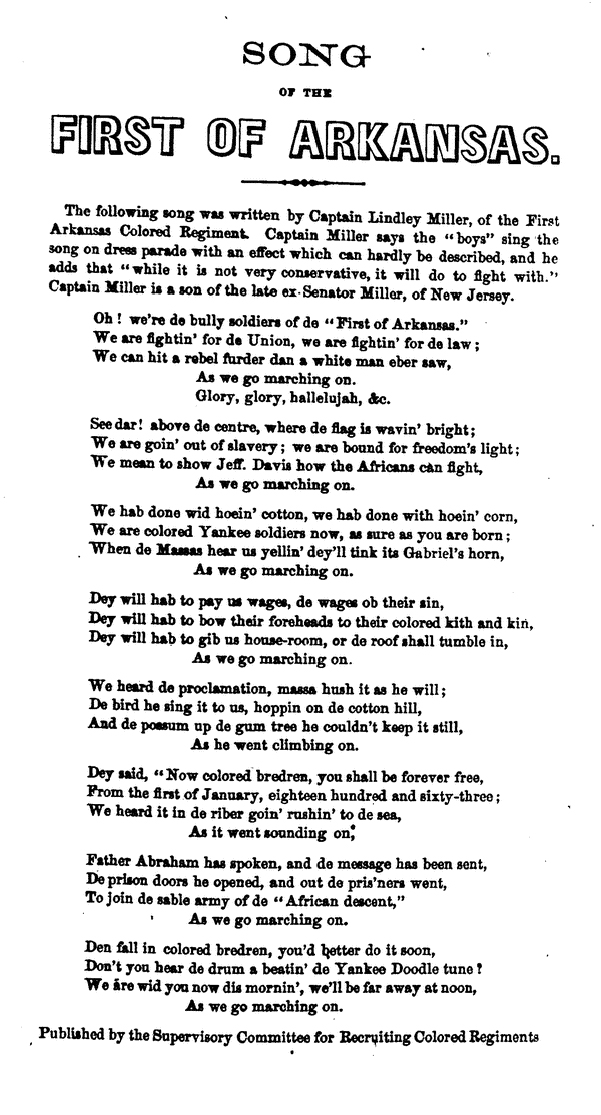
Song of the First of Arkansas, 1864

== History ==
Although Congress had passed the Confiscation Act and Militia Act in July 1862, permitting freed slaves to serve in the Union Army, President Abraham Lincoln was initially reluctant to enlist blacks as soldiers. Lincoln announced in September 1862 that effective January 1, 1863, all slaves in Confederate territory would be free. Beginning in 1863, recruitment of black soldiers proceeded with Lincoln's approval.

The First Arkansas Volunteer Infantry Regiment (African Descent) began recruiting among former slaves in Helena, Arkansas following Lincoln's Emancipation Proclamation of January 1863, and was officially established on May 1. In June the regiment saw action at Mound Plantation, Mississippi, and at Goodrich's Landing, Louisiana, where the unit remained through January 1864. The unit then moved to Haines Bluff near Vicksburg, Mississippi until May 1864. The Union Army standardized the varied names of colored regiments as "United States Colored Troops" (U.S.C.T.), and the First Arkansas became the "46th Regiment, United States Colored Infantry" on May 11, 1864.

Lindley Miller was the son of Jacob W. Miller, who served as a U.S. Senator of the Whig Party from New Jersey between 1841 and 1853. His mother was the former Mary Louisa Macculloch, daughter of wealthy Morristown, New Jersey engineer and businessman George P. Macculloch, who designed and built the Morris Canal.

Lindley Miller was admitted to the bar in 1855, and established a successful law practice in New York City. Even as a young man, he was a noted orator and poet. After President Lincoln's proclamation of war in April 1861, he enlisted as a private in the 7th Regiment, New York State Militia, known as the "Silk Stocking Regiment" for its elite membership. He married Anne Huntington Tracy of Manhattan in May 1862. In August 1863, Anne Miller died after childbirth, at age 24, and their infant child died a week later. Heartbroken, Lindley Miller sought to become an officer with a colored regiment. He received a commission as captain in the First Arkansas Volunteer Infantry Regiment (African Descent) in November 1863.

Captain Miller first mentions the "Marching Song" in a letter from Vicksburg to his mother in Morristown, dated January 20, 1864. "I wrote a song for them to the tune of 'John Brown' the other day, which the whole Regiment sings. I sent a copy of it to Anthony" (Lindley's brother-in-law, Anthony Quinton Keasbey, U.S. Attorney for New Jersey from 1861 to 1868, married to Lindley's older sister, Edwina). Keasbey sent the song to the National Anti-Slavery Standard, where it appeared in the February 27, 1864 issue. Recognized for his excellent service, Miller was promoted to Major and assigned to a Missouri regiment, but never took up his new commission. On sick leave at his home, Miller died on June 30, 1864, at age 30, from a fever he had acquired during his service with the First Arkansas.

The "Marching Song of the First Arkansas Colored Regiment" is known today through the song sheet issued by the Supervisory Committee for Recruiting Colored Regiments in Philadelphia. The "Song of the First of Arkansas", written in dialect, was one of several broadsides issued by the Committee for recruitment purposes. The broadside had this brief introduction: "The following song was written by Captain Lindley Miller, of the First Arkansas Colored Regiment. Captain Miller says the 'boys' sing the song on dress parade with an effect which can hardly be described, and he adds that 'while it is not very conservative, it will do to fight with.' Captain Miller is a son of the late ex-Senator Miller, of New Jersey." The song was also included in a collection of Union Army songs published in New York in 1864.

Irwin Silber, editor of Sing Out! from 1951 to 1967, introduced the song to a mid-20th-century audience in his Songs of the Civil War, published in 1960 in conjunction with the Civil War Centennial observance from 1961 to 1965. Silber thought it likely that the song represented a collaboration between Miller and his troops. Silber edited the song to standard English and titled it "Marching Song of the First Arkansas (Negro) Regiment."

== Score ==
"Marching Song" follows the tune of "John Brown's Body" and "The Battle Hymn of the Republic":

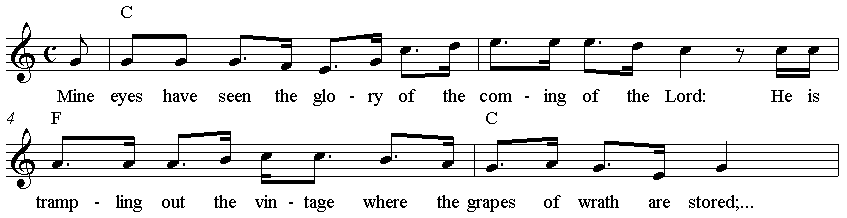
"The Battle Hymn of the Republic" melody beginning

== Lyrics ==
1. Oh, we're de bully soldiers of de "First of Arkansas",
We are fightin' for de Union, we are fightin' for de law,
We can hit a Rebel furder dan a white man eber saw,
As we go marching on.

Chorus:
Glory, glory hallelujah.
Glory, glory hallelujah.
Glory, glory hallelujah.
As we go marching on.

2. See dar above the centre, where de flag is wavin' bright,
We are goin' out of slavery; we are bound for freedom's light;
We mean to show Jeff Davis how the Africans can fight,
As we go marching on! (Chorus)

3. We hab done with hoein' cotton, we hab done with hoein' corn,
We are colored Yankee soldiers, now, as sure as you are born;
When de massas hear us yellin', dey'll tink it's Gabriel's Horn,
As we go marching on. (Chorus)

4. Dey will hab to pay us wages, de wages ob their sin,
Dey will hab to bow their foreheads to their colored kith and kin,
Dey will hab to gib us house-room, or de roof shall tumble in!
As we go marching on. (Chorus)

5. We heard de Proclamation, massa hush it as he will,
De bird he sing it to us, hoppin on de cotton hill,
And de possum up de gum tree, he couldn't keep it still,
As he went climbing on. (Chorus)

6. Dey said, "Now colored bredren, you shall be forever free,
From the first of January, Eighteen hundred sixty-three."
We heard it in de riber goin' rushin' to the sea,
As it went sounding on. (Chorus)

7. Father Abraham has spoken and de message has been sent,
De prison doors he opened, and out de pris'ners went,
To join de sable army of de "African descent",
As we go marching on. (Chorus)

8. Den fall in, colored bredren, you'd better do it soon,
Don't you hear the drum a-beating de Yankee Doodle tune?
We are wid you now dis morning, we'll be far away at noon,
As we go marching on. (Chorus)

== Interpretation ==
The black soldiers, in exuberant spirits, brag in the first three stanzas that they will show the rebels they are formidable fighters. They fight for the law, which offers equal treatment, as well as the Union. As soldiers, the third stanza says, they strike out for a new life, leaving behind "hoeing cotton" and "hoeing corn."

The most powerful challenge to the mores of the antebellum South is presented in the fourth stanza, where the black soldiers demand social equality, and more: "They will have to bow their foreheads to their colored kith and kin." White Southerners will have to acknowledge their actual blood relations among the former slaves. A heavy debt is owed: "They will have to pay us wages, the wages of their sin" (as Romans 6:23 notes, the "wages of sin is death"). The black soldiers demand reparations, or threaten retaliation: "They will have to give us house-room, or the roof shall tumble in!"

In stanzas five and six, slavery was abolished in Confederacy by the Emancipation Proclamation. Lincoln is described as "Father Abraham", a title that associates the President with the Old Testament patriarch, emphasizing the religious sanction to the abolition of slavery. The song is a powerful summary of the hopes and dreams of the black soldiers. Years later, a Civil War veteran told Norman B. Wood "he once heard a black regiment sing it just before a battle and they made the welkin [heavens] ring, and inspired all who heard it."

== Recordings ==
Soon after Silber's book appeared, two recordings were issued based on his version, one by Pete Seeger and Bill MacAdoo on the album Songs of the Civil War, released by Folkways Records in 1960. Tennessee Ernie Ford recorded the second on the album Tennessee Ernie Ford Sings Civil War Songs of the North, released by Capitol Records in 1961. The Seeger-MacAdoo folk song version includes three verses, and Ford's gospel quartet version includes four. Both recordings skipped the controversial fourth stanza. Seeger and MacAdoo's version is now a Smithsonian Folkways recording, and Ford's version is available as Bear Family Records BCD 16635 AS. Keith and Rusty McNeil also recorded a three-stanza version of the "Marching Song" in their three-CD set of Civil War Songs. The song is in their self-published Civil War Songbook. Sparky and Rhonda Rucker included four verses from the "Marching Song" in a medley titled "Glory Hallelujah Suite" on The Blue and the Grey in Black and White, released by Flying Fish Records in 1993. The bluegrass album Songs of the Civil War Era, self-published in November 2005 by ShoreGrass, contains a recording of the "Battle Hymn of the Republic" in which the first and second stanzas of the Marching Song are included.

Sweet Honey in the Rock recorded Truth's song in 1993 on their 20th anniversary album, Still on the Journey. Bernice Johnson Reagon, Sweet Honey's founder, renamed the song "Sojourner's Battle Hymn." Truth's biographers Erlene Stetson and Linda David describe the song as "rousing, brashly defiant, irreverent and joyous", and characterized Sweet Honey's version as "stirringly performed." In 2006 the Sojourner Truth Institute and Heritage Battle Creek produced a CD, Am I Not a Man and a Brother? Songs of Freedom North and South, with talented local singers and musicians from Battle Creek, Michigan, including a rendition of "The Valiant Soldiers" by Carolyn Ballard.

In the opera Appomattox by Philip Glass, the chorus sings a variation of the tune in Act One.

== Sojourner Truth's version ==
Sojourner Truth's version of the song, "The Valiant Soldiers", which appears in the 1878, 1881, and 1884 editions of her Narrative, is almost identical to Silber's edition of the "Marching Song", containing stanzas one through five plus stanza seven. Only the first line of the first stanza is different: "We are the valiant soldiers who've 'listed for the war." Stanzas six and eight are found only in the "Marching Song."

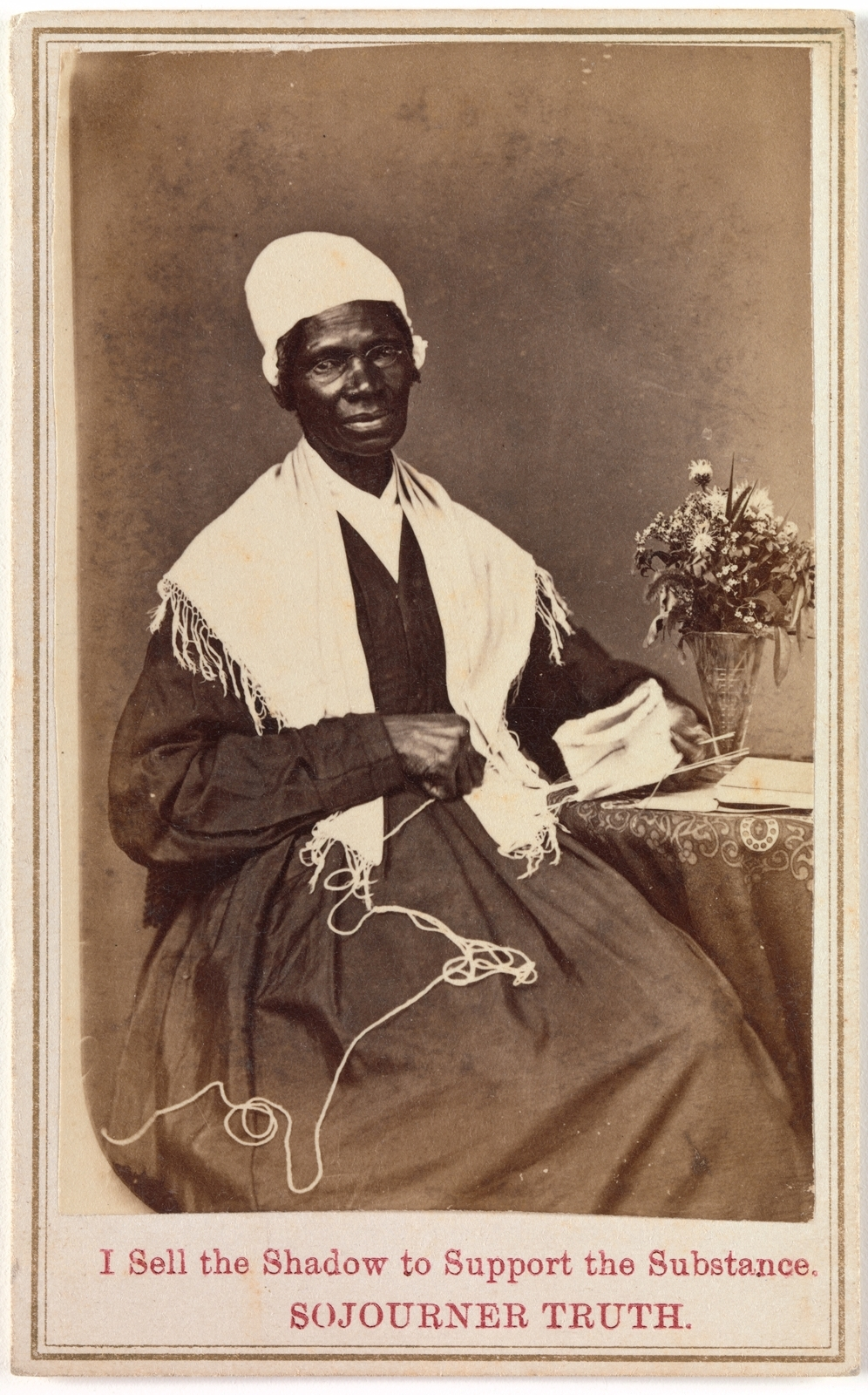
Truth's carte de visite

In the post-Civil War editions of Truth's Narrative, "The Valiant Soldiers" is introduced by this sentence by Francis Titus: "The following song, written for the first Michigan Regiment of colored soldiers, was composed by Sojourner Truth during the war, and was sung by her in Detroit and Washington."

As she was unable to read or write, Truth dictated her original autobiography to her friend Olive Gilbert. The Narrative of Sojourner Truth was published in Boston in 1850 by William Lloyd Garrison's printer on credit, and was sold by Truth at her public lectures. She had become a powerful and popular speaker on such reform topics as abolitionism, women's suffrage and temperance, often including songs in her presentations.

In 1860 Truth moved from Northampton, Massachusetts to Battle Creek, Michigan. Truth continued to travel and lecture during the Civil War, her fame as a speaker promoted by Harriet Beecher Stowe's article in the April 1863 Atlantic Monthly, romanticizing Truth as the "Libyan Sibyl." To support herself, Truth sold her carte de visite at lectures in addition to sheets of her favorite songs and copies of her Narrative.

Sometime around Thanksgiving 1863, Truth collected food in Battle Creek and delivered it to the First Michigan Colored Infantry, which was being organized that fall at Camp Ward in Detroit. Truth biographers Carleton Mabee and Nell Irvin Painter report she sang "The Valiant Soldiers" either on this occasion or during another visit to the soldiers in February 1864, although they have not cited any contemporary sources that verify this. Neither the story about Truth's visit in the Detroit Advertiser and Tribune of November 24, 1863 nor Truth's letters of that period make any mention of her singing "The Valiant Soldiers."

Truth is first linked to the song in 1878, fourteen years after Miller's version was published in the National Anti-Slavery Standard. Truth's Michigan friend Frances Titus edited an expanded edition of Truth's Narrative by adding a section of letters and articles Truth had collected in the scrapbooks she called her "Book of Life." The first edition, published in Boston in 1875, did not contain "The Valiant Soldiers." Later editions printed in Battle Creek in 1878, 1881, and 1884 have the song inserted on a blank page between the original "Narrative" and the "Book of Life" sections. Titus's note that the song was composed for the First Michigan Regiment appears to be one more of the minor inaccuracies she introduced into her editions of the Narrative. There is no question that Truth sang the song; Painter cites a newspaper account of Truth singing a variation of "The Valiant Soldiers" in 1879 to the black settlers in Kansas known as Exodusters. But there is no evidence Truth composed the lyrics before Lindley Miller's "Marching Song" was published and widely distributed.
