= Goodrich's Landing =

Goodrich's Landing may refer to:

- Goodrich's Landing, Louisiana, an extinct settlement along the Mississippi River in also-extinct Carroll Parish
- Battle of Goodrich's Landing (1863)
