= Battle of Blair's Landing =

Battle of the American Civil War

Coordinates: 31.941°N 93.289°W

- Part of the Trans-Mississippi Theater of the American Civil War
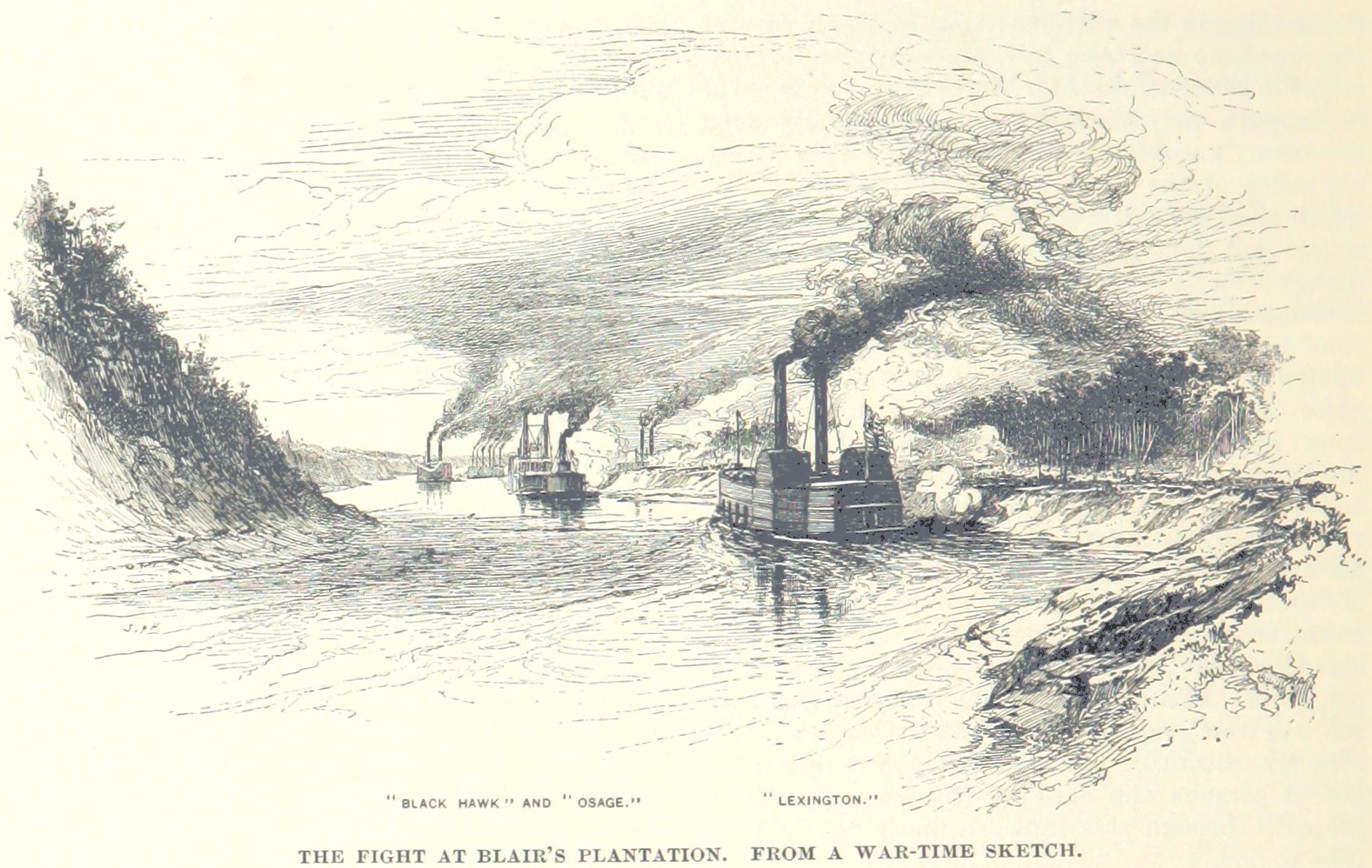
- Wartime sketch shows the fight at Blair's Plantation.
Date	April 12, 1864
Location	Red River Parish, Louisiana
Result	Union victory

Belligerents
United States	(Confederate States of America) Confederate States

Commanders and leaders
David Dixon Porter; Thomas Kilby Smith	Tom Green †

Units involved
XVII Corps; Mississippi River Squadron	Green's cavalry

Strength
2,500 men 6 gunboats, 20 transports	750–1,000 men 1–2 batteries

Casualties and losses
57–60, damaged vessels	57, disabled guns

The Battle of Blair's Landing (April 12, 1864) saw a Confederate cavalry-artillery force commanded by Brigadier General Tom Green attack several Union gunboats led by Rear Admiral David Dixon Porter and soldiers in river transports under Brigadier General Thomas Kilby Smith in Red River Parish, Louisiana. Green's force attempted but failed to stop the retreat of Porter's and Smith's forces downstream in an action that was part of the Red River Campaign of the American Civil War. The only significant casualty during the fighting was Green, who was killed by an artillery round.

== Background ==
=== Campaign ===
President Abraham Lincoln and Major General Henry Halleck wanted a Union army to establish a foothold in Texas by way of the Red River. Major General Nathaniel P. Banks, commander of the Department of the Gulf was ordered to organize an expedition in cooperation with Major Generals William T. Sherman and Frederick Steele. While Steele moved south from Little Rock, Arkansas, with 15,000 troops, Banks moved in two columns. A 17,000-strong column ascended Bayou Teche and joined 10,000 men that came up the Red River under Major General Andrew Jackson Smith to occupy Alexandria, Louisiana on March 18. The Red River force was on loan from Sherman and was accompanied by 13 ironclad and 7 light-draft gunboats from Porter's Mississippi River Squadron.

After A. J. Smith's force won two minor actions at Fort DeRussy (March 14) and Henderson's Hill (March 21), Banks' army started marching upriver and reached Natchitoches on April 2. Porter started upriver with 6 gunboats and T. K. Smith's division of the XVII Corps aboard transports. They planned to meet with Banks' army at Springfield Landing, 110 mi (177 km) below Shreveport. However, Major General Richard Taylor drubbed the Union army at the Battle of Mansfield on April 8, forcing Banks to retreat. Reinforced, Taylor attacked Banks again at the Battle of Pleasant Hill on April 9, but was repulsed. Nevertheless, Banks withdrew to Grand Ecore near Natchitoches on the Red River.

=== River operations ===
On April 7, Porter and T. K. Smith left Grand Ecore and headed upstream on the Red River. Porter commanded the gunboats USS Cricket, USS Chillicothe, USS Fort Hindman, USS Lexington, USS Neosho, and USS Osage, the last two being monitors. There were also several auxiliary vessels. T. K. Smith led 2,500 Union soldiers on 20 river transports. Water level in the river was low, causing the naval vessels to proceed at a slow pace. That day, the expedition reached Campti where it briefly landed a regiment to clear the town and anchored for the night.

On April 8, the expedition reached Coushatta Point where it anchored for the night. Colonel Lyman M. Ward's brigade was sent ahead by land to chase away a Confederate force reported 3 mi (4.8 km) farther ahead at Coushatta Chute. On April 9, the vessels advanced as far as Nine-Mile Bend before anchoring for the evening. On April 10, the expedition reached the mouth of Loggy Bayou near Springfield Landing where they found the Confederates sank the riverboat New Falls City loaded with bricks and mud athwart the channel. While they pondered what to do, a courier arrived from Banks saying his army was defeated and falling back to Grand Ecore. Porter and T. K. Smith decided to obey Banks' verbal instructions to return to Grand Ecore.

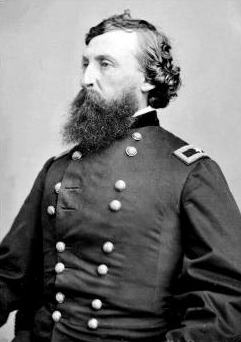
T. Kilby Smith

The warships and other vessels were unable to turn around because the river was so narrow. So, they all had to back down the river with the last vessel in the lead. By the morning of April 11, after working all night, the ships were all able to turn around and proceed downriver bow-first. By this time, groups of Confederates on the east bank under Brigadier General St. John Richardson Liddell peppered the expedition with rifle fire, to which the warships replied with cannon fire. That day, the Chillicothe ran hard aground in mid-afternoon and was not freed for several hours. The expedition anchored for the night at Coushatta Chute, having received written orders from Banks to proceed to Grand Ecore.

By late afternoon on April 12, the expedition reached Blair's Landing. Several vessels were damaged by snags, logs, tree stumps, collisions, and sandbanks as the river's stage fell. The transport Hastings was tied up to the west bank to make repairs. The transport Alice Vivian, loaded with 400 horses, was hard aground in mid-stream with the Osage aground right behind her. The transport Rob Roy was behind both, unable to pass. The transport Black Hawk was lashed alongside the Osage and the Lexington was near the east bank. All but five of the river transports had made it safely downstream.

== Battle ==
=== Confederate plans ===
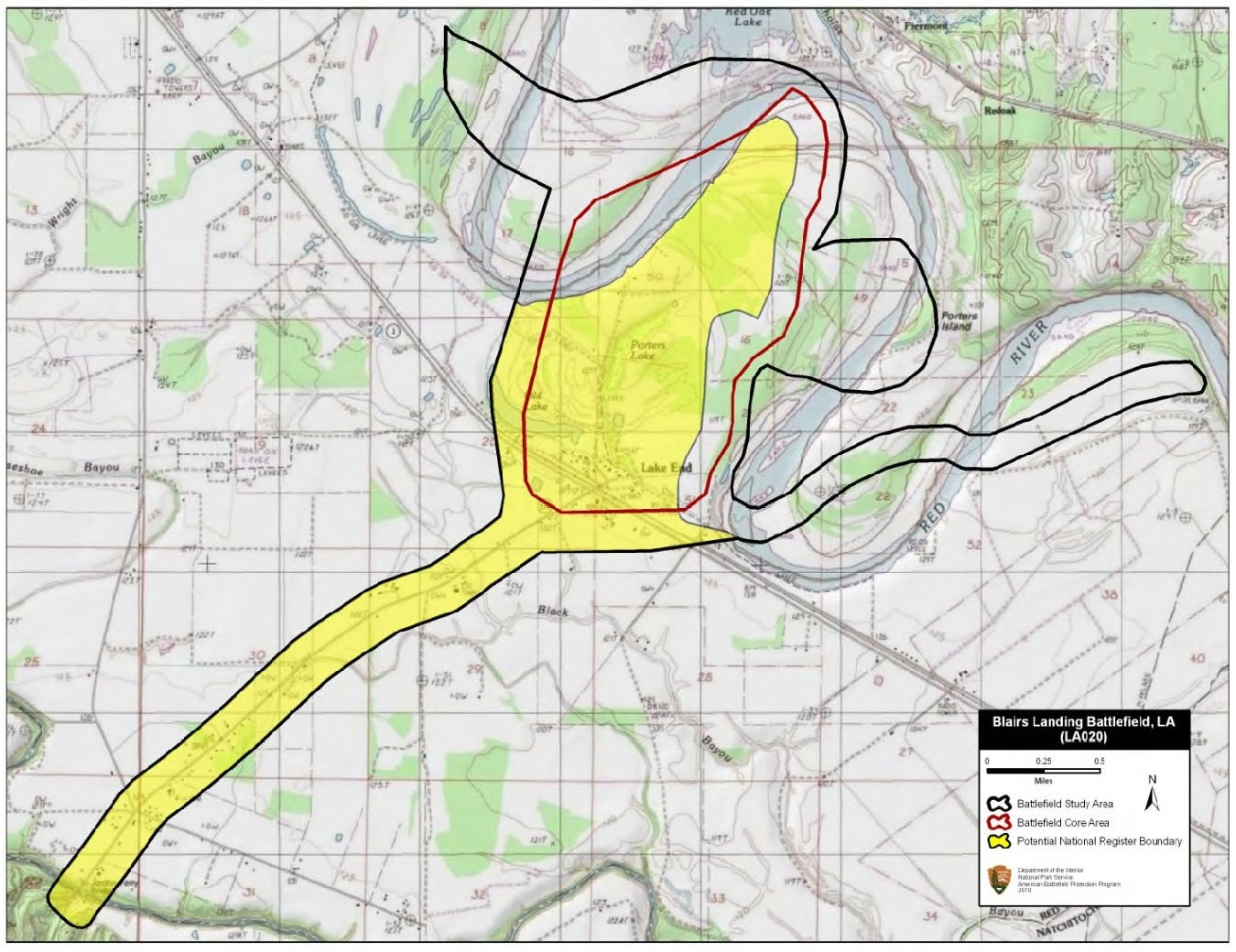
Map of Blair's Landing Battlefield core and study areas by the American Battlefield Protection Program.

After the Confederate setback at Pleasant Hill, Taylor met with his superior, General Edmund Kirby Smith who decided to take most of the infantry north to fight Steele's Federal force in Arkansas. Kirby Smith left Taylor with only 5,200 troops to face Banks. He feared that Steele might reach the Confederate supply base at Shreveport. Kirby Smith was convinced that if Taylor had more soldiers, he would not be able to feed them in the desolated country between Mansfield and Alexandria. Taylor tried to argue, but he was overruled. Nevertheless, Taylor still believed that he could destroy Banks' army.

On the morning of April 10, Brigadier General Hamilton P. Bee's cavalry rode to Pleasant Hill and found that Banks' army abandoned the battlefield and was in full retreat. Bee gave chase, but the Federals burned Double Bridge, stopping pursuit. At dawn on April 11, Taylor ordered Colonel Arthur P. Bagby Jr. to intercept Porter's expedition at Grand Bayou Landing. Bagby was delayed in crossing the 330 ft (101 m) wide Bayou Pierre and only reached Grand Bayou Landing after Porter's vessels had passed. After being notified of the situation, Taylor ordered Green to intercept Porter. At 6:00 pm on April 11, Green set out with the regiments of Colonels William Henry Parsons, Nicholas C. Gould, and Peter C. Woods, (the 12th Texas, 23rd Texas, and 36th Texas Cavalry Regiments, respectively) and two artillery batteries. With difficulty, Green crossed Bayou Pierre at Jordon's Ferry, getting only three cannons across, and rushed his horsemen forward in an all-night march.

=== Action ===
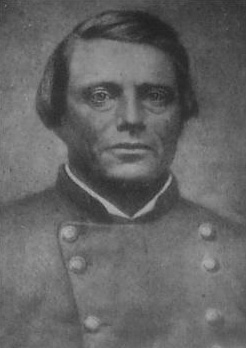
Thomas Green

According to William Riley Brooksher, on April 12 in the afternoon, Green arrived at Blair's Plantation with about 1,000 soldiers and Captain John A. A. West's Grosse Tete (Louisiana) Flying Artillery. Arthur W. Bergeron Jr. stated that only the battery's 12-pounder howitzer section was present during the action. Mark M. Boatner III credited Green with 750 men and two batteries. Green assigned Parsons to take charge of the attacking force while Brigadier General James Patrick Major commanded a small reserve. Parsons led his dismounted cavalrymen to the trees on the bluff overlooking the riverbank. This movement was spotted by the pilot of the Black Hawk, who alerted the other vessels.

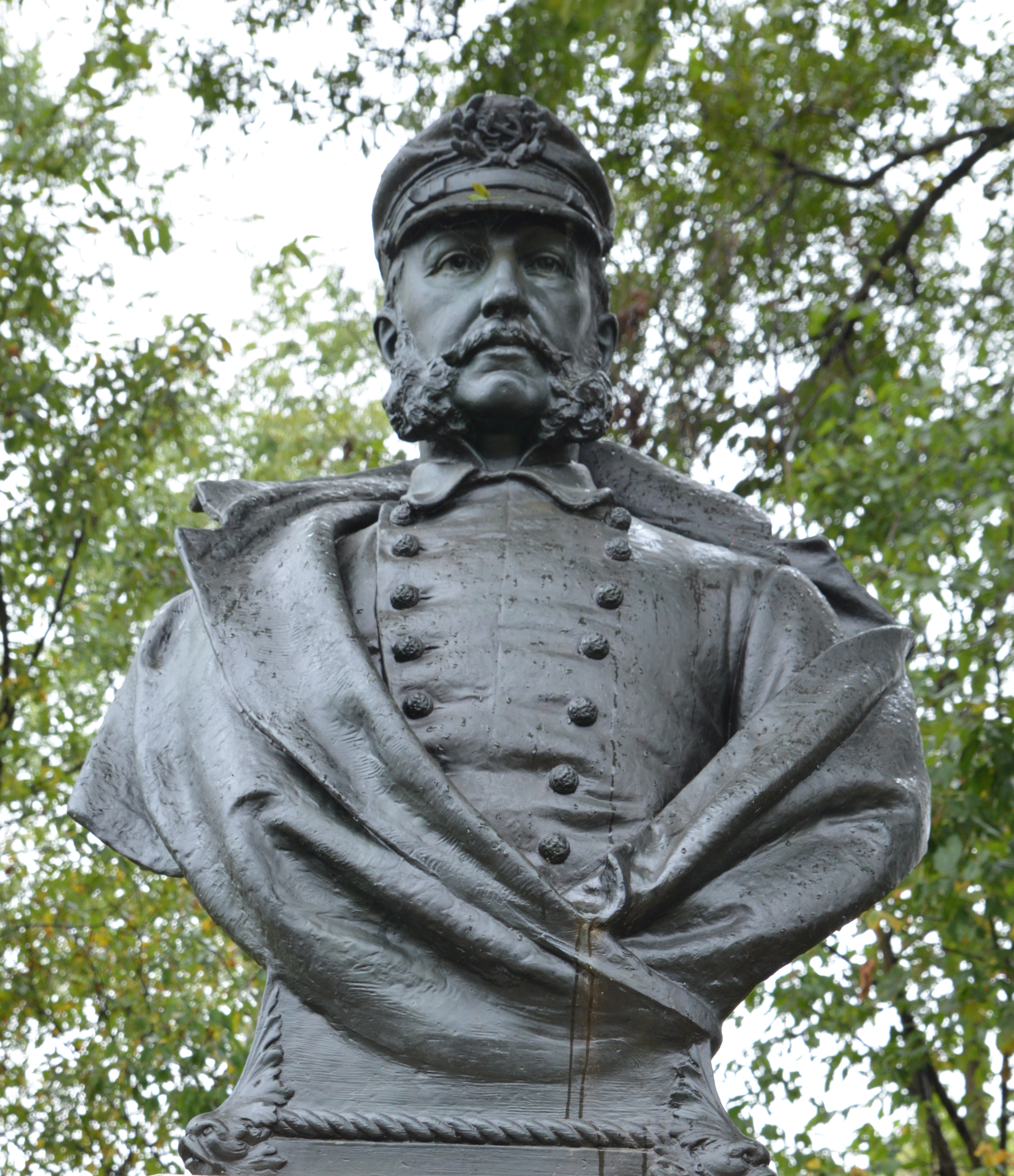
T. O. Selfridge Jr.

Lieutenant Thomas Oliver Selfridge Jr., commanding the Osage, ordered the Lexington into action. In response, Lieutenant George M. Bache moved the Lexington toward the river's edge, 8 in (203 mm) guns blazing, disabling one Confederate gun. At this, Green's cavalrymen opened a terrific blast of small arms fire at the Union vessels. The Union infantry aboard the transports fired back, while shielded by cotton bales and sacks of oats. A section of guns on the transport Emerald, a howitzer aboard the Black Hawk, and four heavy Parrott rifles on the Rob Roy added to the fire directed at Green's dismounted troopers. John D. Winters asserted that the guns and Union infantry were first landed on the east bank before they came into action. The Confederate battery fired on the Hastings, but its first shot fell short. As the Hastings quickly steamed away, more missed shots passed overhead.

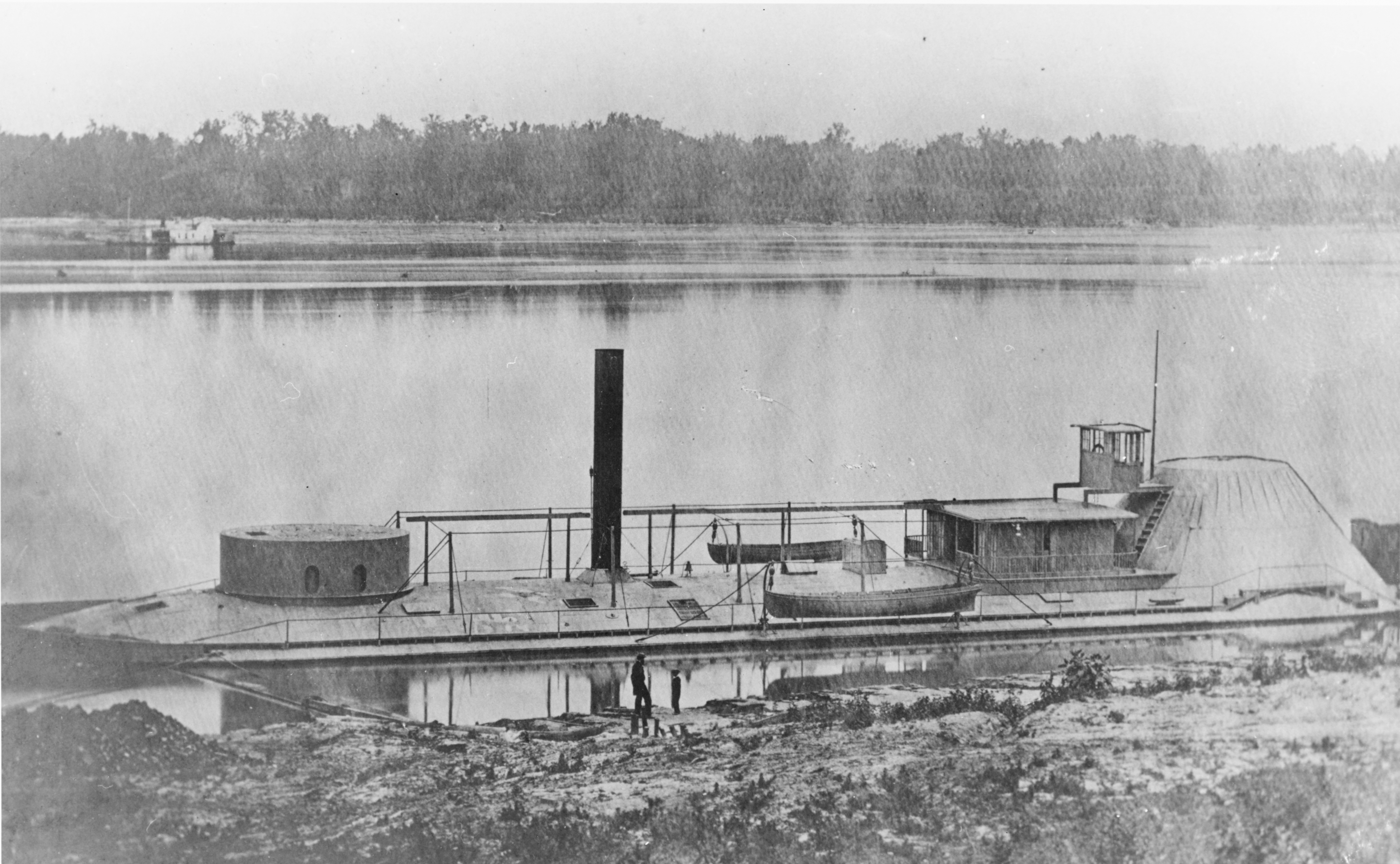
USS Osage

Despite the huge volume of small arms fire from both sides, casualties were relatively light. The Confederates were protected by the river's high bank while the Federals were helped by their improvised defenses. The fire finally became so intense that the crew and passengers of the Black Hawk took refuge aboard the Osage. Porter later remarked that, "there was not a place six inches square that was not perforated by a bullet", on the Black Hawk. The Osage worked itself free of the sandbar and moved toward the west bank, firing her 11 in (279 mm) guns. Its gunners soon ran out of canister shot and grapeshot, so they substituted shrapnel shell with one second fuses. The Confederate artillery horses were killed, forcing the men to manhandle their guns into new positions when the Union gunboats found the range.

The Neosho appeared, and, together with the Lexington and Fort Hindman, blasted the west bank with canister and grapeshot for 2 mi (3.2 km). At the same time, the Alice Vivian drifted off the shoal, which meant that the fleet could now continue downriver. All the Confederate guns were out of action, so Green decided to charge the vessels. This might have been possible because some of the vessels were in water only shoulder-deep to a horse. One Texan wrote that Green, "was a man who, when out of whiskey, was a mild mannered gentleman, but when in good supply of old burst-head was all fight." Perhaps made reckless from alcohol intake, Green yelled at the men of Woods' regiment that, "he was going to show them how to fight." Aboard the Osage, Selfridge saw an officer on a white horse on the riverbank and had a cannon fired at him, after which the man disappeared. Green was killed by an artillery projectile that took the top of his head off.

== Aftermath ==
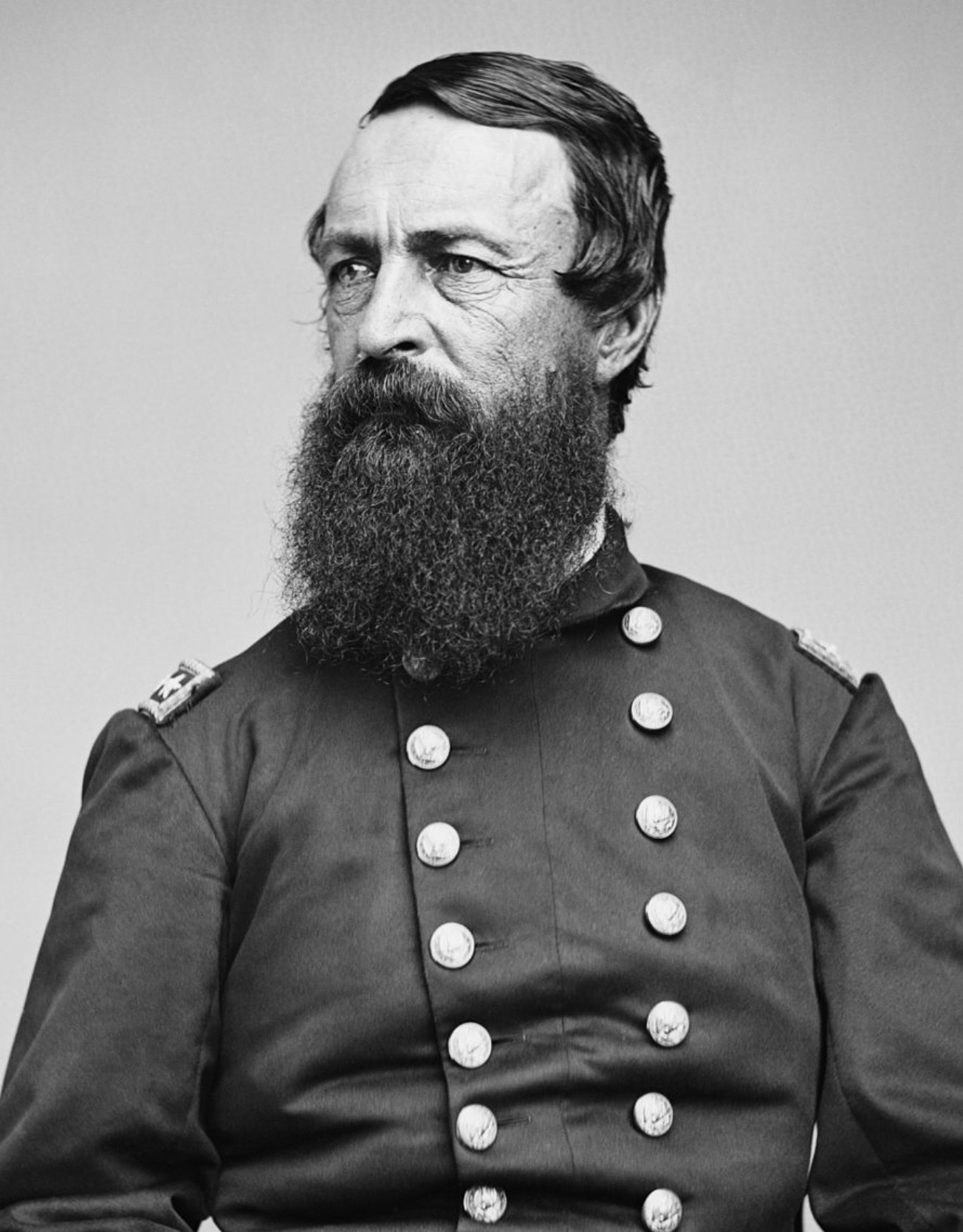
David D. Porter

The action lasted about one hour, ending at dusk when the Union expedition got underway, and the Confederates withdrew. Though both sides believed that they had inflicted heavy losses on their opponents, in fact losses were relatively light. T. K. Smith left his dead and wounded in the hands of the Confederates. Taylor wrote that Green's loss was "an irreparable one." Green was replaced by Bee as the commander of Taylor's cavalry. Boatner stated that the Union army sustained 50 casualties while the navy lost 7. The National Park Service listed 60 Union and 57 Confederate casualties. That night, the Union expedition traveled downstream until 1:00 am when it anchored for the night. Major led the Confederate cavalry from Blair's Landing back to Pleasant Hill.

On April 13, the transport John Warner went hard aground, forcing the expedition to halt its progress. Liddell set up two sections of 6-pounder guns on a high bluff at Bouledeau's Point and proceeded to fire on the Union fleet from the east bank. One section belonged to Captain Archibald J. Cameron's Louisiana battery. The distance was too great and the caliber of the guns too small to do much damage. Nevertheless, fearing that a lucky shot might set off an ammunition explosion, Porter and T. K. Smith sent most of the vessels downriver, headed by the transport Sioux City. At the same time, Osage fired on Liddell's guns, silencing them.

Hearing that the expedition was in trouble, Banks sent A. J. Smith with two brigades, two batteries, and some cavalry to the east bank at 4:00 pm on April 13. After a 12 mi (19.3 km) march, these troops reached Campti, found most of the fleet, and drove away Liddell's forces. Upstream, the Fort Hindman finally succeeded in pulling the John Warner free. Meanwhile, the transport Iberville grounded near Campti and the John Warner stopped to help. These last two stragglers caught up to the rest of the expedition at Grand Ecore on April 16. A witness recalled that the expedition's vessels were riddled and their smoke-stacks looked like "pepper boxes". When they left Campti, A. J. Smith's troops burned the town to the ground.
