= 46th United States Colored Infantry Regiment =

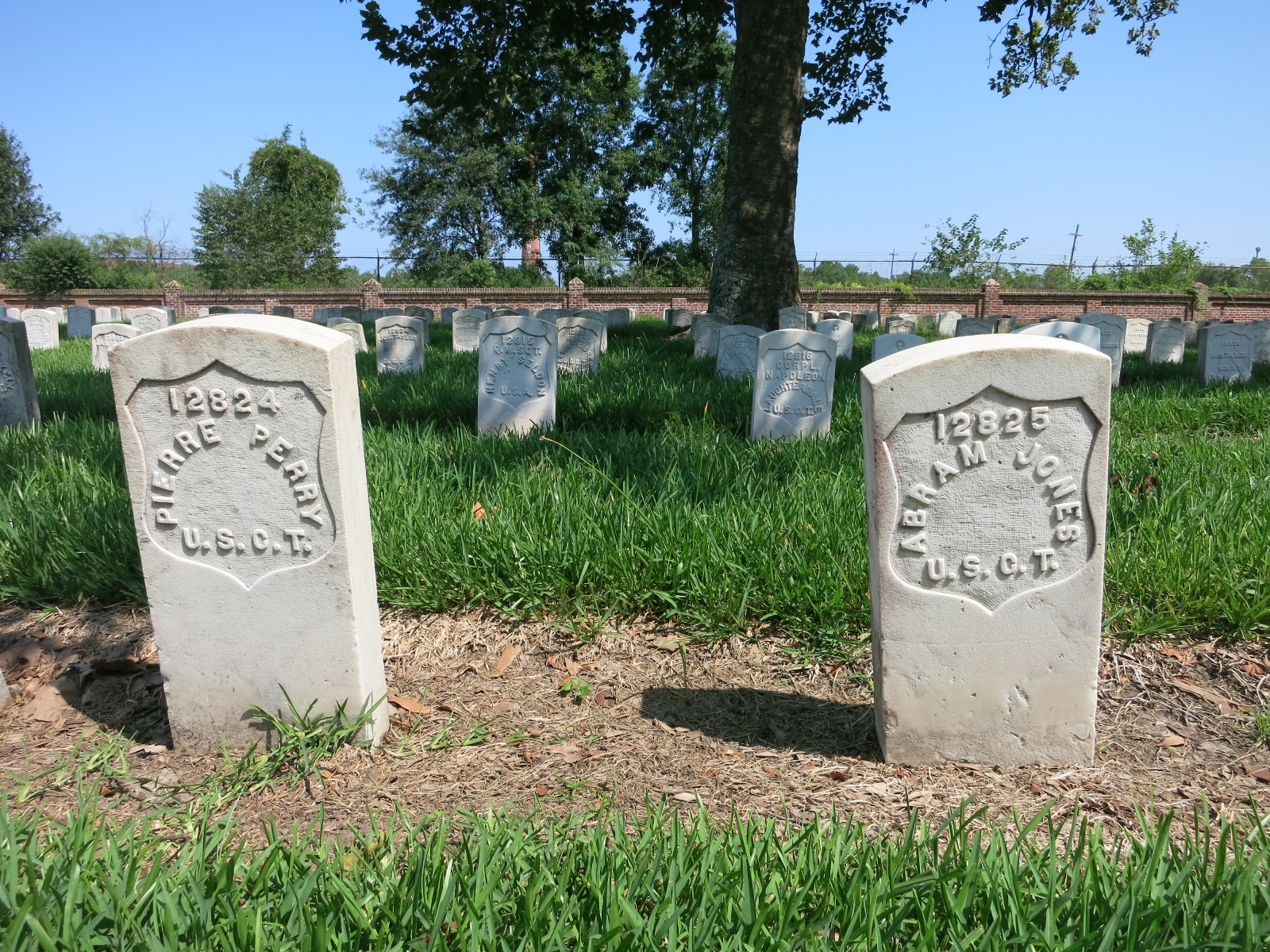
- Graves of U.S. Colored Troops are at Chalmette National Cemetery in New Orleans. Records show that Abram Jones (right) served in the 46th USCT.
- Active: August 11, 1864 – January 30, 1866
- Disbanded: January 30, 1866
- Country: United States
- Allegiance: Union
- Branch: Infantry
- Size: Regiment
- Nickname: 1st Arkansas Infantry Regiment (African Descent)
- Engagements: American Civil War

Commanders
- Colonel: William F. Wood
- Lt. Colonel: James W. Campbell
- Major: George Burson

The 46th United States Colored Infantry was an infantry regiment that served in the Union Army during the American Civil War. The unit was originally designated as the 1st Arkansas Infantry Regiment (African Descent). The regiment was composed of African American enlisted men commanded by white officers and was authorized by the Bureau of Colored Troops which was created by the United States War Department on May 22, 1863.

== Organization ==
Following the issuance of the Emancipation Proclamation, an organization of African-American troops was commenced in the Mississippi River Valley under the personal supervision of the adjutant-general of the army, Lorenzo Thomas. His first regiment was sworn into service on May 1, 1863, as the 1st Arkansas Volunteers of African Descent, The 1st Arkansas was one of four regiments of African Americans that was raised in Helena, Phillips County, an important Union held fortified city and naval port on the Mississippi River.

Twenty-one-year-old Minos Miller of the 36th Iowa Infantry, stationed at Helena, Arkansas wrote in January 1863:

[W]e are rejoicing today over Brags [sic] defeat [at Murfreesboro, Tennessee] and Old Abe's [Emancipation] Proclamation. We got the news last night at 8 o'clock that all the negros was free and them that was able for servis [sic] was to be armed and set to guarding foarts [sic]. I think the Union is safe and all will be over by the forth [sic] of July.

On April 7, Miller attended a speech by Adjutant General of the Army Lorenzo Thomas, who was promoting the raising of black regiments for service in the Union army (under white officers). Reaction to Thomas's address was so favorable that three companies of a hundred soldiers each were recruited immediately, forming the nucleus of the 1st Arkansas Volunteer Infantry Regiment (African Descent).

The regiment was organized Arkansas at large May 1, 1863, as the 1st Regiment Arkansas Volunteer Infantry (African Descent). The designation of the regiment was changed to 46th U.S. Colored Troops May 11, 1864. The 1st Arkansas soon left Helena for service in Louisiana.

== Service ==
The unit moved to Lake Providence, La., May 8–10, 1863, and then to Goodrich Landing and was on duty there until January, 1864. The regiment was attached to Post of Goodrich Landing, District of Northeast Louisiana, Dept. Tennessee, until January, 1864.

In June 1863, Confederates from Gaines's Landing, Arkansas, undertook an expedition to Lake Providence, Louisiana, in an effort to disrupt the Union supply lines supporting the Siege of Vicksburg. The Union had constructed fortifications on top of an old Indian mound about five miles northwest of Goodrich's Landing, guarding a military supply depot. The fort was occupied by two companies of the 1st Arkansas, African Descent. The Confederate Colonel William H. Parsons planned to attack the fort on June 29, and some skirmishing occurred before elements of Confederate Brigadier General James Camp Tappan's brigade of Arkansas infantry arrived. Facing odds of more than 10 to one, the Union commander of the fort agreed to surrender on the condition that the white officers be treated as prisoners of war. Confederates had threatened to execute white officers along with African Americans found under arms. The Confederates move the captured African American soldiers from the 1st Arkansas west to a railhead at Delhi, Louisiana where they could be moved further west into Confederate held territory. Confederate Maj. Gen. John G. Walker admitted in his report concerning the Mound: "I consider it an unfortunate circumstance that any armed negroes were captured," for he had already been warned by Lt. Gen. Kirby Smith that black soldiers were not to be taken prisoner.

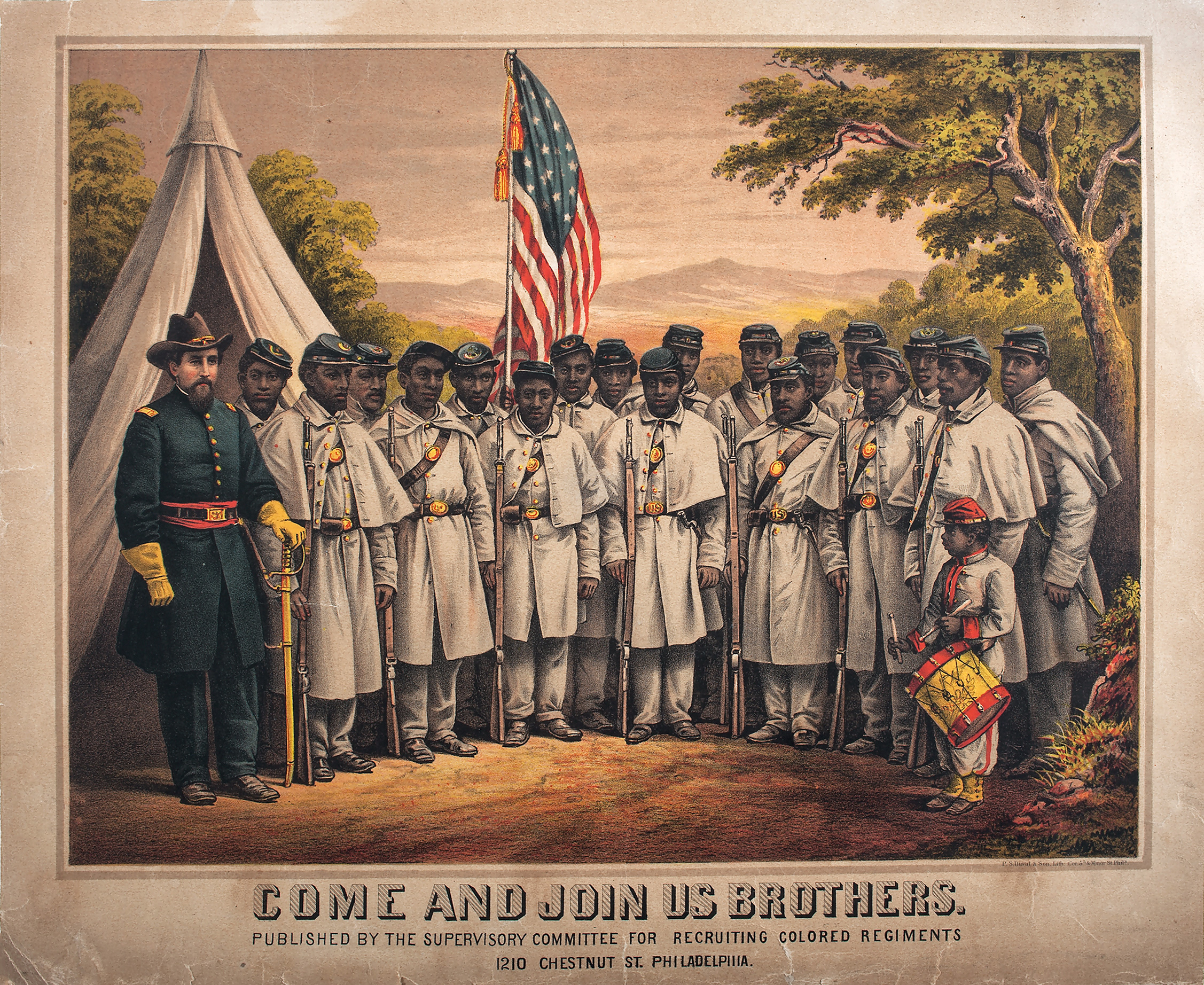
Recruiting poster for U.S Colored Troops

The unit was involved in the following engagements while stationed at Goodrich Landing:

- Skirmish at Mound Plantation June 24, 1863.
- Actions at Lake Providence and Mound Plantation June 28, 1863.
- Action at Goodrich Landing June 29, 1863."

The unit was then attached to the 1st Colored Brigade, District of Vicksburg, Miss., until May, 1864. The unit was then attached to 2nd Brigade, 1st Division, U. S. Colored Troops, District of Vicksburg, Miss., till January, 1865.

The unit was attached to the Post and Defenses of Memphis, Tenn., District West Tennessee, until February, 1865. The regiment was ordered to Memphis, Tenn., in January, 1865, and assigned garrison duty there until February, 1865.

The regiment was included in a list of regiment serving on the Mississippi River sent by Major General Edward R. S. Canby to Lieutenant General Ulysses S. Grant on March 7, 1865. The unit, still under the command of Colonel Wood had 609 effectives of an aggregate strength of 728.

The regiment was next ordered to New Orleans, La., on February 23, 1865, and was on duty there till May 4, 1865. The unit was assigned to New Orleans, La., Dept. of the Gulf, until May, 1865.

Finally the regiment was ordered to Brazos Santiago, Texas, May 4, 1865. The regiment pulled duty at Clarksville and Brownsville on the Rio Grande, Texas, until January, 1866. The regiment assisted in attempting to prevent Confederate forces from avoiding surrender by entering Mexico. The unit was reported as being at Brazos, Texas, with 490 men on June 10, 1865, and mustered out on January 30, 1866.

The 1st Arkansas (African Descent) had its own marching song written by Captain Lindley Miller of the 1st Arkansas. The song was sung to the tune of "John Brown's Body" and was published in 1864. The opening stanza ran:

Oh, we're the bully soldiers of the "First of Arkansas,"

We are fighting for the Union, we are fighting for the law,

We can hit a Rebel further than a white man ever saw,

As we go marching on.

== See also ==
- List of Arkansas Civil War Union units
- List of United States Colored Troops Civil War Units
- United States Colored Troops
- Arkansas in the American Civil War

== Bibliography ==
- Desmond Walls Allen, ARKANSAS DAMNED YANKEES: An Index to Union Soldiers in Arkansas Regiments, Arkansas Research, Inc. ISBN 0-941765-12-1.
- Bearss, Edwin Cole. Steele's Retreat from Camden and the Battle of Jenkins' Ferry. Little Rock: Arkansas Civil War Centennial Commission, 1967.
- Burkhart, George S. Confederate Rage, Yankee Wrath: No Quarter in the Civil War. Carbondale: Southern Illinois University Press, 2007.
- Christ, Mark K., ed. (2003). 'All Cut to Pieces and Gone to Hell': The Civil War, Race Relations, and the Battle of Poison Spring. August House. ISBN 978-0-87483-736-0.
- "The Civil War: Search for Soldiers (Abram Jones)". National Park Service. 2020.
- Glatthaar, Joseph T. Forged in Battle: The Civil War Alliance of Black Soldiers and White Officers. New York: Free Press, 1990.
- Hargrove, Hondon B. Black Union Soldiers in the Civil War. Jefferson, NC: McFarland & Company, 2003.
- Lause, Mark A. Race and Radicalism in the Union Army. Urbana: University of Illinois Press, 2009.
- Nichols, Ronnie A. (Fall 2013). "Emancipation of Black Union Soldiers in Little Rock, 1863–1865". Pulaski County Historical Review. 61: 76–85.
- Robertson, Brian K. (2007). "'Will They Fight? Ask the Enemy': United States Colored Troops at Big Creek, Arkansas, July 26, 1864". The Arkansas Historical Quarterly. 66 (3): 320–332. JSTOR 40028108. ProQuest 213350141.
- Trudeau, Noah Andre. Like Men of War: Black Troops in the Civil War 1862–1865. Boston: Back Bay Books, 1999.
- Urwin, Gregory J. W. Black Flag over Dixie: Racial Atrocities and Reprisals in the Civil War. Carbondale: Southern Illinois University Press, 2005.
- Walls, David (2007). "Marching Song of the First Arkansas Colored Regiment: A Contested Attribution". The Arkansas Historical Quarterly. 66 (4): 401–421. JSTOR 40031121. ProQuest 213375464.
- Wilson, J. T. (1888). The Black Phalanx: A history of the Negro soldiers of the United States in the war of 1775-1812, 1861-'65. Hartford, Conn: American Pub. Co.
