= Rasta views on race =

Afrocentric ideology

The Abrahamic religion of Rastafari emerged in 1930s Jamaica. It centered on an Afrocentric ideology and from its origins placed importance on racial issues.

According to Clarke, Rastafari is "concerned above all else with black consciousness, with rediscovering the identity, personal and racial, of black people". The Rastafari movement began among Afro-Jamaicans who wanted to reject the British colonial culture that dominated Jamaica and replace it with a new identity based on a reclamation of their African heritage. Barnett says that Rastafari aims to overcome the belief in the inferiority of black people, and the superiority of white people. According to Alhassan, Rastafari does this by centring Africa and blackness in order to decentre Europe and whiteness. She also says that by asserting the divinity of Haile Selassie and Empress Menen Asfaw, Rastas "radically assert humanity for all Black people". Rastafari is therefore Afrocentric, equating blackness with the African continent, and endorsing Pan-Africanism.

== Views on race ==
There is no uniform Rasta view on race. Black supremacy was a theme early in the movement, with the belief in a distinctly black African race that was superior to other racial groups. This history has opened the religion to accusations of racism. While some Rastas still hold such beliefs, black supremacy has waned in the movement since at least the 1970s, and non-black Rastas are now widely accepted.

In 1971, Joseph Owens reported: "notwithstanding certain statements with apparently racist import, the essence of Rastafarian teaching is that all races are basically equal." He later criticised scholar Leonard E. Barrett for quoting non-Rastas such as Marcus Garvey and Elijah Muhammad to evidence Rastas' black supremacist views, arguing he gave "undue emphasis on [the] racialist features of the doctrine". In 1983, Cashmore noted an "implicit potential" for racism in Rasta beliefs but said that racism was not "intrinsic" to the religion. In 1986, Clarke said that some Rastas had acknowledged racism in the movement, primarily against Europeans and Asians, and that some sects rejected the notion that a white European could ever be a legitimate Rasta. He noted, however, that other Rasta sects believe an "African" identity is not inherently linked to black skin but whether an individual displays an African "attitude" or "spirit".

In 1988, Barrett described black supremacist language as "an echo of the days of Garvey" and that "despite the rhetoric", Rastas were not anti-white and many white people had been accepted by Rastafari (sometimes more easily than other black people). Similarly, Campbell identified Pan-Africanist white Rastafari in Apartheid-era South Africa in the 1980s, who joined the movement because they were seeking "the development of a non-racist culture" in the country.

Rastas often cite an anti-war speech Haile Selassie gave to the UN in 1963 in support of racial acceptance. In his speech, Selassie repudiated racism and fascism, and said, "We must become members of a new race." This speech heavily inspired the lyrics of Bob Marley's 1977 song "War".

== Covenant with Jah ==
Rastas typically believe that black Africans are God's chosen people, meaning that they made a covenant with him and thus have a special responsibility. Many Rastafari espouse the view that this, the true identity of black Africans, has been lost and needs to be reclaimed.

Practitioners of Rastafari often identify with the ancient Israelites as God's chosen people in the Old Testament. Some Rastas believe that black people, or Rastas specifically, are the descendants or reincarnations (metaphorically or literally) of this ancient people, though this view is less common in contemporary Rastafari.

== Exile in Babylon ==
Rastafari teaches that the black African diaspora are exiles living in "Babylon", a term which it applies to Western society. For Rastas, European colonialism and global capitalism are regarded as manifestations of Babylon, while police and soldiers are viewed as its agents. The term "Babylon" is adopted because of its Biblical associations. In the Old Testament, Babylon is the Mesopotamian city where the Israelites were held captive, exiled from their homeland, between 597 and 586 BCE; Rastas compare the exile of the Israelites in Mesopotamia to the exile of the African diaspora outside Africa. Rastas perceive the exile of the black African diaspora in Babylon as an experience of great suffering, with the term "suffering" having a significant place in Rasta discourse.

In the New Testament "Babylon" is used as a euphemism for the Roman Empire, which was regarded as acting in a destructive manner akin to the way in which the ancient Babylonians acted. The Book of Revelation suggests the destruction of the Roman Empire will make way for the restoration of Zion for God's chosen people; for Rastas this suggests the oppressive forces of Babylon will eventually be destroyed so they can return to Africa (either figuratively or literally).

Rastas view Babylon as being responsible for both the Atlantic slave trade, which removed enslaved Africans from their continent, and ongoing poverty in the African diaspora. Rastas believe Biblical scripture explains the Atlantic slave trade, and that the enslavement, exile, and exploitation of black Africans was punishment for failing to live up to their status as Jah's chosen people. Many Rastas, adopting a Pan-Africanist ethos, have criticised the division of Africa into nation-states, regarding this as a Babylonian development, and are often hostile to capitalist resource extraction from the continent. Rastas seek to delegitimise and destroy Babylon, something often conveyed in the Rasta aphorism "Chant down Babylon". Rastas often expect the white-dominated society to dismiss their beliefs as false, and when this happens they see it as confirmation of the correctness of their faith.

== Return to Zion ==
A map of Ethiopia, sometimes called "Zion" by Rastas

Rastas view Zion as an ideal to which they aspire. As with "Babylon", this term comes from the Bible, where it refers to an idealised Jerusalem. Rastas use "Zion" either for Ethiopia specifically or for Africa more broadly. Many Rastas use the term "Ethiopia" as a synonym for Africa, following its usage in English translations of the Bible. Rastas in Ghana, for instance, describe themselves as already living within "Ethiopia". Other Rastas apply the term "Zion" to Jamaica or they use it to describe a state of mind. Rastas believe that Africa, as the Promised Land, will allow them to escape the domination and degradation they experience in Babylon.

=== Repatriation ===
During the first three decades of the Rastafari movement, it placed strong emphasis on the need for the African diaspora to be repatriated to Africa. To this end, various Rastas lobbied the Jamaican government and United Nations to oversee this resettlement process. Other Rastas organised their own transportation to the African continent. Critics of the movement have argued that the migration of the entire African diaspora to Africa is implausible, particularly as no African country would welcome this.

By the movement's fourth decade, the desire for physical repatriation to Africa had declined among Rastas, a change influenced by observation of the 1983–1985 famine in Ethiopia. Rather, many Rastas saw the idea of returning to Africa in a metaphorical sense, entailing the restoration of their pride and self-confidence as people of black African descent. The term "liberation before repatriation" began to be used within the movement. Some Rastas seek to transform Western society so that they may more comfortably live within it rather than seeking to move to Africa. There are nevertheless many Rastas who continue to emphasise the need for physical resettlement of the African diaspora in Africa.
