= 12th Texas Cavalry Regiment =

Confederate States military unit in the American Civil War

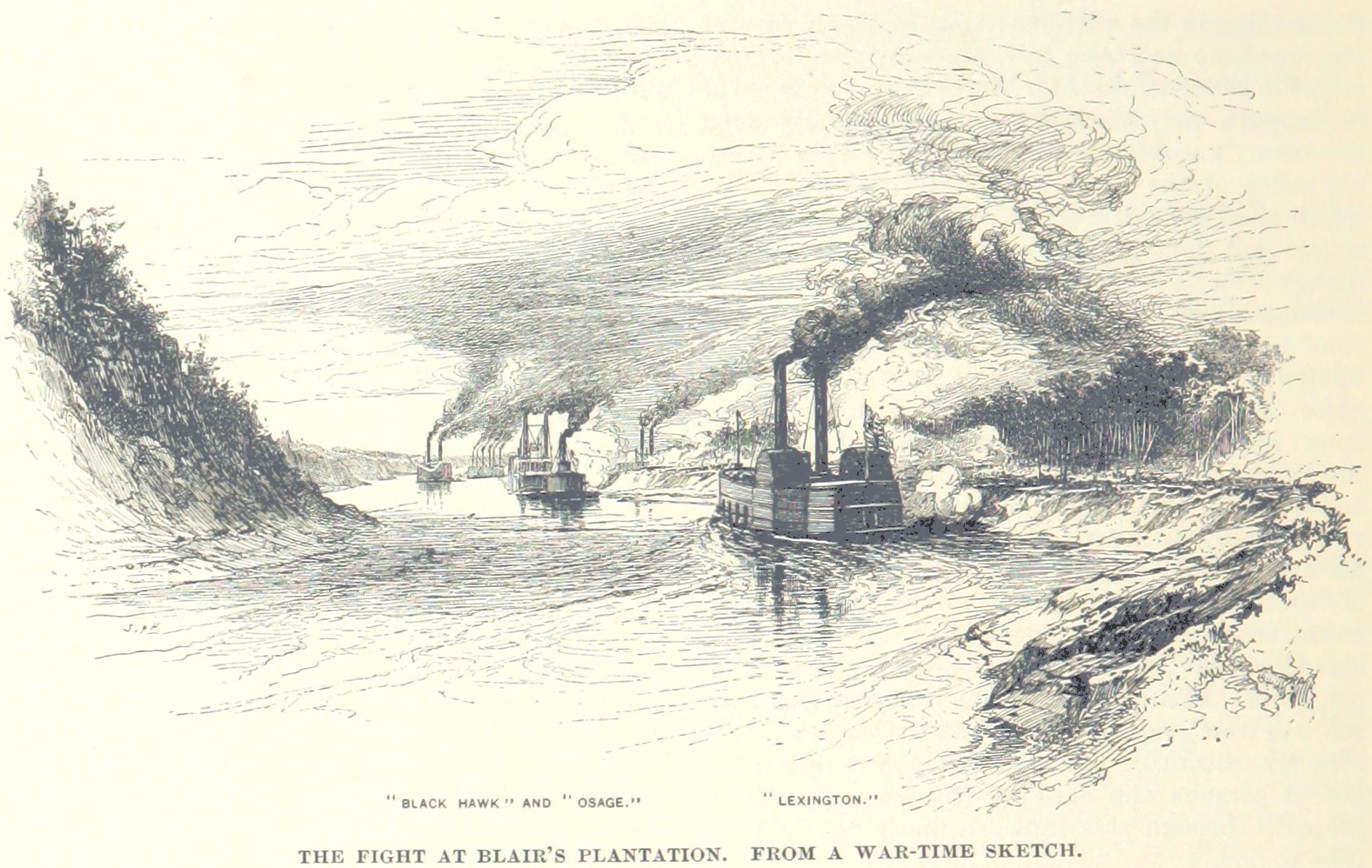
- At Blair's Landing on the Red River, the Confederates tried to stop a Federal flotilla without success.
- Active: 11 September 1861 – 23 May 1865
- Country: Confederate States of America
- Allegiance: Confederate States of America; Texas
- Branch: Confederate States Army
- Type: Cavalry
- Size: Regiment
- Nickname: Parsons's Regiment
- Engagements: American Civil War; Battle of Whitney's Lane (1862); Battle of Cotton Plant (1862); Battle of L'Anguille Ferry (1862); Battle of Goodrich's Landing (1863); Battle of Blair's Landing (1864); Battle of Yellow Bayou (1864)

Commanders
- Notable commanders: William H. Parsons

The 12th Texas Cavalry Regiment was a unit of mounted volunteers recruited in Texas that fought in the Confederate States Army during the American Civil War. The regiment was enrolled in state service in September 1861 and in Confederate service the following month. The regiment fought at Whitney's Lane, Cotton Plant, and L'Anguille Ferry in 1862, Goodrich's Landing in 1863, and Blair's Landing and Yellow Bayou in 1864. The unit also participated in numerous skirmishes and scouts. It disbanded in May 1865. Perhaps its most notable veteran was Albert Parsons, the teenaged brother of the unit's commanding officer, who would become a martyr of organized labor for his role in the Haymarket Affair.

== Formation ==
Soon after the war started in April 1861, William Henry Parsons, a Waco newspaper editor, began recruiting men for a cavalry regiment. On 11 September 1861 the unit organized at Rockett Springs near Waxahachie as the 4th Texas Dragoons with Parsons elected colonel. On 28 October the regiment was mustered into the Confederate Army as the 12th Texas Cavalry. The regiment enrolled approximately 940 men in 1861. A number of Texas counties were represented as follows:

Recruitment Areas of the 12th Texas Cavalry Regiment
Company	Nickname	Recruitment Area
A	Hill County Volunteers	Hill County
B	Freestone Boys	Freestone County
C	Johnson County Slashers	Johnson County
D	Bastrop Cavalry Company	Bastrop County
E	Ellis Grays	Ellis County
F	Ellis Rangers	Ellis County and Parker County
G	Kaufman Guards	Kaufman County
H	Ellis Blues	Ellis County
I	Williamson Bowies	Williamson County
K	Eutaw Blues	Limestone County

== History ==
=== 1862 ===
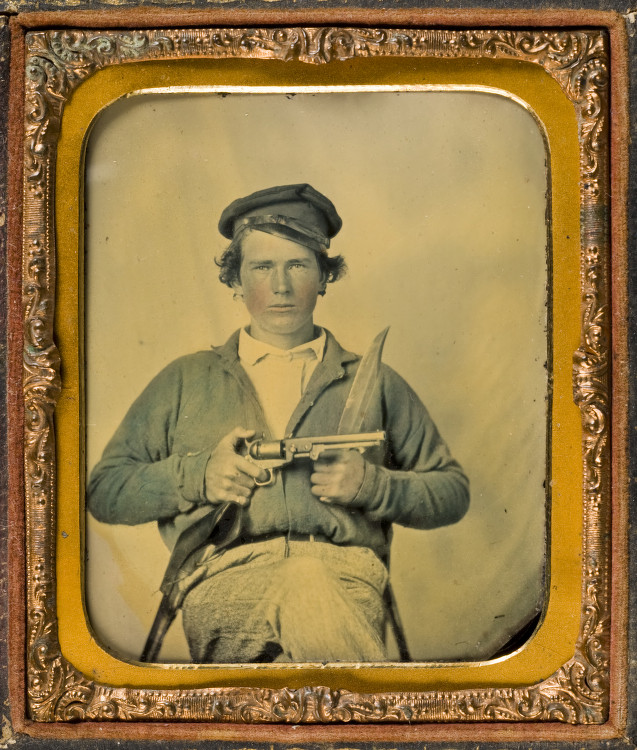
Private Japhet Collins after enlisting with the 4th Texas Dragoons. He served in the war and was paroled at Brenham, Texas in September 1865.

On 25 March 1862, Earl Van Dorn received an order from Albert Sidney Johnston to transfer his Army of the West to Corinth, Mississippi. Van Dorn proceeded to shift all available soldiers, ammunition, food, and weapons to the east side of the Mississippi River. In May 1862, the Union Army of the Southwest under Samuel Ryan Curtis invaded eastern Arkansas and captured Batesville. Thomas C. Hindman, the newly appointed Confederate commander in Arkansas, was appalled to find almost no soldiers or military equipment to defend Little Rock. Hindman began improvising an army and a logistical base. Before Hindman's arrival, John Selden Roane started to detain Texas cavalry regiments as they crossed Arkansas headed for Memphis, Tennessee. The 12th Texas Cavalry was one of the units appropriated to defend the state of Arkansas.

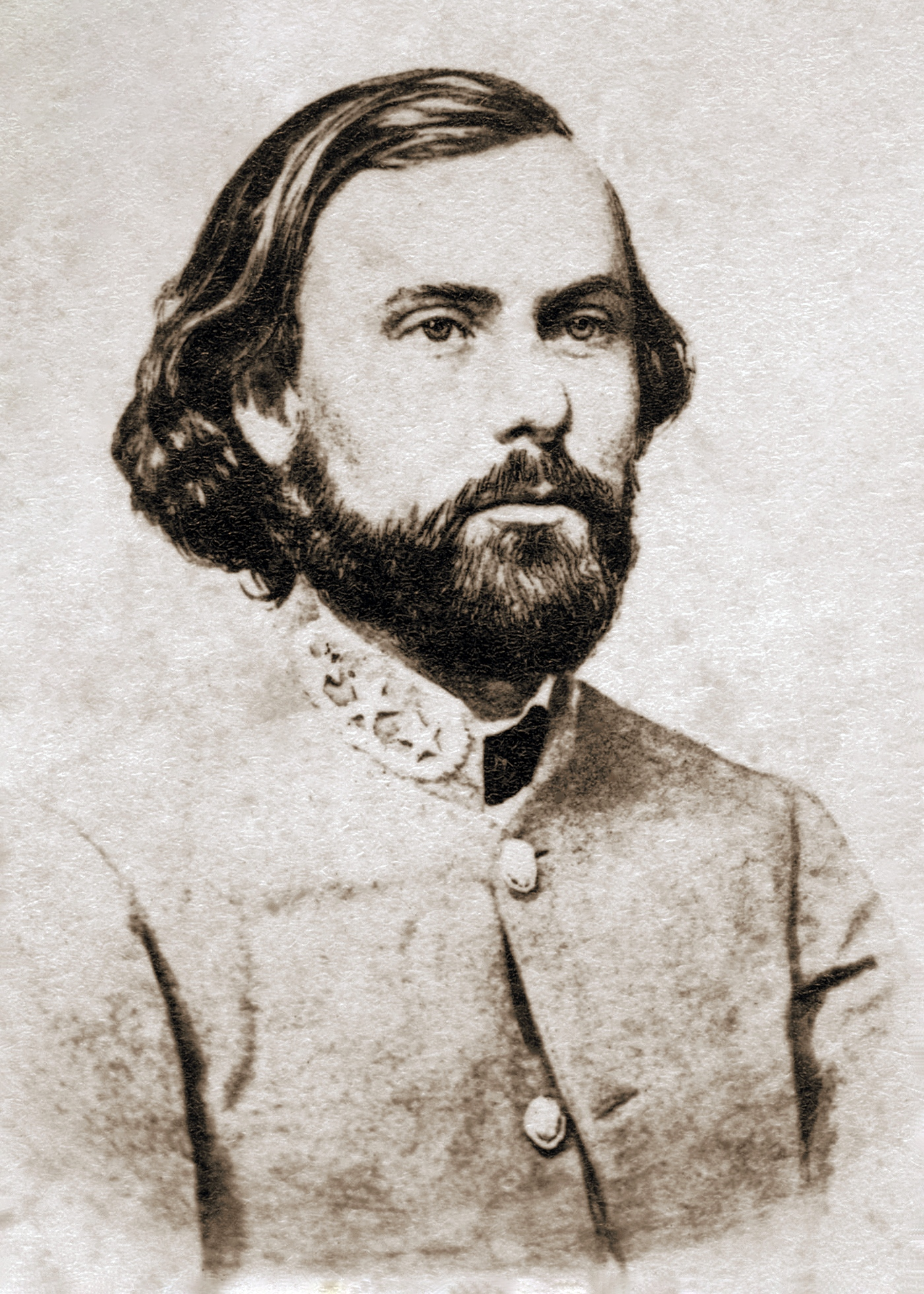
Thomas C. Hindman

The regiment fought at the Battle of Whitney's Lane on 19 May 1862. Before this skirmish, the local Union commander Peter J. Osterhaus reported to Curtis that Confederates and irregulars were harassing his division. At Whitney's Lane, the Texas cavalrymen surrounded a Union foraging party from the 17th Missouri Volunteer Infantry near Searcy. The Federals admitted losses of 15 killed, 32 wounded, and two missing; they claimed to have killed 18 Confederates. The Missourians complained that when they tried to surrender, their attackers yelled, "Damn you, we want no prisoners", and killed some of the Federal wounded. Curtis and Osterhaus called their attackers "armed bandits" and "outlaws" and threatened to shoot any prisoners taken. Another source stated that 100 troopers of the 12th Texas under Major Emory Rogers plus 50 local militia attacked a group of Union foragers at the intersection of Whitney's Lane and the West Point Road a few miles east of Searcy. They claimed to have inflicted losses of 22 killed and 33 wounded on their enemies while capturing a surgeon and four ambulance wagons. The Confederates reported losing four killed and several wounded.

The 12th Texas took part in the Battle of Cotton Plant on 7 July 1862. Unable to march to Little Rock due to breakdown of his supply line, Curtis moved his army south down the White River. He was opposed by Albert Rust with 5,000 Arkansas infantry and Texas cavalry. While crossing the Cache River, Curtis sent Charles Edward Hovey with 400 men and one gun to scout ahead. Near Parley Hill's plantation, the Federals bumped into 1,000 men from the 12th Texas and 16th Texas Cavalry Regiments under Parsons. After some fighting, the Texans gained the upper hand and forced part of Hovey's troops to retreat. But when the Texas cavalry galloped after their enemies, they were ambushed by three companies of the 33rd Illinois Infantry Regiment concealed in a cornfield. After a lull, 200 Union troops and two more cannons arrived as reinforcements to push back the Texans. Later in the day another Union brigade under William P. Benton appeared as additional reinforcements. Rust's troops withdrew behind another river and destroyed their boats. One Texan wrote that the 12th Texas lost 14 killed, 20 seriously wounded, 16 slightly wounded, and two missing.

The regiment attacked Curtis's supply line in the Battle of L'Anguille Ferry on 3 August 1862. On 29 July, the 1st Battalion of the 1st Wisconsin Volunteer Cavalry Regiment led by Lieutenant Colonel Oscar Hugh La Grange reached Marianna on the L'Anguille River. That same day, the 2nd Battalion of the 1st Wisconsin Cavalry under Major Henry S. Eggleston left Wittsburg with a convoy, heading south, and reached the L'Anguille Ferry near Marianna on 2 August. Eggleston's force included 130 troopers, numbers of escaped slaves, 27 wagons, and 100 seized horses and mules. At dawn, Parsons led 600 horsemen of the 12th Texas in a surprise attack on the Union camp. After a half-hour of heavy fighting, the surviving Federals scattered into the woods. The Texans inflicted losses of 17 killed, 40 wounded, and 25 captured. They made off with seven wagons and the livestock and burned everything else. Parsons reported that the 12th Texas lost two killed and 10 wounded. Later that day, La Grange rode to the rescue with 200 troopers, but the Texans were gone. At this time four cavalry regiments were dismounted because there was not enough feed for the horses. This caused a number of cavalrymen to desert. Because it had distinguished itself, the 12th Texas was allowed to remain mounted. Union soldiers began calling it the "Swamp Fox Regiment" because of its habit of traveling through swamps and attacking at night.

=== Late 1862–1865 ===
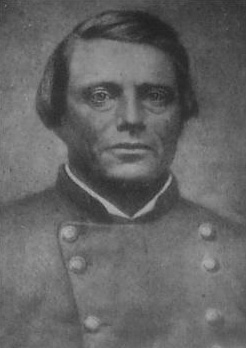
Thomas Green

In early September 1862, Parsons assumed command of an 1,110-strong cavalry brigade that included the 12th Texas and 21st Texas Cavalry Regiments, and Chrisman's battalion, according to one source. A second source stated that the brigade consisted of the 12th Texas, 21st Texas, and 19th Texas Cavalry Regiments, and Joseph H. Pratt's 10th Texas Field Battery. Parsons was replaced in command of the regiment by Lieutenant Colonel John W. Mullen, and after he resigned, by Lieutenant Colonel Andrew Bell Burleson. In 1863, the 12th Texas was transferred to northeast Louisiana to fight along with General John George Walker's Texas division, known as Walker's Greyhounds. Walker's Texas Division was about 4,000-strong. At the Battle of Goodrich's Landing on 29 June 1863, Parsons left Gaines Landing, Arkansas with the 12th Texas, 19th Texas, and 15th Louisiana Cavalry Regiments, and Cameron's Arkansas and Ralston's Mississippi Batteries. Parson's brigade surrounded a small Union-held fort and accepted the surrender of its garrison. The Confederates seized large amounts of supplies and burned the cotton that was accumulated in the warehouses. Parsons then drove off a few companies of the 1st Kansas Mounted Infantry. The next day, Union reinforcements under Alfred W. Ellet were landed and, after some skirmishing, Parsons withdrew. After the Federals successfully concluded the Siege of Vicksburg, the regiment returned to Arkansas.

The 12th Texas fought at the Battle of Blair's Landing on 12 April 1864 during the Red River Campaign. After the Union defeat at the Battle of Mansfield on 8 April, the Union fleet reversed course and began to move downstream. Thomas Green took his cavalry division to Blair's Landing to intercept the Federal gunboats and transports as they descended the river. The Confederate forces claimed to have inflicted heavy losses on Union soldiers in the transports as they passed, but Green was killed by a shot from one of the gunboats. Thomas Oliver Selfridge Jr., the commanding officer of the monitor USS Osage reported that the Confederates lined the high banks of the river and fired their rifles at the vessels as they passed within 100 yd (91 m). The Osage fired canister shot in reply, and when that was exhausted, the gun crews fired shrapnel shell with the fuses cut to one second. The battle lasted one hour and a half. Selfridge reported that everything aboard made of wood was riddled by bullets, and the armor plate of his ship's pilot house had 60 bullet marks in it, but his crew only lost seven wounded. The Confederates reported negligible losses, except for Green, and about 50 Union soldiers on the transports became casualties.

The 12th Texas continued to harass the retreating Federal troops and fought in the last action of the campaign at the Battle of Yellow Bayou on 18 May 1864. In this final action, the Federals sustained 267 casualties while the Confederates lost 452. The regiment then returned to southern Arkansas. In early 1865 it was ordered to march to Texas. On 23 May 1865 the 12th Texas Cavalry disbanded.

== See also ==
- List of Texas Civil War Confederate units
