= Black pride =

Movement encouraging black people to embrace their African heritage and culture

Black pride is a movement that encourages black people to celebrate their respective cultures and embrace their African heritage.

In the United States, it initially developed for African-American culture and was a direct response to white racism, especially during the civil rights movement. Stemming from the idea of black power, this movement emphasizes racial pride, economic empowerment, and the creation of political and cultural institutions. Related movements include black power, black nationalism, and Afrocentrism.

== Arts and music ==
=== Brazil ===
The black pride movement is very popular in Brazil, especially among poorer members of the country's population, and it is found in the Brazilian funk music genre which arose in the late 1960s, as well as in funk carioca, which emerged in the late 1980s. The origin of Brazilian funk and the origin of funk carioca both reflect Brazilian black resistance. Ethnomusicologist George Yúdice states that youths who embraced a black culture which was being mediated by a U.S. culture industry were met with many arguments against their susceptibility to cultural colonization. Although it borrows some ingredients from hip hop, its style still remains unique to Brazil (mainly Rio de Janeiro and São Paulo).

=== United States ===
Black pride is a major theme in some works by African American popular musicians. Civil Rights Movement era songs such as The Impressions's hit songs "We're a Winner" and "Keep on Pushing" and James Brown's "Say It Loud – I'm Black and I'm Proud" celebrated black pride. Beyoncé's half-time performance at Super Bowl 50, which included homages to Malcolm X and the Black Panthers, has been described by the media as a display of black pride.

Dating back to the 1960s, there was a push for people of color to be heard. Artists, like James Brown, won over the respect of the United States through their art and music. Creating movements like "Black is Beautiful," a movement where the features of black women were highlighted in picture form, allowed black people to emphasize their beauty and further emphasize the idea of Black Pride.

== Beauty and fashion ==
=== Jamaica ===
Black pride has been a central theme of the originally Jamaican Rastafari movement since the second half of the 20th century. It has been described as "a rock in the face of expressions of white superiority," being promoted by national figures like Marcus Garvey as self-empowering. Dreadlocks became prominent and, according to Jesuit priest Joseph Owens, represented "refusal to depart from the ancient, natural way". However, American author and activist Alice Walker claims conservatives saw the movement's style as "not just disgusting, but down-right frightening".

=== United States ===
Beauty standards are a major theme of black pride. Black pride was represented in slogans such as "black is beautiful" which challenged white beauty standards. Prior to the black pride movement, the majority of black people straightened their hair or wore wigs. The return to natural hair styles such as the afro, cornrows, and dreadlocks were seen as expressions of black pride.

In the 1960s to 1970s, kente cloth and the Black Panthers uniform were worn in the U.S. as expressions of black pride. Headscarves were sometimes worn by Nation of Islam and other Black Muslim Movement members as an expression of black pride and a symbol of faith. Other women used scarves with African prints to cover their hair.

Maxine Leeds Craig argues that all-black beauty pageants such as Miss Black America were institutionalized forms of black pride created in response to exclusion from white beauty pageants.

== See also ==
- Afrocentrism
- Black Arts Movement
- Black Consciousness Movement – South African anti-apartheid movement, 1960s
- Black genocide – Framework for analyzing racism against African Americans
- Double consciousness – Concept in social philosophy
- White pride – Racist expression
