= 23rd Texas Cavalry Regiment =

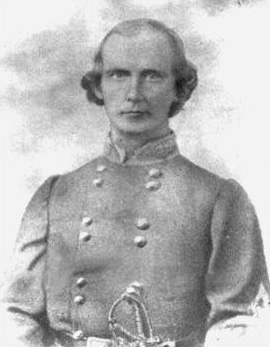
- The regiment was assigned to Hamilton P. Bee's cavalry brigade.
- Active: Spring 1862 – June 1865
- Country: Confederate States of America
- Allegiance: Confederate States of America, Texas
- Branch: Confederate States Army
- Type: Cavalry
- Size: Regiment
- Engagements: American Civil War; Battle of Mansfield (1864); Battle of Pleasant Hill (1864); Battle of Blair's Landing (1864)

Commanders
- Notable commanders: Nicholas C. Gould

The 23rd Texas Cavalry Regiment, was a unit of mounted volunteers from Texas that fought in the Confederate States Army during the American Civil War. The unit first organized in spring 1862, but did not complete its 10-company organization until October 1862. Before being added to the regiment, one company was captured at Fort Donelson and was part of a prisoner exchange. The regiment became part of a brigade led by Hamilton Bee that was headquartered at Brownsville, Texas, and guarded the Texas Gulf Coast. In 1864, the brigade transferred to Louisiana and fought at Mansfield, Pleasant Hill, and Blair's Landing in the Red River Campaign. The regiment was dismounted to serve as infantry in February 1865 and surrendered to Federal forces in May 1865.

== See also ==
- List of Texas Civil War Confederate units
