= Goodrich's Landing, Louisiana =

Extinct settlement in eastern Carroll Parish

Coordinates: 32.7432°N 91.1791°W

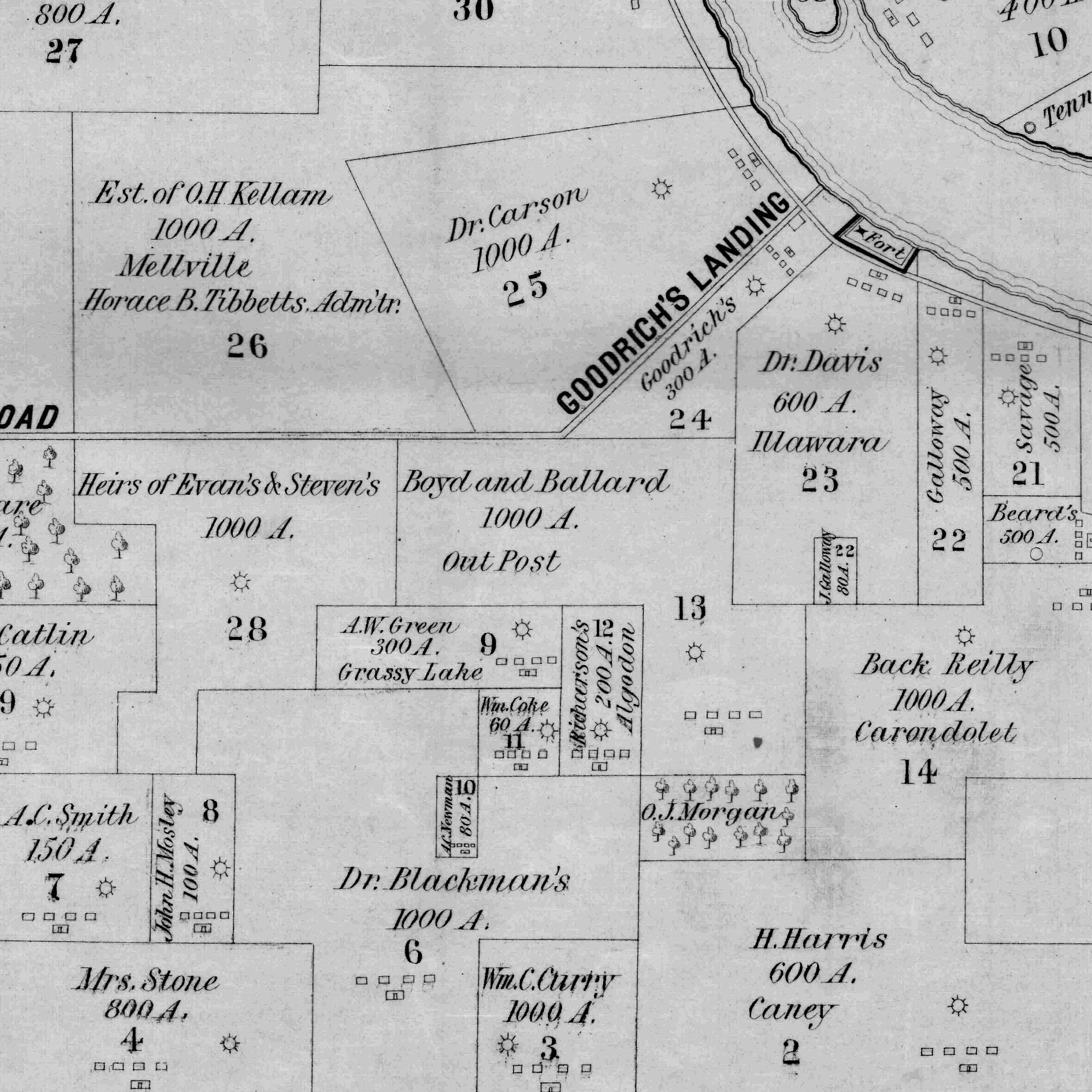
Plantations of Carroll Parish mapped after the American Civil War, showing location of Goodrich's Landing and Monticello Road

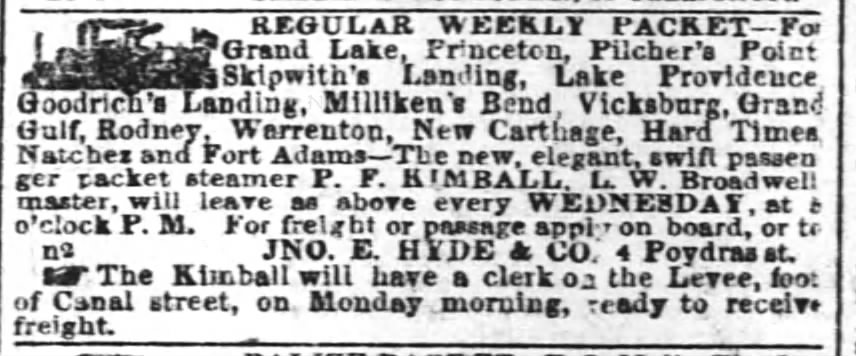
Goodrich's Landing had regular packet boat service by the mid-1850s

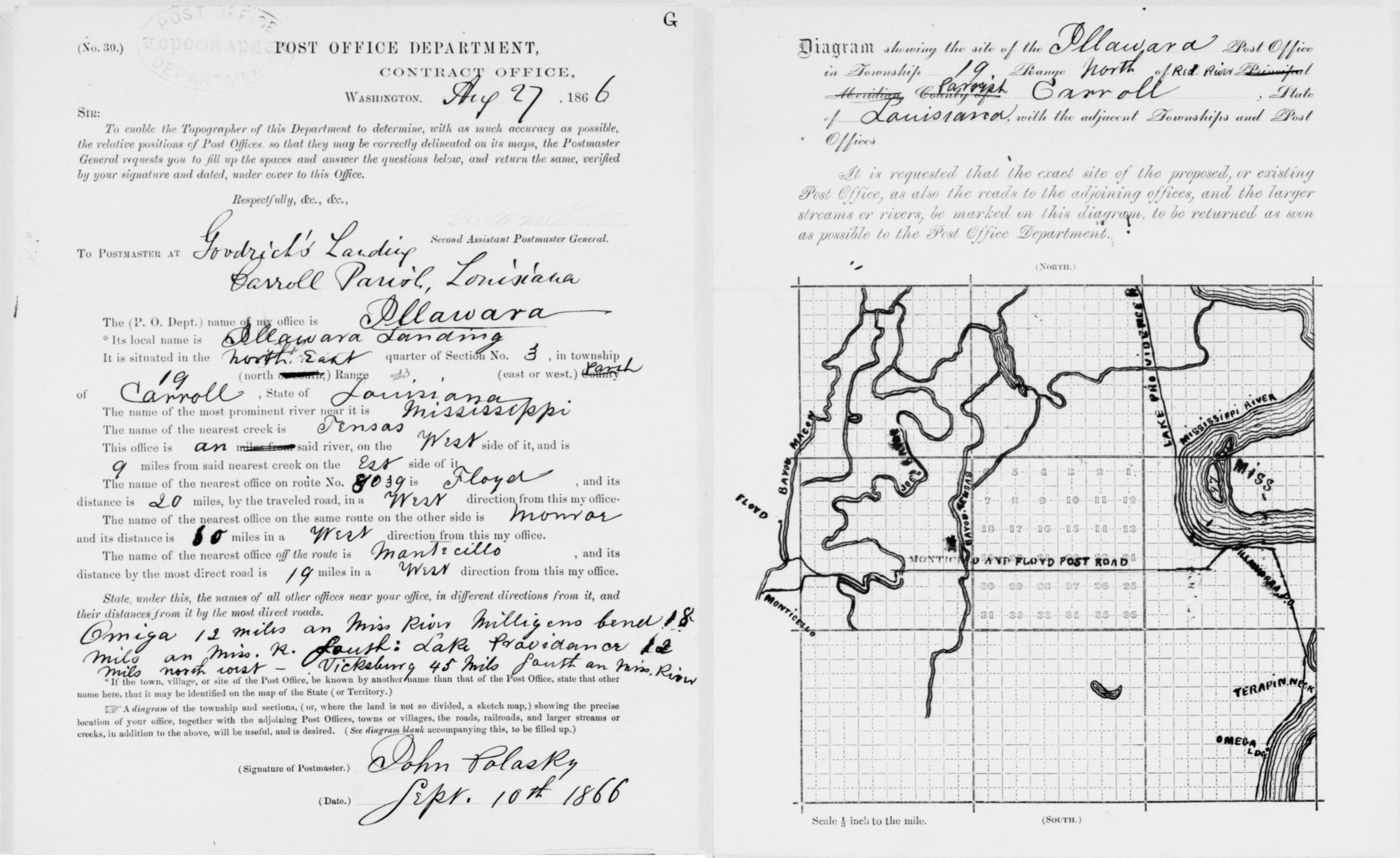
Map of Illawara post office at Goodrich's Landing, 1866

Goodrich's Landing, earlier known as Pecan Grove and later known as Illawara, was a placename connected to a steamboat landing and plantation in Carroll Parish, Louisiana, United States. (Carroll Parish was divided into West Carroll Parish and East Carroll Parish in 1877.) Goodrich's Landing was the site of the American Civil War battle of Goodrich's Landing in 1863.

== History ==
The area was alternately known as Pecan Grove after a plantation there. The plantation was established in 1825. There was a school at Pecan Grove as early as 1837. Henry Goodrich owned Pecan Grove plantation beginning sometime before 1847. Pecan Grove had a main residence, a cotton gin, and slave quarters. Pecan Grove was used as a site for political meetings and had a Masonic lodge.

The name Goodrich's Landing was in use by 1850. The steamboat Daniel Boone sank at Goodrich's Landing in December 1859. The location was the site of the Battle of Goodrich's Landing in 1863. Once the U.S. Army had full control of the Mississippi, "Goodrich was turned over to the blacks again and a northern Freedmen's Aid Commission sent a young woman down from Chicago to teach the new citizens to read and write. She set up a school under the trees and began to initiate about 50 small children into the mysteries of the alphabet and the printed word. After a short time, she went back to Chicago, and the school was closed." In 1864, after the lands in the vicinity of the Greenville Bends were no longer Confederate strongholds (although not yet wholly restored to the Union), a report on the "future supply of cotton" urged readers interested in the economy of the South to "Take, then, Sancho Lynch, at Goodrich's Landing, 'A right smart handy nigger-boy' to use the terms of two years ago; hiring his associates, he produced 75 bales of cotton, valued at $18,000. One slave-owner would have required an invested capital of $15,000 to accomplish what this man less than two years old in freedom has accomplished with no other capital than his own ability; and yet this man could not be trusted to take care of himself!"

Four deaths from the yellow fever epidemic were reported at Goodrich's Landing in September 1878. It was the site of a family cemetery that was eroding into the Mississippi River as of 1883. Levees were being built and repaired by convict labor at Pecan Grove, Goodrich's Landing, and nearby Illawara in 1891. There was a Pecan Grove Methodist Church at Goodrich's Landing. The one-room Pecan Grove schoolhouse at Goodrich's Landing persisted until at least the 1890s.

According to a history of Carroll Parish prepared for the 1976 bicentennial of the United States, "due to the changing course of the Mississippi River, the Pecan Grove site is now located north of Henderson Island in the state of Mississippi."

== See also ==
- Skipwith's Landing
- Columbia, Arkansas
- Lake Providence, Louisiana
- Mississippi River in the American Civil War
