= 3rd Louisiana Cavalry Regiment =

3rd Louisiana Cavalry Regiment (Harrison's) 15th Louisiana Cavalry Battalion
- Active: January 1863 – 26 May 1865
- Country: Confederate States of America
- Allegiance: Louisiana
- Branch: Confederate States Army
- Type: Cavalry
- Size: Battalion; Regiment
- Engagements: American Civil War; Battle of Choctaw Bayou (1863); Battle of Milliken's Bend (1863); Red River campaign (1864)

Commanders
- Notable commanders: Isaac F. Harrison

The 3rd Louisiana Cavalry Regiment was a unit of mounted volunteers recruited in Louisiana that fought in the Confederate States Army during the American Civil War. Originally formed as the 15th Louisiana Cavalry Battalion, the unit was upgraded to a regiment in November 1863 and led by Colonel Isaac F. Harrison.

== History ==
The 15th Louisiana Cavalry Battalion was organized in January 1863 at Monroe, Louisiana. At Choctaw Bayou and other places, the battalion tried but failed to stop the army of Major General Ulysses S. Grant from moving down the Mississippi River in April 1863. Elements of the battalion fought at Milliken's Bend and raided Union camps in June 1863.

The battalion was augmented by three additional companies in November 1863 to form a regiment, and redesignated as the 3rd Louisiana Cavalry. The regiment is often denoted as the 3rd Louisiana (Harrison's) to distinguish it from another Louisiana regiment with the same number led by Colonel J. Frank Pargoud. The regiment served for the entire war west of the Mississippi River in the Trans-Mississippi Department.

The 3rd Louisiana fought in the Red River campaign in spring 1864 and resisted minor Union raids in the Alexandria and Monroe areas before formally surrendering on 26 May 1865.

== Commanders ==
Commanding officers of the 3rd Louisiana Cavalry:

- Col. Isaac F. Harrison
- Lt. Col. Francis W. Moore
- Lt. Col. William R. Purvis

== Organization ==
Companies of the 3rd Louisiana Cavalry:

- Company A, "Tensas Cavalry" of Tensas Parish.
- Company B, of Madison Parish.
- Company C, "Faulkner's Defenders/Caldwell Defenders" of Caldwell Parish.
- Company D, of Catahoula Parish.
- Company E, of Catahoula Parish.
- Company F, of Morehouse Parish.
- Company G, "Red River Rangers" of Caddo Parish.
- Company H, of Jackson Parish.
- Company I, "Lovell Scouts" of St. Mary Parish.
- Company K, "Prairie Rangers" of St. Landry Parish.
