= Joseph Owens (footballer) =

Welsh footballer

Personal information
- Full name: Joseph Owens
- Date of birth: 1878
- Place of birth: Wrexham, Wales
- Position: Forward

Senior career*
Years	Team	Apps	(Gls)
1896-1898	Rhos Eagle Wanderers		
1899-1908	Wrexham		
1908-1911	Rhos Eagle Wanderers		

International career
1902	Wales	1	(0)
- * Club domestic league appearances and goals

Joseph Owens (born 1878) was a Welsh footballer who played as a forward for Rhosllanerchrugog, Wrexham and Wales.

== International appearances ==
Date	Venue	Opponent	Score	Goals	Competition
15 March 1902	Cappielow Park, Greenock	Scotland	1-5	0	
