= Frances Titus =

US abolitionist and suffragist

Frances W. Titus
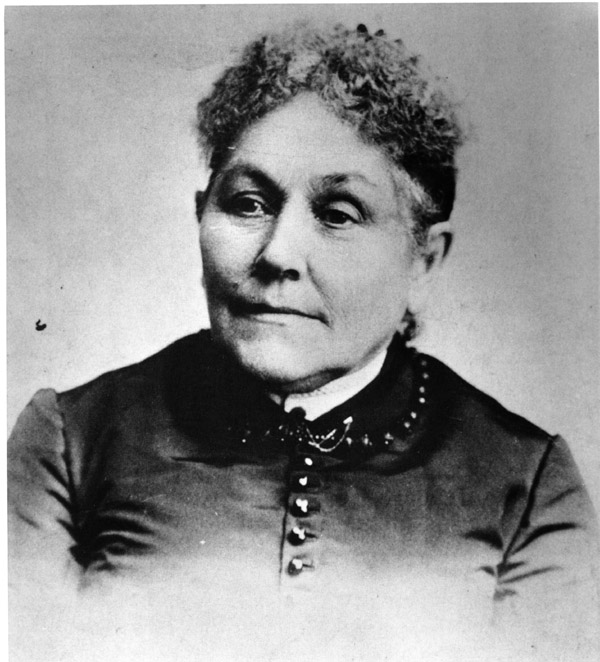
- Born: 1816; Charlotte, Vermont
- Died: April 19, 1894 (aged 77–78); Battle Creek, Michigan
- Occupations: Abolitionist and Suffragist
- Known for: Secretary of Sojourner Truth as well as a founder of a school for freed slave men

Frances W. Titus (1816-1894) was an American abolitionist and suffragist who is best known for being the confidante, secretary, tour director, financial manager, and editor of Sojourner Truth's biography, Narrative of Sojourner Truth. She led important reform movements as the founder of a school for freed slave men and also played a major role in local and state suffrage movements.

== Personal life ==
Frances Walling was born in 1816 in Charlotte, Vermont and she spent most of her childhood and teenage years in Cleveland, Ohio. Titus was brought up in a Quaker household.

In October 1844, she married Captain Richard F. Titus, a Quaker and a native of New Rochelle, New York, becoming Francis Walling Titus. Captain Titus became a sea captain at eighteen years of age. Upon her marriage, the couple built a new home on Maple Street. She had two sons; Richard Jr., who died at the age of three, and Samuel John who was born on January 16, 1846. After the family moved to Battle Creek, Michigan, her husband became a flour miller. The couple joined the Swedenborgian Church in Battle Creek. Titus was also interested in freethought and spiritualism.

Richard F. Titus died in 1868. Titus died on April 19, 1894, in Battle Creek, Michigan.

== Activism ==
Titus worked with the women of the Suffrage Movement. She initially met with Sojourner Truth in 1856 among Progressive Friends. She worked with Josephine Griffing of the Freedman's Bureau in Washington DC in December 1866 to help eight freed slave men start new lives in finding jobs and housing. Titus worked with Sojourner Truth in Rochester, New York to have freedmen resettle in that area. However, as the freedmen preferred to live in Battle Creek, Michigan, eight men were transported there that December for Titus to help them become established. Titus founded a school in 1867 to teach adult African Americans to read, write and to do basic arithmetic problems. Staffed by volunteers, it operated twice a week out of city hall. She entertained the strident abolitionist Parker Pillsbury when he visited the city.

Titus focused on the Suffrage Movement in Michigan and kept in contact with Truth, who worked the lecture circuit. Titus played a major role in being one of the founders of the Michigan Suffrage Association. She served on the executive committees of the state and national suffrage organizations.

In September through December 1879, Titus and Truth traveled to Kansas to assist thousands of poor and hungry African Americans who left the South and its racial oppression to settle in Kansas. Aided by Laura Smith Haviland and the English-American Elizabeth Comstock, the women worked with the Kansas Freedmen's Relief Association to help the immigrants adapt to life in Kansas and become established.

== Narrative of Sojourner Truth ==
Titus helped Truth write her narrative Narrative of Sojourner Truth, which was published in 1875. In the edition that Titus worked on, she restated Lincoln's statement about his intention in enacting the Emancipation Proclamation. Rather than stating that because the Southerners had not "behaved themselves", Lincoln felt he "was compelled to do these things," the revised edition stated that the South's behavior gave him "the opportunity to do these things." This version more firmly portrays Lincoln as the "Great Emancipator". Titus also wrote updates to the 1878 and 1884 versions, using newspaper clippings, letters, and other documents that Truth had collected. She edited the book to place Truth in a more favorable light and removed some information about Truth's birth and speculated that she was 20 years older than originally thought, which helped fuel legends about her age. Among the inaccuracies that she inserted, she also removed information about when she was freed.

== Bibliography ==
- Mabee, Carleton; Newhouse, Susan Mabee (1995). Sojourner Truth: Slave, Prophet, Legend. NYU Press. ISBN 978-0-8147-5525-9.
