= Maxine Leeds Craig =

American academic

Maxine Leeds Craig is an American professor, working in the sociology department at the University of California, Davis.

Craig was a doctoral student of Todd Gitlin at the University of California, Berkeley; her doctoral dissertation became the book, Ain't I a Beauty Queen? Black Women, Beauty, and the Politics of Race (2002). Her second book, Sorry I Don't Dance: Why Men Refuse to Move (2013), was awarded the 2014 Best Publication Award of the American Sociological Association's section on Body and Embodiment.

She was chair of the American Sociological Association Section on Race, Gender, and Class for 2009–2010.

== Publications ==
- Ain't I A Beauty Queen?: Black Women, Beauty, and the Politics of Race. Oxford University Press, 2002. ISBN 978-0195152623.
- Sorry I Don't Dance: Why Men Refuse To Move. Oxford University Press, 2013. ISBN 978-0199845293.
