= 19th Texas Cavalry Regiment =

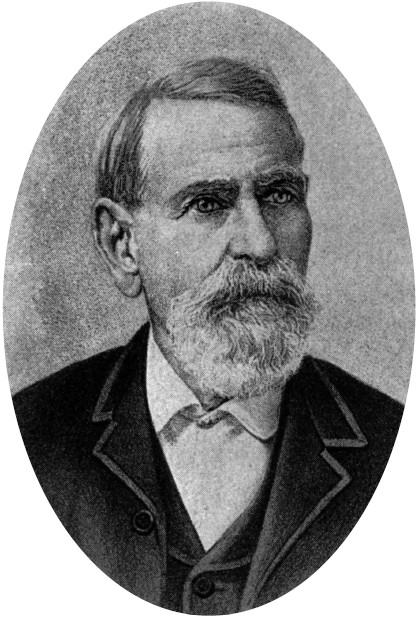
- Nathaniel M. Burford was the regiment's commander.
- Active: 31 March 1862 – 23 May 1865
- Country: Confederate States of America
- Allegiance: Confederate States of America, Texas
- Branch: Confederate States Army
- Type: Cavalry
- Size: Regiment
- Engagements: American Civil War; Battle of Cape Girardeau (1863); Battle of Yellow Bayou (1864)

Commanders
- Notable commanders: Nathaniel Macon Burford

The 19th Texas Cavalry Regiment was a unit of mounted volunteers from Texas that fought in the Confederate States Army during the American Civil War. The regiment mustered into Confederate service at the end of March 1862. It moved to Arkansas in fall 1862 and managed to avoid being dismounted as infantry, instead serving in William Parsons' cavalry brigade. The regiment fought at Cape Girardeau in 1863. The unit operated against Union supply lines and skirmished with Union forces in Arkansas and Louisiana. It arrived too late to take part in the main battles of the Red River campaign of 1864, but fought at Yellow Bayou. In 1865, the unit moved to Texas where it disbanded in May 1865.

== See also ==
- List of Texas Civil War Confederate units
