= 4th Louisiana Field Battery =

- Active: August 1862 – 2 June 1865
- Country: Confederate States of America
- Allegiance: Confederate States of America; Louisiana
- Branch: Confederate States Army
- Type: Artillery
- Size: Company
- Equipment: 4 guns
- Engagements: American Civil War; Red River campaign (1864); Destruction of Clara Bell (1864); Action at Sunnyside Landing (1864)

Commanders
- Notable commanders: Archibald J. Cameron

The 4th Louisiana Field Battery was an artillery unit recruited from volunteers in Louisiana and Mississippi that fought in the Confederate States Army during the American Civil War. The 4-gun battery organized in August 1862 with recruits from Tensas Parish, Louisiana, and Jefferson County, Mississippi. The unit usually accompanied Isaac F. Harrison's 3rd Louisiana Cavalry Regiment and fought in several skirmishes in April 1863. The battery fought in the Red River campaign in 1864 but saw little action. On 24 July 1864, the battery helped destroy the Union river transport Clara Bell at Ashton Landing. On 27 July, it damaged two Union transports at Sunnyside Landing in Arkansas. The unit traveled to Marshall, Texas, in early 1865 to refit and was there when the war ended.

== See also ==
- List of Louisiana Confederate Civil War units
- Louisiana in the Civil War
