= William Henry Parsons (colonel) =

American journalist and politician

William Henry Parsons (April 23, 1826 – October 3, 1907) was an American newspaper editor and legislator who served as a Confederate States Army colonel during the American Civil War. He was the brother of Albert Parsons, a pioneer American socialist/anarchist and newspaper editor who also served in the Confederate Army, and the brother-in-law of Lucy Parsons, American labor organizer and socialist/communist.

== Biography ==
Although born in New Jersey, Parsons grew up in Montgomery, Alabama. He attended Emory College in Oxford, Georgia, but he left college to fight in Mexico under Zachary Taylor. Parsons later worked in the newspaper business in Texas. When the Civil War began, he received a commission as a colonel from Governor Edward Clark. His 4th Texas Dragoons became the 12th Texas Cavalry Regiment when the unit was mustered into the Confederate States Army on October 28, 1861. Parsons helped defend Little Rock, Arkansas, against a Union army led by Brigadier General Samuel Curtis and Louisiana from Major General Nathaniel Banks. He was recommended for the rank of brigadier general several times.

After the war, he left Texas to investigate the possibility of establishing a Confederate colony in British Honduras. He returned to be elected to the Texas State Senate. In 1871, President Grant appointed him a centennial commissioner, and he moved to New York.

In 1907, he died at the home of his son in Chicago and was buried in Mount Hope Cemetery, Hastings-on-Hudson, New York.

== See also ==
- Battle of Cotton Plant
- Battle of Goodrich's Landing
- Albert Parsons
