= Joseph Owens (Jesuit) =

American Jesuit

Joseph Owens SJ is a Roman Catholic priest, social worker, and educator who has worked for many years in the Caribbean and Central America. He is the author of Dread, The Rastafarians of Jamaica (1974), written from 1970 to 1972 while working and living with members of the Rastafari movement in Kingston, Jamaica, during which period he discussed theological and philosophical issues with them in order to write a book examining their beliefs in relation to Judaism, Christianity and the Bible. In the book he attempts to allow the Rasta to explain their doctrines in their own words, examining all key doctrines in different chapters. The book is a rich and unique source of material about Rastafarian beliefs in the developmental stage of the religion.

Owens studied philosophy at Boston College, United States and divinity at Weston College School of Theology, Cambridge, Massachusetts Owens has worked for many years in the Jesuit colleges of Central America in Managua, Nicaragua. In recent years he has done numerous translations. He is the translator of the recently published work The Gospel of Faith and Justice by Antonio Gonzalez as well as the 2013 book by Pope Francis, Open Mind, Faithful Heart.

In 2019, Owens was listed on a list of Jesuits credibly accused of sexual abuse of minors. According to the document, Owens admitted to this abuse, which allegedly took place in the 1970s and 1980s. After a report in 1992, Owens' ministry was restricted in 1993. He continued work in Honduras, including with the organization Fe y Alegría. His ministry was then impeded in 2002, although he continued work in Honduras at UCA until 2006.

== Published works ==
- "Literature on the Rastafari, 1955-1974", Savacou 11-12 (1975):86-115. (Republished in New Community 6:1/2, 1977/78.)
- Dread, The Rastafarians of Jamaica (1974). ISBN 0-435-98650-3
- The Gospel of Faith and Justice (2005), auth. Antonio Gonzalez, transl. Joseph Owens. ISBN 978-1-57075-611-5
- Open Mind, Faithful Heart: Reflections on Following Jesus (2013), auth. Pope Francis, transl. Joseph Owens. ISBN 9789996599057
