= 5th United States Colored Heavy Artillery Regiment =

Union Army unit of the American Civil War

Coordinates: 32.44°N 91.10°W

9th Regiment, Louisiana Infantry (African Descent) 1st Regiment, Mississippi Colored Heavy Artillery 5th Regiment, U.S. Colored Heavy Artillery
- Active: May 1, 1863 – May 20, 1866
- Country: United States of America
- Allegiance: Union
- Branch: Union Army
- Type: Infantry; Heavy Artillery
- Size: Regiment
- Engagements: American Civil War: Vicksburg Campaign; Siege of Vicksburg; Battle of Milliken's Bend; Battle of Young's Point; Expedition to Rodney and Fayette; Yazoo City Expedition

Commanders
- Notable commanders: Col. Hermann Lieb

The 9th Louisiana Infantry (African Descent), later reorganized as 1st Mississippi Colored Heavy Artillery and then renamed 5th U.S. Colored Heavy Artillery, was an African-American regiment in the Union Army during the American Civil War. It famously fought in the Battle of Milliken's Bend; one of the earliest Civil War battles with African-American troops involved.

== Original regimental organization and service ==
The creation of the regiment was authorized by Adjutant General Lorenzo Thomas, who had gone west to recruit colored troops, on April 14, 1863; and it was organized on May 1 at Vicksburg, Mississippi. Because of the irregular practice to establish all 10 companies at once and to divide new recruits equally among them, none of the companies had the needed strength to be mustered according to the regulations. The 9th had an all-white officer corps that, with the exception of the regimental command staff, was entirely composed of former enlisted volunteer soldiers.

The original regimental command and staff officers were:

- Colonel: Hermann Lieb (Major, 8th Illinois Infantry)
- Lieutenant Colonel: Charles L. Page (Captain, 20th Illinois Infantry)
- Major: Erastus N. Owen (1st Lt., 20th Ohio Infantry)
- Adjutant: 1st Lt. Russell B. Neal (2nd Lt., 20th Ohio Infantry)
- Quartermaster: 1st Lt. Charles M. Clark (Quartermaster Sergeant, 8th Illinois Infantry)

While participating in the Vicksburg Campaign Colonel Lieb, in overall command, led his 285 men into the Battle of Milliken's Bend. In the close-combat battle the regiment lost some 62 killed and 130 wounded, the number of missing men not being given. Its 67% total losses makes it among the highest of any unit during the Civil War. On the same day the unit fought in the follow-up Battle of Young's Point. Afterwards the companies were restructured and finally, on August 7, 1863, the regiment was formally mustered into Federal service.

== Jack Jackson ==
One early recruit to join the regiment was named Jack Jackson. Jackson was said to be very large and strong-willed and quickly became a Sergeant in Company B. At some point Jackson joined the regimental recruiting parties; the officers were having trouble with convincing local field hands to join. Jackson's recruiting method was described as very forceful but ultimately successful. At the Battle of Milliken's Bend one of Jackson's superior officers, Lieutenant David Cornwell, described the attack; saying that the 23rd Iowa was not behaving courageously but the three black infantry regiments offered great resistance. He said that Jackson, "Laid into a group of Texans... smashing in every head he could reach", and that, "Big Jack Jackson passed me like a rocket. With the fury of a tiger he sprang into that gang and crushed everything before him. There was nothing left of Jack's gun except the barrel and he was smashing everything he could reach. On the other side of the levee, they were yelling 'Shoot that big [soldier]!' while Jack was daring the whole gang to come up and fight him. Then a bullet reached his head and he fell full on the levee."

== Later reorganizations ==
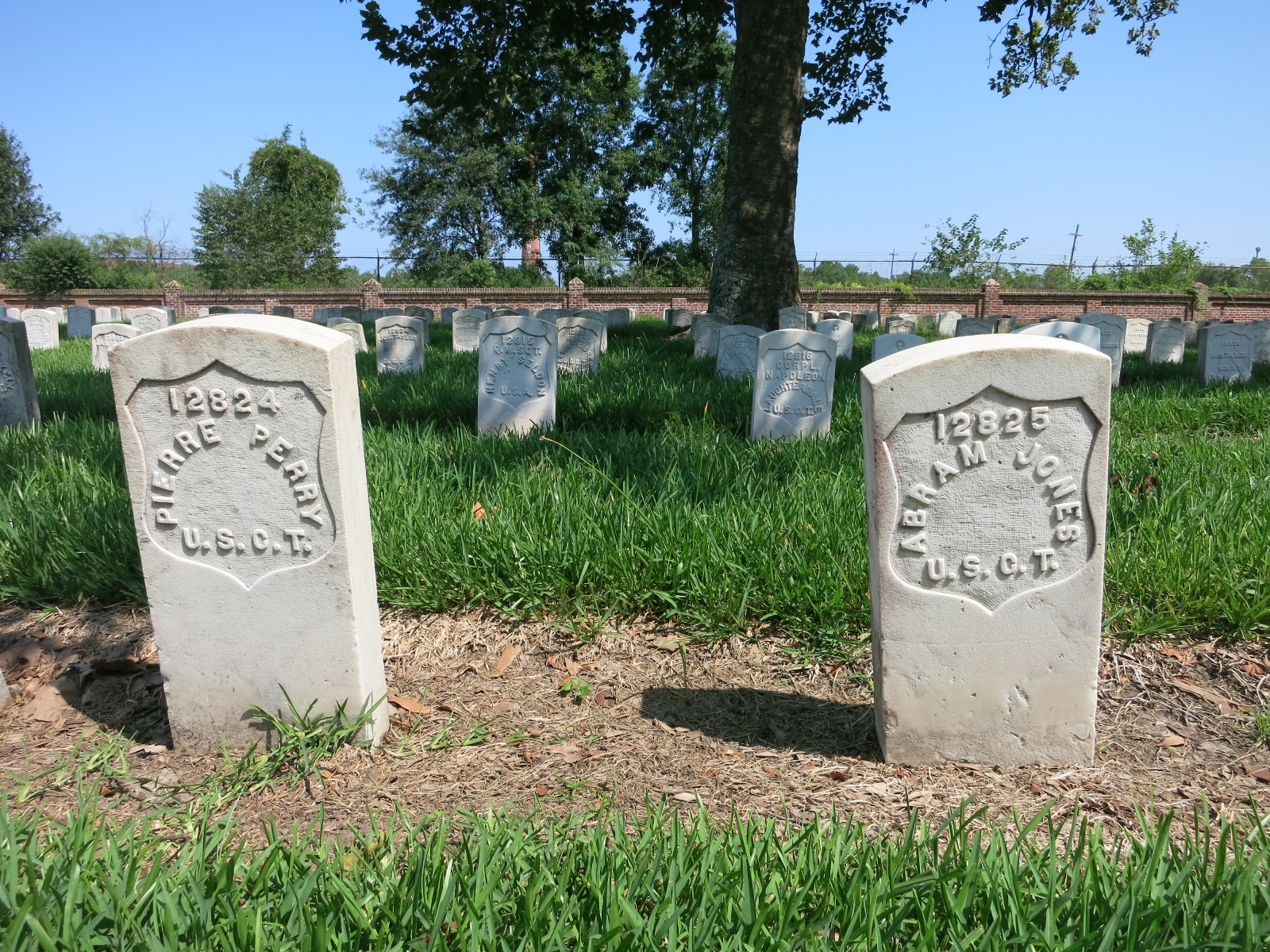
Two graves of US Colored Troops (USCT) at Chalmette National Cemetery in New Orleans, La.

In September 1863, still at Vicksburg, the regiment began a reorganization process owed to the formal establishment and enlargement of the United States Colored Troops. On September 26 it was converted into an artillery unit, becoming the 1st Regiment, Mississippi Heavy Artillery (African Descent). Still commanded by Colonel Lieb, it was designated 4th U.S. Colored Heavy Artillery in March 1864 before finally becoming the 5th U.S. Colored Heavy Artillery a month later. Under that designation it participated in the Expedition to Rodney and Fayette and the Yazoo City Expedition.

The 5th was mustered out on May 20, 1866. Its losses were given as 4 officers and 124 enlisted men killed and mortally wounded; 4 officers and 697 enlisted men dead by disease for a total of 829.

Meanwhile, when the regiment received the Mississippi designation a new 9th Louisiana Infantry (African Descent) was formed. Like the old 9th, it was renamed with the formalization of the USCT; it became the 63rd U.S. Colored Infantry Regiment on March 11, 1864. That unit, commanded by Colonel John Eaton, served in Mississippi, Louisiana, Arkansas, and Tennessee, and was mustered out on January 9, 1866.

== See also ==
- List of Mississippi Union Civil War units
- List of Louisiana Union Civil War units
- List of United States Colored Troops Civil War units
