= 64th United States Colored Infantry Regiment =

- Active: 1864–1866
- Country: United States
- Allegiance: United States Union
- Branch: Infantry; United States Colored Troops
- Size: Regiment
- Engagements: American Civil War

Commanders
- Notable commanders: Samuel Russell Thomas

The 64th Regiment United States Colored Troops, was a regiment of African-American troops recruited from Louisiana that served in the Union Army during the American Civil War. The 64th Regiment was organized from the 7th Louisiana Infantry (African Descent) in March, 1864, and served as a garrison force along the Mississippi River until March, 1866.

== Organization ==
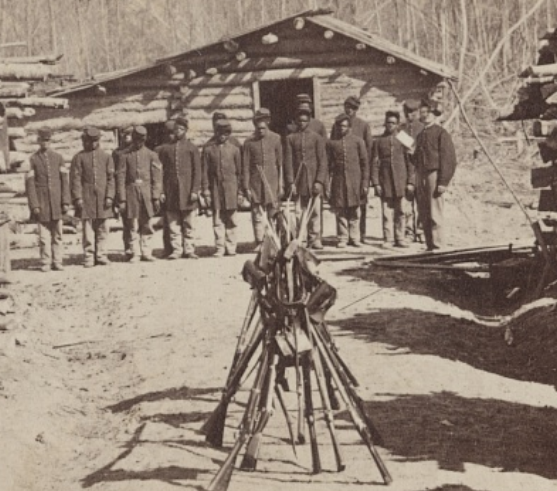
Troops of the 64th Colored Infantry in camp at Palmyra Bend, Mississippi.

The predecessor unit of the 64th Infantry, the 7th Louisiana Colored Infantry Regiment, was organized in New Orleans in the summer of 1863 from freed or escaped slaves recruited from Louisiana plantations. Units of Black soldiers were assigned to garrison duties to hold strategic points along the Mississippi River and free up veteran Union regiments for service elsewhere. General Henry Halleck wrote to Ulysses S. Grant in July 1863 expressing his opinion that the regiments of freshly-recruited Black troops would be suitable for this assignment: “The Mississippi should be the base of future operations east and west. When Port Hudson falls, the fortifications of that place, as well as of Vicksburg, should be so arranged as to be held by the smallest possible garrisons, thus leaving the mass of troops for operations in the field. I suggest that colored troops be used as far as possible in the garrisons." On March 11, 1864, the name of the regiment was changed to the 64th Infantry Regiment, United States Colored Troops.

== Service ==
The companies of the 64th Colored Infantry were assigned to guard various posts along the Mississippi river, including Helena, Arkansas, Davis Bend, Mississippi, Natchez, Mississippi, and Vicksburg, Mississippi.

Recruiting standards for Black regiments raised in Louisiana and Mississippi were low, with many men impressed from the freed slave population and forced into the army. An inspection report from July 1864 detailed that the 63rd & 64th regiments contained "many useless soldiers, old, crippled, sick, and unserviceable poor condition". The inspecting officer reported that the stated intention of the commanding officers had been to form an "invalid corps" of Black soldiers not fit for regular service, similar to the Veteran Reserve Corps for white soldiers, but this effort had been marred by officers who used the 63rd & 64th regiments as a dumping ground for poor-quality soldiers from their regiments: "The officers report that they have new many men who are unfit for service. If the above idea is carried out no real service need by expected from the organization...The detachments are in bad condition and indifferently officered." Unlike the white Veteran Reserve Corps, some of the men of the 63rd and 64th Colored regiments were in such poor condition that they had been rejected by medical examiners, but were enrolled in the regiment anyway.

Despite this condemnation, the 64th Colored Infantry did see combat on various occasions, skirmishing with Confederate troops at various points along the Mississippi River. John Eaton, the commander of the 63rd regiment which served alongside the 64th in the so-called "invalid corps", defended the service of these regiments. Rather than heroic combat, the 63rd and 64th performed the "humbler duty" of protecting freed slaves: "safeguarding the plantations from assaults which were often vindicative and particularly cruel, the task of protected the women and children, the aged and infirm, these were services which devolved upon men debarred by physical incapacity by their brothers."

The regiment fought small actions at Helena, Arkansas, Point Pleasant, Louisiana, Pine Bluff, Arkansas, and Ashwood's Landing, Louisiana. Casualties of the regiment included 5 killed and 2 wounded at Ashwood's Landing, 1 killed at Point Pleasant, 6 killed at Pine Bluff, 2 wounded at Davis Bend, and 1 wounded at Helena.

In November 1864, the regiment along with its commanding officer Colonel Samuel Thomas was tasked with supervising the settlement of freed slaves at Davis' Bend, Mississippi, where the relatives of Confederate President Jefferson Davis once held massive plantations worked by enslaved people.

The regiment was mustered out of service on March 13, 1866.

== Commanders ==
Commanding officers of the 64th USCT Infantry:

- Colonel Samuel R. Thomas, promoted to brevet brigadier general, March 13, 1865.
- Lieutenant Colonel Robert S. Donaldson
- Lieutenant Colonel John Phillips, resigned July 1864.

== See also ==
- List of United States Colored Troops Civil War units
