= United States Army enlisted rank insignia 1851–1901 =

On June 12, 1851, the United States Army issued new uniform regulations. The new regulations set out a system of chevrons to show enlisted rank.

Chevrons had been used to show rank in the 1820s and sergeants and corporals of dragoons had worn them to show rank since 1833. A system of chevrons was devised in 1847 to show rank on fatigue jackets of all branches that were being worn during the Mexican-American War. Chevrons were also used from 1832 to 1851 to show length of service.

The 1851 regulations ended the system of different colored buttons and trim to denote branch used since 1780. Now each branch would have a colored cloth trim. The colors were light blue for infantry, red for artillery, green for mounted riflemen, orange for dragoons, crimson for ordnancemen and yellow for engineers.

The chevron system would carry on from the 1847 system with sergeants major wearing three chevrons and three arcs, quartermaster sergeants three chevrons and three ties, first sergeants threes chevrons and a lozenge, sergeants three chevrons and corporals two chevrons, with the addition of ordnance sergeants wearing three chevrons and a star. The 1847 chevrons pointed up but the 1851 chevrons pointed down. Length of service was now shown by hashmarks worn on the lower sleeve.

== US Army Chevrons 1851-1854 ==
Center!	Sergeant Major	Quartermaster Sergeant	Principal or Chief Musician	Chief Bugler	Ordnance Sergeant	First Sergeant	Sergeant	Corporal	Bugler	Musician	Farrier and Blacksmith	Artificer	Private First Class	Private Second Class	Private	Enlisted Man of Ordnance
Corps of Engineers										No Insignia		No Insignia	No Insignia	No Insignia		
Ordnance Department																No Insignia
Dragoons			No Insignia	No Insignia					No Insignia		No Insignia				No Insignia	
Mounted Riflemen			No Insignia	No Insignia					No Insignia		No Insignia				No Insignia	
Artillery			No Insignia							No Insignia		No Insignia			No Insignia	
Infantry			No Insignia							No Insignia					No Insignia	

On March 3, 1855, two regiments of cavalry were added to the army. Yellow chevrons were used.

== US Army Chevrons 1855 ==
	Sergeant Major	Quartermaster Sergeant	Principal or Chief Musician	Chief Bugler	Ordnance Sergeant	First Sergeant	Sergeant	Corporal	Bugler	Musician	Farrier and Blacksmith	Artificer	Private First Class	Private Second Class	Private	Enlisted Man of Ordnance
Corps of Engineers										No Insignia		No Insignia	No Insignia	No Insignia		
Ordnance Department																No Insignia
Cavalry			No Insignia	No Insignia					No Insignia		No Insignia				No Insignia	
Dragoons			No Insignia	No Insignia					No Insignia		No Insignia				No Insignia	
Mounted Riflemen			No Insignia	No Insignia					No Insignia		No Insignia				No Insignia	
Artillery			No Insignia							No Insignia		No Insignia			No Insignia	
Infantry			No Insignia							No Insignia					No Insignia	

On August 16, 1856, enlisted hospital stewards were added to the Medical Department. Insignia had been prescribed on October 31, 1851. Instead of chevrons a green hashmark with a yellow caduceus was used.

== US Army Chevrons 1856-1860 ==
Center!	Sergeant Major	Quartermaster Sergeant	Principal or Chief Musician	Chief Bugler	Hospital Steward	Ordnance Sergeant	First Sergeant	Sergeant	Corporal	Bugler	Musician	Farrier and Blacksmith	Artificer	Private First Class	Private Second Class	Private	Enlisted Man of Ordnance
Medical Department																	
Corps of Engineers											No Insignia		No Insignia	No Insignia	No Insignia		
Ordnance Department																	No Insignia
Cavalry			No Insignia	No Insignia						No Insignia		No Insignia				No Insignia	
Dragoons			No Insignia	No Insignia						No Insignia		No Insignia				No Insignia	
Mounted Riflemen			No Insignia	No Insignia						No Insignia		No Insignia				No Insignia	
Artillery			No Insignia								No Insignia		No Insignia			No Insignia	
Infantry			No Insignia								No Insignia					No Insignia	

The army was reorganized for the Civil War.

On July 29, 1861 the ranks of commissary sergeant, saddler sergeant, veterinary sergeant, hospital steward, company quartermaster sergeant and wagoner were added to the cavalry. The ranks of commissary sergeant, drum major and leader of the band and hospital steward were added to the infantry. The ranks of commissary sergeant, hospital steward and battery quartermaster sergeant were added to the artillery.

Regimental hospital stewards wore the same insignia as those in the Medical Department. No insignia was ever prescribed for the other new ranks. Photographic evidence shows that company or battery quartermaster sergeants wore three chevrons and one tie.

On August 3, 1861 the enlisted ranks of master wagoner and wagoner were added to the Quartermaster's Department. Medical cadets were added to the Medical Department. This rank is included in the total for enlisted men on the 1863 table of organization, therefore this was an enlisted rank. The Corps of Topographical Engineers gained a company of enlisted men. The regiments of dragoons and mounted riflemen were converted to cavalry regiments.

An infantry regiment was designated sharpshooters and given green chevrons. The topographic engineer company may have not been organized or was organized as a regular engineer company, making yellow chevrons a safe assumption.

Medical cadets wore officer's undress uniforms with a green shoulder strap with a strip of gold lace.

== US Army Chevrons 1861 ==
	Medical Cadet	Sergeant Major	Quartermaster Sergeant	Commissary Sergeant	Drum Major or Leader of the Band	Principal Musician	Chief Bugler	Veterinary Sergeant	Saddler Sergeant	Hospital Steward	Ordnance Sergeant	First Sergeant	Company/Battery Quartermaster Sergeant	Sergeant	Corporal	Bugler	Musician	Farrier and Blacksmith	Artificer	Saddler	Master Wagoner	Wagoner	Private First Class	Private Second Class	Private	Enlisted Man of Ordnance
Quartermaster's Department																					No Insignia	No Insignia				
Medical Department																										
Corps of Engineers																	No Insignia		No Insignia				No Insignia	No Insignia		
Corps of Topographical Engineers																	No Insignia		No Insignia				No Insignia	No Insignia		
Ordnance Department																										No Insignia
Cavalry				No Insignia Prescribed		No Insignia	No Insignia	No Insignia Prescribed	No Insignia Prescribed				No Insignia Prescribed, Three Chevrons and one Tie Worn			No Insignia		No Insignia		No Insignia		No Insignia			No Insignia	
Artillery				No Insignia Prescribed		No Insignia							No Insignia Prescribed, Three Chevrons and one Tie Worn				No Insignia		No Insignia			No Insignia			No Insignia	
Infantry				No Insignia Prescribed	No Insignia Prescribed	No Insignia											No Insignia								No Insignia	
Sharpshooters				No Insignia Prescribed	No Insignia Prescribed	No Insignia											No Insignia								No Insignia	On July 5, 1862

On July 5, 1862, enlisted men of ordnance were given the ranks of sergeant, corporal, private first class and private second class.

On July 29, 1862, Veterinary sergeants and principal musicians were eliminated from the cavalry. Chief buglers were changed to chief trumpeters, chief farriers and blacksmiths and teamsters were added.

== US Army Chevrons 1862 ==
	Medical Cadet	Sergeant Major	Quartermaster Sergeant	Commissary Sergeant	Drum Major or Leader of the Band	Principal Musician	Chief Trumpeter	Saddler Sergeant	Hospital Steward	Ordnance Sergeant	First Sergeant	Company/Battery/ TroopQuartermaster Sergeant	Sergeant	Corporal	Bugler	Musician	Chief Farrier and Blacksmith	Farrier and Blacksmith	Artificer	Saddler	Master Wagoner	Wagoner	Teamster	Private First Class	Private Second Class	Private
Quartermaster's Department																					No Insignia	No Insignia				
Medical Department																										
Corps of Engineers																No Insignia			No Insignia					No Insignia	No Insignia	
Corps of Topographical Engineers																No Insignia			No Insignia					No Insignia	No Insignia	
Ordnance Department																								No Insignia	No Insignia	
Cavalry				No Insignia Prescribed			No Insignia	No Insignia Prescribed				No Insignia Prescribed, Three Chevrons and one Tie Worn			No Insignia		No Insignia	No Insignia		No Insignia		No Insignia	No Insignia			No Insignia
Artillery				No Insignia Prescribed		No Insignia						No Insignia Prescribed, Three Chevrons and one Tie Worn				No Insignia			No Insignia			No Insignia				No Insignia
Infantry				No Insignia Prescribed	No Insignia Prescribed	No Insignia										No Insignia										No Insignia
Sharpshooters				No Insignia Prescribed	No Insignia Prescribed	No Insignia										No Insignia										No Insignia

On March 3, 1863, the Corps of Topographical Engineers was merged into the Corps of Engineers. The cavalry lost its teamsters and chief farriers and blacksmiths and buglers became trumpeters. The Signal Corps was organized with the enlisted ranks of sergeant, private first class and private second class.

Sergeants of the Signal Corps wore yellow chevrons with crossed signal flags and privates just the flags.

On April 28, 1863, an Invalid Corps was added to the army.

On May 15, 1863, the Invalid Corps was given light blue uniforms with dark blue trimming and therefore dark blue chevrons.

== US Army Chevrons 1863 ==
	Medical Cadet	Sergeant Major	Quartermaster Sergeant	Commissary Sergeant	Drum Major or Leader of the Band	Principal Musician	Chief Trumpeter	Saddler Sergeant	Hospital Steward	Ordnance Sergeant	First Sergeant	Company/Battery/ TroopQuartermaster Sergeant	Sergeant	Corporal	Trumpeter	Musician	Farrier and Blacksmith	Artificer	Saddler	Master Wagoner	Wagoner	Private First Class	Private Second Class	Private
Quartermaster's Department																				No Insignia	No Insignia			
Medical Department																								
Corps of Engineers																No Insignia		No Insignia				No Insignia	No Insignia	
Signal Corps																								
Ordnance Department																						No Insignia	No Insignia	
Cavalry				No Insignia Prescribed		No Insignia	No Insignia	No Insignia Prescribed				No Insignia Prescribed, Three Chevrons and one Tie Worn			No Insignia		No Insignia		No Insignia		No Insignia			No Insignia
Artillery				No Insignia Prescribed		No Insignia						No Insignia Prescribed, Three Chevrons and one Tie Worn				No Insignia		No Insignia			No Insignia			No Insignia
Infantry				No Insignia Prescribed	No Insignia Prescribed	No Insignia										No Insignia								No Insignia
Sharpshooters				No Insignia Prescribed	No Insignia Prescribed	No Insignia										No Insignia								No Insignia
Invalid Corps				No Insignia Prescribed	No Insignia Prescribed	No Insignia										No Insignia								No Insignia

On March 18, 1864, the Invalid Corps was renamed the Veteran Reserve Corps.

On June 20, 1864, the Corps of Engineers was allowed a sergeant major and a quartermaster sergeant.

== US Army Chevrons 1864-1865 ==
	Medical Cadet	Sergeant Major	Quartermaster Sergeant	Commissary Sergeant	Drum Major or Leader of the Band	Principal Musician	Chief Trumpeter	Saddler Sergeant	Hospital Steward	Ordnance Sergeant	First Sergeant	Company/Battery/ TroopQuartermaster Sergeant	Sergeant	Corporal	Trumpeter	Musician	Farrier and Blacksmith	Artificer	Saddler	Master Wagoner	Wagoner !	Private First Class	Private Second Class	Private
Quartermaster's Department																				No Insignia	No Insignia			
Medical Department																								
Corps of Engineers																No Insignia		No Insignia				No Insignia	No Insignia	
Signal Corps																								
Ordnance Department																						No Insignia	No Insignia	
Cavalry				No Insignia Prescribed		No Insignia	No Insignia	No Insignia Prescribed				No Insignia Prescribed, Three Chevrons and one Tie Worn			No Insignia		No Insignia		No Insignia		No Insignia			No Insignia
Artillery				No Insignia Prescribed		No Insignia						No Insignia Prescribed, Three Chevrons and one Tie Worn				No Insignia		No Insignia			No Insignia			No Insignia
Infantry				No Insignia Prescribed	No Insignia Prescribed	No Insignia										No Insignia								No Insignia
Sharpshooters				No Insignia Prescribed	No Insignia Prescribed	No Insignia										No Insignia								No Insignia
Veteran Reserve Corps				No Insignia Prescribed	No Insignia Prescribed	No Insignia										No Insignia								No Insignia

The army was given a postwar reorganization on July 28, 1866.

Medical Cadets, drum majors and leaders of the band, artificers of engineers and enlisted men in the Signal Corps were eliminated (men could be detailed from the Corps of Engineers for signal duties). Company quartermaster sergeants, artificers and wagoners were added to the infantry and Veteran Reserve Corps. Bands were added to brigades and posts.

The three chevrons and one tie for company level quartermaster sergeants was made official on December 31, 1866.

== US Army Chevrons 1866 ==
	Sergeant Major	Quartermaster Sergeant	Commissary Sergeant	Principal Musician	Saddler Sergeant	Chief Trumpeter	Ordnance Sergeant	Hospital Steward	Regimental Hospital Steward	Battalion Sergeant Major	Battalion Quartermaster Sergeant	First Sergeant	Company Quartermaster Sergeant	Sergeant	Corporal	Trumpeter	Musician	Farriers and Blacksmith	Artificer	Saddler	Master Wagoner	Wagoner	Private First Class	Private Second Class	Private
Quartermaster's Department																					No Insignia	No Insignia			
Medical Department																									
Corps of Engineers																	No Insignia						No Insignia	No Insignia	
Ordnance Department																							No Insignia	No Insignia	
Cavalry			No Insignia Prescribed		No Insignia Prescribed	No Insignia										No Insignia		No Insignia		No Insignia		No Insignia			No Insignia
Artillery			No Insignia Prescribed	No Insignia													No Insignia		No Insignia			No Insignia			No Insignia
Infantry			No Insignia Prescribed	No Insignia													No Insignia		No Insignia			No Insignia			No Insignia
Veteran Reserve Corps			No Insignia Prescribed	No Insignia													No Insignia		No Insignia			No Insignia			No Insignia
Brigade or Post Bands																	No Insignia								

On April 9, 1867, commissary sergeants were prescribed three chevrons and three more point up chevrons and regimental hospital stewards were prescribed three chevrons and an oval with a dark blue caduceus.

== US Army Chevrons 1867 ==
	Sergeant Major	Quartermaster Sergeant	Commissary Sergeant	Principal Musician	Saddler Sergeant	Chief Trumpeter	Ordnance Sergeant	Hospital Steward	Regimental Hospital Steward	Battalion Sergeant Major	Battalion Quartermaster Sergeant	First Sergeant	Company Quartermaster Sergeant	Sergeant	Corporal	Trumpeter	Musician	Farriers and Blacksmith	Artificer	Saddler	Master Wagoner	Wagoner	Private First Class	Private Second Class	Private
Quartermaster's Department																					No Insignia	No Insignia			
Medical Department																									
Corps of Engineers																	No Insignia						No Insignia	No Insignia	
Ordnance Department																							No Insignia	No Insignia	
Cavalry					No Insignia Prescribed	No Insignia										No Insignia		No Insignia		No Insignia		No Insignia			No Insignia
Artillery				No Insignia													No Insignia		No Insignia			No Insignia			No Insignia
Infantry				No Insignia													No Insignia		No Insignia			No Insignia			No Insignia
Veteran Reserve Corps				No Insignia													No Insignia		No Insignia			No Insignia			No Insignia
Brigade or Post Bands																	No Insignia								

On October 22, 1868, enlisted men of the Corps of Engineers that were detailed to signal duty were allowed to wear signal flags.

== US Army Chevrons 1868 ==
	! class="nowrap ts-vertical-header " style="" | Sergeant Major	! class="nowrap ts-vertical-header " style="" | Quartermaster Sergeant	! class="nowrap ts-vertical-header " style="" | Commissary Sergeant	! class="nowrap ts-vertical-header " style="" | Principal Musician	! class="nowrap ts-vertical-header " style="" | Saddler Sergeant	! class="nowrap ts-vertical-header " style="" | Chief Trumpeter	! class="nowrap ts-vertical-header " style="" | Ordnance Sergeant	! class="nowrap ts-vertical-header " style="" | Hospital Steward	! class="nowrap ts-vertical-header " style="" | Regimental Hospital Steward	! class="nowrap ts-vertical-header " style="" | Battalion Sergeant Major	! class="nowrap ts-vertical-header " style="" | Battalion Quartermaster Sergeant	! class="nowrap ts-vertical-header " style="" | First Sergeant	! class="nowrap ts-vertical-header " style="" | Company Quartermaster Sergeant	! class="nowrap ts-vertical-header " style="" | Sergeant	! class="nowrap ts-vertical-header " style="" | Corporal	! class="nowrap ts-vertical-header " style="" | Trumpeter	! class="nowrap ts-vertical-header " style="" | Musician	! class="nowrap ts-vertical-header " style="" | Farriers and Blacksmith	! class="nowrap ts-vertical-header " style="" | Artificer	! class="nowrap ts-vertical-header " style="" | Saddler	! class="nowrap ts-vertical-header " style="" | Master Wagoner	! class="nowrap ts-vertical-header " style="" | Wagoner	! class="nowrap ts-vertical-header " style="" | Private First Class	! class="nowrap ts-vertical-header " style="" | Private Second Class	! class="nowrap ts-vertical-header " style="" | Private
Quartermaster's Department																					No Insignia	No Insignia			
Medical Department																									
Corps of Engineers																	No Insignia						No Insignia	No Insignia	
Ordnance Department																							No Insignia	No Insignia	
Cavalry					No Insignia Prescribed	No Insignia										No Insignia		No Insignia		No Insignia		No Insignia			No Insignia
Artillery				No Insignia													No Insignia		No Insignia			No Insignia			No Insignia
Infantry				No Insignia													No Insignia		No Insignia			No Insignia			No Insignia
Veteran Reserve Corps				No Insignia													No Insignia		No Insignia			No Insignia			No Insignia
Brigade or Post Bands																	No Insignia								

On March 3, 1869, the rank of chief musician was added to the infantry, cavalry and artillery. Brigade and post bands and the Veteran Reserve Corps were eliminated. The only non-regimental band was now at the academy.

== US Army Chevrons 1869 ==
	! class="nowrap ts-vertical-header " style="" | Sergeant Major	! class="nowrap ts-vertical-header " style="" | Quartermaster Sergeant	! class="nowrap ts-vertical-header " style="" | Commissary Sergeant	! class="nowrap ts-vertical-header " style="" | Chief Musician	! class="nowrap ts-vertical-header " style="" | Principal Musician	! class="nowrap ts-vertical-header " style="" | Saddler Sergeant	! class="nowrap ts-vertical-header " style="" | Chief Trumpeter	! class="nowrap ts-vertical-header " style="" | Ordnance Sergeant	! class="nowrap ts-vertical-header " style="" | Hospital Steward	! class="nowrap ts-vertical-header " style="" | Regimental Hospital Steward	! class="nowrap ts-vertical-header " style="" | Battalion Sergeant Major	! class="nowrap ts-vertical-header " style="" | Battalion Quartermaster Sergeant	! class="nowrap ts-vertical-header " style="" | First Sergeant	! class="nowrap ts-vertical-header " style="" | Company Quartermaster Sergeant	! class="nowrap ts-vertical-header " style="" | Sergeant	! class="nowrap ts-vertical-header " style="" | Corporal	! class="nowrap ts-vertical-header " style="" | Trumpeter	! class="nowrap ts-vertical-header " style="" | Musician	! class="nowrap ts-vertical-header " style="" | Farriers and Blacksmith	! class="nowrap ts-vertical-header " style="" | Artificer	! class="nowrap ts-vertical-header " style="" | Saddler	! class="nowrap ts-vertical-header " style="" | Master Wagoner	! class="nowrap ts-vertical-header " style="" | Wagoner	! class="nowrap ts-vertical-header " style="" | Private First Class	! class="nowrap ts-vertical-header " style="" | Private Second Class	! class="nowrap ts-vertical-header " style="" | Private
Quartermaster's Department																						No Insignia	No Insignia			
Medical Department																										
Corps of Engineers																		No Insignia						No Insignia	No Insignia	
Engineers detailed to signal duty																										
Ordnance Department																								No Insignia	No Insignia	
Cavalry						No Insignia Prescribed	No Insignia										No Insignia		No Insignia		No Insignia		No Insignia			No Insignia
Artillery				No Insignia	No Insignia													No Insignia		No Insignia			No Insignia			No Insignia
Infantry				No Insignia	No Insignia													No Insignia		No Insignia			No Insignia			No Insignia
Military Academy Band																		No Insignia								

On July 15, 1870, regimental commissary sergeants and regimental hospital stewards were abolished.

== US Army Chevrons 1870-1871 ==
	! class="nowrap ts-vertical-header " style="" | Sergeant Major	! class="nowrap ts-vertical-header " style="" | Quartermaster Sergeant	! class="nowrap ts-vertical-header " style="" | Chief Musician	! class="nowrap ts-vertical-header " style="" | Principal Musician	! class="nowrap ts-vertical-header " style="" | Saddler Sergeant	! class="nowrap ts-vertical-header " style="" | Chief Trumpeter	! class="nowrap ts-vertical-header " style="" | Ordnance Sergeant	! class="nowrap ts-vertical-header " style="" | Hospital Steward	! class="nowrap ts-vertical-header " style="" | Battalion Sergeant Major	! class="nowrap ts-vertical-header " style="" | Battalion Quartermaster Sergeant	! class="nowrap ts-vertical-header " style="" | First Sergeant	! class="nowrap ts-vertical-header " style="" | Company Quartermaster Sergeant	! class="nowrap ts-vertical-header " style="" | Sergeant	! class="nowrap ts-vertical-header " style="" | Corporal	! class="nowrap ts-vertical-header " style="" | Trumpeter	! class="nowrap ts-vertical-header " style="" | Musician	! class="nowrap ts-vertical-header " style="" | Farriers and Blacksmith	! class="nowrap ts-vertical-header " style="" | Artificer	! class="nowrap ts-vertical-header " style="" | Saddler	! class="nowrap ts-vertical-header " style="" | Master Wagoner	! class="nowrap ts-vertical-header " style="" | Wagoner	! class="nowrap ts-vertical-header " style="" | Private First Class	! class="nowrap ts-vertical-header " style="" | Private Second Class	! class="nowrap ts-vertical-header " style="" | Private
Quartermaster's Department																				No Insignia	No Insignia			
Medical Department																								
Corps of Engineers																No Insignia						No Insignia	No Insignia	
Engineers detailed to signal duty																								
Ordnance Department																						No Insignia	No Insignia	
Cavalry					No Insignia Prescribed	No Insignia									No Insignia		No Insignia		No Insignia		No Insignia			No Insignia
Artillery			No Insignia	No Insignia												No Insignia		No Insignia			No Insignia			No Insignia
Infantry			No Insignia	No Insignia												No Insignia		No Insignia			No Insignia			No Insignia
Military Academy Band																No Insignia								

On May 15, 1872, promotions to company level quartermaster sergeant were ceased.

On July 29, 1872, the army issued new uniform regulations. The construction of chevrons was changed. The designs were now cut from a single piece of cloth of the color of the appropriate branch. The chevrons were then laid out in stitching of heavy black thread. The Corps of Engineers switched from cavalry yellow to artillery red with the stitching done in white thread. Orange was assigned to the signal detachment. Principal musicians were given three chevrons and a bugle.

== US Army Chevrons 1872 ==
	! class="nowrap ts-vertical-header " style="" | Sergeant Major	! class="nowrap ts-vertical-header " style="" | Quartermaster Sergeant	! class="nowrap ts-vertical-header " style="" | Chief Musician	! class="nowrap ts-vertical-header " style="" | Principal Musician	! class="nowrap ts-vertical-header " style="" | Saddler Sergeant	! class="nowrap ts-vertical-header " style="" | Chief Trumpeter	! class="nowrap ts-vertical-header " style="" | Ordnance Sergeant	! class="nowrap ts-vertical-header " style="" | Hospital Steward	! class="nowrap ts-vertical-header " style="" | Battalion Sergeant Major	! class="nowrap ts-vertical-header " style="" | Battalion Quartermaster Sergeant	! class="nowrap ts-vertical-header " style="" | First Sergeant	! class="nowrap ts-vertical-header " style="" | Sergeant	! class="nowrap ts-vertical-header " style="" | Corporal	! class="nowrap ts-vertical-header " style="" | Trumpeter	! class="nowrap ts-vertical-header " style="" | Musician	! class="nowrap ts-vertical-header " style="" | Farriers and Blacksmith	! class="nowrap ts-vertical-header " style="" | Artificer	! class="nowrap ts-vertical-header " style="" | Saddler	! class="nowrap ts-vertical-header " style="" | Master Wagoner	! class="nowrap ts-vertical-header " style="" | Wagoner	! class="nowrap ts-vertical-header " style="" | Private First Class	! class="nowrap ts-vertical-header " style="" | Private Second Class	! class="nowrap ts-vertical-header " style="" | Private
Quartermaster's Department																			No Insignia	No Insignia			
Medical Department																							
Corps of Engineers															No Insignia						No Insignia	No Insignia	
Ordnance Department																					No Insignia	No Insignia	
Signal Detachment																							
Cavalry					No Insignia Prescribed	No Insignia								No Insignia		No Insignia		No Insignia		No Insignia			No Insignia
Artillery			No Insignia												No Insignia		No Insignia			No Insignia			No Insignia
Infantry			No Insignia												No Insignia		No Insignia			No Insignia			No Insignia
Military Academy Band															No Insignia								

On March 3, 1873, the rank of commissary sergeant was added to the army's Subsistence Department.

Insignia was prescribed on March 20, 1873. Commissary Sergeants were to wear three gray chevrons and a gray crescent.

On June 25, 1873, saddler sergeants were given three chevrons and a saddle knife and chief trumpeters were given three chevrons, one arc and a bugle.

== US Army Chevrons 1873-1875 ==
	! class="nowrap ts-vertical-header " style="" | Sergeant Major	! class="nowrap ts-vertical-header " style="" | Quartermaster Sergeant	! class="nowrap ts-vertical-header " style="" | Chief Musician	! class="nowrap ts-vertical-header " style="" | Principal Musician	! class="nowrap ts-vertical-header " style="" | Saddler Sergeant	! class="nowrap ts-vertical-header " style="" | Chief Trumpeter	! class="nowrap ts-vertical-header " style="" | Ordnance Sergeant	! class="nowrap ts-vertical-header " style="" | Commissary Sergeant	Hospital Steward	! class="nowrap ts-vertical-header " style="" | Battalion Sergeant Major	! class="nowrap ts-vertical-header " style="" | Battalion Quartermaster Sergeant	! class="nowrap ts-vertical-header " style="" | First Sergeant	! class="nowrap ts-vertical-header " style="" | Sergeant	! class="nowrap ts-vertical-header " style="" | Corporal	! class="nowrap ts-vertical-header " style="" | Trumpeter	! class="nowrap ts-vertical-header " style="" | Musician	! class="nowrap ts-vertical-header " style="" | Farriers and Blacksmith	! class="nowrap ts-vertical-header " style="" | Artificer	! class="nowrap ts-vertical-header " style="" | Saddler	! class="nowrap ts-vertical-header " style="" | Master Wagoner	! class="nowrap ts-vertical-header " style="" | Wagoner	! class="nowrap ts-vertical-header " style="" | Private First Class	! class="nowrap ts-vertical-header " style="" | Private Second Class	! class="nowrap ts-vertical-header " style="" | Private
Subsistence Department																								
Quartermaster's Department																				No Insignia	No Insignia			
Medical Department																								
Corps of Engineers																No Insignia						No Insignia	No Insignia	
Ordnance Department																						No Insignia	No Insignia	
Signal Detachment																								
Cavalry															No Insignia		No Insignia		No Insignia		No Insignia			No Insignia
Artillery			No Insignia													No Insignia		No Insignia			No Insignia			No Insignia
Infantry			No Insignia													No Insignia		No Insignia			No Insignia			No Insignia
Military Academy Band																No Insignia								

On March 20, 1876, the chevrons for overcoats of the infantry were changed to dark blue.

On July 24, 1876, Indian scouts were classified as privates by law.

== US Army Chevrons 1876-1877 ==
	! class="nowrap ts-vertical-header " style="" | Sergeant Major	! class="nowrap ts-vertical-header " style="" | Quartermaster Sergeant	! class="nowrap ts-vertical-header " style="" | Chief Musician	! class="nowrap ts-vertical-header " style="" | Principal Musician	! class="nowrap ts-vertical-header " style="" | Saddler Sergeant	! class="nowrap ts-vertical-header " style="" | Chief Trumpeter	! class="nowrap ts-vertical-header " style="" | Ordnance Sergeant	! class="nowrap ts-vertical-header " style="" | Commissary Sergeant	Hospital Steward	! class="nowrap ts-vertical-header " style="" | Battalion Sergeant Major	! class="nowrap ts-vertical-header " style="" | Battalion Quartermaster Sergeant	! class="nowrap ts-vertical-header " style="" | First Sergeant	! class="nowrap ts-vertical-header " style="" | Sergeant	! class="nowrap ts-vertical-header " style="" | Corporal	! class="nowrap ts-vertical-header " style="" | Trumpeter	! class="nowrap ts-vertical-header " style="" | Musician	! class="nowrap ts-vertical-header " style="" | Farriers and Blacksmith	! class="nowrap ts-vertical-header " style="" | Artificer	! class="nowrap ts-vertical-header " style="" | Saddler	! class="nowrap ts-vertical-header " style="" | Master Wagoner	! class="nowrap ts-vertical-header " style="" | Wagoner	! class="nowrap ts-vertical-header " style="" | Private First Class	! class="nowrap ts-vertical-header " style="" | Private Second Class	! class="nowrap ts-vertical-header " style="" | Private
Subsistence Department																								
Quartermaster's Department																				No Insignia	No Insignia			
Medical Department																								
Corps of Engineers																No Insignia						No Insignia	No Insignia	
Ordnance Department																						No Insignia	No Insignia	
Signal Detachment																								
Cavalry															No Insignia		No Insignia		No Insignia		No Insignia			No Insignia
Artillery			No Insignia													No Insignia		No Insignia			No Insignia			No Insignia
Infantry			No Insignia													No Insignia		No Insignia			No Insignia			No Insignia
Military Academy Band																No Insignia								
Indian Scouts																								No Insignia

On June 20, 1878, the Signal Corps was officially made part of the army, and it included corporals.

== US Army Chevrons 1878 ==
	! class="nowrap ts-vertical-header " style="" | Sergeant Major	! class="nowrap ts-vertical-header " style="" | Quartermaster Sergeant	! class="nowrap ts-vertical-header " style="" | Chief Musician	! class="nowrap ts-vertical-header " style="" | Principal Musician	! class="nowrap ts-vertical-header " style="" | Saddler Sergeant	! class="nowrap ts-vertical-header " style="" | Chief Trumpeter	! class="nowrap ts-vertical-header " style="" | Ordnance Sergeant	! class="nowrap ts-vertical-header " style="" | Commissary Sergeant	Hospital Steward	! class="nowrap ts-vertical-header " style="" | Battalion Sergeant Major	! class="nowrap ts-vertical-header " style="" | Battalion Quartermaster Sergeant	! class="nowrap ts-vertical-header " style="" | First Sergeant	! class="nowrap ts-vertical-header " style="" | Sergeant	! class="nowrap ts-vertical-header " style="" | Corporal	! class="nowrap ts-vertical-header " style="" | Trumpeter	! class="nowrap ts-vertical-header " style="" | Musician	! class="nowrap ts-vertical-header " style="" | Farriers and Blacksmith	! class="nowrap ts-vertical-header " style="" | Artificer	! class="nowrap ts-vertical-header " style="" | Saddler	! class="nowrap ts-vertical-header " style="" | Master Wagoner	! class="nowrap ts-vertical-header " style="" | Wagoner	! class="nowrap ts-vertical-header " style="" | Private First Class	! class="nowrap ts-vertical-header " style="" | Private Second Class	! class="nowrap ts-vertical-header " style="" | Private
Subsistence Department																								
Quartermaster's Department																				No Insignia	No Insignia			
Medical Department																								
Corps of Engineers																No Insignia						No Insignia	No Insignia	
Ordnance Department																						No Insignia	No Insignia	
Signal Corps																								
Cavalry															No Insignia		No Insignia		No Insignia		No Insignia			No Insignia
Artillery			No Insignia													No Insignia		No Insignia			No Insignia			No Insignia
Infantry			No Insignia													No Insignia		No Insignia			No Insignia			No Insignia
Military Academy Band																No Insignia								
Indian Scouts																								No Insignia

By 1879 there were no longer wagoners and master wagoners in the Quartermaster's Department.

== US Army Chevrons 1879-1882 ==
	! class="nowrap ts-vertical-header " style="" | Sergeant Major	! class="nowrap ts-vertical-header " style="" | Quartermaster Sergeant	! class="nowrap ts-vertical-header " style="" | Chief Musician	! class="nowrap ts-vertical-header " style="" | Principal Musician	! class="nowrap ts-vertical-header " style="" | Saddler Sergeant	! class="nowrap ts-vertical-header " style="" | Chief Trumpeter	! class="nowrap ts-vertical-header " style="" | Ordnance Sergeant	! class="nowrap ts-vertical-header " style="" | Commissary Sergeant	Hospital Steward	! class="nowrap ts-vertical-header " style="" | Battalion Sergeant Major	! class="nowrap ts-vertical-header " style="" | Battalion Quartermaster Sergeant	! class="nowrap ts-vertical-header " style="" | First Sergeant	! class="nowrap ts-vertical-header " style="" | Sergeant	! class="nowrap ts-vertical-header " style="" | Corporal	! class="nowrap ts-vertical-header " style="" | Trumpeter	! class="nowrap ts-vertical-header " style="" | Musician	! class="nowrap ts-vertical-header " style="" | Farriers and Blacksmith	! class="nowrap ts-vertical-header " style="" | Artificer	! class="nowrap ts-vertical-header " style="" | Saddler	! class="nowrap ts-vertical-header " style="" | Wagoner	! class="nowrap ts-vertical-header " style="" | Private First Class	! class="nowrap ts-vertical-header " style="" | Private Second Class	! class="nowrap ts-vertical-header " style="" | Private
Subsistence Department																							
Medical Department																							
Corps of Engineers																No Insignia					No Insignia	No Insignia	
Ordnance Department																					No Insignia	No Insignia	
Signal Corps																							
Cavalry															No Insignia		No Insignia		No Insignia	No Insignia			No Insignia
Artillery			No Insignia													No Insignia		No Insignia		No Insignia			No Insignia
Infantry			No Insignia													No Insignia		No Insignia		No Insignia			No Insignia
Military Academy Band																No Insignia							
Indian Scouts																							No Insignia

On June 6, 1883, sergeants who were acting as color sergeants were allowed to add a sphere in the angle of their chevrons. At the same time farriers were allowed to wear a horseshoe.

== US Army Chevrons 1883 ==
	! class="nowrap ts-vertical-header " style="" | Sergeant Major	! class="nowrap ts-vertical-header " style="" | Quartermaster Sergeant	! class="nowrap ts-vertical-header " style="" | Chief Musician	! class="nowrap ts-vertical-header " style="" | Principal Musician	! class="nowrap ts-vertical-header " style="" | Saddler Sergeant	! class="nowrap ts-vertical-header " style="" | Chief Trumpeter	! class="nowrap ts-vertical-header " style="" | Ordnance Sergeant	! class="nowrap ts-vertical-header " style="" | Commissary Sergeant	Hospital Steward	! class="nowrap ts-vertical-header " style="" | Battalion Sergeant Major	! class="nowrap ts-vertical-header " style="" | Battalion Quartermaster Sergeant	! class="nowrap ts-vertical-header " style="" | First Sergeant	! class="nowrap ts-vertical-header " style="" | Sergeant Serving as Color Sergeant	Sergeant	! class="nowrap ts-vertical-header " style="" | Corporal	! class="nowrap ts-vertical-header " style="" | Trumpeter	! class="nowrap ts-vertical-header " style="" | Musician	! class="nowrap ts-vertical-header " style="" | Farriers and Blacksmith	! class="nowrap ts-vertical-header " style="" | Artificer	! class="nowrap ts-vertical-header " style="" | Saddler	! class="nowrap ts-vertical-header " style="" | Wagoner	! class="nowrap ts-vertical-header " style="" | Private First Class	! class="nowrap ts-vertical-header " style="" | Private Second Class	! class="nowrap ts-vertical-header " style="" | Private
Subsistence Department																								
Medical Department																								
Corps of Engineers																	No Insignia					No Insignia	No Insignia	
Ordnance Department																						No Insignia	No Insignia	
Signal Corps																								
Cavalry																No Insignia				No Insignia	No Insignia			No Insignia
Artillery			No Insignia														No Insignia		No Insignia		No Insignia			No Insignia
Infantry			No Insignia														No Insignia		No Insignia		No Insignia			No Insignia
Military Academy Band																	No Insignia							
Indian Scouts																								No Insignia

On July 5, 1884, the rank of post quartermaster sergeant was added to the Quartermaster's Department.

Insignia was prescribed on September 12, 1884, of three chevrons in buff with a gold key and quill.

The same order changed the chevrons worn on dress coats. The chevrons would be made from gold lace placed on cloth of the appropriate color with engineers adding white stitching around the lace.

The chevrons for color sergeants are described as being for "regimental and battalion color sergeants". This would indicate that there was a color sergeant in the engineer battalion.

On October 24, 1884, the color of the infantry was changed from sky blue to white, dark blue chevrons on overcoats continued.

== US Army Dress Chevrons 1884 ==
	! class="nowrap ts-vertical-header " style="" | Sergeant Major	! class="nowrap ts-vertical-header " style="" | Quartermaster Sergeant	! class="nowrap ts-vertical-header " style="" | Chief Musician	! class="nowrap ts-vertical-header " style="" | Principal Musician	! class="nowrap ts-vertical-header " style="" | Saddler Sergeant	! class="nowrap ts-vertical-header " style="" | Chief Trumpeter	! class="nowrap ts-vertical-header " style="" | Ordnance Sergeant	! class="nowrap ts-vertical-header " style="" | Post Quartermaster Sergeant	Commissary Sergeant	Hospital Steward	! class="nowrap ts-vertical-header " style="" | Battalion Sergeant Major	! class="nowrap ts-vertical-header " style="" | Battalion Quartermaster Sergeant	! class="nowrap ts-vertical-header " style="" | First Sergeant	! class="nowrap ts-vertical-header " style="" | Sergeant Serving as Color Sergeant	Sergeant	! class="nowrap ts-vertical-header " style="" | Corporal	! class="nowrap ts-vertical-header " style="" | Trumpeter	! class="nowrap ts-vertical-header " style="" | Musician	! class="nowrap ts-vertical-header " style="" | Farriers and Blacksmith	! class="nowrap ts-vertical-header " style="" | Artificer	! class="nowrap ts-vertical-header " style="" | Saddler	! class="nowrap ts-vertical-header " style="" | Wagoner	! class="nowrap ts-vertical-header " style="" | Private First Class	! class="nowrap ts-vertical-header " style="" | Private Second Class	! class="nowrap ts-vertical-header " style="" | Private
Quartermaster's Department																									
Subsistence Department																									
Medical Department																									
Corps of Engineers																		No Insignia					No Insignia	No Insignia	
Ordnance Department																							No Insignia	No Insignia	
Signal Corps																									
Cavalry																	No Insignia				No Insignia	No Insignia			No Insignia
Artillery			No Insignia															No Insignia		No Insignia		No Insignia			No Insignia
Infantry			No Insignia															No Insignia		No Insignia		No Insignia			No Insignia
Military Academy Band																		No Insignia							
Indian Scouts																									No Insignia

== US Army Cloth Chevrons 1885 ==
	! class="nowrap ts-vertical-header " style="" | Sergeant Major	! class="nowrap ts-vertical-header " style="" | Quartermaster Sergeant	! class="nowrap ts-vertical-header " style="" | Chief Musician	! class="nowrap ts-vertical-header " style="" | Principal Musician	! class="nowrap ts-vertical-header " style="" | Saddler Sergeant	! class="nowrap ts-vertical-header " style="" | Chief Trumpeter	! class="nowrap ts-vertical-header " style="" | Ordnance Sergeant	! class="nowrap ts-vertical-header " style="" | Post Quartermaster Sergeant	Commissary Sergeant	Hospital Steward	! class="nowrap ts-vertical-header " style="" | Battalion Sergeant Major	! class="nowrap ts-vertical-header " style="" | Battalion Quartermaster Sergeant	! class="nowrap ts-vertical-header " style="" | First Sergeant	! class="nowrap ts-vertical-header " style="" | Sergeant Serving as Color Sergeant	Sergeant	! class="nowrap ts-vertical-header " style="" | Corporal	! class="nowrap ts-vertical-header " style="" | Trumpeter	! class="nowrap ts-vertical-header " style="" | Musician	! class="nowrap ts-vertical-header " style="" | Farriers and Blacksmith	! class="nowrap ts-vertical-header " style="" | Artificer	! class="nowrap ts-vertical-header " style="" | Saddler	! class="nowrap ts-vertical-header " style="" | Wagoner	! class="nowrap ts-vertical-header " style="" | Private First Class	! class="nowrap ts-vertical-header " style="" | Private Second Class	! class="nowrap ts-vertical-header " style="" | Private
Quartermaster's Department																									
Subsistence Department																									
Medical Department																									
Corps of Engineers																		No Insignia					No Insignia	No Insignia	
Ordnance Department																							No Insignia	No Insignia	
Signal Corps																									
Cavalry																	No Insignia				No Insignia	No Insignia			No Insignia
Artillery			No Insignia															No Insignia		No Insignia		No Insignia			No Insignia
Infantry			No Insignia															No Insignia		No Insignia		No Insignia			No Insignia
Military Academy Band																		No Insignia							
Indian Scouts															No Insignia	No Insignia									No Insignia

On July 29, 1886, 170 men were added to the army over an above its allowed strength, for clerical duties. These men were known as general service clerks and general service messengers.

== US Army Cloth Chevrons 1886 ==
	! class="nowrap ts-vertical-header " style="" | Sergeant Major	! class="nowrap ts-vertical-header " style="" | Quartermaster Sergeant	! class="nowrap ts-vertical-header " style="" | Chief Musician	! class="nowrap ts-vertical-header " style="" | Principal Musician	! class="nowrap ts-vertical-header " style="" | Saddler Sergeant	! class="nowrap ts-vertical-header " style="" | Chief Trumpeter	! class="nowrap ts-vertical-header " style="" | Ordnance Sergeant	! class="nowrap ts-vertical-header " style="" | Post Quartermaster Sergeant	Commissary Sergeant	Hospital Steward	! class="nowrap ts-vertical-header " style="" | Battalion Sergeant Major	! class="nowrap ts-vertical-header " style="" | Battalion Quartermaster Sergeant	! class="nowrap ts-vertical-header " style="" | First Sergeant	! class="nowrap ts-vertical-header " style="" | Sergeant Serving as Color Sergeant	Sergeant	! class="nowrap ts-vertical-header " style="" | Corporal	! class="nowrap ts-vertical-header " style="" | Trumpeter	! class="nowrap ts-vertical-header " style="" | Musician	! class="nowrap ts-vertical-header " style="" | Farriers and Blacksmith	! class="nowrap ts-vertical-header " style="" | Artificer	! class="nowrap ts-vertical-header " style="" | Saddler	! class="nowrap ts-vertical-header " style="" | Wagoner	! class="nowrap ts-vertical-header " style="" | Private First Class	! class="nowrap ts-vertical-header " style="" | Private Second Class	! class="nowrap ts-vertical-header " style="" | Private	! class="nowrap ts-vertical-header " style="" | General Service Clerk	! class="nowrap ts-vertical-header " style="" | General Service Messenger
General Service Clerks and Messengers																										No Insignia	No Insignia
Quartermaster's Department																											
Subsistence Department																											
Medical Department																											
Corps of Engineers																		No Insignia					No Insignia	No Insignia			
Ordnance Department																							No Insignia	No Insignia			
Signal Corps																											
Cavalry																	No Insignia				No Insignia	No Insignia			No Insignia		
Artillery			No Insignia															No Insignia		No Insignia		No Insignia			No Insignia		
Infantry			No Insignia															No Insignia		No Insignia		No Insignia			No Insignia		
Military Academy Band																		No Insignia									
Indian Scouts															No Insignia	No Insignia									No Insignia		

On March 1, 1887, the enlisted men of the Medical Department were organized into a Hospital Corps with the ranks of hospital steward, acting hospital steward and private of the hospital corps.

Chevrons were prescribed on August 11, 1887. The colors for the Hospital Corps would be green with white stitching. Hospital stewards would wear three chevrons and one arc with a red cross in the angle, and acting hospital stewards would wear the same without the arc. The dress chevrons would not have white stitching around the gold lace and there crosses would remain red.

Hospital Steward	Acting Hospital Steward

The shade of yellow used by the cavalry was changed to a much darker hue.

== US Army Cloth Chevrons 1887 ==
	! class="nowrap ts-vertical-header " style="" | Sergeant Major	! class="nowrap ts-vertical-header " style="" | Quartermaster Sergeant	! class="nowrap ts-vertical-header " style="" | Chief Musician	! class="nowrap ts-vertical-header " style="" | Principal Musician	! class="nowrap ts-vertical-header " style="" | Saddler Sergeant	! class="nowrap ts-vertical-header " style="" | Chief Trumpeter	! class="nowrap ts-vertical-header " style="" | Ordnance Sergeant	! class="nowrap ts-vertical-header " style="" | Post Quartermaster Sergeant	Commissary Sergeant	Hospital Steward	! class="nowrap ts-vertical-header " style="" | Acting Hospital Steward	Battalion Sergeant Major	! class="nowrap ts-vertical-header " style="" | Battalion Quartermaster Sergeant	! class="nowrap ts-vertical-header " style="" | First Sergeant	! class="nowrap ts-vertical-header " style="" | Sergeant Serving as Color Sergeant	Sergeant	! class="nowrap ts-vertical-header " style="" | Corporal	! class="nowrap ts-vertical-header " style="" | Trumpeter	! class="nowrap ts-vertical-header " style="" | Musician	! class="nowrap ts-vertical-header " style="" | Farriers and Blacksmith	! class="nowrap ts-vertical-header " style="" | Artificer	! class="nowrap ts-vertical-header " style="" | Saddler	! class="nowrap ts-vertical-header " style="" | Wagoner	Private First Class	! class="nowrap ts-vertical-header " style="" | Private Second Class	! class="nowrap ts-vertical-header " style="" | Private of the Hospital Corps	Private	! class="nowrap ts-vertical-header " style="" | General Service Clerk	! class="nowrap ts-vertical-header " style="" | General Service Messenger
General Service Clerks and Messengers																												No Insignia	No Insignia
Quartermaster's Department																													
Subsistence Department																													
Medical Department																										No Insignia			
Corps of Engineers																			No Insignia					No Insignia	No Insignia				
Ordnance Department																								No Insignia	No Insignia				
Signal Corps																													
Cavalry																		No Insignia				No Insignia	No Insignia				No Insignia		
Artillery			No Insignia																No Insignia		No Insignia		No Insignia				No Insignia		
Infantry			No Insignia																No Insignia		No Insignia		No Insignia				No Insignia		
Military Academy Band																			No Insignia										
Indian Scouts																No Insignia	No Insignia										No Insignia		

On October 2, 1888, the Signal Corps was reduced in size. This eliminated the ranks of private first class and private second class and added the rank of private.

== US Army Cloth Chevrons 1888 ==
	! class="nowrap ts-vertical-header " style="" | Sergeant Major	! class="nowrap ts-vertical-header " style="" | Quartermaster Sergeant	! class="nowrap ts-vertical-header " style="" | Chief Musician	! class="nowrap ts-vertical-header " style="" | Principal Musician	! class="nowrap ts-vertical-header " style="" | Saddler Sergeant	! class="nowrap ts-vertical-header " style="" | Chief Trumpeter	! class="nowrap ts-vertical-header " style="" | Ordnance Sergeant	! class="nowrap ts-vertical-header " style="" | Post Quartermaster Sergeant	Commissary Sergeant	Hospital Steward	! class="nowrap ts-vertical-header " style="" | Acting Hospital Steward	Battalion Sergeant Major	! class="nowrap ts-vertical-header " style="" | Battalion Quartermaster Sergeant	! class="nowrap ts-vertical-header " style="" | First Sergeant	! class="nowrap ts-vertical-header " style="" | Sergeant Serving as Color Sergeant	Sergeant	! class="nowrap ts-vertical-header " style="" | Corporal	! class="nowrap ts-vertical-header " style="" | Trumpeter	! class="nowrap ts-vertical-header " style="" | Musician	! class="nowrap ts-vertical-header " style="" | Farriers and Blacksmith	! class="nowrap ts-vertical-header " style="" | Artificer	! class="nowrap ts-vertical-header " style="" | Saddler	! class="nowrap ts-vertical-header " style="" | Wagoner	Private First Class	! class="nowrap ts-vertical-header " style="" | Private Second Class	! class="nowrap ts-vertical-header " style="" | Private of the Hospital Corps	Private	! class="nowrap ts-vertical-header " style="" | General Service Clerk	! class="nowrap ts-vertical-header " style="" | General Service Messenger
General Service Clerks and Messengers																												No Insignia	No Insignia
Quartermaster's Department																													
Subsistence Department																													
Medical Department																										No Insignia			
Corps of Engineers																			No Insignia					No Insignia	No Insignia				
Ordnance Department																								No Insignia	No Insignia				
Signal Corps																													
Cavalry																		No Insignia				No Insignia	No Insignia				No Insignia		
Artillery			No Insignia																No Insignia		No Insignia		No Insignia				No Insignia		
Infantry			No Insignia																No Insignia		No Insignia		No Insignia				No Insignia		
Military Academy Band																			No Insignia										
Indian Scouts																No Insignia	No Insignia										No Insignia		

On February 16, 1889, the chevrons for the Signal Corps were changed to black braid without the flags. There were no dress chevrons.

== US Army Cloth Chevrons 1889 ==
	! class="nowrap ts-vertical-header " style="" | Sergeant Major	! class="nowrap ts-vertical-header " style="" | Quartermaster Sergeant	! class="nowrap ts-vertical-header " style="" | Chief Musician	! class="nowrap ts-vertical-header " style="" | Principal Musician	! class="nowrap ts-vertical-header " style="" | Saddler Sergeant	! class="nowrap ts-vertical-header " style="" | Chief Trumpeter	! class="nowrap ts-vertical-header " style="" | Ordnance Sergeant	! class="nowrap ts-vertical-header " style="" | Post Quartermaster Sergeant	Commissary Sergeant	Hospital Steward	! class="nowrap ts-vertical-header " style="" | Acting Hospital Steward	Battalion Sergeant Major	! class="nowrap ts-vertical-header " style="" | Battalion Quartermaster Sergeant	! class="nowrap ts-vertical-header " style="" | First Sergeant	! class="nowrap ts-vertical-header " style="" | Sergeant Serving as Color Sergeant	Sergeant	! class="nowrap ts-vertical-header " style="" | Corporal	! class="nowrap ts-vertical-header " style="" | Trumpeter	! class="nowrap ts-vertical-header " style="" | Musician	! class="nowrap ts-vertical-header " style="" | Farriers and Blacksmith	! class="nowrap ts-vertical-header " style="" | Artificer	! class="nowrap ts-vertical-header " style="" | Saddler	! class="nowrap ts-vertical-header " style="" | Wagoner	Private First Class	! class="nowrap ts-vertical-header " style="" | Private Second Class	! class="nowrap ts-vertical-header " style="" | Private of the Hospital Corps	Private	! class="nowrap ts-vertical-header " style="" | General Service Clerk	! class="nowrap ts-vertical-header " style="" | General Service Messenger
General Service Clerks and Messengers																												No Insignia	No Insignia
Quartermaster's Department																													
Subsistence Department																													
Medical Department																										No Insignia			
Corps of Engineers																			No Insignia					No Insignia	No Insignia				
Ordnance Department																								No Insignia	No Insignia				
Signal Corps																											No Insignia		
Cavalry																		No Insignia				No Insignia	No Insignia				No Insignia		
Artillery			No Insignia																No Insignia		No Insignia		No Insignia				No Insignia		
Infantry			No Insignia																No Insignia		No Insignia		No Insignia				No Insignia		
Military Academy Band																			No Insignia										
Indian Scouts																No Insignia	No Insignia										No Insignia		

On August 11, 1890, Indian scouts were given white chevrons with red stitching. Dress chevrons added red stitching around the lace.

On October 1, 1890, corporals and privates were eliminated from the Signal Corps and sergeants first class were added.

On October 10, 1890 a detachment that had been part of the artillery but was serving at the Military Academy was transferred to the Quartermaster's Department. Presumably they continued to wear red chevrons.

Sergeant Indian Scouts	Corporal Indian Scouts

== US Army Cloth Chevrons 1890 ==
	! class="nowrap ts-vertical-header " style="" | Sergeant Major	! class="nowrap ts-vertical-header " style="" | Quartermaster Sergeant	! class="nowrap ts-vertical-header " style="" | Chief Musician	! class="nowrap ts-vertical-header " style="" | Principal Musician	! class="nowrap ts-vertical-header " style="" | Saddler Sergeant	! class="nowrap ts-vertical-header " style="" | Chief Trumpeter	! class="nowrap ts-vertical-header " style="" | Ordnance Sergeant	! class="nowrap ts-vertical-header " style="" | Post Quartermaster Sergeant	Commissary Sergeant	Hospital Steward	! class="nowrap ts-vertical-header " style="" | Acting Hospital Steward	! class="nowrap ts-vertical-header " style="" | Battalion Sergeant Major	! class="nowrap ts-vertical-header " style="" | Battalion Quartermaster Sergeant	! class="nowrap ts-vertical-header " style="" | First Sergeant	! class="nowrap ts-vertical-header " style="" | Sergeant Serving as Color Sergeant	! class="nowrap ts-vertical-header " style="" | Sergeant First Class	Sergeant	! class="nowrap ts-vertical-header " style="" | Corporal	! class="nowrap ts-vertical-header " style="" | Trumpeter	! class="nowrap ts-vertical-header " style="" | Musician	! class="nowrap ts-vertical-header " style="" | Farriers and Blacksmith	! class="nowrap ts-vertical-header " style="" | Artificer	! class="nowrap ts-vertical-header " style="" | Saddler	! class="nowrap ts-vertical-header " style="" | Wagoner	Private First Class	! class="nowrap ts-vertical-header " style="" | Private Second Class	! class="nowrap ts-vertical-header " style="" | Private of the Hospital Corps	Private	! class="nowrap ts-vertical-header " style="" | General Service Clerk	! class="nowrap ts-vertical-header " style="" | General Service Messenger
General Service Clerks and Messengers																													No Insignia	No Insignia
Quartermaster's Department																														
Subsistence Department																														
Medical Department																											No Insignia			
Corps of Engineers																				No Insignia					No Insignia	No Insignia				
Ordnance Department																									No Insignia	No Insignia				
Signal Corps																														
Cavalry																			No Insignia				No Insignia	No Insignia				No Insignia		
Artillery			No Insignia																	No Insignia		No Insignia		No Insignia				No Insignia		
Infantry			No Insignia																	No Insignia		No Insignia		No Insignia				No Insignia		
Military Academy Detachment																				No Insignia										
Indian Scouts																												No Insignia		

On August 20, 1891, the chevrons for the Signal Corps were changed again to conventional black cloth with white stitching and dress chevrons were authorized with gold lace on black cloth. A torch and crossed flags were placed in the angle of the chevrons. Sergeants first class were given three chevrons and an arc.

Privates serving a trial period to see if they could be promoted to corporal, now as lance corporals, were allowed to wear one chevron.

Sergeant First Class Signal Corps	Sergeant Signal Corps

== US Army Cloth Chevrons 1891-1893 ==
	! class="nowrap ts-vertical-header " style="" | Sergeant Major	! class="nowrap ts-vertical-header " style="" | Quartermaster Sergeant	! class="nowrap ts-vertical-header " style="" | Chief Musician	! class="nowrap ts-vertical-header " style="" | Principal Musician	! class="nowrap ts-vertical-header " style="" | Saddler Sergeant	! class="nowrap ts-vertical-header " style="" | Chief Trumpeter	! class="nowrap ts-vertical-header " style="" | Ordnance Sergeant	! class="nowrap ts-vertical-header " style="" | Post Quartermaster Sergeant	Commissary Sergeant	Hospital Steward	! class="nowrap ts-vertical-header " style="" | Acting Hospital Steward	! class="nowrap ts-vertical-header " style="" | Battalion Sergeant Major	! class="nowrap ts-vertical-header " style="" | Battalion Quartermaster Sergeant	! class="nowrap ts-vertical-header " style="" | First Sergeant	! class="nowrap ts-vertical-header " style="" | Sergeant Serving as Color Sergeant	! class="nowrap ts-vertical-header " style="" | Sergeant First Class	Sergeant	! class="nowrap ts-vertical-header " style="" | Corporal	! class="nowrap ts-vertical-header " style="" | Trumpeter	! class="nowrap ts-vertical-header " style="" | Musician	! class="nowrap ts-vertical-header " style="" | Farriers and Blacksmith	! class="nowrap ts-vertical-header " style="" | Artificer	! class="nowrap ts-vertical-header " style="" | Saddler	! class="nowrap ts-vertical-header " style="" | Wagoner	! class="nowrap ts-vertical-header " style="" | Private Serving as Lance Corporal	Private First Class	! class="nowrap ts-vertical-header " style="" | Private Second Class	Private of the Hospital Corps	Private	! class="nowrap ts-vertical-header " style="" | General Service Clerk	! class="nowrap ts-vertical-header " style="" | General Service Messenger
General Service Clerks and Messengers																														No Insignia	No Insignia
Quartermaster's Department																															
Subsistence Department																															
Medical Department																												No Insignia			
Corps of Engineers																				No Insignia						No Insignia	No Insignia				
Ordnance Department																										No Insignia	No Insignia				
Signal Corps																															
Cavalry																			No Insignia				No Insignia	No Insignia					No Insignia		
Artillery			No Insignia																	No Insignia		No Insignia		No Insignia					No Insignia		
Infantry			No Insignia																	No Insignia		No Insignia		No Insignia					No Insignia		
Military Academy Detachment																				No Insignia											
Indian Scouts																				No Insignia									No Insignia		

On August 6, 1894, general service clerks and general service messengers were eliminated from the army.

== US Army Cloth Chevrons 1894 ==
	! class="nowrap ts-vertical-header " style="" | Sergeant Major	! class="nowrap ts-vertical-header " style="" | Quartermaster Sergeant	! class="nowrap ts-vertical-header " style="" | Chief Musician	! class="nowrap ts-vertical-header " style="" | Principal Musician	! class="nowrap ts-vertical-header " style="" | Saddler Sergeant	! class="nowrap ts-vertical-header " style="" | Chief Trumpeter	! class="nowrap ts-vertical-header " style="" | Ordnance Sergeant	! class="nowrap ts-vertical-header " style="" | Post Quartermaster Sergeant	Commissary Sergeant	Hospital Steward	! class="nowrap ts-vertical-header " style="" | Acting Hospital Steward	! class="nowrap ts-vertical-header " style="" | Battalion Sergeant Major	! class="nowrap ts-vertical-header " style="" | Battalion Quartermaster Sergeant	! class="nowrap ts-vertical-header " style="" | First Sergeant	! class="nowrap ts-vertical-header " style="" | Sergeant Serving as Color Sergeant	! class="nowrap ts-vertical-header " style="" | Sergeant First Class	Sergeant	! class="nowrap ts-vertical-header " style="" | Corporal	! class="nowrap ts-vertical-header " style="" | Trumpeter	! class="nowrap ts-vertical-header " style="" | Musician	! class="nowrap ts-vertical-header " style="" | Farriers and Blacksmith	! class="nowrap ts-vertical-header " style="" | Artificer	! class="nowrap ts-vertical-header " style="" | Saddler	! class="nowrap ts-vertical-header " style="" | Wagoner	! class="nowrap ts-vertical-header " style="" | Private Serving as Lance Corporal	Private First Class	! class="nowrap ts-vertical-header " style="" | Private Second Class	Private of the Hospital Corps	Private
Quartermaster's Department																													
Subsistence Department																													
Medical Department																												No Insignia	
Corps of Engineers																				No Insignia						No Insignia	No Insignia		
Ordnance Department																										No Insignia	No Insignia		
Signal Corps																													
Cavalry																			No Insignia				No Insignia	No Insignia					No Insignia
Artillery			No Insignia																	No Insignia		No Insignia		No Insignia					No Insignia
Infantry			No Insignia																	No Insignia		No Insignia		No Insignia					No Insignia
Military Academy Detachment																				No Insignia									
Indian Scouts																													No Insignia

Tables of organization for 1895 show both Indian scouts and Indian soldiers organized as cavalry.

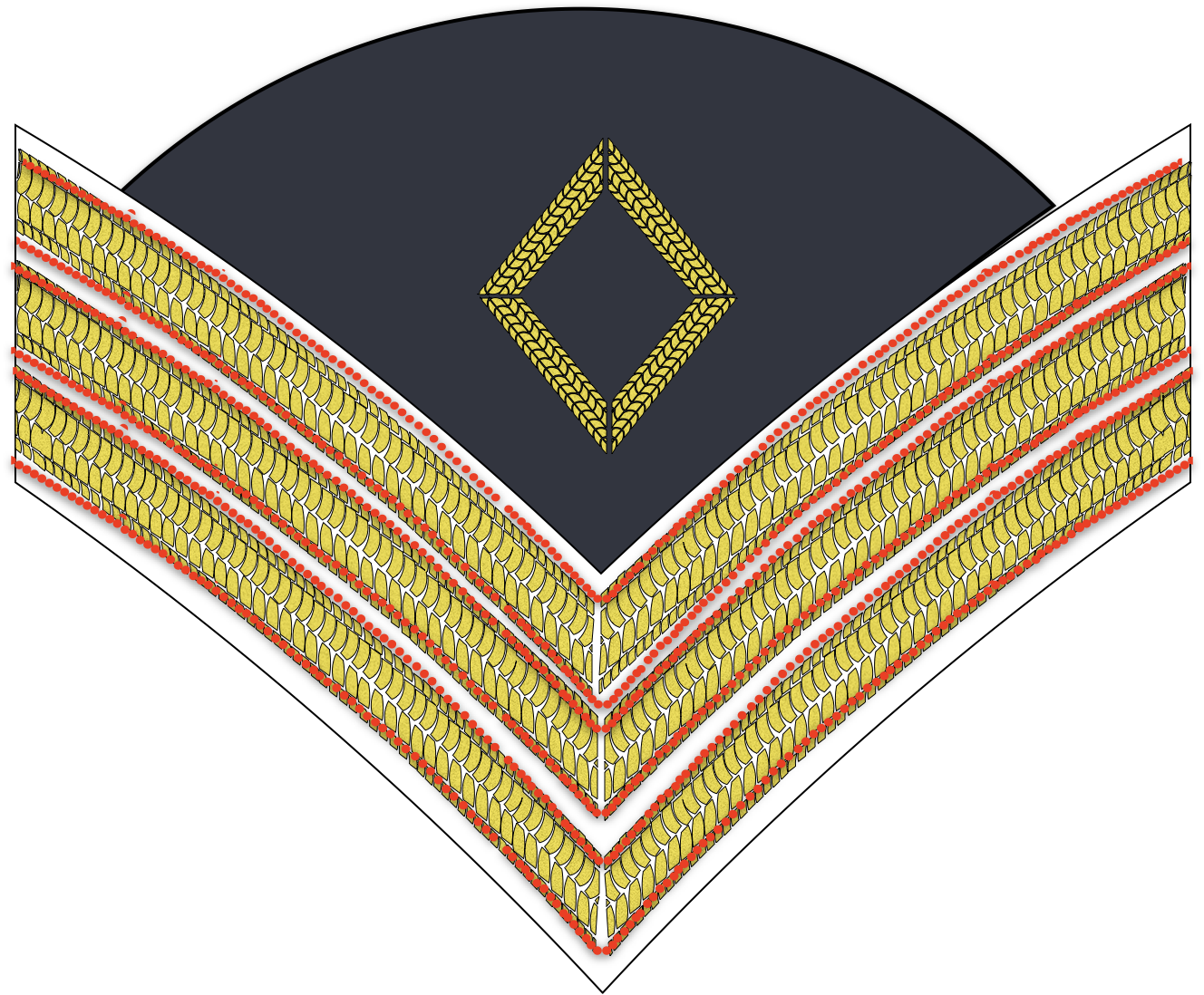

First Sergeant Indian Scouts

== US Army Cloth Chevrons 1895 ==
	! class="nowrap ts-vertical-header " style="" | Sergeant Major	! class="nowrap ts-vertical-header " style="" | Quartermaster Sergeant	! class="nowrap ts-vertical-header " style="" | Chief Musician	! class="nowrap ts-vertical-header " style="" | Principal Musician	! class="nowrap ts-vertical-header " style="" | Saddler Sergeant	! class="nowrap ts-vertical-header " style="" | Chief Trumpeter	! class="nowrap ts-vertical-header " style="" | Ordnance Sergeant	! class="nowrap ts-vertical-header " style="" | Post Quartermaster Sergeant	Commissary Sergeant	Hospital Steward	! class="nowrap ts-vertical-header " style="" | Acting Hospital Steward	! class="nowrap ts-vertical-header " style="" | Battalion Sergeant Major	! class="nowrap ts-vertical-header " style="" | Battalion Quartermaster Sergeant	! class="nowrap ts-vertical-header " style="" | First Sergeant	! class="nowrap ts-vertical-header " style="" | Sergeant Serving as Color Sergeant	! class="nowrap ts-vertical-header " style="" | Sergeant First Class	Sergeant	! class="nowrap ts-vertical-header " style="" | Corporal	! class="nowrap ts-vertical-header " style="" | Trumpeter	! class="nowrap ts-vertical-header " style="" | Musician	! class="nowrap ts-vertical-header " style="" | Farriers and Blacksmith	! class="nowrap ts-vertical-header " style="" | Artificer	! class="nowrap ts-vertical-header " style="" | Saddler	! class="nowrap ts-vertical-header " style="" | Wagoner	! class="nowrap ts-vertical-header " style="" | Private Serving as Lance Corporal	Private First Class	! class="nowrap ts-vertical-header " style="" | Private Second Class	Private of the Hospital Corps	Private
Quartermaster's Department																													
Subsistence Department																													
Medical Department																												No Insignia	
Corps of Engineers																				No Insignia						No Insignia	No Insignia		
Ordnance Department																										No Insignia	No Insignia		
Signal Corps																													
Cavalry																			No Insignia				No Insignia	No Insignia					No Insignia
Artillery			No Insignia																	No Insignia		No Insignia		No Insignia					No Insignia
Infantry			No Insignia																	No Insignia		No Insignia		No Insignia					No Insignia
Military Academy Detachment																				No Insignia									
Indian Scouts and Indian Soldiers																			No Insignia	No Insignia		No Insignia	No Insignia	No Insignia					No Insignia

Musicians and saddlers were eliminated from Indian scouts in 1896.

== US Army Cloth Chevrons 1896-1897 ==
	! class="nowrap ts-vertical-header " style="" | Sergeant Major	! class="nowrap ts-vertical-header " style="" | Quartermaster Sergeant	! class="nowrap ts-vertical-header " style="" | Chief Musician	! class="nowrap ts-vertical-header " style="" | Principal Musician	! class="nowrap ts-vertical-header " style="" | Saddler Sergeant	! class="nowrap ts-vertical-header " style="" | Chief Trumpeter	! class="nowrap ts-vertical-header " style="" | Ordnance Sergeant	! class="nowrap ts-vertical-header " style="" | Post Quartermaster Sergeant	Commissary Sergeant	Hospital Steward	! class="nowrap ts-vertical-header " style="" | Acting Hospital Steward	! class="nowrap ts-vertical-header " style="" | Battalion Sergeant Major	! class="nowrap ts-vertical-header " style="" | Battalion Quartermaster Sergeant	! class="nowrap ts-vertical-header " style="" | First Sergeant	! class="nowrap ts-vertical-header " style="" | Sergeant Serving as Color Sergeant	! class="nowrap ts-vertical-header " style="" | Sergeant First Class	Sergeant	! class="nowrap ts-vertical-header " style="" | Corporal	! class="nowrap ts-vertical-header " style="" | Trumpeter	! class="nowrap ts-vertical-header " style="" | Musician	! class="nowrap ts-vertical-header " style="" | Farriers and Blacksmith	! class="nowrap ts-vertical-header " style="" | Artificer	! class="nowrap ts-vertical-header " style="" | Saddler	! class="nowrap ts-vertical-header " style="" | Wagoner	! class="nowrap ts-vertical-header " style="" | Private Serving as Lance Corporal	Private First Class	! class="nowrap ts-vertical-header " style="" | Private Second Class	Private of the Hospital Corps	Private
Quartermaster's Department																													
Subsistence Department																													
Medical Department																												No Insignia	
Corps of Engineers																				No Insignia						No Insignia	No Insignia		
Ordnance Department																										No Insignia	No Insignia		
Signal Corps																													
Cavalry																			No Insignia				No Insignia	No Insignia					No Insignia
Artillery			No Insignia																	No Insignia		No Insignia		No Insignia					No Insignia
Infantry			No Insignia																	No Insignia		No Insignia		No Insignia					No Insignia
Military Academy Detachment																				No Insignia									
Indian Scouts and Indian Soldiers																			No Insignia	No Insignia				No Insignia					No Insignia

On March 8, 1898, saddlers and farriers and blacksmiths were added to the artillery.

On April 26, 1898, company level quartermaster sergeants returned to the infantry, cavalry and artillery. The artillery gained veterinary sergeants and the Corps of Engineers gained first sergeants. The Signal Corps gained corporals and privates were once again split into first and second class. Lance corporals were authorized.

On May 23, 1898, the color for the infantry was changed back to light blue on new khaki field uniforms. It is possible that enlisted men of the infantry wore light blue chevron on these uniforms. However the use of the khaki uniform by enlisted men at this time is unclear.

On June 3, 1898, dress uniforms and therefore dress chevrons were eliminated for enlisted men of the Medical Department.

On July 7, 1898, cooks were added to the infantry, cavalry, artillery and Signal Corps.

On July 23, 1898, three chevrons and one tie were once again prescribed for company level quartermaster sergeants, three chevrons and a horseshoe was prescribed for veterinary sergeants and crossed flags and a torch was prescribed for signal privates first class.

On July 25, 1898, chevrons were authorized to be worn on shirts.

Indian soldiers are no longer on the tables of organization beginning in 1898. Indian scouts are only listed as privates until 1909 when they are listed as just enlisted men. It appears that at least the noncommissioned officers were considered cavalry from this point on.

Company Quartermaster Sergeant Infantry	Battery Quartermaster Sergeant Artillery	Troop Quartermaster Sergeant Cavalry	Veterinary Sergeant Artillery	First Sergeant Corps of Engineers

== US Army Cloth Chevrons 1898 ==
	! class="nowrap ts-vertical-header " style="" | Sergeant Major	! class="nowrap ts-vertical-header " style="" | Quartermaster Sergeant	! class="nowrap ts-vertical-header " style="" | Chief Musician	! class="nowrap ts-vertical-header " style="" | Principal Musician	! class="nowrap ts-vertical-header " style="" | Saddler Sergeant	! class="nowrap ts-vertical-header " style="" | Chief Trumpeter	! class="nowrap ts-vertical-header " style="" | Ordnance Sergeant	! class="nowrap ts-vertical-header " style="" | Post Quartermaster Sergeant	Commissary Sergeant	Hospital Steward	! class="nowrap ts-vertical-header " style="" | Acting Hospital Steward	! class="nowrap ts-vertical-header " style="" | Battalion Sergeant Major	! class="nowrap ts-vertical-header " style="" | Battalion Quartermaster Sergeant	! class="nowrap ts-vertical-header " style="" | Veterinary Sergeant	! class="nowrap ts-vertical-header " style="" | First Sergeant	! class="nowrap ts-vertical-header " style="" | Company/Troop/Battery Quartermaster Sergeant	Sergeant Serving as Color Sergeant	! class="nowrap ts-vertical-header " style="" | Sergeant First Class	Sergeant	! class="nowrap ts-vertical-header " style="" | Corporal	! class="nowrap ts-vertical-header " style="" | Trumpeter	! class="nowrap ts-vertical-header " style="" | Cook	! class="nowrap ts-vertical-header " style="" | Musician	! class="nowrap ts-vertical-header " style="" | Farriers and Blacksmith	! class="nowrap ts-vertical-header " style="" | Artificer	! class="nowrap ts-vertical-header " style="" | Saddler	! class="nowrap ts-vertical-header " style="" | Wagoner	! class="nowrap ts-vertical-header " style="" | Private Serving as Lance Corporal	Private First Class	! class="nowrap ts-vertical-header " style="" | Private Second Class	Private of the Hospital Corps	Private
Quartermaster's Department																																
Subsistence Department																																
Medical Department																															No Insignia	
Corps of Engineers																							No Insignia						No Insignia	No Insignia		
Ordnance Department																													No Insignia	No Insignia		
Signal Corps																						No Insignia								No Insignia		
Cavalry																					No Insignia	No Insignia				No Insignia	No Insignia					No Insignia
Artillery			No Insignia																			No Insignia	No Insignia		No Insignia	No Insignia	No Insignia					No Insignia
Infantry			No Insignia																			No Insignia	No Insignia		No Insignia		No Insignia					No Insignia
Military Academy Detachment																							No Insignia									

On March 2, 1899, the ranks of saddler sergeant and veterinary sergeant were abolished. The title of commissary sergeant was changed to post commissary sergeant and regimental commissary sergeants were added to the infantry and cavalry. The artillery gained electrician sergeants, chief trumpeters and stable sergeants. The infantry gained battalion sergeants major and the cavalry squadron sergeants major. Drum majors were added to the infantry, cavalry and artillery. The cavalry gained principal musicians. Wagoners were removed from the infantry and artillery and farriers and blacksmiths of artillery were replaced with mechanics.

On April 24, 1899, chevrons were prescribed for the new ranks. Regimental commissary sergeants wore three chevrons, three ties and a crescent. Electrician sergeants wore three red, artillery chevrons but with white stitching and forked lightning in white. Battalion and squadron sergeants major wore three chevrons and two arcs and this now applied to the sergeant major of the engineer battalion. Drum majors wore three chevrons and crossed batons. Chief musicians were finally prescribed three chevrons two arcs and a bugle. No insignia was prescribed for stable sergeants. Cooks were given a cooks cap, saddlers a saddler's knife and both mechanics and artificers were prescribed crossed hammers.

On September 14, 1899, the chevrons on the khaki uniforms were clarified. They were to be the same as the cloth chevrons on blue uniforms with khaki inserts instead of blue. The color for the infantry was changed back to white.

Regimental Commissary Sergeant Infantry	Regimental Commissary Sergeant Cavalry	Electrician Sergeant Artillery	Battalion Sergeant Major Infantry	Battalion Sergeant Major Corps of Engineers	Squadron Sergeant Major Cavalry	Drum Major Infantry	Drum Major Artillery	Drum Major Cavalry	Chief Musician Infantry	Chief Musician Artillery	Chief Musician Cavalry

== US Army Cloth Chevrons 1899 ==
	! class="nowrap ts-vertical-header " style="" | Regimental Sergeant Major	! class="nowrap ts-vertical-header " style="" | Regimental Quartermaster Sergeant	! class="nowrap ts-vertical-header " style="" | Chief Musician	! class="nowrap ts-vertical-header " style="" | Principal Musician	! class="nowrap ts-vertical-header " style="" | Drum Major	! class="nowrap ts-vertical-header " style="" | Chief Trumpeter	! class="nowrap ts-vertical-header " style="" | Ordnance Sergeant	! class="nowrap ts-vertical-header " style="" | Post Quartermaster Sergeant	! class="nowrap ts-vertical-header " style="" | Post Commissary Sergeant	! class="nowrap ts-vertical-header " style="" | Regimental Commissary Sergeant	! class="nowrap ts-vertical-header " style="" | Hospital Steward	! class="nowrap ts-vertical-header " style="" | Acting Hospital Steward	! class="nowrap ts-vertical-header " style="" | Squadron and Battalion Sergeant Major	! class="nowrap ts-vertical-header " style="" | Battalion Quartermaster Sergeant	! class="nowrap ts-vertical-header " style="" | Electrician Sergeant	! class="nowrap ts-vertical-header " style="" | First Sergeant	! class="nowrap ts-vertical-header " style="" | Company/Troop/Battery Quartermaster Sergeant	Sergeant Serving as Color Sergeant	! class="nowrap ts-vertical-header " style="" | Stable Sergeant	! class="nowrap ts-vertical-header " style="" | Sergeant First Class	Sergeant	! class="nowrap ts-vertical-header " style="" | Corporal	! class="nowrap ts-vertical-header " style="" | Trumpeter	! class="nowrap ts-vertical-header " style="" | Cook	! class="nowrap ts-vertical-header " style="" | Musician	! class="nowrap ts-vertical-header " style="" | Farriers and Blacksmith	! class="nowrap ts-vertical-header " style="" | Mechanic	! class="nowrap ts-vertical-header " style="" | Artificer	! class="nowrap ts-vertical-header " style="" | Saddler	Wagoner	! class="nowrap ts-vertical-header " style="" | Private Serving as Lance Corporal	Private First Class	! class="nowrap ts-vertical-header " style="" | Private Second Class	Private of the Hospital Corps	Private
Quartermaster's Department																																			
Subsistence Department																																			
Medical Department																																		No Insignia	
Corps of Engineers																									No Insignia							No Insignia	No Insignia		
Ordnance Department																																No Insignia	No Insignia		
Signal Corps																																	No Insignia		
Cavalry																							No Insignia							No Insignia					No Insignia
Artillery																			No Insignia Prescribed						No Insignia										No Insignia
Infantry																									No Insignia										No Insignia
Military Academy Detachment																									No Insignia										

On January 6, 1900, the chevrons on infantry overcoats were changed from dark blue to white.

On June 6, 1900, the detachment at the Military Academy gained the ranks of first sergeant and cook.

On October 4, 1900, the academy detachment was ordered to wear buff colored chevrons.

First Sergeant USMA Detachment	Sergeant USMA Detachment	Corporal USMA Detachment

== US Army Cloth Chevrons 1900 ==
	! class="nowrap ts-vertical-header " style="" | Regimental Sergeant Major	! class="nowrap ts-vertical-header " style="" | Quartermaster Sergeant	! class="nowrap ts-vertical-header " style="" | Chief Musician	! class="nowrap ts-vertical-header " style="" | Principal Musician	! class="nowrap ts-vertical-header " style="" | Drum Major	! class="nowrap ts-vertical-header " style="" | Chief Trumpeter	! class="nowrap ts-vertical-header " style="" | Ordnance Sergeant	! class="nowrap ts-vertical-header " style="" | Post Quartermaster Sergeant	! class="nowrap ts-vertical-header " style="" | Post Commissary Sergeant	! class="nowrap ts-vertical-header " style="" | Regimental Commissary Sergeant	! class="nowrap ts-vertical-header " style="" | Hospital Steward	! class="nowrap ts-vertical-header " style="" | Acting Hospital Steward	! class="nowrap ts-vertical-header " style="" | Squadron and Battalion Sergeant Major	! class="nowrap ts-vertical-header " style="" | Battalion Quartermaster Sergeant	! class="nowrap ts-vertical-header " style="" | Electrician Sergeant	! class="nowrap ts-vertical-header " style="" | First Sergeant	! class="nowrap ts-vertical-header " style="" | Company/Troop/Battery Quartermaster Sergeant	Sergeant Serving as Color Sergeant	! class="nowrap ts-vertical-header " style="" | Stable Sergeant	! class="nowrap ts-vertical-header " style="" | Sergeant First Class	Sergeant	! class="nowrap ts-vertical-header " style="" | Corporal	! class="nowrap ts-vertical-header " style="" | Trumpeter	! class="nowrap ts-vertical-header " style="" | Cook	! class="nowrap ts-vertical-header " style="" | Musician	! class="nowrap ts-vertical-header " style="" | Farriers and Blacksmith	! class="nowrap ts-vertical-header " style="" | Mechanic	! class="nowrap ts-vertical-header " style="" | Artificer	! class="nowrap ts-vertical-header " style="" | Saddler	Wagoner	! class="nowrap ts-vertical-header " style="" | Private Serving as Lance Corporal	Private First Class	! class="nowrap ts-vertical-header " style="" | Private Second Class	Private of the Hospital Corps	Private
Quartermaster's Department																																			
Subsistence Department																																			
Medical Department																																		No Insignia	
Corps of Engineers																									No Insignia							No Insignia	No Insignia		
Ordnance Department																																No Insignia	No Insignia		
Signal Corps																																	No Insignia		
Cavalry																							No Insignia							No Insignia					No Insignia
Artillery																			No Insignia Prescribed						No Insignia										No Insignia
Infantry																									No Insignia										No Insignia
Military Academy Detachment																									No Insignia										

On February 2, 1901, the army underwent a major reorganization. Color sergeant became an official rank in the infantry and cavalry. The position was eliminated in the artillery and the Corps of Engineers. The artillery regiments were abolished and replaced with a Corps of Artillery. Regimental sergeants major of artillery became sergeants major senior grade and battalion sergeants major became sergeants major junior grade. The ranks of chief musician, principal musician, company quartermaster sergeant and cook were added to the Corps of Engineers.

On February 21, 1901, the red Geneva cross on the chevrons of hospital stewards was replaced with a Maltese cross in green with white piping and privates of the Hospital Corps wore the cross alone.

On February 25, 1901, the insignia for color sergeants was changed to three chevrons and a star. The same design that had been used by ordnance sergeants since 1851. Ordnance sergeants replaced the star with a bursting bomb. Stable sergeants were finally given insignia of three chevrons and a horse's head.

Battalion quartermaster sergeants of the Corps of Engineers were reduced to two ties.

On November 2, 1901, privates of the hospital corps were allowed a try out period to become acting hospital stewards with the title of lance acting hospital steward. During this period they were allowed to wear one chevron with the Maltese cross.

Chief Musician Corps of Engineers	Principal Musician Corps of Engineers	Battalion Quartermaster Sergeant Corps of Engineers	Company Quartermaster Sergeant Corps of Engineers	Color Sergeant Infantry	Color Sergeant Cavalry	Ordnance Sergeant

== US Army Cloth Chevrons 1901 ==
	! class="nowrap ts-vertical-header " style="" | Regimental Sergeant Major	! class="nowrap ts-vertical-header " style="" | Sergeant Major Senior Grade	! class="nowrap ts-vertical-header " style="" | Regimental Quartermaster Sergeant	! class="nowrap ts-vertical-header " style="" | Chief Musician	! class="nowrap ts-vertical-header " style="" | Principal Musician	Drum Major	! class="nowrap ts-vertical-header " style="" | Chief Trumpeter	! class="nowrap ts-vertical-header " style="" | Ordnance Sergeant	! class="nowrap ts-vertical-header " style="" | Post Quartermaster Sergeant	! class="nowrap ts-vertical-header " style="" | Post Commissary Sergeant	! class="nowrap ts-vertical-header " style="" | Regimental Commissary Sergeant	! class="nowrap ts-vertical-header " style="" | Hospital Steward	! class="nowrap ts-vertical-header " style="" | Acting Hospital Steward	! class="nowrap ts-vertical-header " style="" | Squadron and Battalion Sergeant Major	! class="nowrap ts-vertical-header " style="" | Sergeant Major Junior Grade	! class="nowrap ts-vertical-header " style="" | Battalion Quartermaster Sergeant	! class="nowrap ts-vertical-header " style="" | Electrician Sergeant	! class="nowrap ts-vertical-header " style="" | First Sergeant	! class="nowrap ts-vertical-header " style="" | Company/Troop/Battery Quartermaster Sergeant	! class="nowrap ts-vertical-header " style="" | Color Sergeant	! class="nowrap ts-vertical-header " style="" | Stable Sergeant	! class="nowrap ts-vertical-header " style="" | Sergeant First Class	! class="nowrap ts-vertical-header " style="" | Sergeant	! class="nowrap ts-vertical-header " style="" | Corporal	! class="nowrap ts-vertical-header " style="" | Trumpeter	! class="nowrap ts-vertical-header " style="" | Cook	! class="nowrap ts-vertical-header " style="" | Musician	! class="nowrap ts-vertical-header " style="" | Farriers and Blacksmith	! class="nowrap ts-vertical-header " style="" | Mechanic	! class="nowrap ts-vertical-header " style="" | Artificer	! class="nowrap ts-vertical-header " style="" | Saddler	! class="nowrap ts-vertical-header " style="" | Wagoner	! class="nowrap ts-vertical-header " style="" | Private Serving as Lance Corporal	! class="nowrap ts-vertical-header " style="" | Lance Acting Hospital Steward	! class="nowrap ts-vertical-header " style="" | Private First Class	! class="nowrap ts-vertical-header " style="" | Private Second Class	! class="nowrap ts-vertical-header " style="" | Private of the Hospital Corps	! class="nowrap ts-vertical-header " style="" | Private
Quartermaster's Department																																						
Subsistence Department																																						
Medical Department																																						
Corps of Engineers																											No Insignia								No Insignia	No Insignia		
Ordnance Department																																			No Insignia	No Insignia		
Signal Corps																																				No Insignia		
Cavalry																									No Insignia							No Insignia						No Insignia
Corps of Artillery																											No Insignia											No Insignia
Infantry																											No Insignia											No Insignia
Military Academy Detachment																											No Insignia											

On July 17, 1902, the army issued new uniform regulations with a new concept of chevrons. The new chevrons were much smaller and point up. This brought an end to this era of enlisted rank insignia.

== See also ==
- United States Army enlisted rank insignia 1902-1920
