= 8th Illinois Volunteer Regiment =

8th Illinois Volunteer Regiment may refer to the following units:

- 8th Illinois Infantry Regiment, an infantry regiment in the Civil War
- 8th Illinois Cavalry Regiment, a cavalry regiment in the Civil War
- 8th Illinois Infantry Regiment (National Guard), of the Spanish American War and World War I, when it became the United States' 370th Infantry Regiment
