= 63rd United States Colored Infantry Regiment =

- Active: November 19, 1863 - January 9, 1866
- Country: United States
- Allegiance: Union
- Branch: Infantry; United States Colored Troops
- Size: Regiment
- Engagements: American Civil War

Commanders
- Notable commanders: John Eaton

The 63rd Regiment United States Colored Troops, was a regiment of African-American troops recruited from Mississippi that served in the Union Army during the American Civil War. The regiment was originally organized as the 9th Louisiana Infantry (African Descent) in late 1863, renamed as the 63rd US Colored Infantry in March, 1864, and served as a garrison force along the Mississippi River until January, 1866.

== Organization ==
The regiment was initially organized in November-December 1863 as the 9th Louisiana Infantry (African Descent), replacing another unit of the same name that had been converted into an artillery regiment. Troops were recruited at Vicksburg, Mississippi, Goodrich's Landing, Louisiana, and Island Number Ten, Tennessee. The regiment's designation was changed to the 63rd Infantry, US Colored Troops on March 11, 1864.

== Service ==
Units of Black soldiers were assigned to garrison duties to hold strategic locations along the Mississippi River and free up veteran Union regiments for service elsewhere. General Henry Halleck wrote to Ulysses S. Grant in July 1863 expressing his opinion that the regiments of freshly-recruited Black troops would be suitable for this assignment: “The Mississippi should be the base of future operations east and west. When Port Hudson falls, the fortifications of that place, as well as of Vicksburg, should be so arranged as to be held by the smallest possible garrisons, thus leaving the mass of troops for operations in the field. I suggest that colored troops be used as far as possible in the garrisons." The companies of the 63rd Colored Infantry were assigned to guard various posts including Natchez, Mississippi, Vicksburg, Mississippi, Helena, Arkansas, Vidalia, Louisiana, and Memphis, Tennessee.

Recruiting standards for Black regiments raised along the Mississippi river were low, with many men impressed from the freed slave population and forced into the army. An inspection report from July 1864 detailed that the 63rd & 64th regiments contained "many useless soldiers, old, crippled, sick, and unserviceable poor condition". The inspecting officer reported that the stated intention of the commanding officers had been to form an "invalid corps" of Black soldiers not fit for regular service, similar to the Veteran Reserve Corps for white soldiers, but this effort had been marred by officers who used the 63rd & 64th regiments as a dumping ground for poor-quality soldiers from their regiments: "The officers report that they have new many men who are unfit for service. If the above idea is carried out no real service need by expected from the organization...The detachments are in bad condition and indifferently officered." Unlike the white Veteran Reserve Corps, some of the men of the 63rd and 64th Colored regiments were in such poor condition that they had been rejected by medical examiners, but were enrolled in the regiment anyway.

Despite this negative report, the 63rd did see combat on several occasions in 1864, fighting in small skirmishes with Confederate raiders at Waterproof, Louisiana, Ashwood's Landing, Louisiana, Camp Marengo, and Bullitt's Bayou, Louisiana. The regiment suffered 2 men wounded at Waterproof, 1 killed at Ashwood's Landing, and 1 killed at Camp Marengo.

John Eaton, the commander of the 63rd regiment, defended the service of his men, stating that rather than fighting famous battles, they performed the "humbler duty" of protecting freed slaves in Mississippi: "safeguarding the plantations from assaults which were often vindicative and particularly cruel, the task of protected the women and children, the aged and infirm, these were services which devolved upon men debarred by physical incapacity by their brothers."

The regiment was mustered out of service on January 9, 1866.

== Commanding officers ==
Commanding officers of the 63rd US Colored Infantry:

- Colonel John Eaton, promoted to brevet brigadier general, March 1865.
- Lieutenant Colonel Samuel Russell Thomas, promoted to colonel of the 64th Colored Infantry, January 1864.
- Lieutenant Colonel Albion L. Mitchell, resigned June 1865.

== See also ==
- List of United States Colored Troops Civil War units
