= The Invalid Corps =

American Civil War era song

The Invalid Corps is a popular song dating from the time of the American Civil War, circa 1863. The first stanza tells the story of a Union conscript attempting to join the military, only to be rejected because of his poor health. The rest of the song humorously depicts the rejected conscript's experience in the Invalid Corps. The words and music were composed by Frank Wilder.

The Invalid Corps was a branch of the military during the Civil War, created within the Union Army to allow partially disabled or formerly disabled soldiers to perform some form of light duty, thus allowing able soldiers to be sent to the front lines.

== Song lyrics ==
I wanted much to go to war,
And went to be examined;
The surgeon looked me o'er and o'er,
My back and chest he hammered.
Said he, "You're not the man for me,
Your lungs Are much affected,
And likewise both your eyes are cock'd,
And otherwise defected."

CHORUS
So, now I'm with the Invalids,
And cannot go and fight, sir!
The doctor told me so, you know,
Of course it must be right, sir!

While I was there a host of chaps
For reasons were exempted,
Old "pursy", he was laid aside,
To pass he had attempted.
The doctor said, "I do not like
Your corporosity, sir!
You'll "breed a famine" in the camp
Wherever you might be, sir!"

CHORUS

There came a fellow, mighty tall,
A "knock-kneed overgrowner",
The Doctor said, "I ain't got time
To take and look you over."
Next came along a little chap,
Who was 'bout two foot nothing,
The Doctor said, "You'd better go
And tell your marm you're coming!"

CHORUS

Some had the ticerdolerreou,
Some what they call "brown critters",
And some were "lank and lazy" too,
Some were too "fond of bitters".
Some had "cork legs" and some "one eye",
With backs deformed and crooked,
I'll bet you'd laugh'd till you had cried,
To see how "cute" they looked.

CHORUS
