= Hermann Lieb =

American lawyer

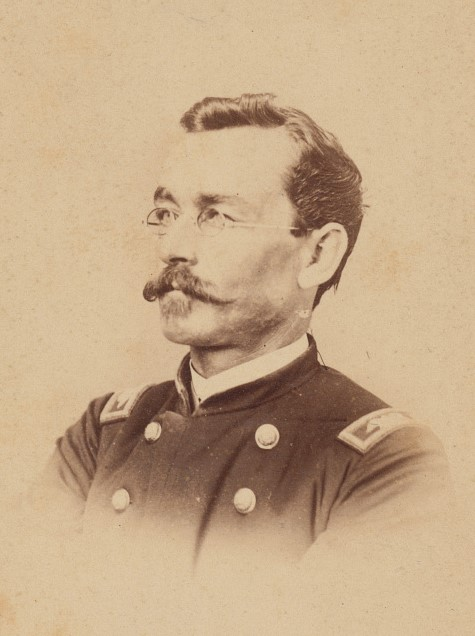
- Lieb during the Civil War

10th Clerk of Cook County
- In office 1873–1877
- Preceded by: Joseph Pollak
- Succeeded by: E.F.C. Klokke

Personal details
- Born: May 23, 1826 Ermatingen, Thurgau, Switzerland
- Died: March 5, 1908 (aged 81) Chicago, Illinois, United States

Military service
- Allegiance: United States; Union
- Branch/service: Union Army
- Years of service: 1861-1866
- Rank: Colonel; Brevet Brigadier General
- Commands: 9th Louisiana Infantry (African Descent); 5th U.S. Colored Heavy Artillery
- Battles/wars: American Civil War; Battle of Fort Donelson; Battle of Shiloh; Siege of Corinth; Battle of Milliken's Bend

Hermann Lieb (also known as Herman Lieb; May 23, 1826 – March 5, 1908) was a Swiss immigrant to the United States who served in the Union Army during the American Civil War. He is best remembered as the commander of the Union forces at the Battle of Milliken's Bend in 1863.

== Biography ==
Lieb was born in on May 23, 1826 in Ermatingen, Switzerland, to Sigmund Friedrich Lieb and Christine Vasmer, and was educated in Zürich, Vevey, and in France. In 1846 he moved to Paris, where he worked as a merchant, and there took part in the French Revolution of 1848. Lieb emigrated to the United States and settled in 1856 in Decatur, Illinois, where he began practicing law. He was also an editor of the Chicago Democrat.

=== American Civil War ===
At the outbreak of the war, he enlisted for ninety days as a private in Company B of the 8th Illinois Infantry. Upon reorganization of the regiment as a three-year unit in July 1861, Lieb was elected captain and the following year was promoted to major. He fought at the battles of Fort Donelson, Shiloh and the siege of Corinth.

On April 14, 1863 he was appointed colonel of the 9th Louisiana Regiment of African Descent. During the Vicksburg campaign Lieb commanded the post of Milliken's Bend along the Mississippi River. Here, on June 7, 1863, Lieb defeated Confederate forces under General Henry E. McCulloch and was wounded during the fighting. On August 7 his unit was converted into an artillery unit which eventually became the 5th U.S. Colored Heavy Artillery. With his regiment he performed garrison duty in the Vicksburg area for the remainder of 1863. On May 6, 1864, he was given command of the artillery forces of the Post of Vicksburg.

On March 13, 1865 Lieb was promoted to brevet brigadier general of U.S. Volunteers and was mustered out of the volunteer service on March 20, 1866.

=== After the war ===
Lieb returned to Illinois where he worked as a newspaper editor, postal worker and author. He was elected Clerk of Cook County in 1873. He also served as clerk of the County Court of Cook County. Lieb died in Chicago on March 5, 1908.
