= Samuel Russell Thomas =

- Born: April 27, 1840; South Point, Ohio, U.S.
- Died: January 11, 1903 (aged 62); New York City, New York, U.S.
- Occupations: Soldier, capitalist
- Spouse: Ann Augusta Porter (m. 1872)
- Children: Edward Russell Thomas; Harold Edgell Thomas; Eleanor Nancy Thomas

Samuel Russell Thomas (April 27, 1840 – January 11, 1903) was an American capitalist and Union Army general during the U.S. Civil War.

== Early life ==
Thomas was born on April 27, 1840, in South Point in Lawrence County, Ohio. He was a son of Captain James Thomas (d. 1842) and his wife, a daughter of Captain John Callihan, a War of 1812 soldier. His parents were originally from Virginia and were among the early settlers, in 1807, of the region between the Kanawha and Ohio Rivers.

== Career ==
After limited schooling in Marietta, he began his career as a junior clerk with the Keystone Iron Company in Jackson, Ohio, where he learned the engineering of mining.

=== U.S. Civil War ===
An ardent Republican upon the forming of the party, Thomas enlisted during the U.S. Civil War as a Second Lieutenant in the 27th Ohio Infantry of the Union Army in July 1861. For three years, he served under Col. John W. Fuller in the "Ohio Brigade" and was successively promoted "for gallant and meritorious" to Captain, Major, Lieutenant Colonel, and Colonel before being brevetted a Brigadier general. Thomas mostly participated in the south and west under Grant and Sherman during the War, including at the Battles of Pittsburg Landing, Chattanooga and Vicksburg. He was known for leading the first black Union troops, the 63rd and 64th United States Colored Infantry, into battle.

Thomas was in the rear with the reserve forces during General Sherman's March to the Sea. For one year after the war during the Reconstruction era, he was in charge of the Freedman's and Abandoned Land and Property Departments in Mississippi. He was an Adjutant General on the staff of Oliver Otis Howard until January 1867 when he was honorably mustered out of the army.

=== Later career ===
After the war, he moved to Zanesville, Ohio, and entered the industrial sector, first as a pig iron and railroad supplies manufacturer. In 1869, he moved into coal mining when the Hocking Valley coal mines opened, and eventually moved into railroads in 1878. He began constructing railroads in Indiana, Ohio, Illinois, Nebraska, Tennessee, Georgia, and Alabama. From 1878 until March 1882, he variously served as vice president and president of the Creek Valley Railroad, a director and general manager of the New York, Chicago and St. Louis Railroad (known as the Nickel Plate Road). Beginning in 1882, he served as the president of the East Tennessee, Virginia and Georgia Railway Company and was a director of the Lake Erie and Western Railroad, the Duluth, South Shore and Atlantic Railway, and the Marquette, Houghton and Ontonagon Railroad, the Memphis and Charleston Railroad, and the Richmond and Danville Railroad, the latter two later became the Southern Railway.

== Personal life ==
In September 1872, Thomas was married to Ann Augusta Porter (1847–1944), a daughter of Carson Porter, a prominent citizen of Zanesville. Together, they were the parents of the following children:

- Edward Russell Thomas (1873–1926), a banker and owner of the New York Morning Telegraph, who married three times, first to Linda Lee Thomas, then to Elizabeth Finley, and lastly, to actress Lucy Cotton.
- Harold Edgell Thomas, a physician who married a widow, Ada Blande, to his father's dismay.
- Eleanor Nancy Thomas (1878–1920), who married Robert Livingston Beeckman, the Governor of Rhode Island from 1915 to 1921.

He was a member of the New York Yacht Club, the Riding Club, the Southern Club, the Union League Club, the Country Club, the Ohio Club, the Lotos Club, the Lawyers' Club and the Jekyl Island Club.

Thomas died of heart disease at his home, 17 West 57th Street in New York City, on January 11, 1903. He was interred in a mausoleum at Sleepy Hollow Cemetery in North Tarrytown (now Sleepy Hollow, New York). A mournful statue, Recueillement (also known as Bronze Lady) at the door of his mausoleum, commissioned by his widow from the noted sculptor Andrew O'Connor, is a popular landmark of the cemetery.

At his death, his estate was estimated to be $10,000,000 (equivalent to $349,962,963 today). His executors (including George Macculloch Miller) were instructed to invest $100,000 (equivalent to $3,499,630 today) and pay the income to his son Harold because in his will, Thomas stated: "I make no further provision for my son Harold because his condition, mentally and physically, is such that he is incapable of managing his own affairs." Upon his widow's death in 1944, she left her estate to son Dr. Harold E. Thomas, and not to her late son Edward's children Samuel and Lucetta, "because, in my opinion, each of them is adequately provide for financially".

== Legacy ==
Thomasville, Alabama is named after him.
