= Memphis Post =

Defunct newspaper

Memphis Daily Post
- Type: Daily newspaper
- Publisher: John Eaton
- Founded: January 1866
- Political alignment: Republican
- Ceased publication: September 11, 1869

The Memphis Daily Post was an African American daily newspaper that reported on the lives of freedmen in Memphis, Tennessee, after the American Civil War.

== History ==
The newspaper was founded by John Eaton, former Superintendent for Negro Affairs in the Department of the Tennessee, and began publication in January 1866. John Eaton was the chief editor and his brother Lucian worked as assistant editor. The paper was unable to receive high advertising revenue due to its support for civil rights and most of its subscribers were poor, so it discontinued publication after four years. In its four years of publication, the newspaper's name was changed four times. From January 15, 1866, to February 10, 1866, the newspaper was published as the Memphis Morning Post. From February 11, 1866, to February 25, 1866, the paper was published as the Memphis Post. For a majority of its publication from February 27, 1866, to April 25, 1868, it was published as the Memphis Daily Post. It was called the Memphis Evening Post from April 27, 1868, to September 11, 1869, when it ceased publication.

The paper was moderately Republican and was focused on equality. The paper offered support for the Alaska Purchase, stating that it would allow the United States to grow its commerce in the Pacific.

== Weekly ==
From February 17, 1866, to December 23, 1869, Eaton published a weekly version of the paper called the Memphis Weekly Post.
