= Elsie Eaton Newton =

American educator

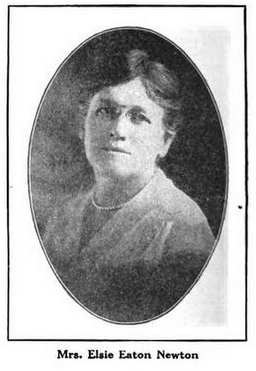
- Born: Elsie Eaton; February 6, 1871; Washington, D.C.
- Died: January 12, 1941 (aged 69); Warner, New Hampshire
- Occupation(s): educator, college administrator
- Known for: Work with US Indian Service, YWCA; Dean of Women, Marietta College
- Parent: John Eaton Jr.

Elsie Eaton Newton (February 6, 1871 – January 12, 1941) was an American educator with the United States Indian Service, and the first Dean of Women at Marietta College in Ohio.

== Early life ==
Elsie Eaton was born February 6, 1871, in Washington, D.C., the daughter of General John Eaton Jr. and Alice Eugenia Shirley Eaton. She graduated from Lake Erie Seminary. Later in life, she graduated from Marietta College in Ohio.

== Career ==
Elsie Eaton Newton was a health and education supervisor at the United States Indian Service before World War I. She wrote articles, spoke at conferences, and gave reports on prevention measures against contagious diseases such as tuberculosis and trachoma at reservations and federal schools. She served on the War Work Council of the YWCA during World War I, advising on health outreach and recreational programs for Native American girls.

Newton was a member of the National Association for the Study and Prevention of Tuberculosis, the National Association for the Study and Prevention of Infant Mortality, the National Association of Women Deans and Counselors, and the American Child Hygiene Association, and a charter member of the Toledo, Ohio, chapter of Sorosis.

From 1919 to 1922, Newton was assistant to the Dean of Women at Cornell University. In 1924 she was named first Dean of Women at Marietta College, an office she held until 1929. A women's residence hall at that school is named in her memory.

== Personal life and legacy ==
Elsie Eaton married Charles William Newton, a medical doctor from Ohio, in 1894; they had two daughters, Janet and Mary Alice, before he died in 1904. Elsie Eaton Newton died January 12, 1941, aged 69 years, in Warner, New Hampshire. In 1957, a portrait of Newton was donated to Marietta College by her elder daughter, Janet Newton Dawes.
