= 8th Illinois Infantry Regiment =

- Illinois flag
- Active: April 25, 1861, to May 4, 1866
- Country: United States
- Allegiance: Union
- Branch: United States Army; Union Army
- Type: Infantry
- Engagements: Battle of Fort Henry; Battle of Fort Donelson; Battle of Shiloh; Siege of Corinth; Battle of Thompson's Station; Battle of Port Gibson; Battle of Raymond; Battle of Champion Hill; Siege of Vicksburg

Commanders
- Notable commanders: Col. Richard J. Oglesby

Insignia
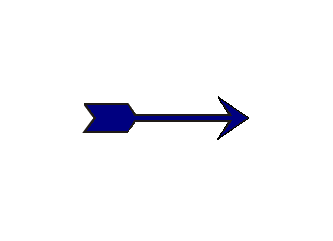
- 3rd Division, XVII Corps

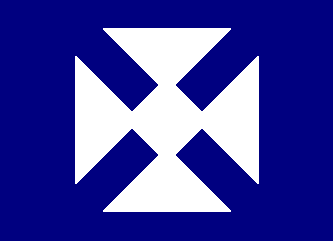
- 2nd Division, XIX Corps

The 8th Illinois Infantry Regiment was an infantry regiment that served in the Union Army during the American Civil War.

== Service ==
=== Initial 3-month service ===
The infantry regiment was organized at Springfield, Illinois, and mustered in on April 25, 1861, for a three-month service. The regiment was transferred to Cairo, Illinois, for duty until July 1861. Companies' "B" and "C" formed part of an expedition from Cairo to Little River on June 22 and 23rd. By the time the regiment was mustered out on July 25, 1861, they had lost three to disease.

=== 3-year enlistments ===
The regiment was reorganized with 3-year enlistees at Cairo, Illinois, on July 25, 1861. The 8th Illinois saw action at the Battle of Fort Henry, the Battle of Fort Donelson, the Battle of Shiloh, the Siege of Corinth, the Vicksburg Campaign, and the Mobile Campaign.

The regiment was mustered out of service on May 4, 1866, at Baton Rouge, Louisiana. Among the notables that served in the regiment was the regimental commander, Colonel Richard J. Oglesby who later served three terms as Illinois Governor, and Major Hermann Lieb, who later commanded the Union forces at the Battle of Milliken's Bend. Earl Dennison Thomas, who served as a drummer before enlisting at age 15 in 1862, advanced to regimental sergeant major, graduated from the United States Military Academy in 1869, and retired as a brigadier general in 1911.

== Affiliations, battle honors, detailed service, and casualties ==
=== Organizational affiliation ===
The three-month 8th Illinois Volunteer Infantry Regiment was organized at Springfield, IL and served in the Department of the Missouri. The three-year 8th Illinois Volunteer Infantry Regiment was organized at Cairo, IL and served with the following organizations:

- District of Cairo to October, 1861
- 1st Brigade, 1st Division, District of Cairo, to February, 1862
- 1st Brigade, 1st Division, District of West Tennessee, and Army of the Tennessee (AoT), to July, 1862
- 1st Brigade, 1st Division, District of Jackson, Department of the Tennessee (DoT), to September, 1862
- 4th Brigade, 1st Division, District of Jackson, to November, 1862
- 4th Brigade, 3rd Division, Right Wing, XIII Corps (Old), DoT, to December, 1862
- 3rd Brigade, 3rd Division, XVII Corps, AoT, to April, 1864
- Maltby's Brigade, District of Vicksburg, MS, to August, 1864
- 1st Brigade, 2nd Division, XIX Corps, Department of the Gulf, to December, 1864
- 2nd Brigade, Reserve Division, Military Division "West Mississippi (MDWM), to February, 1865
- 2nd Brigade, 1st Division Reserve Corps, MDWM, February, 1865
- 2nd Brigade, 1st Division, XIII Corps (New), MDWM, to June, 1865
- Department of Louisiana to May, 1866

=== Battles ===
The 8th Illinois fought in the following battles:

- Battle of Fort Henry
- Battle of Fort Donelson
- Battle of Shiloh
- Siege of Corinth
- Battle of Thompson's Station
- Battle of Port Gibson
- Battle of Raymond
- Battle of Champion Hill
- Siege of Vicksburg

=== Detailed service ===
The regiment's detailed service and locations are as follows:

==== 1861 ====
- Duty at Cairo, IL, till July - 3 mos. regt.
- Expedition from Cairo to Little River June 22–23 (Cos. "B" and "C") - 3 mos. regt.
- Mustered out July 25, 1861, expiration of term - 3 mos. regt.
- Moved to Cairo, IL, till October, 1861 - 3 yr. regt. from here
- Moved to Bird's Point, MO, and duty there till February 1862
- Expedition against Thompson's forces November 2–12
- Expeditions toward Columbus, KY, January 13–20, 1862.

==== 1862 ====
- Advance on Fort Henry, Tenn., February 2–6
- Investment and capture of Fort Donelson, TN, February 12–16
- Moved to Pittsburg Landing, TN, March 6–13
- Battle of Shiloh April 6–7
- Advance on and siege of Corinth, MS, April 29-May 30
- Moved to Bethel June 4–6
- Thence to Jackson June 15
- Duty there and guard duty at Toone's and Medon Stations till October
- Grant's Central Mississippi Campaign October 31, 1862, to January 10, 1863
- Ordered to Lagrange November, 1862
- Reconnoissance from Lagrange November 8–9

==== 1863 ====
- March to Grand Junction January 4–9,
- To Memphis, Tenn., January 12–19
- Moved to Lake Providence, LA, February 22
- Duty there till April
- Moved to Milliken's Bend, LA, April 12
- Movement on Bruinsburg and turning Grand Gulf April 25–30
- Battles of Thompson's Hill, Port Gibson, May 1
- South Fork Bayou Pierrie May 2
- Raymond May 12. Jackson, MS, May 14
- Champion's Hill May 16
- Siege of Vicksburg, MS, May 18-July 4
- Assaults on Vicksburg May 19 and 22
- Surrender of Vicksburg July 4
- Garrison duty at Vicksburg till July, 1864
- Stevenson's Expedition from Vicksburg to Monroe, LA, August 20-September 2
- Expedition to Canton, October 14–20
- Bogue Chitto Creek October 17

==== 1864 ====
- Meridian Campaign February 3-March 5
- Regiment Veteranize March 24
- Expedition to Pearl River, MS, July 2–10
- Jackson July 7
- Expedition to Morganza, LA, July 29-September 3
- Moved to mouth of White River September 3–8
- Duty there till October 18
- Movement to Memphis, TN, and return October 18–30
- Moved to Duvall's Bluff November 9
- Thence to Memphis, Tenn., November 28
- March to Moscow and return December 29–31

==== 1865 ====
- Moved to New Orleans, LA, January 1–4
- Campaign against Mobile and its defences February to April
- Siege of Spanish Fort and Fort Blakely March 26-April 8
- Assault and capture of Fort Blakely April 9
- Occupation of Mobile April 12
- Duty at Mobile till May 27
- Moved to New Orleans, LA, thence to Shreveport May 27-June 9
- Moved to Marshall, Texas, and duty there till September
- At Alexandria, La., till April, 1866

==== 1866 ====
- Mustered out at Baton Rouge May 4
- Discharged at Springfield, IL, May 13, 1866.

=== Total strength and casualties ===
The regiment suffered 6 officers and 160 enlisted men killed in action or died of wounds and 155 enlisted men who died of disease, for a total of 321 fatalities.

== Commanders ==
- Colonel Richard J. Oglesby - promoted to brigadier general April 1, 1862
- Colonel Frank L. Rhoades - resigned October 7, 1862
- Colonel John P. Post - resigned September 28, 1863
- Colonel Josiah A. Sheetz - mustered out with the regiment

== See also ==
- List of Illinois Civil War Units
- Illinois in the American Civil War
