= John Eaton (educator) =

Union Army general and United States Commissioner of Education

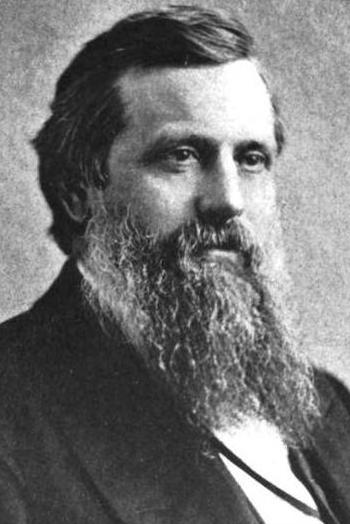
- Frontispiece of 1907's Grant, Lincoln, and the Freedmen: Reminiscences of the Civil War

United States Commissioner of Education
- In office March 16, 1870 – August 5, 1886
- President: Ulysses Grant; Rutherford Hayes; James Garfield; Chester Arthur; Grover Cleveland
- Preceded by: Henry Barnard
- Succeeded by: Nathaniel Dawson

Personal details
- Born: December 5, 1829 Sutton, New Hampshire, U.S.
- Died: February 9, 1906 (aged 76) Washington, D.C., U.S.
- Education: Dartmouth College (BA); Rutgers University, New Brunswick (AM, LLD)
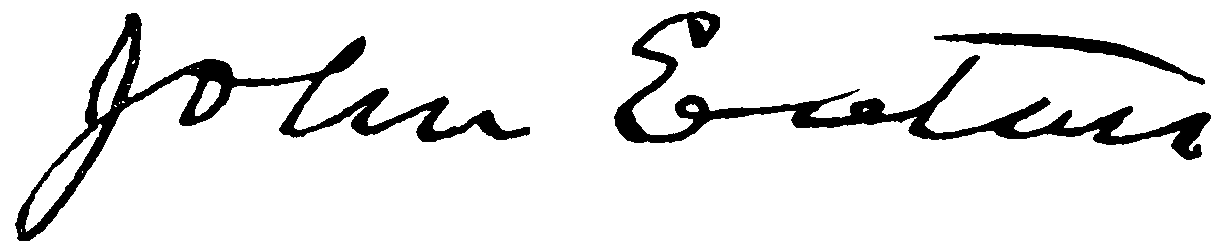
- Signature

Military service
- Allegiance: United States • Union
- Branch/service: Union Army
- Rank: Colonel; Bvt. Brigadier General
- Unit: 27th Ohio Infantry
- Commands: 63rd U.S. Colored Infantry
- Battles/wars: American Civil War

John Eaton, Jr. (December 5, 1829 – February 9, 1906) was an American educator who served as the U.S. commissioner of Education and a Union Army colonel during the American Civil War. On March 12, 1866, the United States Senate confirmed his January 13, 1866 nomination for appointment to the grade of brevet brigadier general of volunteers to rank from March 13, 1865.

== Early life and education ==
Eaton was born in Sutton, New Hampshire, and attended Thetford Academy in Vermont. He was the eldest of nine children and his father was a farmer. He graduated from Dartmouth College in 1854, studied at Andover Theological Seminary, and was ordained in 1862 to the Presbyterian ministry. He had to teach all four years he was in college in order to pay his board and tuition. He received a Master of Arts and Legum Doctor from Rutgers University.

== Career ==
=== Civil War ===
Eaton entered the American Civil War as a chaplain of the 27th Ohio Volunteer Infantry on August 15, 1861.

During the Siege of Vicksburg, Eaton was in possession of some letters from his brother's in-law family, the Shirleys of Goffstown, New Hampshire. He was to deliver them to the Shirleys of Vicksburg, as the two Shirley patriarchs were brothers. He found the Shirley house intact, as the one remaining house on the battlefield that had not been burned. The house had been saved by the heroic actions of Adeline Quincy Shirley, who stayed in the house and dared the rebels to burn it down with her inside. When a Confederate soldier came to do just that, he was shot and killed by the pursuing vanguard.

In the aftermath of the siege, Eaton found and befriended the Shirley family, who had been hiding in a nearby cave. He helped them find a different house to live in, as their house had become Grant's headquarters for the siege. It was there he met his future wife, Alice Shirley, the daughter of Adeline, who would later donate their land to be incorporated into the Vicksburg National Military Park, where the house still stands and Adeline and her husband James are buried.

In November 1862, after Lincoln's preliminary Emancipation Proclamation, Major General Ulysses S. Grant appointed Eaton superintendent of freedmen. He was later given supervision of all military posts from Cairo to Natchez and Fort Smith. In November 1863, Grant appointed him as the superintendent of Negro Affairs for the Department of the Tennessee; there, Eaton supervised the establishment of 74 schools. On October 10, 1863, Eaton was made colonel of the 63rd United States Colored Infantry. On January 13, 1866, President Andrew Johnson nominated Eaton for appointment to the grade of brevet brigadier general of volunteers, to rank from March 13, 1865, and the United States Senate confirmed the appointment on March 12, 1866.

=== Postwar career ===
Eaton left the military and eventually returned to his career in education. He remained with the freedman bureau until he was discharged on December 18, 1865, and then became editor of the Memphis Daily Post in 1866. From 1867 to 1869 he was the state superintendent of schools of Tennessee. He was then appointed United States Commissioner of Education in 1870. He served with efficiency in the United States Bureau of Education where he, among other things, organized Washington, D.C.'s Board of Education and reorganized the Bureau of Refugees, Freedmen and Abandoned Lands.

From 1886 to 1891, Eaton was president of Marietta College, and, in 1895, he was appointed president of Sheldon Jackson College in Sitka, Alaska. In 1898, he became inspector of education in Puerto Rico and played a role in the centralization of its educational system. At the same time, he was the president of Westminster College in Salt Lake City. He also served as councillor of the American Public Health Association, vice president of the American Association for the Advancement of Science, and president of the Association of Social Science. He was a representative of the Interior Department at the centennial exposition and the organizer of the educational exhibit at New Orleans. He was president of the National Congress of Education and of the American Society of Religious Education.

Eaton wrote a history of Thetford Academy, Mormons of Today, The Freedmen in the War, Schools of Tennessee, and several reports, addresses, and magazine articles.

== Personal life ==
After several years of failing health, Eaton took ill on February 8, 1906, and died one day later in his apartment in the Concord Flats in Washington, D.C. He was buried in Arlington National Cemetery.

Four years later, John Eaton Elementary School was named for him.

Eaton's daughter, Elsie Eaton Newton (1871–1941), was an educator associated with the United States Indian Service, and later served as the first dean of women at Marietta College.

== See also ==
- List of American Civil War brevet generals (Union)

== Notes ==
Political offices
Preceded by Henry Barnard	United States Commissioner of Education; 1870–1886	Succeeded by Nathaniel Dawson
