= Veteran Reserve Corps =

American Civil War military reserve organization

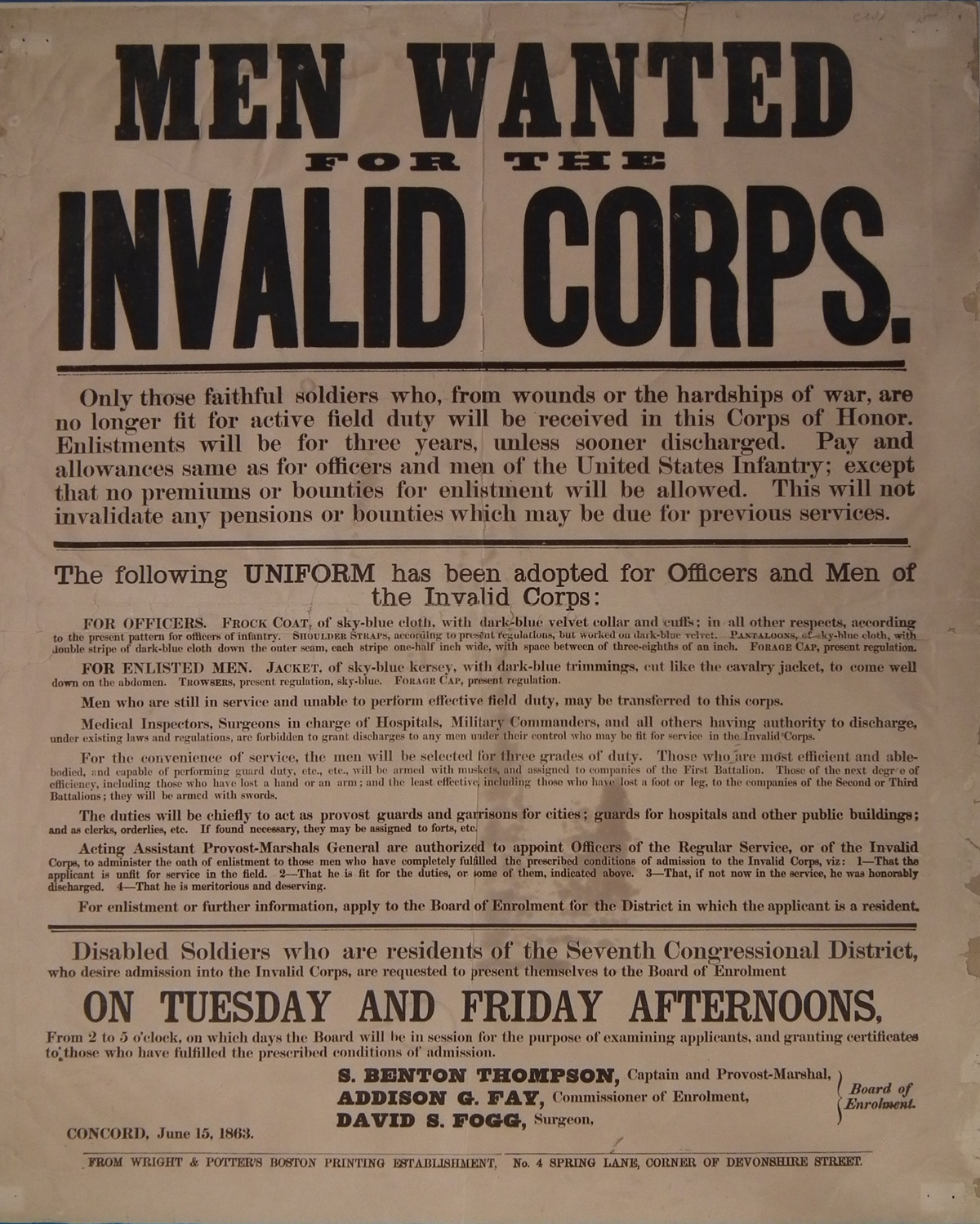
Men Wanted for the Invalid Corps notice, 1863

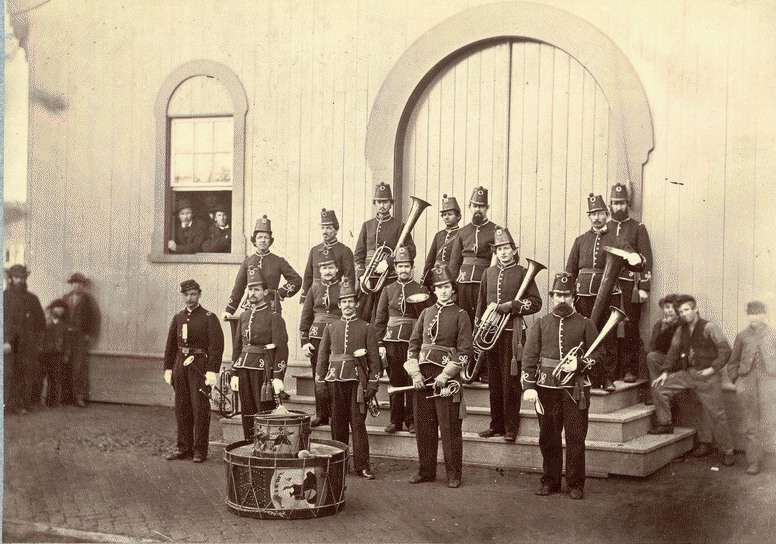
10th VRC band in Washington, 1865

The Veteran Reserve Corps (originally the Invalid Corps) was a military reserve organization created within the Union Army during the American Civil War to allow partially disabled or otherwise infirm soldiers (or former soldiers) to perform light duty, freeing non-disabled soldiers to serve on the front lines.

== The Invalid Corps ==
The corps was organized under authority of General Order No. 105, U.S. War Department, dated April 28, 1863. A similar corps had existed in Revolutionary times between 1777 and 1783. The Invalid Corps of the Civil War period was created to make suitable use in a military or semi-military capacity of soldiers who had been rendered unfit for active field service on account of wounds or disease contracted in line of duty, but who were still fit for garrison or other light duty, and were, in the opinion of their commanding officers, meritorious and deserving.

=== Qualifications ===
Those serving in the Invalid Corps were divided into two classes:

- Class 1, partially disabled soldiers whose periods of service had not yet expired, and who were transferred directly to the Corps, there to complete their terms of enlistment;
- Class 2, soldiers who had been discharged from the service on account of wounds, disease, or other disabilities, but who were yet able to perform light military duty and desired to do so.

As the war went on, it proved that the additions to the Corps hardly equaled the losses by discharge or otherwise, so it was finally ordered that the men who had had two years of honorable service in the Union Army or Marine Corps might enlist in the Invalid Corps without regard to disability.

The soldiers shown in the rosters of the 15th Massachusetts Volunteer Infantry Regiment (where they originally enlisted) and who then transferred to the V. R. C. belong to Class 1.

== The Veteran Reserve Corps ==
The title "Veteran Reserve Corps" was substituted for that of "Invalid Corps" by General Order No. 111, dated March 18, 1864, to boost the morale as the same initials "I.C." were stamped on condemned property meaning, "Inspected-Condemned". The men serving in the Veteran Reserve Corps were organized into two battalions; the First Battalion including those whose disabilities were comparatively slight and who were still able to handle a musket and do some marching, also to perform guard or provost duty. The Second Battalion was made up of men whose disabilities were more serious, who had perhaps lost limbs or suffered some other grave injury. These latter were commonly employed as cooks, orderlies, nurses, or guards in public buildings.

== Uniforms ==
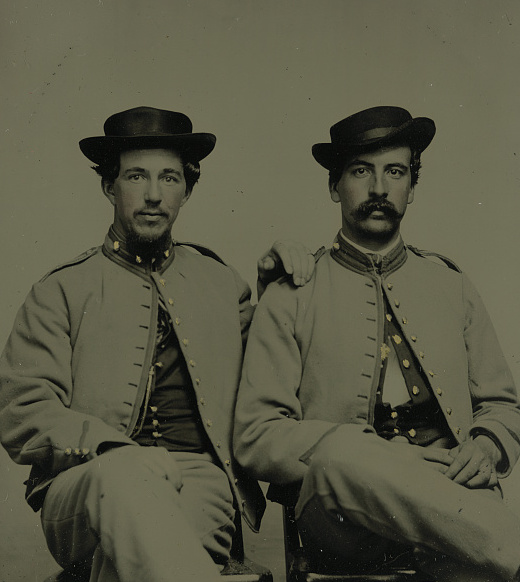
Private William Liming of Co. B, 21st U.S. Veteran Reserve Corps Infantry Regiment, and unidentified soldier

Invalid Corps members stood out because of their unique uniforms. According to General Orders No. 124, issued May 15, 1863,

The following uniform has been adopted for the Invalid Corps: Jacket: Of sky-blue kersey, with dark-blue trimmings, cut like the jacket of the U.S. Cavalry, to come well down on the loins and abdomen. Trousers: Present regulation, sky-blue. Forage cap: Present regulation.

The uniform was trimmed in dark blue, with chevrons of rank and the background of officer's shoulder insignia having that color as a backing.

Invalid Corps troops also wore standard dark blue fatigue blouses from time to time. Standard forage caps were to be decorated with the brass infantry horn, regimental number, and company letter.

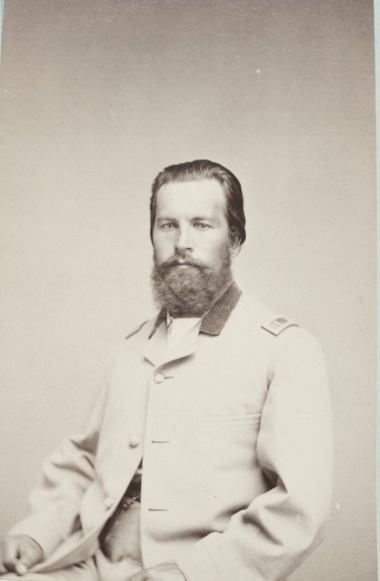
Captain Emil D. Munch, a Minnesota veteran of the 1st Minnesota Light Artillery Battery in a Veteran Reserve Corps officer's fatigue blouse

Officers also wore sky blue; a frock coat of sky-blue cloth, with dark blue velvet collar and cuffs, in all other respects according to the present pattern for officers of infantry. Shoulder straps were also to match current patterns but dark-blue velvet. Officers also wore gold epaulets on parade. Eventually officers were allowed to wear the standard dark-blue frock, ostensibly because sky-blue frocks soiled easily. Some officers had their frocks cut down to make uniforms or shell jackets. By the war's end, however, the army was still making sky-blue officers' frocks.

== Organization ==
There were twenty-four regiments in the Corps. These regiments were organized into one division and three brigades. In the beginning, each regiment was made up of six companies of the First Battalion and four of the Second Battalion, but in the latter part of the war, this method of organization was not strictly adhered to. The 18th Regiment, for example, which rendered exceptionally good service in Virginia at Belle Plain, Port Royal, and White House Landing in the spring and early summer of 1864, and in or near Washington DC in the latter part of the summer and through the fall of that year, was made up of only six Second Battalion companies.

There were from two to three times as many men in the First Battalion as in the Second, and the soldiers in the First Battalion performed a wide variety of duties. They furnished guards for the Union prison camps at Johnson's Island, Ohio, Elmira, New York, Point Lookout, Maryland, and elsewhere. They furnished details to the provost marshals to arrest bounty jumpers and to enforce the draft. They escorted substitutes, recruits, and prisoners to and from the front. They guarded railroads, did patrol duty in Washington DC, and even manned the defenses of the city during Jubal Early's raid against Fort Stevens in July 1864.

During the war, more than 60,000 men served in the Corps in the Union army; 1,700 soldiers during the service in the Federal Veteran Reserve Corps, of whom 24 died in action. Several thousand also served in a Confederate counterpart, the Southern Invalid Corps, although it was never officially organized into actual battalions.

Four members from Company F of the Fourteenth Veteran Reserves conducted the execution of the four conspirators linked to the assassination of Abraham Lincoln on July 7, 1865, at Fort McNair in Washington, D.C. They knocked out the post that released the platform that hanged Mary Surratt, Lewis Powell, David Herold, and George Atzerodt.

The Federal corps was mostly disbanded in 1866 following the close of the Civil War and the lessening of a need for reserve troops. The reorganization of the Regular Army in July 1866 provided for four regiments of the Veteran Reserve Corps. The Veteran Reserve Corps completely ceased to exist when these regiments were consolidated with other regiments in the Army's next re-organization in March 1869.

== See also ==
- The Invalid Corps, a humorous song written about the Veteran Reserve Corps
- United States Guards
- Corps of Invalids (Great Britain)
