= Siege of Port Hudson order of battle: Union =

The following is the organization of the Union forces engaged at the Siege of Port Hudson, during the American Civil War in 1863. The Confederate order of battle is listed separately.

== Abbreviations used ==
=== Military rank ===
- MG = Major General
- BG = Brigadier General
- Col = Colonel
- Ltc = Lieutenant Colonel
- Maj = Major
- Cpt = Captain
- Lt = 1st Lieutenant

=== Other ===
- w = wounded
- mw = mortally wounded
- k = killed
- c = captured

== Union forces ==
=== Army of the Gulf ===
==== XIX Corps ====
MG Nathaniel P. Banks

- Chief of Staff: BG George L. Andrews until 27 May, BG Charles P. Stone
- Chief of Artillery: BG Richard Arnold

Division	Brigade	Regiments and Others
1st Division; MG Christopher C. Augur	1st Brigade Col Edward P. Chapin (k); Col Charles J. Paine	2nd Louisiana: Col Charles J. Paine; 21st Maine: Col Elijah D. Johnson; 48th Massachusetts: Col Eben F. Stone; 49th Massachusetts: Ltc Burton D. Deming (k); 116th New York: Cpt John Higgins
1st Division; MG Christopher C. Augur	2nd Brigade BG Godfrey Weitzel; Col Stephen Thomas	12th Connecticut: Ltc Frank Henry Peck (w); 75th New York: Col Robert B. Merritt; 114th New York: Col Elisha B. Smith (mw); 160th New York: Ltc John B. Van Petten; 8th Vermont: Col Stephen Thomas
1st Division; MG Christopher C. Augur	3rd Brigade Col Nathan Dudley	30th Massachusetts: Ltc William W. Bullock; 50th Massachusetts: Col Carlos P. Messer; 161st New York: Col Gabriel T. Harrower; 174th New York: Maj George Keating
1st Division; MG Christopher C. Augur	Artillery	1st Battery, Indiana Heavy Artillery: Col John A. Keith; 1st Battery, Maine Light Artillery: Lt John E. Morton; 6th Battery, Massachusetts Light Artillery: Lt John F. Phelps; 12th Massachusetts Light Artillery (section): Lt Edwin M. Chamberlin; 18th Battery, New York Light Artillery: Cpt Albert G. Mack; Battery A, 1st U.S. Artillery: Cpt Edmund C. Bainbridge; Battery G, 5th U.S. Artillery: Lt Jacob B. Rawles
2nd Division; BG Thomas W. Sherman (w); BG George L. Andrews; BG Frank S. Nickerson; BG William Dwight	1st Brigade BG Neal S. Dow (w&c); Col David S. Cowles (k); Col Thomas S. Clark	26th Connecticut: Col Thomas G. Kingsley; 6th Michigan: Col Thomas S. Clark; 15th New Hampshire: Col John W. Kingman; 128th New York: Col David S. Cowles; 162nd New York: Col Lewis Benedict
2nd Division; BG Thomas W. Sherman (w); BG George L. Andrews; BG Frank S. Nickerson; BG William Dwight	2nd Brigade Col Alpha B. Farr; Col Thomas W. Cahill; Col Lewis Benedict	9th Connecticut: Ltc Richard Fitz Gibbons; 26th Massachusetts: Ltc Josiah A. Sawtell; 42nd Massachusetts: Ltc Joseph Stedman; 47th Massachusetts: Col Lucius B. Marsh
2nd Division; BG Thomas W. Sherman (w); BG George L. Andrews; BG Frank S. Nickerson; BG William Dwight	3rd Brigade BG Frank S. Nickerson	14th Maine: Col Thomas W. Porter; 24th Maine: Col George Marston Atwood; 28th Maine: Col Ephraim W. Woodman; 165th New York: Ltc Abel Smith, Jr. (mw May 27); 175th New York: Col Michael K. Bryan (k); 177th New York: Col Ira W. Ainsworth
2nd Division; BG Thomas W. Sherman (w); BG George L. Andrews; BG Frank S. Nickerson; BG William Dwight	Artillery	21st Battery, New York Light Artillery: Cpt James Barnes; 1st Battery, Vermont Light Artillery: Cpt George T. Hebard
3rd Division; BG Halbert E. Paine (w); Col Hawkes Fearing	1st Brigade Col Timothy Ingraham; Col Samuel P. Ferris	28th Connecticut: Col Samuel P. Ferris; 4th Massachusetts: Col Henry Walker; 16th New Hampshire: Col James Pike; 110th New York: Col Clinton H. Sage
3rd Division; BG Halbert E. Paine (w); Col Hawkes Fearing	2nd Brigade Col Hawkes Fearing; Maj John H. Alcot	8th New Hampshire: Ltc Oliver W. Lull (k, May 27); 133rd New York: Col Leonard D. H. Currie; 173rd New York: Maj A. Power Gallway; 4th Wisconsin: Col Sidney A. Bean (k, May 29)
3rd Division; BG Halbert E. Paine (w); Col Hawkes Fearing	3rd Brigade Col Oliver P. Gooding	31st Massachusetts: Ltc William S.B. Hopkins; 38th Massachusetts: Ltc William L. Rodman (k); 53rd Massachusetts: Col John W. Kimball; 156th New York: Col Jacob Sharpe
3rd Division; BG Halbert E. Paine (w); Col Hawkes Fearing	Artillery	4th Battery, Massachusetts Light Artillery: Lt Frederick W. Reinhard; Battery F, 1st U.S. Artillery: Cpt Richard C. Duryea; 2nd Battery, Vermont Light Artillery: Cpt Pythagoras E. Holcomb
4th Division; BG Cuvier Grover	1st Brigade BG William Dwight; Col Joseph S. Morgan	1st Louisiana (U.S.): Col Richard E. Holcomb (k), Ltc William O. Fiske; 22nd Maine: Col Simon G. Jerrard; 90th New York: Col Joseph S. Morgan; 91st New York Infantry Regiment: Col Jacob Van Zandt; 131st New York: Col Nicholas W. Day
4th Division; BG Cuvier Grover	2nd Brigade Col William K. Kimball	24th Connecticut: Col Samuel M. Mansfield; 12th Maine: Ltc Edward Ilsley; 41st Massachusetts: Col Thomas E. Chickering; 52nd Massachusetts: Col Halbert S. Greenleaf
4th Division; BG Cuvier Grover	3rd Brigade Col Henry W. Birge	13th Connecticut: Cpt Apollos Comstock; 25th Connecticut: Ltc Mason C. Weld; 26th Maine: Col Nathan H. Hubbard; 159th New York: Ltc Charles A. Burt
4th Division; BG Cuvier Grover	Artillery Cpt Henry W. Closson	2nd Battery Massachusetts Light Artillery: Cpt Ormand F. Nims; Battery L, 1st U.S. Artillery: Cpt Henry W. Closson; Battery C, 2nd U.S. Artillery: Lt Theodore Bradley
United States Colored Troops	Corps D'Afrique BG Daniel Ullman	6th Corps D'Afrique: Maj George Bishop; 7th Corps D'Afrique: Maj Cornelius Mowers; 8th Corps D'Afrique: Ltc William S. Mudgett; 9th Corps D'Afrique: Ltc Isaac S. Bangs; 10th Corps D'Afrique: Ltc Ladislas L. Zulavsky; 1st Louisiana Engineers: Col Justin Hodge
United States Colored Troops	Native Guard	1st Louisiana Native Guards: Ltc Chauncey J. Bassett; 3rd Louisiana Native Guards: Col John A. Nelson; 4th Louisiana Native Guards: Col Charles W. Drew
Cavalry	Grierson's Brigade Col Benjamin H. Grierson	6th Illinois Cavalry: Col Reuben Loomis; 7th Illinois Cavalry: Col Edward Prince; 1st Louisiana Cavalry: Maj Harai Robinson; 2nd Rhode Island Cavalry: Ltc Augustus W. Corliss; 2nd Massachusetts Cavalry: Maj James Magee; 14th New York Cavalry: Cpt George Branning; 4th Wisconsin Mounted: Maj Webster Moore

=== West Gulf Blockading Squadron ===
Rear Admiral David G. Farragut

Class	Vessel
Steam frigate	USS Hartford Cpt James S. Palmer
Steam frigate	USS Richmond Cpt James Alden
Steam frigate	USS Mississippi Cpt Melancton Smith
Steam frigate	USS Monongahela Cpt James P. McKinstry
Gunboat	USS Albatross Lt Commander John E. Hart
Gunboat	USS Genesee Commander William H. Macomb
Gunboat	USS Kineo Lt Commander John Watters
Ironclad	USS Essex Commander Charles H. B. Caldwell
