= XIX Corps (Union army) =

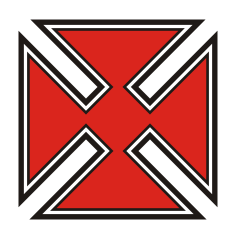
- XIX Corps badge
- Active: 1862–1865
- Country: United States of America
- Branch: Union Army
- Type: Army Corps
- Size: Corps
- Part of: Army of the Gulf; Union Army of the Shenandoah
- Engagements: American Civil War

Commanders
- Notable commanders: Nathaniel P. Banks

Insignia
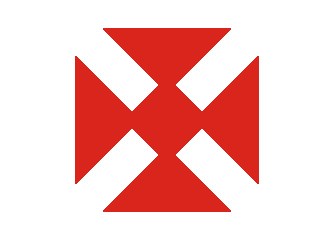
- 1st Division

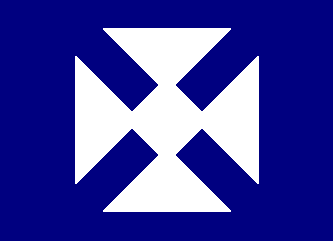
- 2nd Division

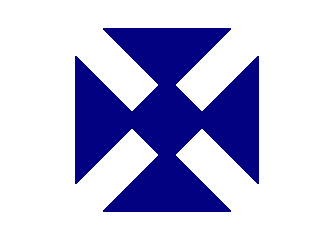
- 3rd Division

XIX Corps was a corps of the Union Army during the American Civil War. It spent most of its service in Louisiana and the Gulf, though several units fought in Virginia's Shenandoah Valley.

XIX Corps was created on December 14, 1862, and assigned to Maj. Gen. Nathaniel P. Banks, the commander of the Department of the Gulf. The corps comprised all Union troops then occupying Louisiana and east Texas. It originally consisted of four divisions, numbering 36,000 men.

== Port Hudson ==
In April 1863, the corps was involved in the actions at Fort Bisland and Irish Bend. It operated the Siege of Port Hudson from April 27–July 9, 1863, the fall of which, along with that of Vicksburg, Mississippi, closed off the Mississippi River to Confederate shipping. XIX Corps also gained measure of distinction for being the first Federal unit to use a large number of colored troops in action, particularly against Port Hudson, with Banks giving them due credit for their valiant contributions to the siege.

MG Nathaniel P. Banks

- Chief of Staff: BG George L. Andrews, BG Charles P. Stone

Division	Brigade	Regiments and Others
1st Division; MG Christopher C. Augur	1st Brigade Col Edward P. Chapin (k); Col Charles J. Paine	2nd Louisiana: Col Charles J. Paine; 21st Maine: Col Elijah D. Johnson; 48th Massachusetts: Col Eben F. Stone; 49th Massachusetts: Ltc Burton D. Deming (k); 116th New York: Cpt John Higgins
1st Division; MG Christopher C. Augur	2nd Brigade BG Godfrey Weitzel; Col Stephen Thomas	12th Connecticut: Ltc Frank H. Peck (w); 75th New York: Col Robert B. Merritt; 114th New York: Col Elisha B. Smith (mw); 160th New York: Ltc John B. Van Petten; 176th New York: Cols Charles C. Nott, Ambrose Stevens, Charles Lewis; 8th Vermont: Col Stephen Thomas
1st Division; MG Christopher C. Augur	3rd Brigade Col Nathan Dudley	30th Massachusetts: Ltc William W. Bullock; 50th Massachusetts: Col Carlos P. Messer; 161st New York: Col Gabriel T. Harrower; 174th New York: Maj George Keating
1st Division; MG Christopher C. Augur	Artillery	1st Battery, Indiana Heavy Artillery: Col John A. Keith; 1st Battery, Maine Light Artillery: Lt John E. Morton; 6th Battery, Massachusetts Light Artillery: Lt John F. Phelps; Section, 12th Massachusetts Light Artillery: Lt Edwin M. Chamberlin; 18th Battery, New York Light Artillery: Cpt Albert G. Mack; Battery A, 1st U.S. Light Artillery: Cpt Edmund C. Bainbridge; Battery G, 5th U.S. Artillery: Lt Jacob B. Rawles
2nd Division; BG Thomas W. Sherman (w); BG George L. Andrews; BG Frank S. Nickerson; BG William Dwight	1st Brigade BG Neal S. Dow (w&c); Col David S. Cowles (k); Col Thomas S. Clark	26th Connecticut: Ltc Joseph Selden; 6th Michigan: Col Thomas S. Clark; 15th New Hampshire: Col John W. Kingman; 128th New York: Col David S. Cowles; 162nd New York: Col Lewis Benedict
2nd Division; BG Thomas W. Sherman (w); BG George L. Andrews; BG Frank S. Nickerson; BG William Dwight	2nd Brigade Col Alpha B. Farr; Col Lewis Benedict	9th Connecticut: Ltc Richard Fitz Gibbons; 26th Massachusetts: Ltc Josiah A. Sawtell; 42d Massachusetts: Ltc Joseph Stedman; 47th Massachusetts: Col Lucius B. Marsh
2nd Division; BG Thomas W. Sherman (w); BG George L. Andrews; BG Frank S. Nickerson; BG William Dwight	3rd Brigade BG Frank S. Nickerson	14th Maine: Col Thomas W. Porter; 24th Maine: Col George Marston Atwood; 28th Maine: Col Ephriam W. Woodman; 165th New York: Ltc Abel Smith Jr. (mw); 175th New York: Col Michael K. Bryan (k); 177th New York: Col Ira W. Ainsworth
2nd Division; BG Thomas W. Sherman (w); BG George L. Andrews; BG Frank S. Nickerson; BG William Dwight	Artillery	21st Battery, New York Light Artillery: Cpt James Barnes; 1st Battery, Vermont Light Artillery: Cpt George T. Hebard
3rd Division; BG Halbert E. Paine (w); Col Hawkes Fearing	1st Brigade Col Timothy Ingraham; Col Samuel P. Ferris	28th Connecticut: Col Samuel P. Ferris; 4th Massachusetts: Col Henry Walker; 16th New Hampshire: Col James Pike; 110th New York: Col Clinton H. Sage
3rd Division; BG Halbert E. Paine (w); Col Hawkes Fearing	2nd Brigade Col Hawkes Fearing	8th New Hampshire: Ltc Oliver W. Lull; 133rd New York: Col Leonard D. H. Currie; 173rd New York: Maj A. Power Gallway; 4th Wisconsin: Col Sidney A. Bean
3rd Division; BG Halbert E. Paine (w); Col Hawkes Fearing	3rd Brigade Col Oliver P. Gooding	31st Massachusetts: Ltc William S.B. Hopkins; 38th Massachusetts: Ltc William L. Rodman (k); 53rd Massachusetts: Col John W. Kimball; 156th New York: Col Jacob Sharpe
3rd Division; BG Halbert E. Paine (w); Col Hawkes Fearing	Artillery	4th Battery, Massachusetts Light Artillery: Lt Frederick W. Reinhard; Battery F, 1st U.S. Light Artillery: Cpt Richard C. Duryea; 2nd Battery, Vermont Light Artillery: Cpt Pythagoras E. Holcomb
4th Division; BG Cuvier Grover	1st Brigade BG William Dwight; Col Richard E. Holcomb (k); Col Joseph S. Morgan	1st Louisiana (U.S.): Ltc William O. Fiske; 22nd Maine: Col Simon G. Jerrard; 90th New York: Col Joseph S. Morgan; 91st New York Infantry Regiment: Col Jacob Van Zandt; 131st New York: Col Nicholas W. Day
4th Division; BG Cuvier Grover	2nd Brigade Col William K. Kimball	24th Connecticut: Col Samuel M. Mansfield; 12th Maine: Ltc Edward Ilsley; 41st Massachusetts: Col Thomas E. Chickering; 52nd Massachusetts: Col Halbert S. Greenleaf
4th Division; BG Cuvier Grover	3rd Brigade Col Henry W. Birge	13th Connecticut: Cpt Apollos Comstock; 25th Connecticut: Ltc Mason C. Weld; 26th Maine: Col Nathan H. Hubbard; 159th New York: Ltc Charles A. Burt
4th Division; BG Cuvier Grover	Artillery Cpt Henry W. Closson	2nd Battery Massachusetts Light Artillery: Cpt Ormand F. Nims; Battery L, 1st U.S. Light Artillery: Cpt Henry W. Closson; Battery C, 2nd U.S. Light Artillery: Lt Theodore Bradley
United States Colored Troops	Corps D'Afrique BG Daniel Ullman	6th United States Colored Troops: Maj George Bishop; 7th United States Colored Troops: Maj Cornelius Mowers; 8th United States Colored Troops: Ltc William S. Mudgett; 9th United States Colored Troops: Ltc Isaac S. Bangs; 10th United States Colored Troops: Ltc Ladislas L. Zulavsky; 1st Louisiana Engineers: Col Justin Hodge
United States Colored Troops	Native Guard	1st Louisiana Native Guards: Ltc Chauncey J. Bassett; 3rd Louisiana Native Guards: Col John A. Nelson; 4th Louisiana Native Guards: Col Charles W. Drew
Cavalry	Grierson's Brigade Col Benjamin H. Grierson	6th Illinois Cavalry: Col Reuben Loomis; 7th Illinois Cavalry: Col Edward Prince; 1st Louisiana Cavalry: Maj Harai Robinson; 2nd Rhode Island Cavalry: Ltc Augustus W. Corliss; 2nd Massachusetts Cavalry: Maj James Magee; 14th New York Cavalry: Cpt George Branning; 4th Wisconsin Mounted: Maj Webster Moore

== Red River Campaign ==
In spring of 1864, the corps took part in Banks' disastrous Red River Campaign, under the command of William B. Franklin, who was wounded at Mansfield. After its conspicuous role in the failure, two divisions under William H. Emory were sent to Virginia to join Phillip Sheridan's operations in the Shenandoah Valley against Jubal Early (see Valley Campaigns of 1864). These troops took part in all of the major engagements of Sheridan's campaign, most notably at Opequon, where they lost some 2,000 men killed or wounded (mostly in Cuvier Grover's division).

== Georgia ==
After this, the corps was sent Savannah, Georgia, where it remained until the end of the war. The XIX Corps was officially disbanded on March 26, 1865, but the corps took part in the Grand Review in Washington, and some of its units remained in Savannah and Louisiana until 1866.
