= Battle of Ponchatoula =

Battle of the American Civil War

- Part of the American Civil War
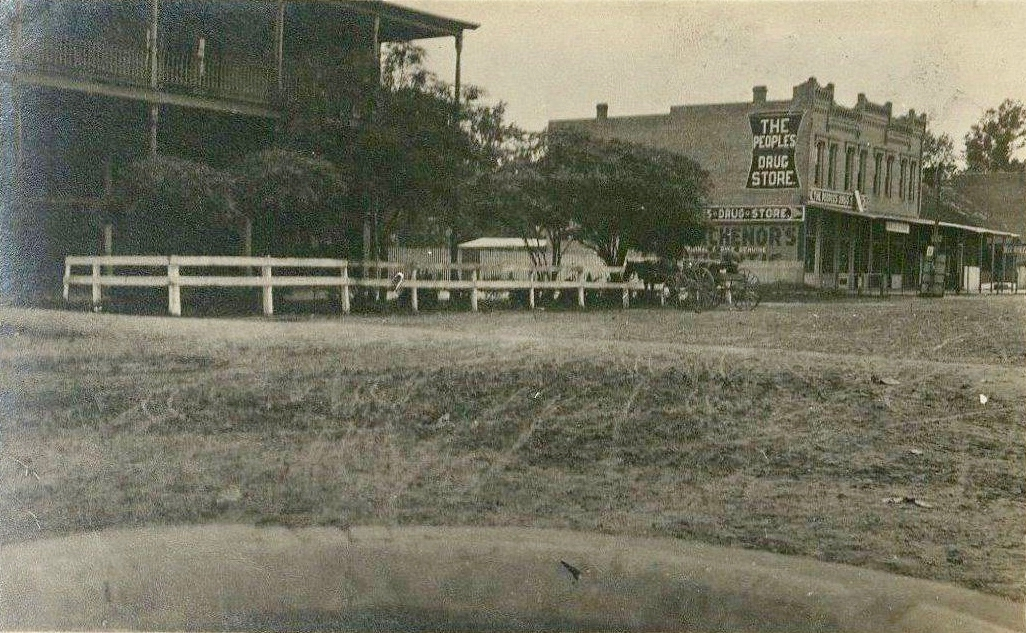
Date	March 24–26, 1863
Location	Ponchatoula, Louisiana 30.439°N 90.441°W
Result	Confederate victory

Belligerents
United States (Union)	(Confederate States of America) Confederate States

Commanders and leaders
Nathaniel P. Banks; Thomas W. Sherman; Thomas S. Clark	John C. Pemberton; Horace H. Miller

Units involved
6th Michigan Infantry; 9th Connecticut; 14th Maine; 24th Maine; 165th New York Infantry; 177th New York	1st Choctaw Battalion; 1st Mississippi Cavalry; 14th Mississippi Cavalry; 14th Mississippi Infantry; 20th Mississippi Infantry

Strength
1,200 (estimated)	400 (estimated)

Casualties and losses
Union Report: 0 killed; 9 wounded Confederate Report: 18 killed; 36 wounded (estimated)	Union Report: 3 killed; 11 wounded Confederate Report: 0 killed; several wounded

The Battle of Ponchatoula was a battle in Ponchatoula, Louisiana, and Ponchatoula Creek at the onset of the Vicksburg Campaign during the American Civil War. Fought from March 24 to March 26, 1863, the battle was part of an offensive campaign waged by the Union's 6th Michigan, 9th Connecticut, 14th Maine, 24th Maine, 165th New York Zouaves, and 77th New York infantry against Confederate troops to capture Ponchatoula for the Union and destroy the town's railroad bridge. This was ultimately a failure by the Union, as the outcome of the battle led to the Confederates regaining control of Ponchatoula.

== Background ==
From September 13 to 15, 1862, the 13th Connecticut, 12th Maine, and 26th Massachusetts conducted an Expedition to Pass Manchac and Ponchatoula led by Maj. George C. Strong against the 10th Arkansas Infantry Regiment, 9th Louisiana Infantry Regiment, Company D, also known as Caruther's Sharpshooters, and Confederate Home Guard under the command of Brig. Gen. M. Jeff Thompson. The Union's objective of destroying the Manchac railroad, along with 20 train carriages and the bridge over the Ponchatoula River, was a success. However, when the Confederate forces regrouped, Pvt. Elmore Dane of the 26th Massachusetts described it as such:

"Out of 125 men 40 were killed, wounded and missing, almost 50 percent of our number. We were kept as a reserved corps, and came up just in time to save the rest of the party from all being taken prisoners. We kept the enemy from out flanking them and covered their retreat. The fight took place at Paschola [Ponchatoula, La.] We went up the Maunshag river to the Jackson and New Orleans railroad and marched up the road. It was a bad defeat for us we had no artillery and the rebels were 1500 strong with 5 pieces of artillery. We were obliged to leave our dead on the field and the wounded in the hospital with the Doctors and assistants as prisoners in the Rebels hands as prisoners it was a hard jaunt and well nigh cost us all imprisonment … many more die of sickness than of bullets from the enemy …"

In early 1863, a new expedition was sent once again to Ponchatoula. Union headquarters at New Orleans were alarmed by an improbable invasion by "Stonewall" Jackson with 40,000 men. The Union officers considered the swamps as the most likely approach. A reconnaissance mission was ordered of Manchac Pass on the New Orleans, Jackson, & Greater Northern Railroad where it crossed at Jones Island. Union Officer Col. Langdon conducted a reconnaissance operation and found Confederates and "negroes" working on the north side of Manchac Pass, but he found no evidence of an approaching invasion. Maj. Gen. Nathaniel P. Banks issued orders to Col. Thomas S. Clark of the 6th Michigan to proceed to Manchac Pass.

On March 21, 1863, Clark's 6th Michigan expedition left Camp Parapet and proceeded along the New Orleans, Jackson, and Greater Northern Railroad. His orders were to proceed to South Manchac Pass, a journey of about 30 miles. An advanced detachment, led by Clark, proceeded ahead of the main body of troops. Around noon of the 22nd, Clark's main body had arrived at South Manchac Pass. There they waited for ships carrying the 165th New York. The steamships Savary and the Barrataria, an iron-clad gunboat with three schooners in tow, arrived in the evening. The next day, Clark's 6th Michigan was embarked on the steamships and schooners and Lt. Col. Abel Smith's 165th New York Zouaves proceeded north along the railroad. The 6th Michigan were to flank Ponchatoula, while the 165th New York attacked the town via railroad. As the troops began their movement, a storm gave way to a hurricane.

The hurricane soon dissipated as the steamships moved northwest on the Lake Maurepas. By evening, the steamships ceased all movement. The Savary ran aground before twilight, and the Barrataria continued up the Tickfaw River. The Confederates at Ponchatoula were alarmed by Union movements. Col. Horace H. Miller of the 20th Mississippi had been at Ponchatoula since 1862. Miller retreated and telegraphed Lt. Gen. Pemberton several times in which Miller requested reinforcements. Companies H & K of the 1st Mississippi Cavalry had been detached to Ponchatoula in December 1862. They were under the command of Miller and participated in the battle. Troops came from the 1st Choctaw Battalion, 14th Mississippi Infantry Regiment, and the 14th Mississippi Cavalry. The 1st Choctaw Battalion was organized in February at Newton Station, Mississippi. They were still electing officers and procuring needed materials under the leadership of Maj. John W. Pierce. The 14th Mississippi Infantry Regiment was on guard duty at Jackson, Mississippi. The men were scattered around Jackson doing various tasks. The 14th Mississippi Cavalry was detached to both Osyka, Mississippi, and Camp Moore near Tangipahoa, Louisiana. The 1st Choctaw Battalion and the 14th Mississippi Infantry Regiment were delayed by a downed bridge at Brookhaven, Mississippi, which was likely destroyed by the floods the recent hurricane brought.

== Opposing forces ==
=== Union ===
- Maj. Gen. Nathaniel P. Banks, at New Orleans.
- Brig. Gen. Thomas W. Sherman, 2nd Division, at New Orleans.
- Brig. Gen. Neal Dow, 1st Brigade, at New Orleans.
- Col. Ira W. Ainsworth, of the 177th New York at New Orleans.
- Col. George M. Atwood, of the 24th Maine at New Orleans.
- Col. Thomas S. Clark, of the 6th Michigan at New Orleans.
- Lt. Col. Edward Bacon, of the 6th Michigan at New Orleans.
- Lt. Col. Abel Smith, Jr., of the 165th New York (Zouaves) at New Orleans.
- Maj. Fredrick Frye, of the 9th Connecticut at New Orleans and Jones Island.
- Capt. Orlando W. Trask, of the 14th Maine at New Orleans.

=== Confederate ===
- Lt. Gen. John C. Pemberton, at Vicksburg, Mississippi.
- Lt. Col. Horace H. Miller, of the 20th Mississippi Infantry at Ponchatoula, Louisiana.
- Maj. Felix Dumonteil, Assistant Adjutant-General, of the 14th Confederate Cavalry, at Camp Moore near Tangipahoa, Louisiana.
- Maj. Robert J. Lawrence, three companies of the 14th Mississippi Infantry Regiment at Jackson, Mississippi.
- Maj. John W. Pierce, Companies A & B of the 1st Choctaw Battalion at Newton Station, Mississippi.
- Capt. Gadi Herren, Company H of the 1st Mississippi Cavalry Regiment at Ponchatoula, Louisiana.
- Capt. William V. Lester, Company K of the 1st Mississippi Cavalry at Ponchatoula, Louisiana.
- Capt. Thomas C. Rhodes, of the 14th Mississippi Cavalry at Osyka, Mississippi.

== First day of battle ==
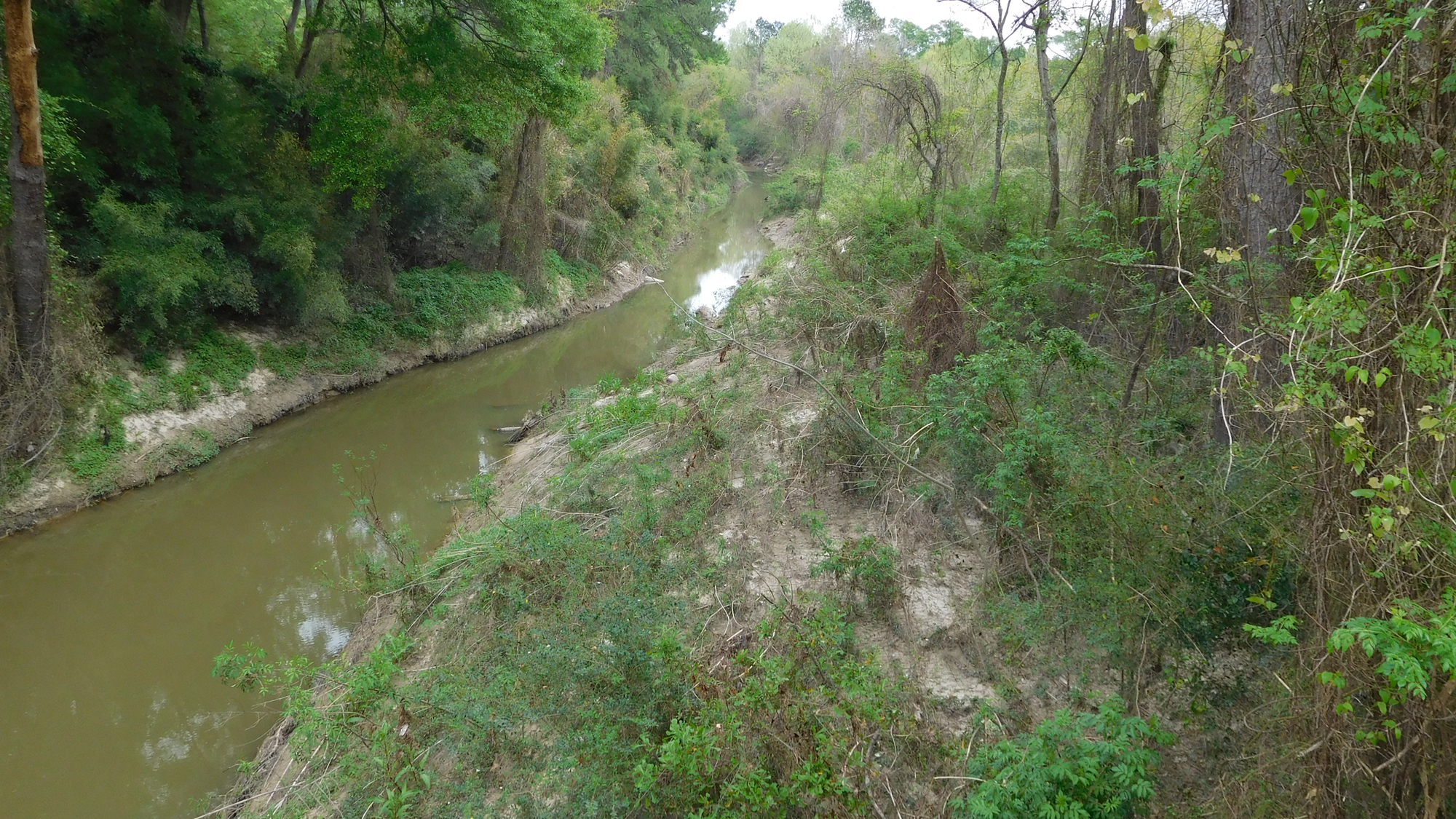
Ponchatoula Creek where the bridge skirmishes took place. Image taken on March 26, 2016 by Robert Bruce Ferguson.

On March 24, 1863, the Savary and its schooners in tow were set free and proceeded north on the Tickfaw River. The steamships arrived at Wadesborough, Louisiana, and the 6th Michigan disembarked. Clark's men then proceeded east through the piney woods toward Ponchatoula.

The 6th Michigan arrived at Ponchatoula a few moments before the 165th New York Zouaves. Ponchatoula was ransacked by the Union troops. Lt. Col. Edward Bacon of the 6th Michigan wrote, "Blue-coated soldiers are running here and there, far and near, singly and by dozens, some with their arms and some without, bringing all sorts of bundles, and eagerly dividing the spoils."

== Second day of battle ==
Early morning on March 25, Pemberton notified Miller that a bridge near Brookhaven was down and told Miller that reinforcements will be delayed until the 26th. Miller acknowledged Pemberton's letter at 5 a.m.

Citizens, who freely passed between the battle lines, brought reports that Confederate trains were bringing troops to Hammond, Louisiana.

Clark ordered the main body of troops to a point three miles south of Ponchatoula along the railroad, and he left a body of 300 men as pickets in the town. A smaller picket was left at Ponchatoula Creek.

== Third day of battle ==
At 3 p.m., Miller's Confederates began their assault to re-take Ponchatoula. The main thrust of the attack was along the railroad. The 1st Choctaw Battalion, 1st Mississippi Cavalry Detachments, and the 14th Mississippi Cavalry Detachment led the assault. A skirmish continued at the burned out railroad bridge over the Ponchatoula Creek for an hour.

At 4 p.m., Confederate troops flanked Union soldiers. The flanking troops may have been done by Indian scouts from the 1st Choctaw Battalion. The Union troop pickets retreated from Ponchatoula Creek as they were being chased by the Confederates.

By 4:30 p.m. the Confederates regained Ponchatoula.

At sunset (c. 7 p.m.), the Confederate offensive ended. Ponchatoula was again in the hands of the Confederates.

== Aftermath ==
The following day saw the retreat of Clark's expedition back to Manchac Pass. Bacon wrote, "We were able to ascertain that the long time we had spent about Pontchitoula had not been unimproved by the enemy. They had gathered a force greatly outnumbering ours. They had artillery and cavalry, and a large band of Indians for swamp fighting."

On March 27, Miller praised his troops. He wrote to Pemberton, "I cannot speak too highly of conduct of officers and men of this command."

Southern newspapers (The Memphis Daily Appeal, The True Delta, New Orleans Bee, and the Mobile News) reported that "We have learned that on Wednesday about 1500 Yankees made an incursion upon Ponchatoula, which was guarded by only 150 cavalry, so sudden was their advent that our men were obliged to run without their horses. They retreated about 30 miles, telegraphing at an intermediate station for reinforcements, which came the next day in the form of 1,200 of our Indian troops and run the Yankees back …"

On March 31, Col. Smith with a flag of truce met with Col. Miller regarding the return of stolen objects. Bacon wrote, "They are advancing. Col. Miller was there, and another colonel. They would hardly treat me civilly; they are terribly enraged against us."

The number of Union troops included 400 of the 6th Michigan, 40 from the 14th Maine, 20 from the 24th Maine, 306 from the 165th New York Zouaves, 100 from the 177th New York, and 26 from the 9th Connecticut. The rebels had, in approximation, 120 of the 1st Choctaw Battalion, 40 of the 20th Mississippi, 60 of the 1st Mississippi Cavalry, 50 from the 14th Mississippi Cavalry (from Camp Moore, Louisiana and Osyka, Mississippi), and 100 from the 14th Mississippi.

A large number of Indian soldiers deserted the 1st Choctaw Battalion when they were not paid for their services.

Ponchatoula would be held by the Confederates until it was recaptured by Union forces in May 1863. Three companies from Texas, two companies from New York, and a company from Massachusetts made their way through the forest and swamps toward Hammond, Louisiana during the night of May 11–12 of 1863. Colonel Edmund J. Davis of the 1st Texas Cavalry Regiment commanded the Union companies. Davis' advance was under the command of Captain Samuel T. Read of the 3rd Massachusetts Cavalry. On the morning of May 12, 1863, Read's men captured a number of prisoners, including some members from the disbanded 1st Choctaw Battalion. Davis' expedition was a success as the Confederacy was not a major presence for the remainder of the war.
