= 42nd Massachusetts Infantry Regiment =

42nd Regiment Massachusetts Volunteer Infantry
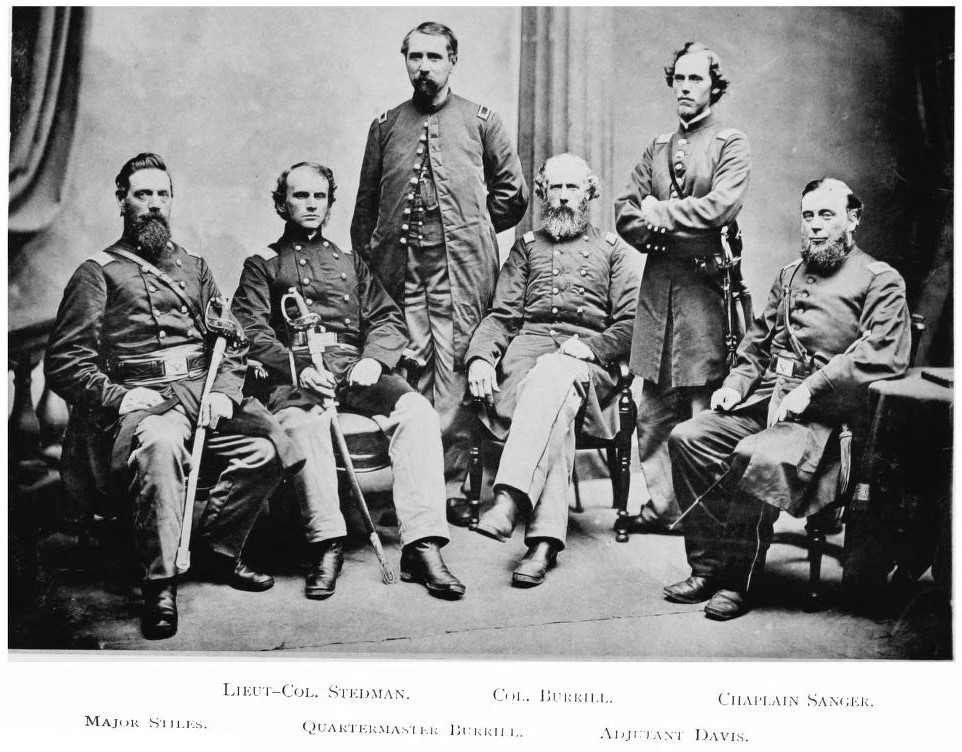
- Field and staff officers of the 42nd Massachusetts in 1862 or 1863. Commanding officer, Colonel Isaac S. Burrell, is seated at center.
- Active: September 13, 1862 – August 20, 1863; July 14, 1864 - November 11, 1864
- Country: United States
- Allegiance: Union
- Branch: Infantry
- Part of: In 1863: 2nd Brigade (Farr's), 2nd Division (Thomas Sherman's), XIX Corps, Army of the Gulf
- Engagements: American Civil War

Commanders
- Colonel: Isaac S. Burrell

Insignia
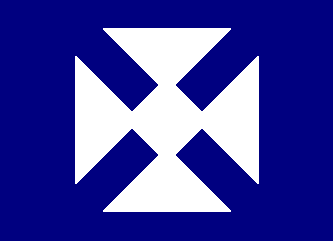
- XIX Corps (2nd Division) badge

The 42nd Regiment Massachusetts Volunteer Infantry was a regiment of infantry that served two tours in the Union Army during the American Civil War. The unit was first formed in September 1862 in response to President Abraham Lincoln's call for 300,000 men to serve for nine months.

== 9 months term ==
Organized and mustered in at Camp Meigs in Readville, Massachusetts, just outside of Boston, the 42nd Massachusetts did not depart for the south until November 11, 1862 due to a slow recruiting process and the reassignment of some companies to other units.

The regiment was assigned to the Army of the Gulf commanded by Major General Nathaniel P. Banks and saw action in Texas and Louisiana. On January 1, 1863, three companies of the 42nd Massachusetts, led by Col. Burrell, took part in the Battle of Galveston. These companies were forced to surrender to Confederate forces along with other Union troops and were taken prisoner. They were paroled on February 18 and eventually rejoined the rest of the regiment. The various companies were detailed to different locations and took part in garrison and engineering efforts in Louisiana during the spring of 1863. Company K was assigned to the engineering department of the XIX Corps and carried out bridge building and the removal of naval mines in various waterways. In this capacity, Company K took part in the Expedition to Bayou Teche and the Siege of Port Hudson.

The other companies served picket duty in the vicinity of Bayou St. John for the first half of 1863. Captain Orville W. Leonard, commanding Company C, was instrumental in the establishment of the 1st Louisiana Engineers, an African-American unit commanded by white officers. Most of the officers of the Louisiana unit were enlisted men commissioned from the 42nd Massachusetts. When the first term of the 42nd Massachusetts ended, the regiment left Louisiana on August 8, 1863 and were mustered out at Camp Meigs on August 20. The unit lost four men killed or mortally wounded in action and 46 due to disease during their first term.

The regiment carried 2 flags, one was a National Flag the other had a white field with the state's coat of arms in the middle with the inscription "Under freedom the sword seeks peaceful quiet," underneath.

== 100 days term ==
The 42nd Massachusetts enlisted for a second term of service in response to the call for volunteers to serve 100 days in the defense of Washington. The first companies were mustered in at Camp Meigs on July 14, 1864. They performed garrison and picket duty in Alexandria, Virginia and Great Falls, Maryland and were mustered out of service on November 11, 1864.

== See also ==
- Massachusetts in the Civil War
- List of Massachusetts Civil War units
