= 174th New York Infantry Regiment =

- Active: October 3, 1862 – February 17, 1864
- Country: United States
- Allegiance: Union
- Branch: Infantry
- Engagements: Siege of Port Hudson

The 174th New York Infantry Regiment (aka, "5th Metropolitan Guard") was an infantry regiment in the Union Army during the American Civil War.

== Service ==
The 174th New York Infantry was organized at New York City, New York beginning October 3, 1862 and mustered in for three-years service October 15 – November 13, 1862 under the command of Colonel Theodore W. Parmelee.

The regiment was attached to Grover's Division, Department of the Gulf, to January 1863. 2nd Brigade, 1st Division, XIX Corps, Department of the Gulf, January 1863. 3rd Brigade, 1st Division, XIX Corps, to August 1863. 1st Brigade, 1st Division, XIX Corps, to February 1864.

The 174th New York Infantry ceased to exist on February 17, 1864, when it was consolidated with the 162nd New York Volunteer Infantry.

== Detailed service ==
Left New York for New Orleans, Louisiana, December 7, 1862. Moved to Baton Rouge, Louisiana, January 13–14, 1863, and duty there until May 1863. Operations against Port Hudson March 7–27. Advance on Port Hudson May 12–24. Operations about Monett's Plantation and on Bayou Sara Road May 18–19. Reconnaissance to False River March 19. Action at Plain's Store May 21. Siege of Port Hudson May 24 – July 9. Assaults on Port Hudson May 27 and June 14. Surrender of Port Hudson July 9. Kock's Plantation, Donaldsonville, July 12–13. Duty at Baton Rouge August 1 to September 2. Sabine Pass Expedition September 4–11. Moved from Algiers to Brashear City September 16, then to Berwick. Western Louisiana Campaign October 3 – November 30. At New Iberia until January 7, 1864. Moved to Franklin January 7.

== Casualties ==
The regiment lost a total of 83 men during service; one officer and 22 enlisted men killed or mortally wounded, one officer and 59 enlisted men died of disease.

== Commanders ==
- Colonel Theodore W. Parmelee
- Colonel Benjamin F. Gott
- Major George Keating – commanded during the Siege of Port Hudson

== See also ==
- List of New York Civil War regiments
- New York in the Civil War
