= 90th New York Infantry Regiment =

- Active: September–December, 1861 to February 9, 1866
- Country: United States
- Allegiance: Union
- Branch: Infantry
- Nicknames: Hancock Guard, McClellan Chasseurs, and McClellan Rifles
- Engagements: Siege of Port Hudson; Battle of Kock's Plantation; Red River Campaign; Battle of Opequon; Battle of Fisher's Hill; Battle of Cedar Creek

Insignia
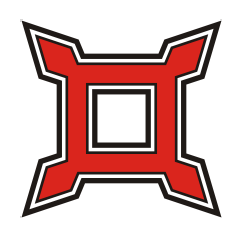
- X Corps

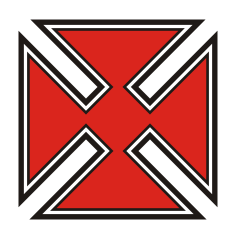
- XIX Corps

The 90th New York Infantry Regiment, the "Hancock Guard", "McClellan Chasseurs", "McClellan Rifles", was an infantry regiment of the Union Army during the American Civil War.

== Service ==
The companies were recruited principally:

- A, B, and C at New York City;
- D at Clyde;
- E at Unadilla, Nineveh, and Otego;
- F, G, H, I, and K at Brooklyn and elsewhere;
- Second B at Norwich;
- Second H at Chautauqua County, and
- Second I at Medina, Ridgway, and Shelby.

It left on January 5, 1862, for Key West, Florida. In June 1862, the regiment was under the command of Lt. Col. Louis W. Tinelli at Fort Jefferson, Florida.

Early in 1863 it joined the XIX Corps in Louisiana. The regiment moved to Port Hudson, Louisiana, Bayou Lafourche from New Orleans. and the Red River. The veterans took leave in August and September, 1864, and those not on leave went with the 160th New York Volunteer Infantry. The regiment was ordered to Virginia and joined the Union Army of the Shenandoah fighting against Gen. Jubal Early. Soldiers who didn't reenlist left in December, 1864. The regiment was consolidated into six companies, which received members of the 114th, 116th and 133rd New York Volunteer Infantry. The regiment served in William Dwight's division at Washington, and at Savannah, Georgia. It was then ordered to Hawkinsville, Georgia, and mustered out at Savannah.

== Total strength and casualties ==
During its service the regiment lost by death, killed in action, 2 officers, 33 enlisted men; of wounds received in action, 25 enlisted men; of disease and other causes, 8 officers, 183 enlisted men; total, 10 officers, 241 enlisted men; aggregate, 251; of whom 14 enlisted men died in the hands of the enemy.

== Commanders ==
- Colonel Joseph S. Morgan
- Colonel Nelson Shaurman
- Lieutenant Colonel Lewis W. Tinelli

== See also ==
- List of New York Civil War regiments
