= 50th Massachusetts Infantry Regiment =

50th Regiment Massachusetts Volunteer Infantry
- Active: September 30, 1862 – August 24, 1863
- Country: United States
- Allegiance: Union
- Branch: Union Army
- Type: Infantry
- Size: Regiment
- Part of: In 1863: 3rd Brigade, 1st Division, XIX Corps
- Engagements: American Civil War

Commanders
- Colonel: Carlos P. Messer

The 50th Regiment Massachusetts Volunteer Infantry was a regiment of infantry that served in the Union Army during the American Civil War. It was one of the 18 Massachusetts regiments formed in response to President Abraham Lincoln's August 1862 call for 300,000 men to serve for nine months. The regiment was recruited in Essex County and rendezvoused for mustering in at Camp Edwin M. Stanton in Boxford, Massachusetts. The 50th Massachusetts was assigned to the Department of the Gulf under Major General Nathaniel P. Banks and shipped for Louisiana. The regiment saw combat during the Siege of Port Hudson.

== Formation and early duty ==
Companies began assembling at Camp Edwin M. Stanton in Boxford on during the second week of September 1862. The final of the ten companies was mustered into federal service on September 30. Carlos P. Messer, a veteran of the 5th Massachusetts who had commanded a company during the Battle of Bull Run was appointed as colonel and commanding officer. The regiment was issued smoothbore Springfield Model 1842 muskets rather than the more common, and more accurate, Springfield Model 1861 rifled musket. The soldiers of the regiment were somewhat dissatisfied with the older model weapons which were of little use at long range. However, the fact that the regiment was armed with these weapons kept them out of the worst of the fighting during the June 14 assault at Port Hudson as they were used as support troops rather than being part of the advanced assault.

On November 19, the regiment departed Massachusetts by rail to Norwich, Connecticut and then took steamships to New York City. After spending the night at barracks in the city, they marched to Camp Banks on Long Island which served as a rendezvous for the various regiments assigned to reinforce Gen. Banks's Department of the Gulf in preparation for an expedition against Port Hudson, Louisiana. Due to a shortage in transport ships, the companies of the 50th Massachusetts were separated and traveled on separate vessels. Company I reached Baton Rouge, Louisiana rapidly, arriving on December 14. It was temporarily attached to the 30th Massachusetts until the rest of the 50th Massachusetts arrived. Due to various delays, being held for some time at Hilton Head, South Carolina, three more companies arrived at Baton Rough on February 1, 1863. Other companies were delayed by leaking vessels. Three companies went aboard a ship in which there was a smallpox outbreak, were quarantined, and did not join the regiment until April 2.

== Port Hudson Campaign ==
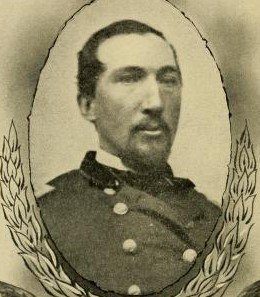
Col. Carlos P. Messer

On March 14, 1863, the 50th Massachusetts participated in a reconnaissance toward Port Hudson with their division commanded by Maj. Gen. Christopher C. Augur. The regiment did not engage in any combat during this reconnaissance and afterward returned to their camp in Baton Rouge. On March 20, the regiment was posted at Winters Plantation, across the Mississippi River from Confederate-held Port Hudson and conducted picket duty there for a week, then returned to Baton Rouge. Apart from the arrival of their final three companies on April 2, and a brief expedition to destroy the Bayou Montecino bridge in East Baton Rouge Parish, the next month and a half was generally uneventful for the regiment as they conducted guard duty in and around Baton Rouge.

The 50th Massachusetts left camp with its brigade on May 12, 1863 about a week before the main body of Banks's forces to serve guard duty near an important crossing of White's Bayou. After Union forces had deployed around Port Hudson for an assault, the 50th Massachusetts moved north to join them on May 26. The regiment took part in the May 27 assault on Port Hudson—their first time in combat. The 50th Massachusetts advanced in line with their brigade over rugged ground strewn with felled trees. Under constant fire from the Confederate breastworks, the lines soon became broken. An order to halt was given and after firing in place for a time, the regiment retreated. The regiment lost one killed and three wounded. The Union assault on May 27 failed to take Port Hudson.

Union troops attempted a second assault on June 14. During this assault, the 50th Massachusetts supported Union batteries and did not take part in the unsuccessful advance on the Confederate fortifications. Confederates surrendered their position at Port Hudson on July 9 after hearing that the larger stronghold of Vicksburg, Mississippi had surrendered. The 50th Massachusetts was assigned to garrison duty in Port Hudson where they remained until the end of their service on July 29.

== Mustering out ==
On July 29, 1863, the 50th Massachusetts boarded the steamship Omaha and headed for home via the Mississippi River. Their voyage was delayed when the steamship went aground on a sandbar, requiring the transfer of the regiment to a different vessel. They reached Cairo, Illinois on August 5 and traveled by rail to Boston, which they reached on August 11. The regiment was mustered out at Camp Lander in Wenham on August 24, 1863. During its service, the unit lost one man killed in action and 88 by disease.

== See also ==
- Massachusetts in the Civil War
- List of Massachusetts Civil War units
