= 22nd Maine Infantry Regiment =

- Active: October 10, 1862, to August 14, 1863
- Country: United States
- Allegiance: Union
- Branch: Infantry
- Engagements: Bayou Teche Campaign; Siege of Port Hudson

The 22nd Maine Infantry Regiment was an infantry regiment that served in the Union Army during the American Civil War.

== Service ==
The 22nd Maine Infantry was organized in Bangor, Maine and mustered in October 10, 1862, for nine months' service under the command of Colonel Simon G. Jerrard.

The regiment left Maine for Washington, D.C., October 21. Duty at Arlington Heights, Virginia, until November 3. Moved to Fortress Monroe, Virginia, November 3, then to Ship Island, Mississippi, and New Orleans, Louisiana, December 2–15. Attached to Grover's Division, Department of the Gulf, to January 1863. 1st Brigade, 4th Division, XIX Corps, Army of the Gulf, to July 1863. Moved to Baton Rouge, Louisiana, January 16, 1863. Duty there until March. Operations against Port Hudson, Louisiana, March 7–20. Moved to Donaldsonville March 26, then to Brashear City. Operations in western Louisiana April 9-May 14. Teche Campaign April 11–20. Porter's and McWilliams' Plantations at Indian Bend April 13. Irish Bend April 14. Moved to Franklin April 15. Bayou Vermilion April 17. Moved to New Iberia April 25; to Washington May 6, then to Brashear City May 11–27. Moved to Port Hudson May 28. Siege of Port Hudson June 1-July 8. Assault at Port Hudson June 14. Surrender of Port Hudson July 8. Ordered home July 24.

The 22nd Maine Infantry mustered out of service August 14, 1863.

== Casualties ==
The regiment lost a total of 180 men during service; 1 officer and 8 enlisted men killed or mortally wounded, 2 officers and 169 enlisted men died of disease.

== Commanders ==
- Colonel Simon G. Jerrard

== See also ==
- List of Maine Civil War units
- Maine in the American Civil War
