= 28th Maine Infantry Regiment =

- Active: October 18, 1862, to August 31, 1863
- Country: United States
- Allegiance: Union
- Branch: Infantry
- Engagements: Siege of Port Hudson (six companies)

The 28th Maine Infantry Regiment was an infantry regiment that served in the Union Army during the American Civil War.

== Service ==
The 28th Maine Infantry was organized in Augusta, Maine and mustered on October 18, 1862, for nine months' service under the command of Colonel Ephriam W. Woodman.

The regiment left Maine for Washington, D.C., October 26. Stopped at New York and served duty at Fort Schuyler until November 26, and at East New York until January 17, 1863. Moved to Fortress Monroe, Virginia, January 17–22, then to New Orleans, Louisiana, January 22–29. Attached to 2nd Brigade, 2nd Division, XIX Corps, Department of the Gulf, to May 1863. 3rd Brigade, 2nd Division, XIX Corps, Department of the Gulf, to July 1863 (6 companies). Served duty at Chalmette, Louisiana, until February 15, 1863. Moved to Pensacola, Florida, February 15, returning to New Orleans March 22, then moved to Donaldsonville and duty there and at Plaquemine until May 27. (Six companies were ordered to Port Hudson May 27. Siege of Port Hudson May 30-July 8. Assault on Port Hudson June 14. Ordered to Donaldsonville July 4, and duty there until July 12.) Four companies remained on duty at Donaldsonville May 27 to July 12. Action at Donaldsonville June 28 (4 companies). Moved to Baton Rouge July 12, then to Cairo, Illinois, August 6, and home.

The 28th Maine Infantry mustered out of service August 31, 1863.

== Casualties ==
The regiment lost a total of 154 men during service; 1 officer and 10 enlisted men killed or mortally wounded, 3 officers and 140 enlisted men due to disease.

== Commanders ==
- Colonel Ephriam W. Woodman

== Notable members ==
- Captain Augustin Thompson, Company G - physician, businessman, and philanthropist who created Moxie soft drink and the company that manufactured it

== See also ==
- List of Maine Civil War units
- Maine in the American Civil War
