= 21st Maine Infantry Regiment =

- Active: October 14, 1862, to August 25, 1863
- Country: United States
- Allegiance: Union
- Branch: Infantry
- Engagements: Siege of Port Hudson

The 21st Maine Infantry Regiment was an infantry regiment that served in the Union Army during the American Civil War.

== Service ==
The 21st Maine Infantry was organized in Augusta, Maine and mustered in October 14, 1862, for nine months' service under the command of Colonel Elijah D. Johnson.

The regiment left Maine for Washington, D.C., October 21. Ordered upon reaching Trenton, N.J., to return to New York, and served duty at East New York until January 1863. Embarked for New Orleans, La., January 9. Companies A, C, E, F, H, and K, on the steamer Onward, reached New Orleans January 31, and moved to Baton Rouge, La., February 3. The balance of the regiment arrived at Baton Rouge February 11. Attached to 1st Brigade, 1st Division, XIX Corps, Department of the Gulf, to July 1863. Participated in the operations against Port Hudson March 7–20, 1863. Served duty at Baton Rouge until May. Advance on Port Hudson May 20–24. Action at Plains Store May 21. Siege of Port Hudson May 24-July 8. Assaults on Port Hudson May 27 and June 14. Surrender of Port Hudson July 8. Ordered home July 24.

The 21st Maine Infantry mustered out of service August 25, 1863.

== Casualties ==
The regiment lost a total of 172 men during service; 1 officer and 26 enlisted men killed or mortally wounded, 1 officer and 144 enlisted men died of disease.

== Commanders ==
- Colonel Elijah D. Johnson

== See also ==
- List of Maine Civil War units
- Maine in the American Civil War
