= Franklin S. Nickerson =

American lawyer

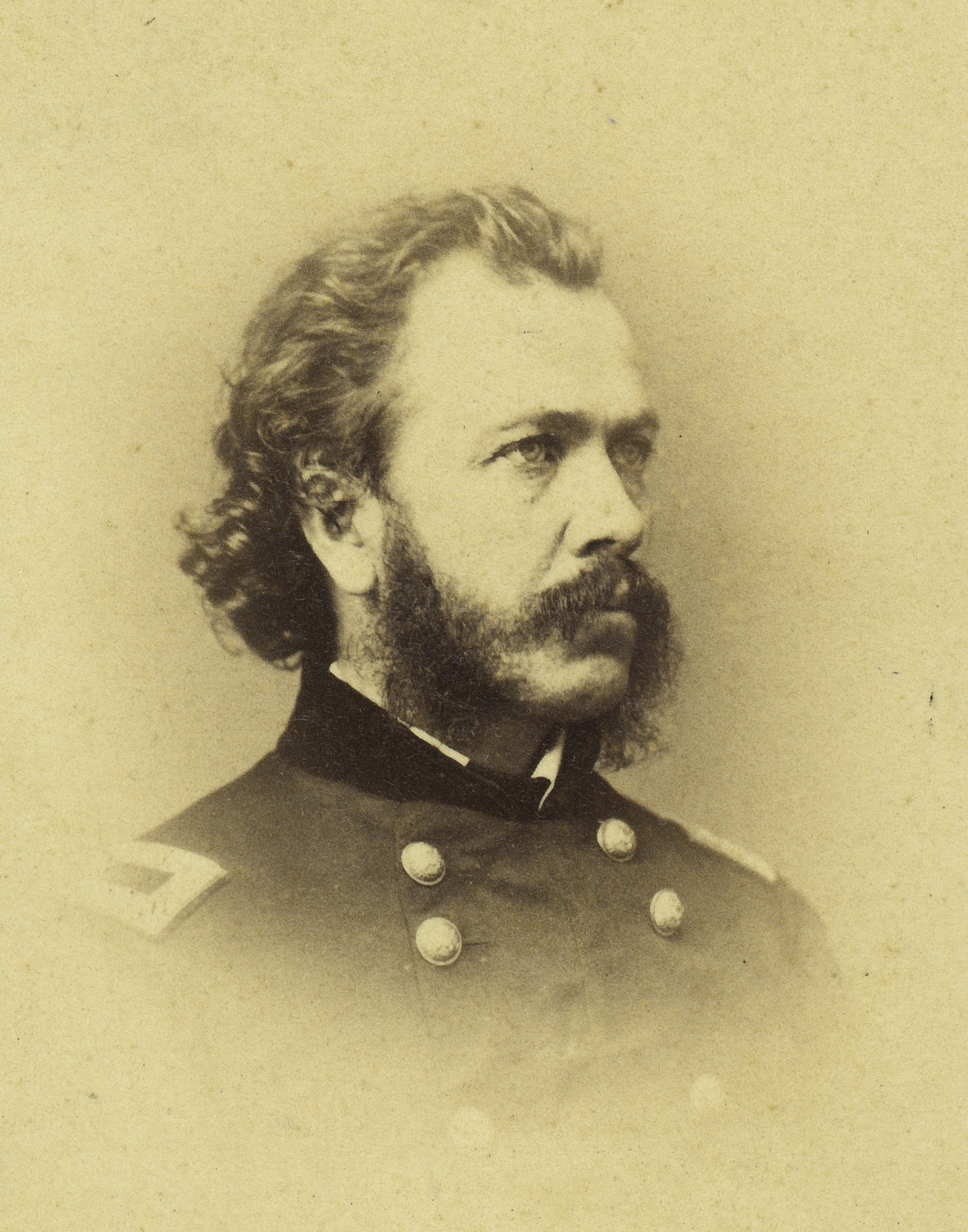
- Born: August 27, 1826; Swanville, Maine, US
- Died: January 23, 1917 (aged 90); Boston, Massachusetts, US
- Military career
- Allegiance: United States of America; Union
- Branch: United States Army; Union Army
- Service years: 1861–1865
- Rank: Brigadier General
- Nickname: "Frank"
- Commands: 4th Maine Volunteer Infantry
- Conflicts: American Civil War; First Battle of Bull Run; Battle of Baton Rouge; Siege of Port Hudson; Red River Campaign
- Other work: Lawyer

Franklin Stillman Nickerson was a Union general during the American Civil War. He primarily served in the Department of the Gulf.

== Biography ==
Nickerson was born in Swanville, Maine in 1826. He graduated from the East Corinth Academy in Maine and practiced law. He worked as a U.S. Customs agent prior to the Civil War.

In 1861 Nickerson joined the 4th Maine Volunteer Regiment as a major. He fought at the first Battle of Bull Run where he was commended by Oliver O. Howard. He became lieutenant colonel, then colonel of the 14th Maine Volunteer Regiment and was sent to Louisiana. He fought in the Battle of Baton Rouge and was subsequently promoted to brigadier general of volunteers on November 29, 1862.

General Nickerson took command of the 3rd Brigade in General Thomas W. Sherman's 2nd Division of the Army of the Gulf. He led the brigade at the siege of Port Hudson. On May 28 Generals Sherman and Dow were wounded in the Union assault across the Slaughter Field, but Nickerson being the ranking officer in the division wasn't notified until later in the day. Therefore, the division briefly fought leaderless. Nickerson led the division for only a short time until replaced by General William Dwight two days later. Nickerson continued to lead his brigade throughout the siege. He was transferred to command the 1st Brigade, 2nd Division in the XIX Corps during the Red River Campaign. In July 1864 he was placed in command of the Defenses of New Orleans and resigned in May 1865.

After the war Nickerson resumed his law practice. He died in Boston, Massachusetts in 1917.

== See also ==
- List of American Civil War generals (Union)
