= 26th Maine Infantry Regiment =

- Active: October 11, 1862, to August 17, 1863
- Country: United States
- Allegiance: Union
- Branch: Infantry
- Engagements: Siege of Port Hudson

The 26th Maine Infantry Regiment was an infantry regiment that served in the Union Army during the American Civil War.

== Service ==
The 26th Maine Infantry was organized in Bangor, Maine and mustered in on October 11, 1862, for nine months' service under the command of Colonel Nathan H. Hubbard.

The regiment left Maine for Washington, D.C., October 26. Duty in the defenses of that city until November 16. Moved to Fortress Monroe, Virginia, November 16, then sailed for New Orleans, Louisiana, December 2. Attached to Grover's Division, Department of the Gulf, to January 1863. 3rd Brigade, 4th Division, XIX Corps, Department of the Gulf, to July 1863. Duty at Camp Chalmette, Louisiana, until January 8, 1863. Occupation of Baton Rouge, Louisiana, December 17, 1862 (part of the regiment). Rest of the regiment moved to Baton Rouge January 8, 1863, and served duty there until March 13. Operations against Port Hudson March 13–20. Moved to Donaldsonville March 28, then to Thibodeauxville and Brashear City. Operations in western Louisiana April 9-May 14. Bayou Teche Campaign April 11–20. Irish Bend April 14. Bayou Vermilion April 17. Guarded and conducted supply train from Alexandria to Brashear City, a march of 300 miles, May 21–26. Moved to Algiers May 27, then to Port Hudson May 29. Siege of Port Hudson May 30-July 8. Assault on Port Hudson June 14. Surrender of Port Hudson July 8. Ordered home July 25.

The 26th Maine Infantry mustered out of service August 17, 1863.

== Casualties ==
The regiment lost a total of 165 men during service; 34 enlisted men killed or mortally wounded, 1 officer and 130 enlisted men due to disease.

== Commanders ==
- Colonel Nathan H. Hubbard
- Lieutenant William Oliver McDonald

== See also ==
- List of Maine Civil War units
- Maine in the American Civil War
