= 15th New Hampshire Infantry Regiment =

- Active: October 6, 1862, to August 13, 1863
- Country: United States
- Allegiance: Union
- Branch: Infantry
- Engagements: Siege of Port Hudson

The 15th New Hampshire Infantry Regiment was an infantry regiment that served in the Union Army during the American Civil War.

== Service ==
The 15th New Hampshire Infantry was organized in Concord, New Hampshire, October 6–16, 1862, and mustered in for nine months' service under the command of Colonel John W. Kingman.

The regiment left New Hampshire for New York City November 13, 1862; then sailed for New Orleans, Louisiana, December 19, arriving December 26. It was attached to Sherman's Division, Department of the Gulf, to January 1863. 1st Brigade, 2nd Division, XIX Corps, Army of the Gulf, to July 1863. 2nd Brigade, 3rd Division, XIX Corps, to August 1863. Moved from Carrollton to Camp Parapet, Louisiana, January 28, 1863, and served duty there until May. Moved to Springfield Landing May 20–22. Siege of Port Hudson, La., May 27-July 9. Assaults on Port Hudson May 27 and June 14. Surrender of Port Hudson July 9. Moved to Concord, New Hampshire, July 26-August 8.

The 15th New Hampshire Infantry mustered out of service August 13, 1863, at Concord, New Hampshire.

== Casualties ==
The regiment lost a total of 161 men during service; 27 enlisted men killed or mortally wounded, 134 enlisted men died of disease.

== Commanders ==
- Colonel John W. Kingman

== See also ==
- List of New Hampshire Civil War units
- New Hampshire in the American Civil War
