= 133rd New York Infantry Regiment =

- Active: September 24, 1862 - June 6, 1865
- Country: United States
- Allegiance: Union
- Branch: Infantry
- Engagements: Bayou Teche Campaign; Battle of Fort Bisland; Siege of Port Hudson; Red River Campaign; Battle of Mansura; Battle of Fort Stevens

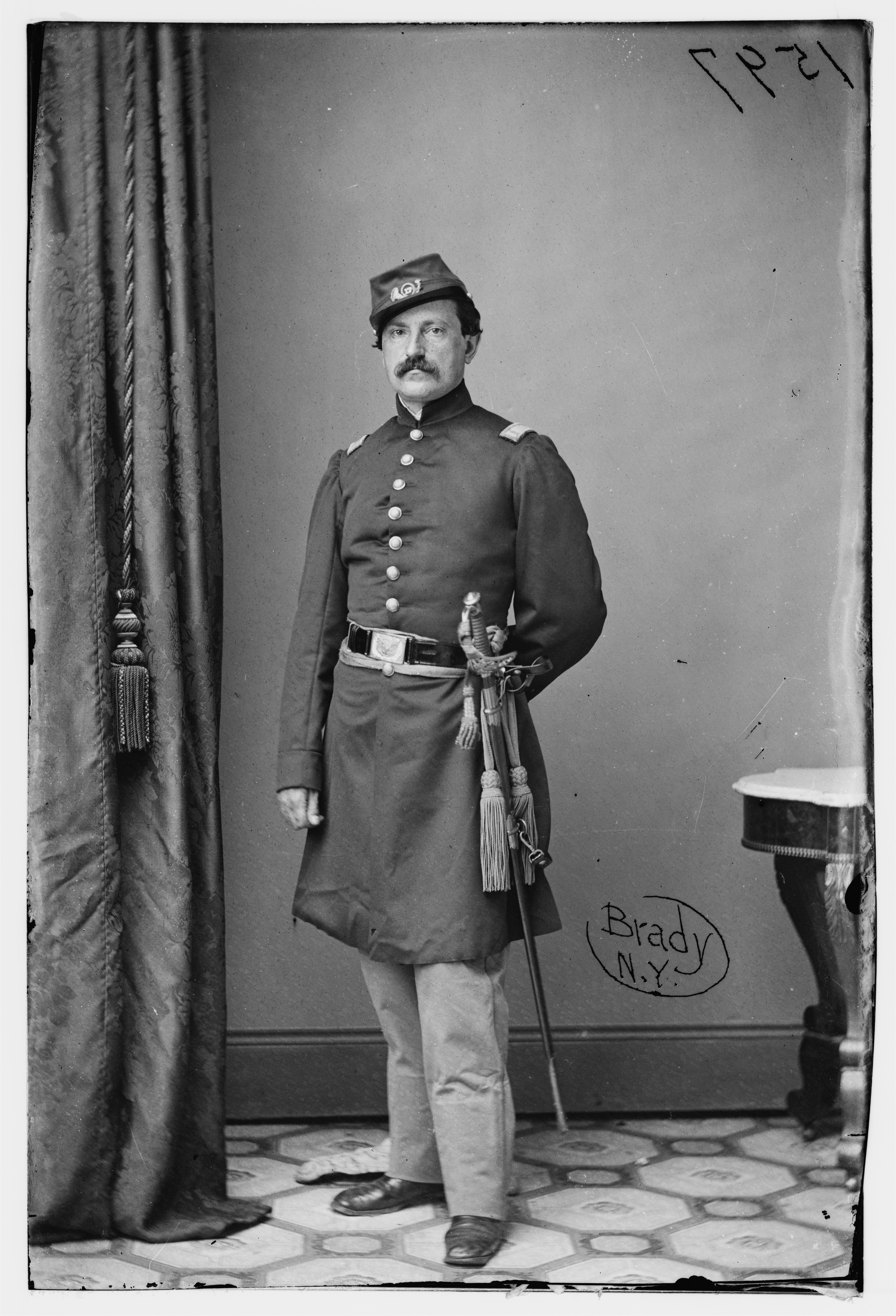
Capt. James D. Hawes, 133rd N.Y. Volunteers

The 133rd New York Volunteer Infantry (a.k.a. "2nd Regiment Metropolitan Guard") was an infantry regiment in the Union Army during the American Civil War.

== Service ==
The 133rd New York Infantry Regiment was organized at New York City, New York and mustered in for three-years service on September 24, 1862, under the command of Colonel Leonard D. H. Currie.

The regiment was attached to Abercrombie's Division, Defenses of Washington, D.C., to November 1862. Grover's Brigade, Banks' New Orleans Expedition, to December 1862. Grover's Division, Department of the Gulf, to January 1863. 2nd Brigade, 3rd Division, XIX Corps, Department of the Gulf, to October 1863. Defenses of New Orleans, Louisiana, to April 1864. 1st Brigade, 2nd Division, XIX Corps, to June 1864. 3rd Brigade, 1st Division, XIX Corps, Department of the Gulf, to July 1864, and Army of the Shenandoah, Middle Military Division, to February 1865. 3rd Brigade, 1st Provisional Division, Army of the Shenandoah, to April 1865. 3rd Brigade, Dwight's Division, Defenses of Washington, D.C., XXII Corps, to June 1865.

Recruits were transferred to the 90th New York Volunteer Infantry on May 31, 1865. The 133rd New York Infantry mustered out of service June 6, 1865.

== Detailed service ==
Left New York for Washington, D.C., October 8, 1862. Duty in the defenses of Washington, D. C., until November 1862. Moved to New Orleans, La., November, 1862. Occupation of Baton Rouge, La., December 17, and duty there until March 1863. Operations on Bayou Plaquemine February 12–28. Operations against Port Hudson, La., March 7–27. Moved to Algiers April 3, then to Brashear City April 8. Operations in western Louisiana April 9-May 14. Bayou Teche Campaign April 11–20. Fort Bisland, near Centreville, April 12–13. Pursuit to Opelousas April 15–20. Expedition from Opelousas to Chicotsville and Bayou Boeuf April 26–29. Expedition to Alexandria May 4–12. March to Port Hudson May 19–26. Siege of Port Hudson May 26-July 9. Expedition to Niblitt's Bluff May 26–29. Assault on Port Hudson June 14. Surrender of Port Hudson July 9. Moved to New Orleans July 15 and duty there until August 28. Sabine Pass Expedition September 4–12. Moved to Brashear City September 16, then to Berwick City. Western Louisiana "Teche" Campaign October 3-November 30. Duty in the defenses of New Orleans until April 1864. Red River Campaign April 26-May 22. Construction of dam at Alexandria April 30-May 10. Retreat to Mansura May 13–20. Mansura May 16. At Morganza until July 2. Moved to New Orleans, La., then to Fort Monroe and Deep Bottom, Va., July 2–18. Moved to Washington, D.C., July 31. Sheridan's Shenandoah Valley Campaign August 7-November 28. Detached from army August 14, and duty as supply train guard for Sheridan's army until October 27. Duty at Middletown, Newtown, Stephenson's Depot, and Winchester and in the Shenandoah Valley until April 1865. Moved to Washington, D.C., April 20, and duty there until June. Grand Review of the Armies May 23–24.

== Casualties ==
The regiment lost a total of 122 men during service; 2 officers and 41 enlisted men killed or mortally wounded, 1 officer and 78 enlisted men died of disease.

== Commanders ==
- Colonel Leonard D. H. Currie

== See also ==
- List of New York Civil War regiments
- New York in the Civil War
