= 1st Maine Light Artillery Battery =

- Active: December 18, 1861 – July 15, 1865
- Country: United States of America
- Allegiance: Union
- Branch: Artillery
- Engagements: Siege of Port Hudson; Battle of Fort Stevens; Third Battle of Winchester; Battle of Fisher's Hill; Battle of Cedar Creek

1st Maine Light Artillery Battery was an artillery battery that served in the Union Army during the American Civil War.

== Service ==
The 1st Battery was organized in Portland, Maine and mustered in for three years of service on December 18, 1861.

The battery was attached to 3rd Brigade, Department of the Gulf, until September 1862. It was attached to Weitzel's Reserve Brigade, Department of the Gulf, until January 1863. It was attached to Artillery, 1st Division, XIX Corps, Department of the Gulf, until January 1864, and the 2nd Division until April 1864. It then served at Camp Barry, Defenses of Washington, XXII Corps, until July 1864. It was attached to Artillery, 2nd Division, XIX Corps, Army of the Shenandoah, Middle Military Division, until February 1865. Finally, it was attached to 2nd Division, Army of the Shenandoah.

The 1st Maine Battery mustered out of service July 15, 1865, at Portland, Maine.

== Detailed service ==
Moved to Lowell, Mass., December 19, and duty there until February 1862. Moved to Boston February 2, and there embarked on steamer Idaho for Ship Island, Miss., February 8, arriving there March 10. Duty at Ship Island until May 8. Moved from Ship Island, Miss., to New Orleans, La., May 8–15, and served provost duty there until September 1862. Duty at Camp Parapet September 1 – October 24. Operations in La Fourche District October 24 – November 6. Action at Georgia Landing, Labadieville, October 27. At Thibodeauxville until January 1863. Expedition up the Teche January 11–18. Action with steamer Cotton, Bayou Teebe, January 14. At Camp Stevens, Brashear City, and Bayou Boeuf until April. Operations in western Louisiana April 9 – May 14. Teche Campaign April 11–20. Fort Bisland, near Centreville, April 12–13. Jeanerette April 14. Expedition from Opelousas to Barre Landing April 21. Siege of Port Hudson May 23 – July 8. Thompson's Creek May 25. Assaults on Port Hudson May 27 and June 14. Surrender of Port Hudson July 8. Koch's Plantation, Donaldsonville, July 12–13. Moved to Baton Rouge August 3, and duty there until September 18. Western Louisiana Campaign October 3 – November 18. At New Iberia until January 7, 1864. Moved to Franklin January 7, then to Brashear City and New Orleans January 18–20. On veteran furlough February and March. Moved to Annapolis, Md., April 15–19, then to Camp Barry, Washington, D.C., April 20. Duty there and at Fort Smith and Fort Strong, Defenses of Washington, until July. Repulse of Early's attack on Washington July 11–12. At Camp Barry until July 30. Ordered to Tenleytown July 30, and joined XIX Corps at Monocacy Junction August 1. Sheridan's Shenandoah Valley Campaign August 7 – November 28. March to Middletown August 6–15; to Winchester, then to Berryville August 15–17, and to Halltown August 21. At Berryville August 28 – September 18. Battle of Opequan, Winchester, September 19. Fisher's Hill September 22. Battle of Cedar Creek October 19. Duty near Cedar Creek until November 9, and near Winchester until December 30. At Stevenson's Depot until January 14, 1865; at Manchester until April 14, and at Winchester until July 9. Moved to Portland, Me., July 9–13, 1865.

== Casualties ==
The battery lost a total of 43 men during service; 2 officers and 13 enlisted men killed or mortally wounded, 28 enlisted men died of disease.

== Commanders ==
- Captain Albert W. Bradbury
- Captain Albert F. Thomas
- Lieutenant John E. Morton – commanded at the siege of Port Hudson

== See also ==
- List of Maine Civil War units
- Maine in the American Civil War
