= 165th New York Infantry Regiment =

- Active: August 1862 - September 1, 1865
- Country: United States
- Allegiance: Union
- Branch: Infantry Zouaves
- Engagements: Battle of Ponchatoula; Siege of Port Hudson; Second Battle of Sabine Pass; Red River Campaign; Battle of Vermilion Bayou; Battle of Sabine Cross Roads; Battle of Pleasant Hill; Battle of Fort Stevens; First Battle of Deep Bottom

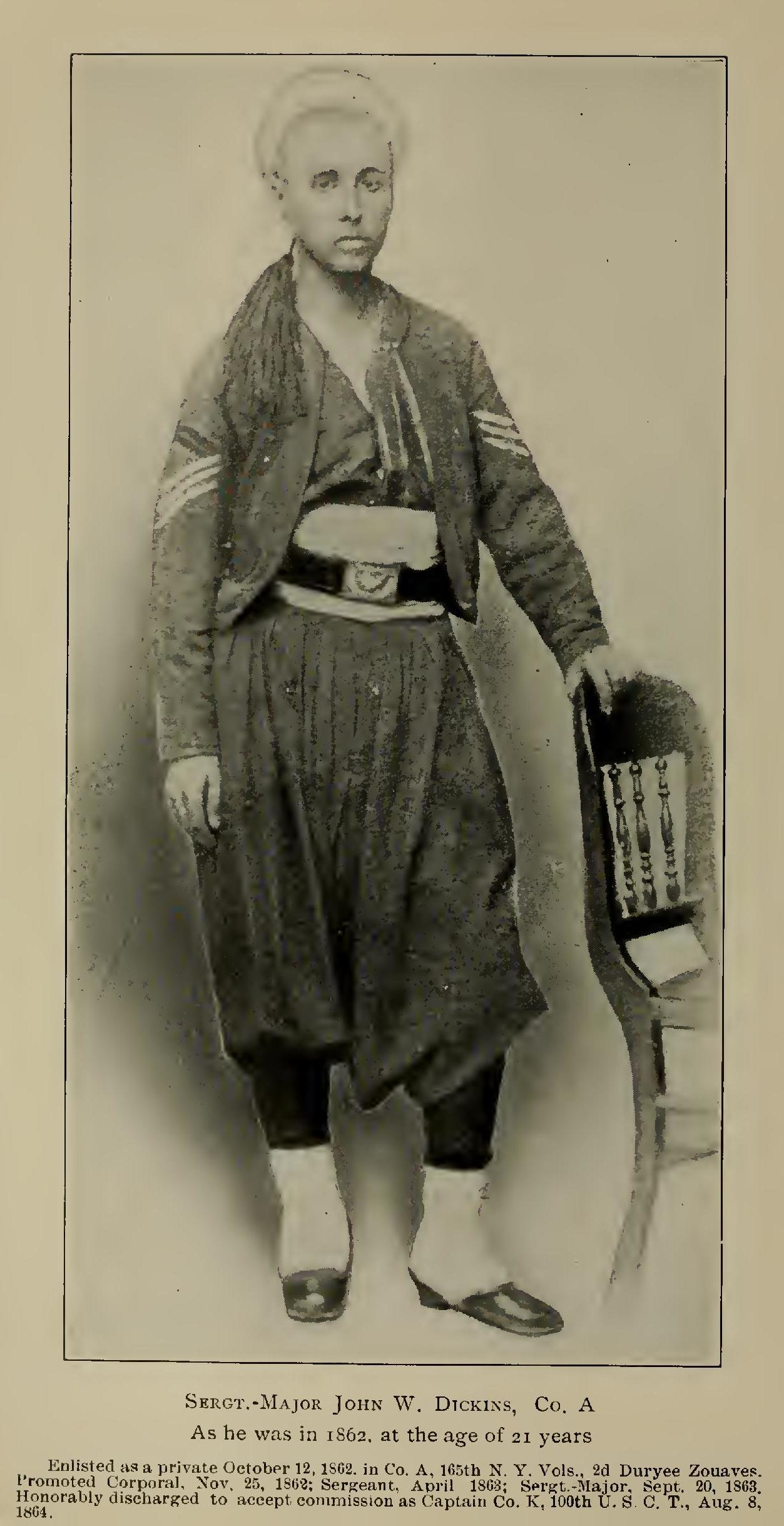
Sergt.-Major John W. Dickins

The 165th New York Infantry Regiment (a.k.a., "2nd Battalion Duryée's Zouaves" and "Smith's Zouaves") was an infantry regiment in the Union Army during the American Civil War.

== Service ==
The 165th New York Infantry was organized at New York City, New York beginning August 1862 and mustered in for three-years service from August through December 1862 under the command of Lieutenant Colonel Abel Smith Jr.. Ten companies were eventually recruited for the regiment, but the last four companies recruited were consolidated with the first six companies.

The 165th New York Infantry was regarded as a sister regiment to the 5th New York Volunteer Infantry. The regiment wore the same uniform as the 5th New York Infantry with the exception of the tassel of the fez, which was dark blue instead of yellow-gold. Photographic evidence suggests that later in the war the 165th New York Infantry was given replacement sashes that were a solid red color without the light blue trim.

The regiment was attached to Independent Command, Department of the Gulf, to January 1863. 3rd Brigade, 2nd Division, XIX Corps, Department of the Gulf, to July 1863. 1st Brigade, 3rd Division, XIX Corps, to February 1864. 3rd Brigade, 1st Division, XIX Corps, Department of the Gulf, to July 1864, and Army of the Shenandoah, Middle Military Division, to February 1865. 3rd Brigade, 1st Provisional Division, Army of the Shenandoah, to April 1865. 3rd Brigade, Dwight's Division, Department of Washington, to June 1865. Dwight's Division, Department of the South, to September 1865.

The 165th New York Infantry mustered out of service September 1, 1865.

== Detailed service ==
Left New York for New Orleans, La., December 2, 1862.

Expedition from New Orleans, La., to Ponchatoula March 21–30, 1863.

Action at North Pass March 23, 1863.

Capture of Ponchatoula March 24, 1863.

Berwick Bay March 26, 1863.

Expedition to Amite River May 7–19, 1863.

Moved to Baton Rouge May 20–24, 1863.

Siege of Port Hudson May 24-July 9, 1863.

Assaults on Port Hudson May 27 and June 14, 1863.

Surrender of Port Hudson July 9, 1863.

Moved to Baton Rouge July 22, 1863 and duty there until September.

Sabine Pass Expedition September 4–11, 1863.

Sabine Pass September 8, 1863.

Moved from Algiers to Brashear City, then to Berwick.

Western Louisiana Campaign October 3-November 30, 1863.

Bayou Vermilion October 9–10, 1863.

Carrion Crow Bayou October 11, 1863.

Bayou Vermilion November 11, 1863.

At New Iberia until January 7, 1864.

Moved to Franklin January 7, 1864 and duty there until March.

Red River Campaign March 10-May 22, 1864.

Advance from Franklin to Alexandria March 14–26, 1864.

Battle of Sabine Cross Roads April 8, 1864.

Pleasant Hill April 9, 1864.

Monett's Ferry, Cane River Crossing, April 23, 1864.

At Alexandria April 26-May 13, 1864.

Construction of dam at Alexandria April 30-May 10, 1864.

Retreat to Morganza May 13–20, 1864.

Mansura May 16, 1864.

Duty at Morganza until July 1864.

Movement to New Orleans, then to Fort Monroe, Va., and Washington, D.C., July 1864.

Sheridan's Shenandoah Valley Campaign August 7-November 28, 1864.

Detached with the brigade as supply train guard for the army August 14 to October 27, 1874.

Duty near Middletown and Newtown until December 1864, and at Stevenson's Depot and Winchester until April 1865.

Moved to Washington, D.C., and duty there until June 1865.

Grand Review of the Armies May 23–24, 1865.

Moved to Savannah, Ga., June 30-July 7, 1865.

Duty Savannah, Ga., and at Charleston, S.C., until September 1865.

== Casualties ==
The regiment lost a total of 124 men during service; 2 officers and 41 enlisted men killed or mortally wounded, 2 officers and 79 enlisted men died of disease.

== Commanders ==
- Lieutenant Colonel Abel Smith Jr. - mortally wounded in action May 27, 1863 during the Siege of Port Hudson
- Lieutenant Colonel Gouverneur Carr
- Lieutenant Colonel William R. French

== Notable members ==
- First Sergeant John Fleming, Company A - Queens County District Attorney and New York judge
- 2nd Lieutenant Abraham G. Mills, Company E - fourth president of the National League of Professional Base Ball Clubs (1883-1884), and is best known for heading the "Mills Commission" which controversially credited Major General Abner Doubleday with the invention of baseball

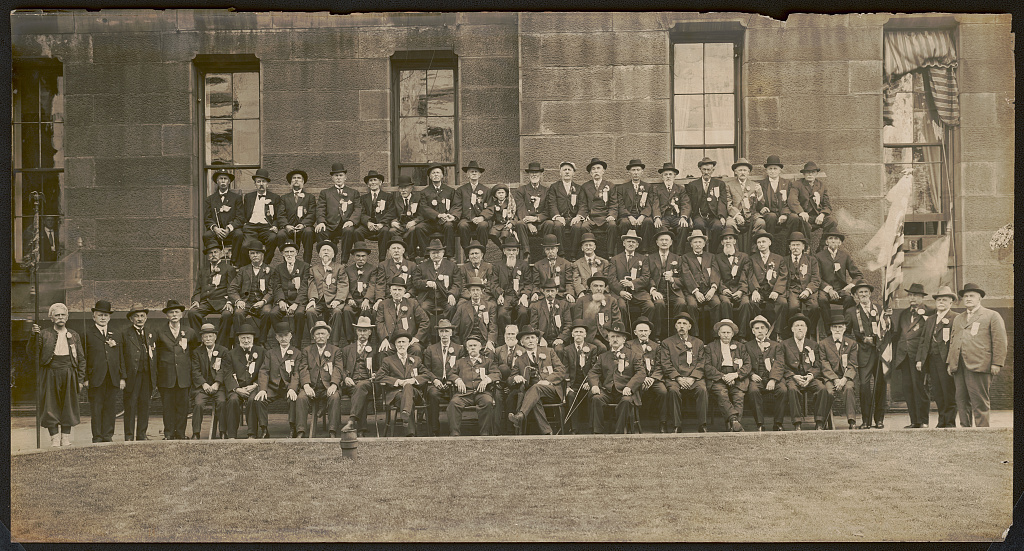
Reunion of veterans of the 165th New York Infantry Regiment

== See also ==
- List of New York Civil War regiments
- New York in the Civil War
