= 26th Connecticut Infantry Regiment =

- Active: November 10, 1862 - August 17, 1863
- Country: United States
- Allegiance: Union
- Branch: Infantry
- Engagements: Siege of Port Hudson

The 26th Connecticut Infantry Regiment was an infantry regiment that served in the Union Army during the American Civil War for nine months service.

== Service ==
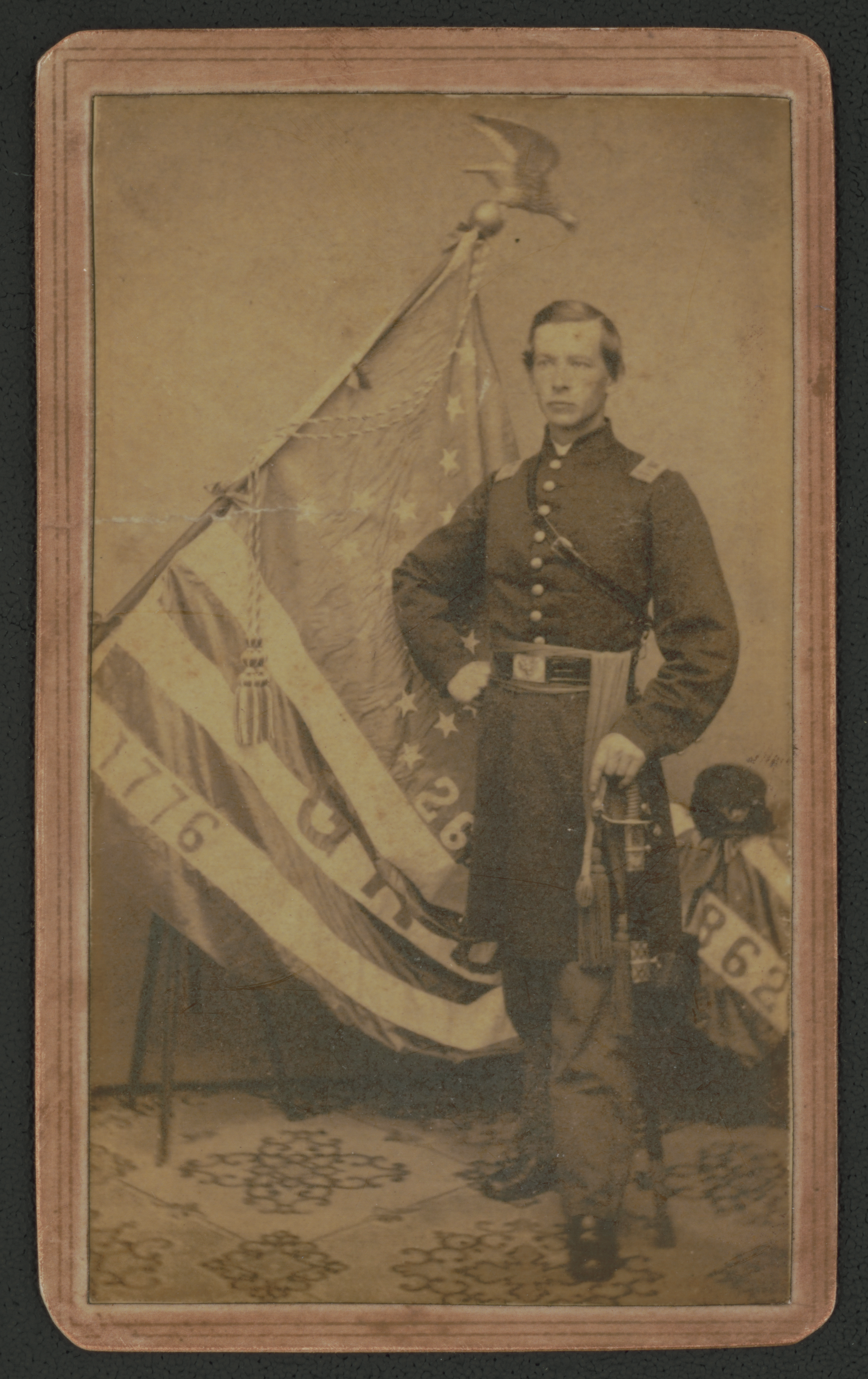
Captain Jedediah Randall, K Company. Died of Wounds sustained at Port Hudson.

The 26th Connecticut Infantry Regiment was organized at Norwich, Connecticut, on November 10, 1862. The regiment was attached to Sherman's Division, Department of the Gulf, to January 1863. And then to the 1st Brigade, 2nd Division, XIX Corps, Department of the Gulf, to August 1863. The 26th Connecticut Infantry mustered out of service August 17, 1863.

Located in Norwich's Little Plain Park (between Broadway and Union Street), sits the 26th Regiment Volunteer Infantry Monument, dedicated in 1902 to honor those who served in the Civil War in late 1862 and mid-1863.

== Detailed service ==
The regiment left Connecticut for eastern New York November 12, then sailed for Ship Island and New Orleans, Louisiana, November 29, arriving there December 16. Subsequently: duty at Camp Parapet until May 1863, moved to Springfield Landing May 20, siege of Port Hudson May 24-July 9, and assaults on Port Hudson May 27 and June 14. Finally, the surrender of Port Hudson on July 9.

== Casualties ==
The regiment lost a total of 145 men during service; 4 officers and 51 enlisted men killed or mortally wounded, 1 officer and 89 enlisted men died of disease.

== Commanders ==
- Colonel Thomas G. Kingsley - Wounded May 27, 1863 during the first assault at Port Hudson.
- Lieutenant Colonel Joseph Selden - commanded during the siege of Port Hudson

== See also ==
- Connecticut in the American Civil War
- List of Connecticut Civil War units
