= 24th Connecticut Infantry Regiment =

- Active: November 18, 1862 - September 30, 1863
- Country: United States
- Allegiance: Union
- Branch: Infantry
- Engagements: Bayou Teche Campaign; Siege of Port Hudson

The 24th Connecticut Infantry Regiment was an infantry regiment that served in the Union Army during the American Civil War for nine months service.

== Service ==
The 24th Connecticut Infantry Regiment was organized at Middletown, Connecticut, on November 18, 1862, under the command of Colonel Samuel M. Mansfield.

The regiment was attached to Grover's Division, Department of the Gulf, to January 1863. 2nd Brigade, 4th Division, XIX Corps, Department of the Gulf, to July 1863. Defenses of New Orleans to August 1863.

The 24th Connecticut Infantry mustered out of service September 30, 1863.

== Detailed service ==
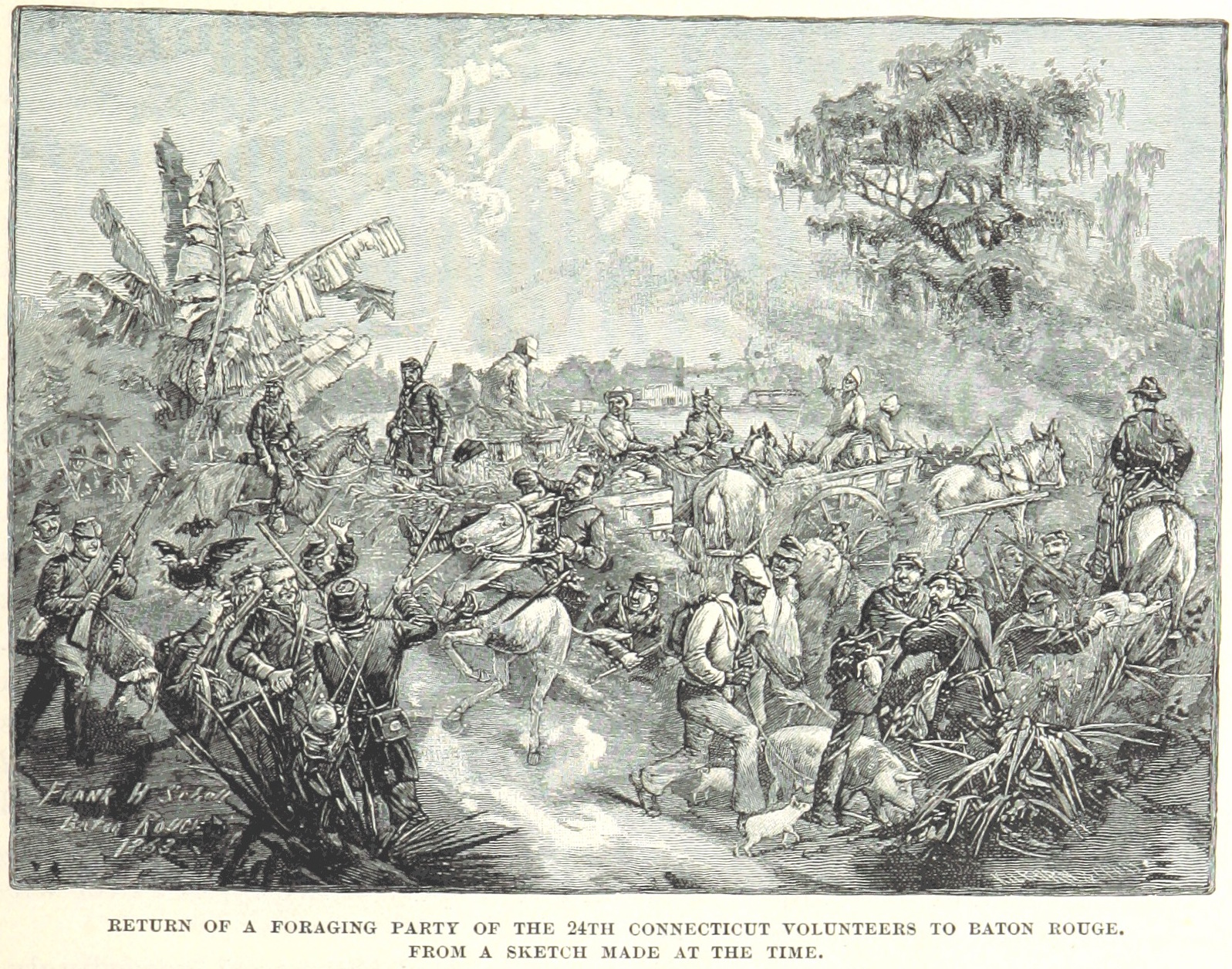
A foraging party of the 24th returns to Baton Rouge

Left Connecticut for eastern New York November 17, then sailed for New Orleans and Baton Rouge, Louisiana, November 29, arriving there December 17. Duty at Baton Rouge until March 1863. Operations against Port Hudson March 7–27. Moved to Donaldsonville March 28. Operations in western Louisiana April 9-May 14. Bayou Teche Campaign April 11–20. Irish Bend April 14. Bayou Vermilion April 17. Expedition to Alexandria and Simsport May 5–18. Destruction of Salt Works, near New Iberia, May 18. Moved to Bayou Sara, then to Port Hudson, May 22–25. Siege of Port Hudson May 25-July 9. Assaults on Port Hudson May 27 and June 14. Surrender of Port Hudson July 9. Ordered to Plaquemine District July 11, and duty there until September.

== Casualties ==
The regiment lost a total of 75 men during service; 16 enlisted men killed or mortally wounded, 2 officers and 57 enlisted men died of disease.

== Commanders ==
- Colonel Samuel M. Mansfield

== See also ==
- Connecticut in the American Civil War
- List of Connecticut Civil War units
