= 52nd Massachusetts Infantry Regiment =

Infantry regiment in the American Civil War

52nd Regiment Massachusetts Volunteer Infantry
- Active: October 11, 1862 – August 14, 1863
- Country: United States
- Allegiance: Union
- Branch: Union Army
- Type: Infantry
- Size: Regiment
- Part of: In 1863: 2nd Brigade, 4th Division, XIX Corps
- Engagements: American Civil War

Commanders
- Colonel: Halbert S. Greenleaf

The 52nd Regiment Massachusetts Volunteer Infantry was a regiment of infantry that served in the Union Army during the American Civil War. It was one of the 18 Massachusetts regiments formed in response to President Abraham Lincoln's August 1862 call for 300,000 men to serve for nine months. The regiment was recruited in Franklin and Hampshire Counties and rendezvoused for mustering in at Camp Miller in Greenfield, Massachusetts. The 52nd Massachusetts was assigned to the Department of the Gulf under Major General Nathaniel P. Banks and shipped for Louisiana. The regiment participated in the Bayou Teche campaign in western Louisiana during April and May 1863 and then saw combat during the Siege of Port Hudson.

== Formation and early duty ==
Companies began assembling at Camp Miller in Greenfield during the last week of September 1862. The final companies were mustered in to federal service on October 11. Halbert S. Greenleaf, a lock manufacturer from Shelburne, Massachusetts, was appointed as colonel and commanding officer. The regiment departed for Louisiana by way of New York City on November 20.

Reaching New York, the 52nd Massachusetts marched to Camp Banks on Long Island which served as a rendezvous for the various regiments assigned to reinforce Gen. Banks's Department of the Gulf in preparation for an expedition against Port Hudson, Louisiana. Unlike other regiments of the expedition force, the 52nd Massachusetts did not have to wait long for a transport. They embarked on the steamship Illinois on December 2. The regiment reached Baton Rouge, Louisiana, on December 17. For the next three months, the unit remained in Baton Rouge (with the exception of four companies briefly detailed on the Placquemines expedition), conducting guard duty and drilling while additional regiments from the North arrived.

On January 3, 1863, four of the ten companies of the 52nd Massachusetts were ordered to prepare immediately for combat and to travel roughly 20 miles downriver to Plaquemine, Louisiana, where Confederates were threatening the Union supply lines. The companies expected to see their first battle but when they arrived, the affair was over and the Confederates had retreated. These four companies remained in Plaquemine for a month conducting picket duty until they were relieved and ordered back to Baton Rouge. The men remembered the duty there as disagreeable due to strong secessionist sentiments in the town, a scarcity of military rations which led to liberal foraging and looting of the surrounding plantations on the part of the troops, and the muddy condition of the roads.

== Reconnaissance to Port Hudson ==
The Union Navy and Army executed a joint operation on March 13 and 14. Admiral David G. Farragut intended to run a fleet up the Mississippi River past the extensive gun emplacements at Port Hudson in order to blockade the Red River. The army's role in this operation was to conduct a [feint] towards Port Hudson, or a reconnaissance-in-force, that would provided a diversion and increase the Navy's chances of success. The 52nd Massachusetts departed Baton Rouge with their brigade on March 12. The next day, they advanced to within a few hundred yards of the Confederate batteries at Port Hudson, moving through deep swamps to probe the enemy's position. They did not engage. Nonetheless, the movement through extremely difficult conditions which put them far in advance of other Union troops earned them commendations from their brigade and division commanders. The battle between the Confederate batteries and Farragut's fleet was remembered as particularly stunning. From their position south of Port Hudson, the Union infantry could not see the ships but could see the tremendous fireballs as several of them exploded. Only two vessels of Farragut's fleet passed Port Hudson. Following this reconnaissance, the 52nd Massachusetts returned to Baton Rouge on March 20.

== Bayou Teche Campaign ==
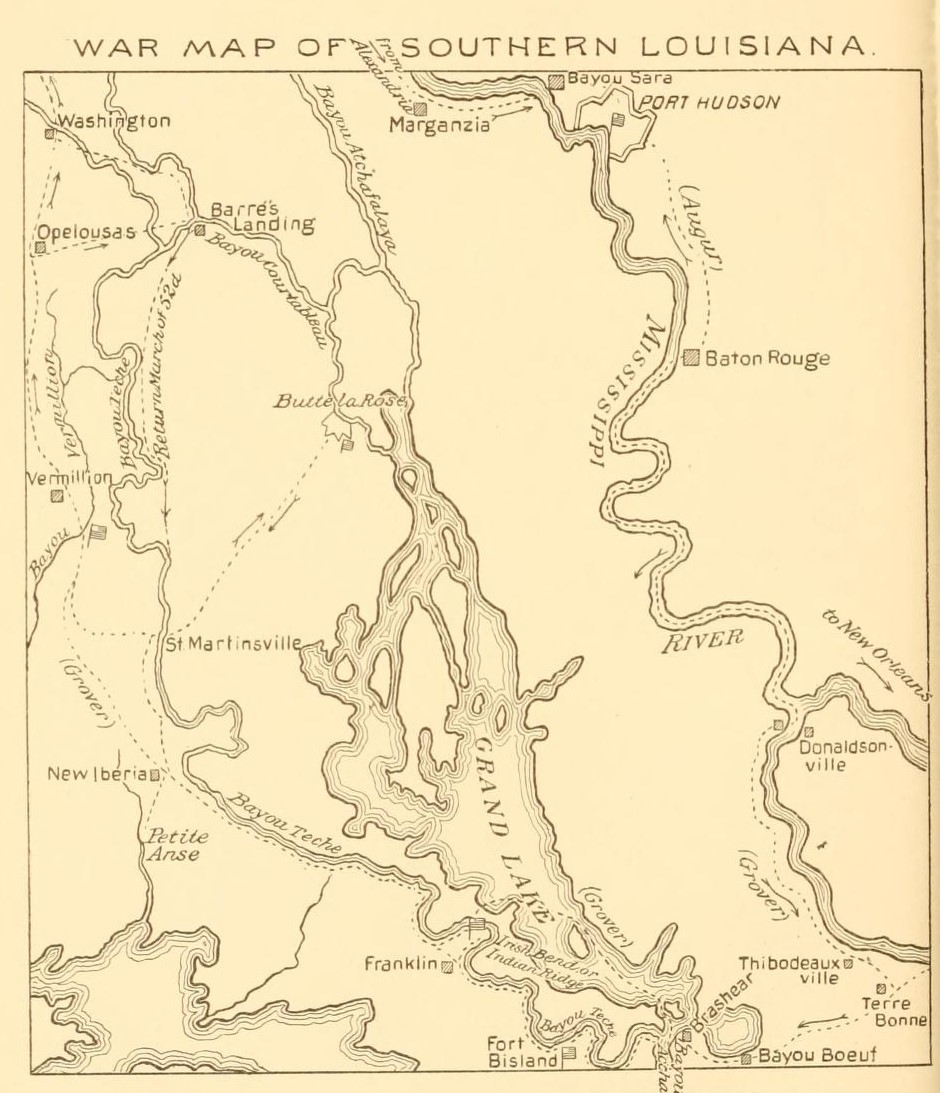
52nd Massachusetts movements in Bayou Teche Campaign, April–May 1863, depicted by dotted line

In preparation for an assault on Port Hudson, Gen. Banks intended to remove the threat posed by Confederate forces in western Louisiana and also to claim forage and supplies in the region. In early April, Banks advanced elements of the XIX Corps into the Bayou Teche region. The 52nd Massachusetts conducted long marches for several days from Baton Rouge to Brashear City (now Morgan City, Louisiana) and by a combination of marching, rail and boat travel, reached Indian Bend just north of Franklin on April 13. Their brigade was part of a flanking force intended to cut off the Confederate retreat during the Battle of Fort Bisland. They were engaged in skirmishing on April 13. They were not engaged in the next day's fighting during the Battle of Irish Bend.

After the Confederates abandoned their position at Fort Bisland and retreated northward, the 52nd Massachusetts was one of the units that marched in pursuit, reaching New Iberia, Louisiana, in two days. Four companies of the regiment remained in New Iberia on provost duty while six went on with other regiments to Opelousas, Louisiana, and from there to Barre's Landing. The advancing Union brigades did not catch up to Major General Richard Taylor's retreating forces.

At Barre's Landing, Union forces found considerable provisions and supplies abandoned by the Confederates including many horses and large quantities of cotton, molasses, and sugar. There were also in this location about four thousand African-American refugees, most of them women and children. The six companies remained in this location for nearly a month until May 21 conducting guard duty, loading and unloading steamships, and caring for the refugees. The four detached companies rejoined them on May 19 and the full regiment marched south from Barre's Landing on May 21 escorting a large wagon train of supplies and a large number of refugees. For the next six days, the regiment marched an average of 18 miles a day and considerably more on the 25th when they doubled back due to false reports of a Confederate advance. On that day, the regiment marched all night—a total of 40 miles—and finally reached Brashear City on May 26.

== Siege of Port Hudson ==
The 52nd Massachusetts did not take part in the first assault on Port Hudson on May 27 due to their assignments in the Bayou Teche region. The regiment left Brashear City for Port Hudson on May 26, arriving on May 30. During the second assault on June 14, the 52nd Massachusetts advanced with their brigade over the extremely rough terrain in front of the Confederate ramparts at Port Hudson. Ditches, many felled trees, large stumps and steep ground made an advance under heavy fire virtually impossible. Their brigade halted at a distance from the fortification, taking cover in a small ravine. From here, the 52nd Massachusetts was deployed as skirmishers, covering about a quarter-mile front, to protect the right flank of the advancing column of brigades. They were ordered to remain in this exposed location even after the main assault failed in order to screen the withdrawing troops. Eventually they retired having lost one man killed and seven wounded.

The 52nd Massachusetts remained on picket duty in an advanced location under the fortifications within rifle shot range of the Confederates on the ramparts. They remained on this duty for roughly three weeks until the Confederate at Port Hudson surrendered on July 9. During their time in this dangerous position, the regiment suffered casualties of nine men killed, twelve wounded, and two captured.

== Mustering out ==
The regiment remained on duty at Port Hudson until July 23 when they were ordered to board a steamship and traveled up the Mississippi River. In making this voyage, they had the honor to be the first Union regiment to travel up the river recently opened by the surrenders of Vicksburg, Mississippi, and Port Hudson. They reached Greenfield, Massachusetts by rail on August 3 and were mustered out of service on August 14. The regiment lost 11 men killed in action or mortally wounded and 101 by disease.

== See also ==
- Massachusetts in the Civil War
- List of Massachusetts Civil War units
