= 110th New York Infantry Regiment =

- Active: May 23, 1862 – August 28, 1865
- Country: United States
- Allegiance: Union
- Type: Infantry
- Engagements: Siege of Port Hudson; Battle of Vermillionville; Battle of Fort Myers (detachment)

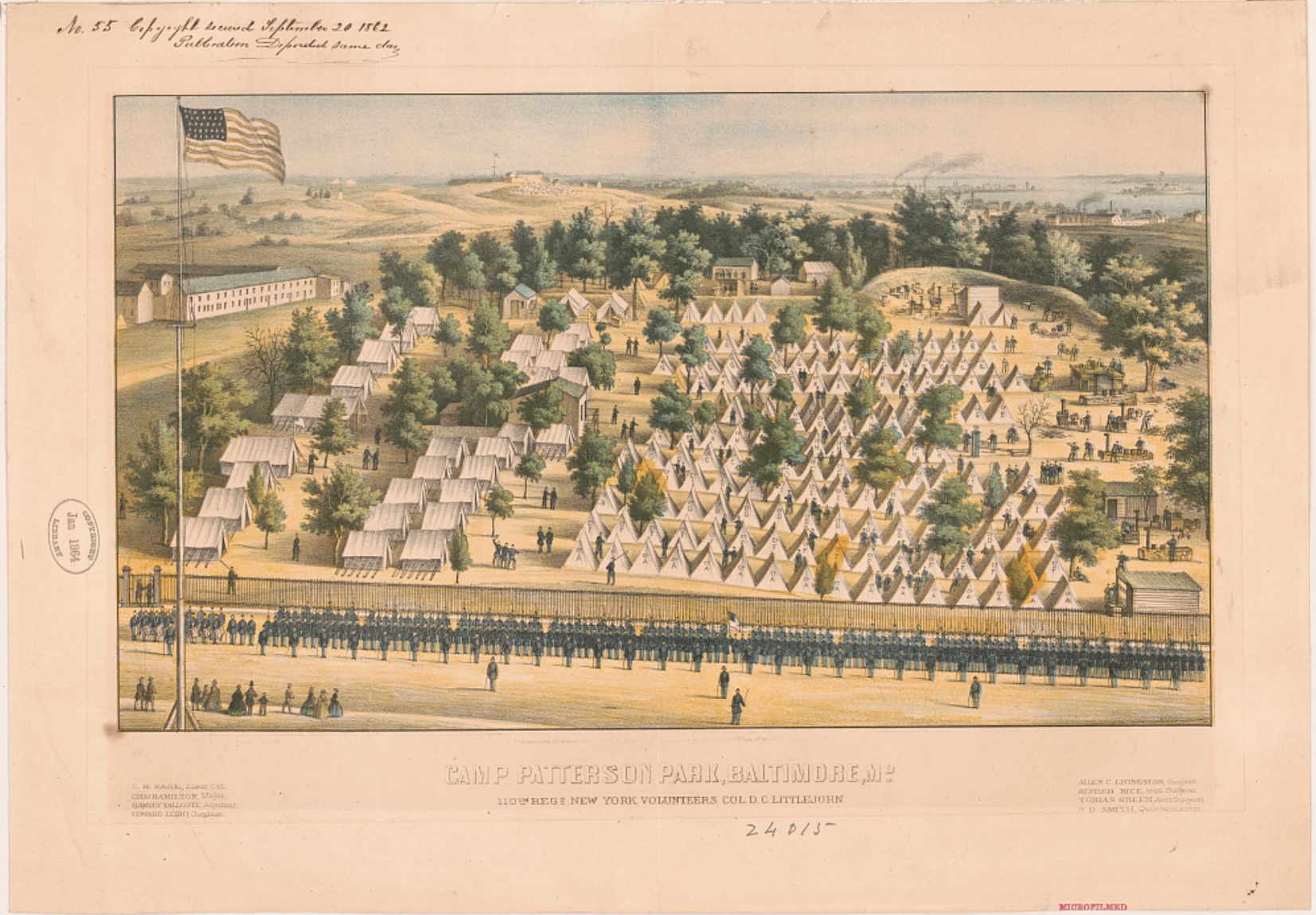
110th Regiment New York Volunteers at Camp Patterson Park, Baltimore, Maryland

The 110th New York Infantry Regiment was an infantry regiment in the Union Army during the American Civil War.

== Service ==
The 110th New York Infantry was organized at Oswego, New York beginning May 23, 1862 and mustered in for three-years service on August 27, 1862 under the command of Colonel DeWitt Clinton Littlejohn.

The regiment was attached to the defenses of Baltimore, Maryland, VIII Corps, Middle Department, to October 1862. Emery's Brigade, VIII Corps, to November 1862. Emery's Brigade, Louisiana Expedition, to December 1862. Sherman's Division, Department of the Gulf, to January 1863. 3rd Brigade, 3rd Division, XIX Corps, Department of the Gulf, to February 1863. 1st Brigade, 3rd Division, XIX Corps, to February 1864. Key West, Florida, District of West Florida, Department of the Gulf, to August 1865.

The 110th New York Infantry mustered out of service on August 28, 1865.

== Detailed service ==
Left New York for Baltimore, Maryland, August 29, 1862. Duty at Baltimore, Maryland, until November 6, 1862. Moved to Fort Monroe, Virginia, November 6, then sailed for New Orleans, Louisiana, December 4, arriving at Carrollton December 26, and duty there until March 1863. Operations on Bayou Plaquemine, February 12–28. Moved to Baton Rouge, Louisiana, March 7. Operations against Port Hudson, Louisiana, March 7–27. Moved to Algiers April 3, then to Brashear City April 8. Expedition to Franklin, April 11–17. Fort Bisland, April 12–13. Franklin, April 14. Expedition from Opelousas to Barre Landing, April 21. Expedition from Barre Landing to Berwick City, May 21–26. Franklin and Centreville, May 25. Moved to Port Hudson, Louisiana, May 30. Siege of Port Hudson, June 3 – July 9. Assault on Port Hudson, June 14. Surrender of Port Hudson, July 9. Duty at Baton Rouge, Donaldsonville, Brashear City, and Berwick until October. Western Louisiana Campaign, October 3 – November 30. Vermillionville, November 11. Duty at New Iberia until January 7, 1864. Moved to Franklin, January 7. Then to Key West, Florida, February 1864, and garrison duty at Fort Jefferson, Florida until August 1865. Attack on Fort Myers, Florida, February 20, 1865 (detachment).

== Casualties ==
The regiment lost a total of 210 men during service; two officers and 14 enlisted men killed or mortally wounded, three officers and 191 enlisted men died of disease.

== Commanders ==
- Colonel DeWitt Clinton Littlejohn
- Colonel Clinton H. Sage
- Colonel Charles Hamilton

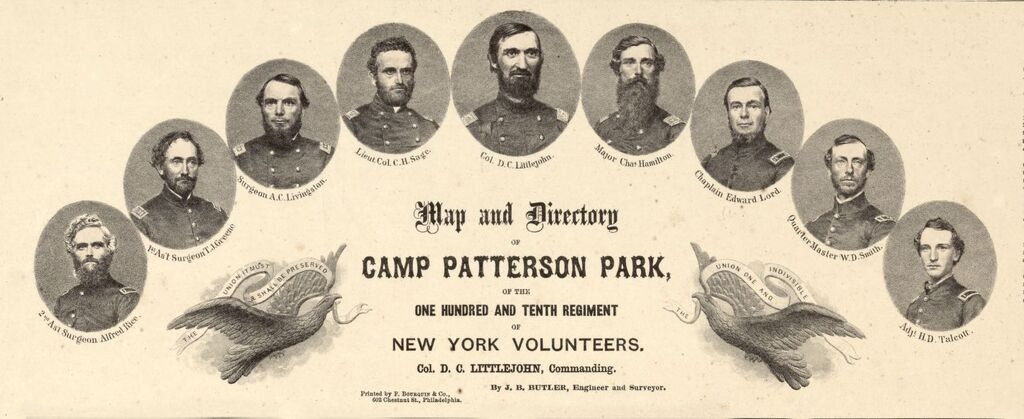
Officers of the 110th New York Volunteer Infantry

== See also ==
- List of New York Civil War regiments
- New York in the Civil War
