= 177th New York Infantry Regiment =

- Active: September 16, 1862 – September 24, 1863
- Country: United States
- Allegiance: Union
- Branch: Infantry
- Engagements: Siege of Port Hudson

The 177th New York Infantry Regiment (a.k.a. "10th New York National Guard") was an infantry regiment in the Union Army during the American Civil War.

== Service ==
The 177th New York Infantry was organized at Albany, New York, on September 16, 1862 when the 10th New York National Guard was accepted for federal service. The regiment mustered in November 21, 1862, for nine-months service under the command of Colonel Ira W. Ainsworth.

The regiment was attached to 3rd Brigade, 2nd Division, XIX Corps, Department of the Gulf, to July 1863. 1st Brigade, 3rd Division, XIX Corps, to September 1863.

The 177th New York Infantry mustered out September 10, 1863 and discharged September 24, 1863.

== Detailed service ==
Ordered to the Department of the Gulf, and left New York for New Orleans, La., December 16, 1862. Duty at New Orleans and Carrollton, Louisiana, until March 1863. Scout to Pass Manchac, February 8–11 (detachment). Advance on Ponchatoula March 21–24. Expedition to Amite River March 24–30. Duty at Bonnet Carre until May 7. Expedition to Amite River May 7–19. Action at Civique's Ferry May 10. Moved to Baton Rouge May 20, then to Port Hudson, Louisiana. Siege of Port Hudson May 24 – July 9. Assaults on Port Hudson May 27 – June 14. Surrender of Port Hudson July 9. Duty at and near Port Hudson until August 22. March to Baton Rouge, then ordered home for muster out.

== Casualties ==
The regiment lost a total of 161 men during service; 2 officers and 7 enlisted men killed or mortally wounded, 3 officers and 149 enlisted men died of disease.

== Commanders ==
- Colonel Ira W. Ainsworth

== See also ==
- List of New York Civil War regiments
- New York in the Civil War

== Work cited ==
- Dyer, Frederick H. A Compendium of the War of the Rebellion (Des Moines, IA: Dyer Pub. Co.), 1908.
- Twombly, Alexander S. The Completed Christian Life: A Sermon Commemorative of Adjt. Richard M. Strong, 177th Regt. N.Y.S.V. Who Died at Bonnet Carré, La., May 12, 1863 (Albany, NY: J. Munsell), 1863.
- -----. Memoir of Richard Marvin Strong: A Member of the Albany Bar, and Adjutant of the 177th Regiment, N.Y. Volunteers, Who Died at Bonnet Carré, La., May 12, 1863 (Albany, NY: C. Van Benthuysen), 1863.

Attribution
