= John B. Van Petten =

American politician

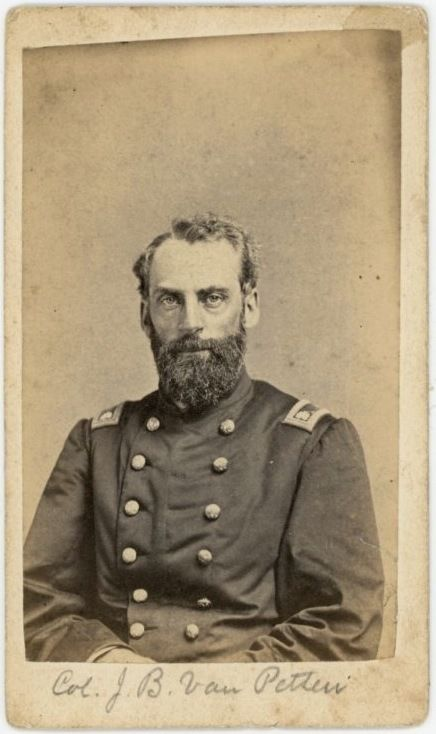
John B. Van Petten

John Bullock Van Petten (June 19, 1827 Sterling, Cayuga County, New York – October 31, 1908) was an American educator, Union Army officer and politician from New York.

== Life ==
He was the son of Peter Van Petten (1777–1829) and Lydia (Bullock) Van Petten (1785–1846). He graduated from Wesleyan University, B.A. in 1850, and M.A. in 1853. He received a Ph.D. in History from and taught at Syracuse University. He was Principal of Fairfield Seminary.

At the outbreak of the American Civil War, he enlisted as Chaplain of the 34th New York Volunteers, but soon took an active part in the fighting, being present at the Battle of Fair Oaks, the Peninsula Campaign and the Second Battle of Bull Run. In the fall of 1862, he became lieutenant colonel of the 160th New York Volunteer Infantry and, in the absence of the colonel, commanded the regiment through the whole campaign in the Department of the Gulf, fighting in the Siege of Port Hudson. In the Third Battle of Winchester he was early severely wounded, but remained in the field until the battle was won. After recovering from his wounds, he became colonel of the 193rd New York Volunteers, and served until the end of the war. In March, 1865, he was brevetted brigadier general.

In February 1866, he left the army, and resumed his position as Principal of Fairfield Seminary. He was a member of the New York State Senate (20th D.) in 1868 and 1869.

From 1885 to 1900, he was Professor of History, Latin and Elocution at Claverack College where his pupil Stephen Crane heard Van Petten's Civil War reminiscences which became the base for The Red Badge of Courage.

== Sources ==
- The New York Civil List compiled by Franklin Benjamin Hough, Stephen C. Hutchins and Edgar Albert Werner (1870; pg. 444)
- Life Sketches of the State Officers, Senators, and Members of the Assembly of the State of New York in 1868 by S. R. Harlow & S. C. Hutchins (pg. 148ff) [gives wrong first name "James"]
- John B. Van Patten at Van Patten ancestry

New York State Senate
Preceded by George H. Andrews	New York State Senate; 20th District; 1868–1869	Succeeded by Augustus R. Elwood
