= 162nd New York Infantry Regiment =

- Active: August 22, 1862 – October 12, 1865
- Country: United States
- Allegiance: Union
- Branch: Infantry
- Engagements: Battle of Plaquemine; Bayou Teche Campaign; Siege of Port Hudson; Battle of Springfield Landing; Battle of Vermilion Bayou; Red River Campaign; Battle of Sabine Cross Roads; Battle of Pleasant Hill; Battle of Mansura; Battle of Monett's Ferry; Siege of Petersburg

The 163rd New York Infantry Regiment (a.k.a. "3rd Metropolitan Guard") was an infantry regiment in the Union Army during the American Civil War.

== Service ==
The 163rd New York Infantry was organized at New York City, New York, beginning August 22, 1862 and mustered in October 14, 1862, under the command of Colonel Lewis Benedict.

The regiment was attached to Abercrombie's Division, Defenses of Washington, D.C., to November 1862. Sherman's Division, Department of the Gulf, to January 1863. 3rd Brigade, 3rd Division, XIX Corps, Department of the Gulf, to March 1863. 1st Brigade, 3rd Division, XIX Corps, to May 1863. 1st Brigade, 2nd Division, XIX Corps, to August 1863. 1st Brigade, 3rd Division, XIX Corps, to February 1864. 3rd Brigade, 1st Division, XIX Corps, Department of the Gulf, to July 1864, and Army of the Shenandoah, Middle Military Division, to February 1865. 3rd Brigade, 1st Provisional Division, Army of the Shenandoah, to April 1865. 3rd Brigade, Dwight's Division, Department of Washington, to June 1865. District of Savannah, Georgia, Department of Georgia, to October 1865.

The 163rd New York Infantry mustered out on October 12, 1865.

== Detailed service ==
Left New York for Washington, D, C., October 24, 1862, then moved to New Orleans, Louisiana, November. Duty at Carrollton, Louisiana, until March 1863. Plaquemine December 31, 1862, and January 3, 1863. Moved to Baton Rouge, Louisiana, March 7 (3 companies). Operations against Port Hudson until March 27. Moved to Algiers April 3, then to Brashear City April 9. Operations in Western Louisiana April 9 – May 14. Bayou Teche Campaign April 11–20. Fort Bisland, near Centreville, April 12–13. Franklin April 14. Expedition from Opelousas to Barre Landing April 21. Advance on Port Hudson, Louisiana, May 17–24. Siege of Port Hudson May 24-July 9. Assaults on Port Hudson May 27 and June 14. Surrender of Port Hudson July 9. Moved to Baton Rouge, Louisiana, and duty there until September. Sabine Pass Expedition September 4–11. Moved from Algiers to Brashear City September 16, then to Berwick September 26. Western Louisiana Campaign October 3 – November 30. At New Iberia until January 7, 1864. Moved to Franklin January 7, and duty there until March. Red River Campaign March 10 – May 22. Advance from Franklin to Alexandria March 14–26. Battle of Sabine Cross Roads April 8. Pleasant Hill April 9. Monett's Ferry, Cane River Crossing, April 23. At Alexandria April 26 – May 13. Retreat to Morganza May 13–20. Mansura May 16. Duty at Morganza until July. Moved to New Orleans, then to Fort Monroe, Virginia, and Washington, D.C., July 1–13. Snicker's Gap Expedition July 14–23. Sheridan's Shenandoah Valley Expedition August 7 – November 28. Detached with the brigade as supply train guard for the army August 14 to October 27. Duty near Middletown and Newtown until December, and at Stephenson's Depot and Winchester until April 1865. Moved to Washington, D.C., and duty there until June. Grand Review of the Armies May 23–24. Moved to Savannah, Georgia, June 30 – July 7. Duty there and at various points in the Department of the South until October.

== Casualties ==
The regiment lost a total of 221 men during service; 8 officers and 58 enlisted men killed or mortally wounded, 3 officers and 152 enlisted men died of disease.

== Commanders ==
- Colonel Lewis Benedict
- Colonel Justus W. Blanchard

== See also ==
- List of New York Civil War regiments
- New York in the Civil War
