= Lewis Benedict =

US Army officer (1817-1864)

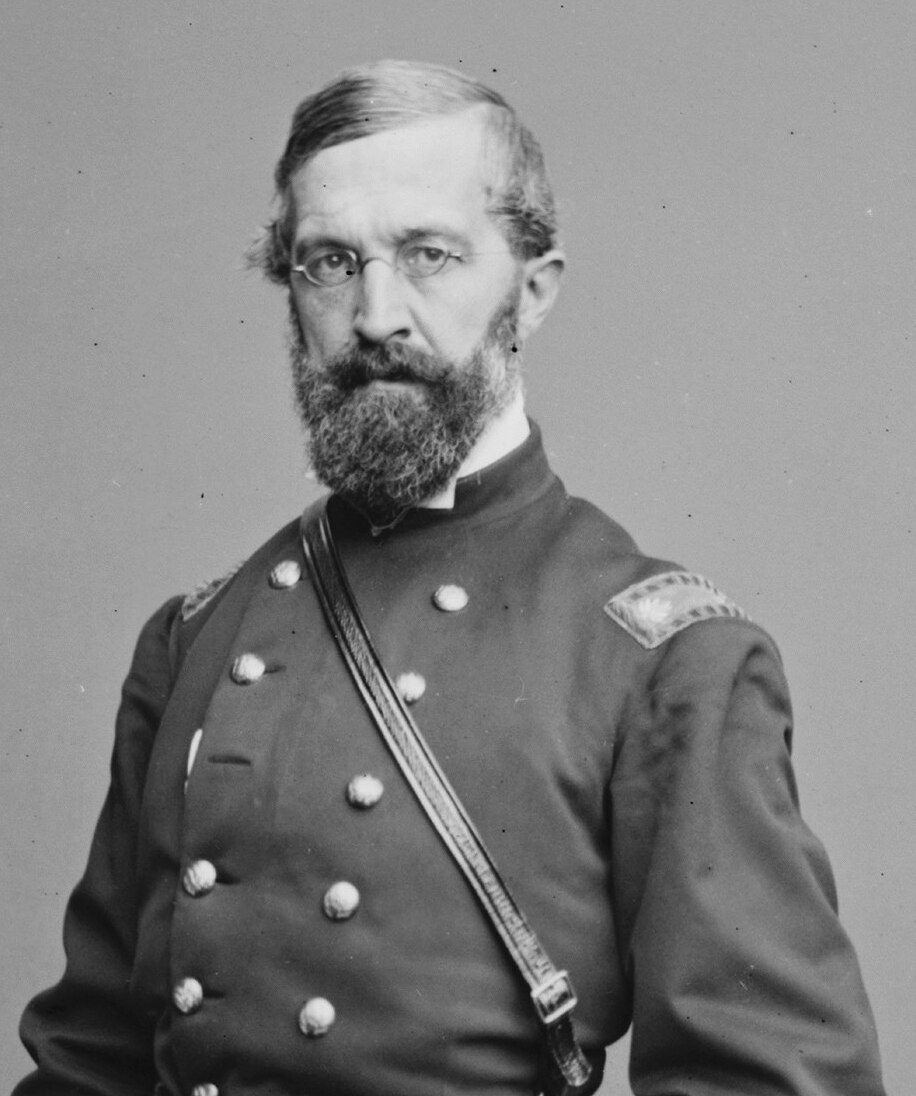
- Portrait of Benedict
- Born: September 2, 1817
- Died: April 9, 1864 (aged 46); Pleasant Hill, Sabine Parish, Louisiana, U.S.
- Military career
- Allegiance: United States of America; Union
- Branch: United States Army; Union Army
- Service years: 1861-1864
- Rank: Colonel; Brevet Brigadier General (posthumous)
- Commands: 162nd New York Volunteer Infantry
- Conflicts: American Civil War; Siege of Port Hudson; Battle of Pleasant Hill †

Lewis Benedict (September 2, 1817 – April 9, 1864) was a politician in New York State and later fought in the American Civil War. He served as a Union colonel and was awarded the rank of brevet brigadier general after his death in the Battle of Pleasant Hill.

== Career ==
Before the American Civil War, Benedict was an Albany city attorney and a New York State Assemblyman. He graduated from Williams College in 1837.

Benedict served during the Civil War as colonel of the 162nd New York Volunteer Infantry. It was recruited under the auspices of the Metropolitan Police at New York City and was part of the Metropolitan Brigade. He was captured at Williamsburg, Virginia, and spent months in various Confederate prisons.

Benedict fought the Siege of Port Hudson in 1863, and was killed in action in April 1864 at the Battle of Pleasant Hill, Louisiana. On March 13, 1865, he was posthumously brevetted brigadier general, U.S. Volunteers for "gallant conduct at Port Hudson, Louisiana".
