= 24th Maine Infantry Regiment =

- Active: October 16, 1862, to August 25, 1863
- Country: United States
- Allegiance: Union
- Branch: Infantry
- Engagements: Siege of Port Hudson

The 24th Maine Infantry Regiment was an infantry regiment that served in the Union Army during the American Civil War.

== Service ==
The 24th Maine Infantry was organized in Augusta, Maine and mustered in October 16, 1862, for a nine month service under the command of Colonel George Marston Atwood.

The regiment left Maine for New York City October 29. Duty at East New York until January 12, 1863. Moved to Fortress Monroe, Virginia, then to New Orleans, Louisiana, January 12-February 14. Attached to 3rd Brigade, 2nd Division, XIX Corps, Department of the Gulf, to July 1863. Moved to Bonnet Carre, Louisiana, February 26, 1863, and served duty there until May. Expedition to Ponchatoula and Amite River March 21–30. Capture of Ponchatoula March 24. Amite River March 28. Expedition to Amite River May 7–21. Civiques Ferry May 10. Advance on Port Hudson May 21–24. Siege of Port Hudson May 24-July 8. Assaults on Port Hudson, May 27 and June 14. Surrender of Port Hudson July 8. Ordered home July 24, 1863.

The 24th Maine Infantry mustered out of service August 25, 1863.

== Casualties ==
The regiment lost a total of 191 men during service; 1 enlisted man killed, 5 officers and 185 enlisted men due to disease.

== Commanders ==
- Colonel George Marston Atwood

== See also ==
- List of Maine Civil War units
- Maine in the American Civil War
