= 160th New York Infantry Regiment =

- Active: September 6, 1862 - November 1, 1865
- Country: United States
- Allegiance: Union
- Branch: Infantry
- Engagements: Bayou Teche Campaign; Battle of Pattersonville (detachment); Battle of Fort Bisland; Siege of Port Hudson; Red River Campaign; Battle of Pleasant Hill; Battle of Sabine Cross Roads; Battle of Fort Stevens; Third Battle of Winchester; Battle of Cedar Creek

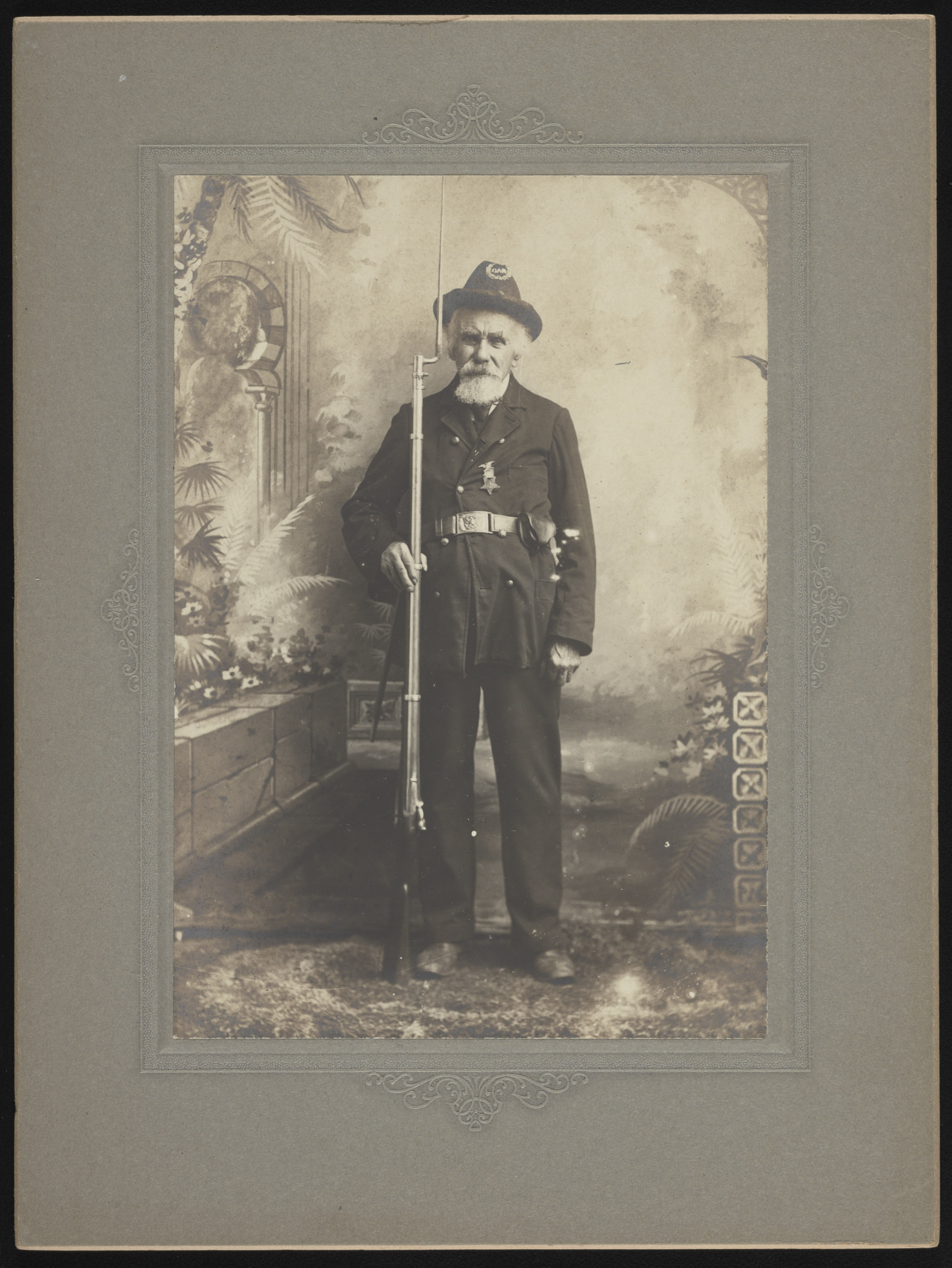
Andrew J. Hauenstein of Co. I, 160th New York Infantry Regiment. From the Liljenquist Family Collection of Civil War Photographs, Prints and Photographs Division, Library of Congress

The 160th New York Infantry Regiment was an infantry regiment in the Union Army during the American Civil War.

== Service ==
The 160th New York Infantry was organized at Auburn, New York beginning September 6, 1862 and mustered in for three-years service on November 21, 1862 under the command of Colonel Charles C. Dwight.

The regiment was attached to Sherman's Division, Department of the Gulf, to January 1863. 2nd Brigade, 1st Division, XIX Corps, Department of the Gulf, to July 1863. 3rd Brigade, 1st Division, XIX Corps, to February 1864. 2nd Brigade, 1st Division, XIX Corps, to June 1864. 3rd Brigade, 1st Division, XIX Corps, Army of the Gulf, to July 1864, and Army of the Shenandoah, Middle Military Division, to February 1865. 3rd Brigade, 1st Provisional Division, Army of the Shenandoah, to April 1865. 3rd Brigade, Dwight's Division, Department of Washington, to June 1865. 3rd Brigade, Dwight's Division, Department of the South, to November 1865.

The 160th New York Infantry mustered out of service November 1, 1865.

== Detailed service ==
Left New York for New Orleans, La., December 4, 1862. Expedition to Bayou Teche January 12–15, 1863. Aboard steamer Cotton January 14. Operations on Bayou Plaquemine February 12–28. Duty at Brashear City until March 20. Berwick City March 13. Duty at Bayou Boeuf and Pattersonville until April 2. Pattersonville March 28 (detachment). Operations in western Louisiana April 9-May 14. Second Bayou Teche Campaign April 11–20. Fort Bisland, near Centreville, April 12–13. Jeanerette April 14. Bayou Vermilion April 17. Opelousas April 20. Expedition to Alexandria and Simsport May 5–18. Moved to Port Hudson May 18–25. Siege of Port Hudson May 25-July 9. Assaults on Port Hudson May 27 and June 14. Springfield Landing July 2. Surrender of Port Hudson July 9. Expedition to Donaldsonville July 10–30. Kock's Plantation, Donaldsonville, on Bayou Fourche, July 13–14. Duty near Thibodeaux and at Brashear City until September 2. Sabine Pass Expedition September 4–12. Sabine Pass September 8. Moved to Algiers, then to Berwick September 17. Western Louisiana Campaign October 3-November 30. Vermilion Bayou October 9–10. Carrion Crow Bayou October 11. At New Iberia until January 7, 1864. Moved to Franklin January 7, and duty there until March. Red River Campaign March 10-May 22. Advance from Franklin to Alexandria March 14–26. Battle of Sabine Cross Roads April 8. Pleasant Hill April 9. Monett's Ferry or Cane River Crossing April 23. At Alexandria April 26-May 13. Construction of dam at Alexandria April 30-May 10. Retreat to Mansura May 13–20. Avoyelle's Prairie, Mansura, May 16. At Morganza until July. Moved to Fort Monroe, Va., then to Washington, D.C. July 1–12. Repulse of Early's attack on Washington July 12–13. Pursuit of Early to Snicker's Gap, Va., July 14–23. Snicker's Ferry July 20. Sheridan's Shenandoah Valley Campaign August 7-November 28. Served detached as supply train guard for the army from August 14 to October 27. Duty at Middletown and Newtown until December, and at Stephenson's Depot and Winchester until April 1865. Moved to Washington, D.C., and duty there until June. Grand Review of the Armies May 23–24. Moved to Savannah, Ga., June 30-July 7. Duty there and at various points in the Department of Georgia until November.

== Casualties ==
The regiment lost a total of 219 men during service; 6 officers and 53 enlisted men killed or mortally wounded, 1 officer and 159 enlisted men died of disease.

== Commanders ==
- Colonel Charles C. Dwight - discharged May 25, 1865
- Colonel Henry P. Underhill
- Lieutenant Colonel John B. Van Petten - commanded during the Siege of Port Hudson

== See also ==
- List of New York Civil War regiments
- New York in the Civil War
