= 1st Louisiana Infantry Regiment (Union) =

1st Louisiana Regiment Infantry
- Active: July 30, 1862 – December 18, 1865
- Country: United States of America
- Allegiance: USA
- Branch: Union Army, American Civil War
- Type: Infantry
- Engagements: Siege of Port Hudson; Red River Campaign

Commanders
- Port Hudson: Ltc William O. Fiske

The 1st Louisiana Regiment Infantry was a regiment in the Union Army during the American Civil War.

== Service ==
The unit was organized at New Orleans, Louisiana, on July 30, 1862, and remained on duty there until January, 1863. They then moved to Baton Rouge where they remained until March, after which they participated in operations against Port Hudson, and in the Siege of Port Hudson culminating in the surrender on July 9, 1863.

The regiment participated in the Red River Campaign from March to May, 1864.

The unit mustered out on July 12, 1865.

== See also ==
- List of Louisiana Union Civil War units
