= 14th Maine Infantry Regiment =

- Active: December 31, 1861, to January 13, 1865
- Country: United States
- Allegiance: Union
- Branch: Infantry
- Engagements: Baton Rouge; Civiques Ferry; Port Hudson; Winchester; Fishers Hill; Cedar Creek

The 14th Maine Infantry Regiment was mustered in for three years' service on December 31, 1861, and was mustered out on January 13, 1865. During its service, 86 men were killed or died of wounds, 332 died from disease.

== Service in Louisiana ==
The 14th Maine Infantry Regiment was organized at Augusta, Maine, and mustered in on December 31, 1861. The regiment left the state for Boston, Massachusetts, on February 5, 1862, and there embarked on February 6 on the steamer "North America." They arrived at Ship Island, Mississippi, on March 8. The regiment was attached to Butler's New Orleans Expeditionary Corps, January 1862.

The Regiment remained at Ship Island until May 19, 1862, then moved to New Orleans, Louisiana, from May 19 to 25. They remained on duty there until July 7. They moved to Baton Rouge, Louisiana, on July 7. An expedition to the Amite River was carried out between July 23 and 25 by Companies "F" and "K". The Regiment participated in the Battle of Baton Rouge on August 5. The 14th Maine Volunteer Infantry Regiment is the focus of the poem "On the Men of Maine killed in the Victory of Baton Rouge, Louisiana" written by Herman Melville.

They moved to Carrollton on August 20, and remained on duty there until December 13, 1862. During this time they went to Bayou des Allemands on September 4 to 5 and an expedition to St. Charles September 7 to 8.

On December 13, 1862, they moved to Bonnet Carre and remained on duty there until May 7, 1863. During this time, Company "H" detached at Frenier December 14, 1862, to January 6, 1863. Company "B" detached December 14 to February 20 and Company "E" January 6 to April 11. A detachment made a scouting expedition to Pass Manchac February 8–11, 1863. There was an expedition to Ponchatoula March 21–24, which led to its capture on March 24 by Company E. The regiment made expeditions to the Amite River March 24–30 and May 7–19 and then on to Civiques Ferry on May 10 and Baton Rouge

The move on Port Hudson began May 20–22 with the siege of Port Hudson May 24-July 8. Assaults were made on May 27 and June 14 with the surrender of Port Hudson July 8. The regiment moved back to Baton Rouge on July 22.

The Sabine Pass Expedition took place September 4–11 and after that the Western Louisiana ("Teche") Campaign October 3-November 30. The Regiment was on duty at New Iberia, Louisiana, until January 7, 1864. They then moved to Franklin on January 7and on January 16 back to New Orleans where they remained on duty at Camp Parapet until May 5. Veterans were Furloughed between February 10 and April 19.

The Regiment moved to Baton Rouge on May 5 and remained on duty there until June 1. They moved to Morganza, Louisiana, and were on duty there until July 3.

== Service in Virginia ==
Disembarking from Algiers, the regiment traveled to Virginia, first to Fort Monroe and then the Bermuda Hundred between July 3 and 22. They remained in the trenches at Bermuda Hundred until July 28.

A demonstration was made north of the James River July 28–29 prior to Deep Bottom July 28–30. The Regiment moved to Washington, D.C., July 31, and thereafter to Tennallytown, Maryland, on August 2.

The Regiment participated in Sheridan's Shenandoah Valley Campaign from August 7 to November 28, 1864, including Berryville September 3–4, the Battle of Opequon, Winchester on September 19, the Battle of Fisher's Hill on September 22, and the Battle of Cedar Creek October 19.

The Regiment remained at Cedar Creek until November 9, then moved to Kernstown, Virginia, until November 24.

After some time guarding trains at Martinsburg, West Virginia, they moved to Camp Russell on December 1, and remained on duty there until December 22.

Non-Veterans left front for muster out December 22. Mustered out January 13, 1865. Veterans and Recruits consolidated to a Battalion of four Companies, and duty at Stevenson's Depot till January 6, 1865. They then moved to Savannah, Georgia, between January 6 and 20. They were on provost duty there until May 6. They marched to Augusta, Georgia, from May 6 to 14, and then on to Savannah between May 31 and June 7. They then moved to Darien June 9–10.

The regiment was mustered out on August 28, 1865.

== See also ==
- List of Maine Civil War units
- Maine in the American Civil War
