= Thomas W. Sherman =

Union Army general (1813–1879)

- Portrait by Brady c. 1861–1865
- Born: March 26, 1813; Newport, Rhode Island
- Died: March 16, 1879 (aged 65); Newport, Rhode Island
- Burial place: Island Cemetery, Newport, Rhode Island
- Military career
- Allegiance: United States of America; Union
- Branch: United States Army; Union Army
- Service years: 1836–1870
- Rank: Brigadier General; Brevet Major General
- Nickname: Tim
- Commands: 3rd U.S. Artillery Regiment; 1st Division, Army of the Ohio; 2nd Division, XIX Corps
- Conflicts: Second Seminole War; Mexican–American War; Battle of Buena Vista; American Civil War; Battle of Port Royal; Siege of Corinth; Siege of Port Hudson

Thomas West Sherman (March 26, 1813 – March 16, 1879) was a United States Army officer with service during the Mexican–American War and the American Civil War. While some contemporaries mistakenly identified him as the brother of the more famous General William T. Sherman, modern scholarship notes that the two were not closely related.

== Early career ==
Sherman, known to his friends as "Tim", was born in Newport, Rhode Island, the son of Elijah and Martha (West) Sherman. His desire to attend the United States Military Academy at West Point was so strong that he walked from Newport to Washington, D.C. to secure a Congressional appointment.

Sherman graduated from West Point on July 1, 1836, and was commissioned a second lieutenant in the 3rd U.S. Artillery Regiment. Sherman would serve the bulk of his career with the 3rd Artillery and eventually became its commander.

His early career included service in the Florida Wars against the Seminoles from 1836 to 1838 and in the Cherokee Nation in 1838 while transferring the Native Americans to the West.

He was promoted to first lieutenant on March 14, 1838. He served again in the Florida War from 1838 to 1842 and on recruiting service in 1842.

He served at Fort Moultrie, South Carolina from 1842 to 1844 and was again on recruiting service from 1844 to 1846. He was promoted to captain on May 28, 1846.

== Mexican–American War ==
During the War with Mexico he took a distinguished part in the Battle of Buena Vista on February 23, 1847, leading his battery in a defensive action helping to stop the Mexican attack, and was brevetted to major "for Gallant and Meritorious Conduct" during the battle.

He was assigned to Fort Trumbull in New London, Connecticut in 1848 and then to Fort Adams in Newport from 1849 to 1853.

He was then on frontier duty at Fort Snelling, Minnesota from 1853 to 1857 and was in command of expedition to Yellow Medicine, Minnesota in 1857. He was involved in quelling the Kansas Border Disturbances in 1857 to 1858 and the Artillery School for Practice at Fort Ridgely, Minnesota from 1858 to 1861, except while in command of the expedition to Kettle Lake, Dakota in 1859.

== Family ==
In 1858, Sherman married Mary Hannah Shannon, the daughter of Wilson Shannon, who had served as Governor of Ohio and Governor of Kansas Territory. They were the parents of a son, Wilson Shannon Sherman (1860–1936). Mary Shannon Sherman died from surgical complications just four days before her husband's death.

News stories in 1910 indicated that Wilson Sherman had not been heard from since the early 1890s, and that attorneys and police in Washington, DC and Newport were attempting to locate him. The effort to locate Wilson Sherman was undertaken because he was the only heir to his parents' estate, a large part of which had been held for him since their deaths. By the time of his death in 1936, he was living at the Masonic Home in Charlton, Massachusetts.

== Civil War ==
At the start of the Civil War, Sherman was serving as a major in the 3rd Artillery when President Abraham Lincoln appointed him to the grade of brigadier general of volunteers on August 6, 1861, to rank from May 17, 1861. Sherman's nomination to the grade of brigadier general of volunteers was sent by President Abraham Lincoln to the United States Senate on July 31, 1861, and the Senate confirmed the appointment on August 3, 1861. He assumed command of the ground forces in the Port Royal Expedition. Sherman and the naval force under Flag Officer Samuel F. du Pont captured Port Royal in a combined Army/Navy operation.

After briefly commanding the Department of the South, Sherman was sent to the Western Theater. He took command of Major General George H. Thomas's division during the Siege of Corinth when the latter assumed command of the right wing of Major General Henry W. Halleck's army group. After that he commanded the Defenses of New Orleans before taking command of a division in Major General Nathaniel P. Banks's army, which he led into action at the Siege of Port Hudson.

During the May 27, 1863 attack on Port Hudson, Sherman was severely wounded, which led to the amputation of his right leg. His injuries were so severe that he was not expected to live, and the newspaper in his hometown of Newport, Rhode Island, printed an extensive obituary for him. For the rest of the war he held administrative commands in Louisiana. Sherman was mustered out of the volunteers on April 30, 1866.

In recognition of his heroism and services, President Andrew Johnson nominated Sherman for appointment to the grade of brevet major general of volunteers to rank from March 13, 1865, and the United States Senate confirmed the appointment on March 12, 1866. On June 30, 1866, President Johnson nominated Sherman to be appointed to the rank of brevet major general of the United States Army (i.e. Regular Army), to rank from March 13, 1865, and the Senate confirmed the appointment on July 25, 1866.

== Post war ==
On February 5, 1868, Sherman was elected as a First Class Companion of the Pennsylvania Commandery of the Military Order of the Loyal Legion of the United States and was assigned insignia number 643. He was also, most probably, a member of the Grand Army of the Republic.

After Sherman was mustered out of volunteer service on April 30, 1866, he reverted to his Regular Army grade of colonel and was placed in command of the 3rd Artillery Regiment.

He served in command of his regiment and the post of Fort Adams, in Newport from July 29, 1866, to February 1869. He was in temporary command of the Department of the East from January to July 16, 1868. His final assignment was in command of his regiment and Fort Taylor in Key West, Florida from February 1869 to November 29, 1870.

Sherman retired from active service on December 31, 1870, as a major-general for "Disability caused by the Loss of a Leg in Battle".

Sherman lived at his home named "Twin Beeches" on Catherine Street in Newport until he died there on March 16, 1879, at the age of 66. He is buried in the Island Cemetery in Newport.

== Legacy ==
In 2017, Major General Thomas West Sherman Camp 1 was chartered by the Sons of Union Veterans of the Civil War (SUVCW). Camp 1 serves as the local chapter of the SUVCW in Newport County, Rhode Island.

== Dates of rank ==
Insignia	Rank	Component	Date
No insignia	Cadet	United States Military Academy	1 July 1832
	Second Lieutenant	3rd Artillery	1 July 1836
	First Lieutenant	3rd Artillery	14 March 1838
	Captain	3rd Artillery	28 May 1846
	Major	Brevet	23 February 1847
	Major	3rd Artillery	27 April 1861
	Lieutenant Colonel	5th Artillery	14 May 1861
	Brigadier General	Volunteers	17 May 1861
	Colonel	3rd Artillery	1 June 1863
	Brigadier General	Brevet	13 March 1865
	Major General	Brevet (Volunteers)	13 March 1865
	Major General	Brevet	13 March 1865
	Colonel	3rd Artillery	30 April 1866 (Mustered out of Volunteers, reverted to permanent rank.)
	Major General	Retired list	31 December 1870

- Cadet, United States Military Academy – 1 July 1832
- 2nd Lieutenant, 3rd Artillery – 1 July 1836
- 1st Lieutenant, 3rd Artillery – 14 March 1838
- Captain, 3rd Artillery – 28 May 1846
- Brevet Major – 23 February 1847
- Major, 3rd Artillery – 27 April 1861
- Lieutenant Colonel, 5th Artillery – 14 May 1861
- Brigadier General, Volunteers – 17 May 1861
- Colonel, 3rd Artillery – 1 June 1863
- Brevet Brigadier General, USA – 13 March 1865
- Brevet Major General, Volunteers – 13 March 1865
- Brevet Major General, USA – 13 March 1865
- Mustered out of Volunteers – 30 April 1866
- Retired with rank of Major General, USA – 31 December 1870

== See also ==
- Battle of Fort Pulaski, The Plan. T. Sherman approved Gillmore's plan for successful siege.
- List of American Civil War generals (Union)
