= Red River campaign order of battle: Confederate =

Something interesting

The following is the organization of the Confederate forces engaged in the Red River campaign, during the American Civil War in 1864. Order of battle shows the army organization during the campaign. The Union order of battle is listed separately.

== Abbreviations ==
=== Military rank ===
- LG = Lieutenant General
- MG = Major General
- BG = Brigadier General
- Col = Colonel
- Ltc = Lieutenant Colonel
- Maj = Major
- Cpt = Captain
- Lt = 1st Lieutenant

=== Other ===
- w = wounded
- mw = mortally wounded
- k = killed
- c = captured
- 10-pdr PR = 10-pounder Parrott rifle
- 12-pdr Nap = M1857 12-pounder Napoleon
- 12-pdr how = M1841 12-pounder howitzer
- 3.8" JR = 3.8-inch James rifle
- 30-pdr PR = 30-pounder Parrott rifle
- 6-pdr gun = M1841 6-pounder field gun

== District of West Louisiana ==
LG Richard Taylor (Note: Taylor's superior was General Edmund Kirby Smith whose account stated that he arrived at 2 am after the Battle of Mansfield on 8 April 1864. Smith did not mention who was in overall command at the Battle of Pleasant Hill,(Battles & Leaders, p. 372) but another account assumed Taylor was in charge. (Battles & Leaders, p. 355))

=== Infantry ===
Taylor's corps
Division	Brigade	Regiments and others
Walker's Infantry Division; MG John G. Walker	1st Brigade; BG Thomas N. Waul	12th Texas Infantry Regiment: Col Overton C. Young
Walker's Infantry Division; MG John G. Walker	1st Brigade; BG Thomas N. Waul	18th Texas Infantry Regiment: Col William H. King
Walker's Infantry Division; MG John G. Walker	1st Brigade; BG Thomas N. Waul	22nd Texas Infantry Regiment: Col Richard B. Hubbard
Walker's Infantry Division; MG John G. Walker	1st Brigade; BG Thomas N. Waul	13th Texas Cavalry Regiment (dismounted): Col Anderson F. Crawford
Walker's Infantry Division; MG John G. Walker	1st Brigade; BG Thomas N. Waul	Haldeman's Texas Battery: Cpt Horace Haldeman
Walker's Infantry Division; MG John G. Walker	2nd Brigade; BG Horace Randal	11th Texas Infantry Regiment: Col Oran M. Roberts
Walker's Infantry Division; MG John G. Walker	2nd Brigade; BG Horace Randal	14th Texas Infantry Regiment: Col Edward Clark
Walker's Infantry Division; MG John G. Walker	2nd Brigade; BG Horace Randal	28th Texas Cavalry Regiment (dismounted): Col Eli H. Baxter
Walker's Infantry Division; MG John G. Walker	2nd Brigade; BG Horace Randal	6th Texas Cavalry Battalion (dismounted): Ltc Robert S. Gould
Walker's Infantry Division; MG John G. Walker	2nd Brigade; BG Horace Randal	Daniel's Texas Battery: Cpt James M. Daniel
Walker's Infantry Division; MG John G. Walker	3rd Brigade; BG William R. Scurry	3rd Texas Infantry Regiment: Col Philip N. Luckett (Note: 3rd Texas Infantry remained at Shreveport. (Kiper, p. 180))
Walker's Infantry Division; MG John G. Walker	3rd Brigade; BG William R. Scurry	16th Texas Infantry Regiment: Col George Flournoy
Walker's Infantry Division; MG John G. Walker	3rd Brigade; BG William R. Scurry	17th Texas Infantry Regiment: Col George W. Jones
Walker's Infantry Division; MG John G. Walker	3rd Brigade; BG William R. Scurry	19th Texas Infantry Regiment: Col Richard Waterhouse
Walker's Infantry Division; MG John G. Walker	3rd Brigade; BG William R. Scurry	16th Texas Cavalry Regiment (dismounted): Col William Fitzhugh
Walker's Infantry Division; MG John G. Walker	3rd Brigade; BG William R. Scurry	1st Texas Field Battery: Cpt William Edgar (Note: Edgar's Battery was captured at the Battle of Henderson's Hill on 21 March 1864. (Kiper, p. 180))
Mouton's Infantry Division; BG Alfred Mouton (k); BG Camille de Polignac	Polignac's Brigade; BG Camille de Polignac; Col James R. Taylor (k); Ltc Robert D. Stone (k)	15th Texas Infantry Regiment: Ltc James E. Harrison
Mouton's Infantry Division; BG Alfred Mouton (k); BG Camille de Polignac	Polignac's Brigade; BG Camille de Polignac; Col James R. Taylor (k); Ltc Robert D. Stone (k)	17th Texas Cavalry Regiment (dismounted): Col James R. Taylor
Mouton's Infantry Division; BG Alfred Mouton (k); BG Camille de Polignac	Polignac's Brigade; BG Camille de Polignac; Col James R. Taylor (k); Ltc Robert D. Stone (k)	22nd Texas Cavalry Regiment (dismounted): Ltc Robert D. Stone
Mouton's Infantry Division; BG Alfred Mouton (k); BG Camille de Polignac	Polignac's Brigade; BG Camille de Polignac; Col James R. Taylor (k); Ltc Robert D. Stone (k)	31st Texas Cavalry Regiment (dismounted): Maj Frederick Malone
Mouton's Infantry Division; BG Alfred Mouton (k); BG Camille de Polignac	Polignac's Brigade; BG Camille de Polignac; Col James R. Taylor (k); Ltc Robert D. Stone (k)	34th Texas Cavalry Regiment (dismounted): Ltc John H. Caudle
Mouton's Infantry Division; BG Alfred Mouton (k); BG Camille de Polignac	Gray's Brigade; Col Henry Gray	18th Louisiana Infantry Regiment: Col Leopold L. Armant (k)
Mouton's Infantry Division; BG Alfred Mouton (k); BG Camille de Polignac	Gray's Brigade; Col Henry Gray	Crescent (24th) Louisiana Regiment: Col J. H. Beard (k) (Note: All of the Crescent Regiment's field officers were killed at Mansfield. (Bergeron, p. 146))
Mouton's Infantry Division; BG Alfred Mouton (k); BG Camille de Polignac	Gray's Brigade; Col Henry Gray	28th Louisiana Infantry Regiment: Ltc William Walker (k)
Mouton's Infantry Division; BG Alfred Mouton (k); BG Camille de Polignac	Artillery; Maj T. A. Faries (Note: Kiper's order of battle listed no artillery for Mouton's division. The 1st Regulars Battery was listed as unattached, and Cornay's and Boone's batteries were not listed at all. (Kiper, p. 181) Faries stated that he commanded the division's artillery and reported on all three batteries. (Official Records, pp. 630–632) Cornay's was "lightly engaged" at Mansfield, Boone's fought at the Battle of Mansura, and Barnes' and Cornay's fought at Mansura and the Battle of Yellow Bayou. Cornay was killed in a clash with gunboats at Cane River. (Bergeron, pp. 17–21))	1st Louisiana Regular Battery: Cpt James M. T. Barnes, 2 × 12-pdr Nap, 2 × 3.8" JR
Mouton's Infantry Division; BG Alfred Mouton (k); BG Camille de Polignac	Artillery; Maj T. A. Faries	Cornay's Battery: Cpt Florian O. Cornay (k), Lt John B. Tarleton, 2 × 12-pdr Nap, 2 × 12-pdr how
Mouton's Infantry Division; BG Alfred Mouton (k); BG Camille de Polignac	Artillery; Maj T. A. Faries	Boone's Battery: Lt Maunsel Bennett, 2 × 30-pdr PR

=== Cavalry ===
BG Thomas Green

Texas Cavalry Corps
Division	Brigade	Regiments and others
Bee's Cavalry Division; BG Hamilton P. Bee	Debray's Brigade: BG Xavier Debray	23rd Texas Cavalry Regiment: Col Nicholas C. Gould
Bee's Cavalry Division; BG Hamilton P. Bee	Debray's Brigade: BG Xavier Debray	26th Texas Cavalry Regiment: Ltc J. J. Meyers
Bee's Cavalry Division; BG Hamilton P. Bee	Debray's Brigade: BG Xavier Debray	36th Texas Cavalry Regiment: Col Peter C. Woods
Bee's Cavalry Division; BG Hamilton P. Bee	Buchel's Brigade; Col Augustus Buchel (k)	1st Texas Cavalry Regiment: Ltc William O. Yager
Bee's Cavalry Division; BG Hamilton P. Bee	Buchel's Brigade; Col Augustus Buchel (k)	35th (Likens') Texas Cavalry Regiment: Col James B. Likens (Note: Likens' Regiment arrived after Pleasant Hill and was engaged in the pursuit of Banks' army. (Kiper, p. 179))
Bee's Cavalry Division; BG Hamilton P. Bee	Buchel's Brigade; Col Augustus Buchel (k)	Terrell's Texas Cavalry Regiment: Col Alexander W. Terrell
Major's Cavalry Division; BG James Patrick Major	Lane's Brigade; Col Walter P. Lane (w); Col George W. Baylor	1st Texas Partisan Rangers: Ltc R. P. Crump
Major's Cavalry Division; BG James Patrick Major	Lane's Brigade; Col Walter P. Lane (w); Col George W. Baylor	2nd Texas Partisan Rangers: Col Isham Chisum
Major's Cavalry Division; BG James Patrick Major	Lane's Brigade; Col Walter P. Lane (w); Col George W. Baylor	2nd Texas Cavalry Regiment: Col George W. Baylor, Ltc John W. Mullen
Major's Cavalry Division; BG James Patrick Major	Lane's Brigade; Col Walter P. Lane (w); Col George W. Baylor	3rd Texas Cavalry Regiment: Ltc George T. Madison
Major's Cavalry Division; BG James Patrick Major	Bagby's Brigade; BG Arthur P. Bagby	4th Texas Cavalry Regiment: Col William Polk Hardeman
Major's Cavalry Division; BG James Patrick Major	Bagby's Brigade; BG Arthur P. Bagby	5th Texas Cavalry Regiment: Col Henry C. McNeill
Major's Cavalry Division; BG James Patrick Major	Bagby's Brigade; BG Arthur P. Bagby	7th Texas Cavalry Regiment: Ltc Philemon T. Herbert
Major's Cavalry Division; BG James Patrick Major	Bagby's Brigade; BG Arthur P. Bagby	13th Texas Cavalry Battalion: Ltc Edward Waller
Steele's Cavalry Division; BG William Steele (Note: Steele's Division arrived after Pleasant Hill and was engaged in the pursuit of Banks' army. (Kiper, p. 179))	Parson's Brigade; Col William H. Parsons (Note: This brigade's commander alternated between Parsons and George W. Carter.)	12th Texas Cavalry Regiment: Col William H. Parsons
Steele's Cavalry Division; BG William Steele	Parson's Brigade; Col William H. Parsons	19th Texas Cavalry Regiment: Col Nathaniel M. Burford
Steele's Cavalry Division; BG William Steele	Parson's Brigade; Col William H. Parsons	21st Texas Cavalry Regiment: Col George W. Carter
Steele's Cavalry Division; BG William Steele	Parson's Brigade; Col William H. Parsons	Morgan's Texas Cavalry Battalion: Ltc Charles L. Morgan
Steele's Cavalry Division; BG William Steele	Parson's Brigade; Col William H. Parsons	10th Texas Field Battery: Cpt J. H. Pratt
Corps Artillery	Artillery; Maj Oliver J. Semmes	Moseley's Texas Battery: Cpt Willam G. Moseley
Corps Artillery	Artillery; Maj Oliver J. Semmes	Val Verde Texas Battery: Cpt T. D. Nettles, 2 × 6-pdr gun, 2 × 12-pdr how
Corps Artillery	Artillery; Maj Oliver J. Semmes	McMahan's Texas Battery: Cpt M. V. McMahan
Corps Artillery	Artillery; Maj Oliver J. Semmes	West's Louisiana Battery: Cpt John A. A. West, 2 × 10-pdr PR, 2 × 12-pdr how
Unattached Cavalry	Unbrigaded Cavalry	2nd Louisiana Cavalry Regiment: Col William G. Vincent

== Attachments ==
BG Thomas J. Churchill

Churchill's corps
Division	Brigade	Regiments and others
Arkansas Infantry Division; BG James C. Tappan	Tappan's Brigade; Col H. L. Grinstead	19th and 24th Arkansas Infantry Regiment: Ltc William R. Hardy
Arkansas Infantry Division; BG James C. Tappan	Tappan's Brigade; Col H. L. Grinstead	27th and 38th Arkansas Infantry Regiment: Col Robert G. Shaver
Arkansas Infantry Division; BG James C. Tappan	Tappan's Brigade; Col H. L. Grinstead	33rd Arkansas Infantry Regiment: Ltc Thomas D. Thomson
Arkansas Infantry Division; BG James C. Tappan	Gause's Brigade; Col Lucien C. Gause	26th Arkansas Infantry Regiment: Ltc Iverson L. Brooks
Arkansas Infantry Division; BG James C. Tappan	Gause's Brigade; Col Lucien C. Gause	32nd Arkansas Infantry Regiment: Ltc William Hicks
Arkansas Infantry Division; BG James C. Tappan	Gause's Brigade; Col Lucien C. Gause	36th Arkansas Infantry Regiment: Col James M. Davie
Arkansas Infantry Division; BG James C. Tappan	Hawthorn's Brigade; BG Alexander T. Hawthorn	34th Arkansas Infantry: -
Arkansas Infantry Division; BG James C. Tappan	Hawthorn's Brigade; BG Alexander T. Hawthorn	35th Arkansas Infantry: -
Arkansas Infantry Division; BG James C. Tappan	Hawthorn's Brigade; BG Alexander T. Hawthorn	37th Arkansas Infantry: -
Arkansas Infantry Division; BG James C. Tappan	Hawthorn's Brigade; BG Alexander T. Hawthorn	Cocke's Arkansas Infantry: Col John B. Cocke
Arkansas Infantry Division; BG James C. Tappan	Artillery	6th Arkansas Field Battery: Cpt Chambers B. Etter
Missouri Infantry Division; BG Mosby M. Parsons	1st Brigade; BG John B. Clark	8th Missouri Infantry Regiment: Col Charles S. Mitchell
Missouri Infantry Division; BG Mosby M. Parsons	1st Brigade; BG John B. Clark	9th Missouri Infantry Regiment: Col Richard H. Musser
Missouri Infantry Division; BG Mosby M. Parsons	1st Brigade; BG John B. Clark	1st Missouri Field Battery: Cpt Samuel T. Ruffner
Missouri Infantry Division; BG Mosby M. Parsons	2nd Brigade; Col Simon P. Burns	10th Missouri Infantry Regiment: Col William M. Moore
Missouri Infantry Division; BG Mosby M. Parsons	2nd Brigade; Col Simon P. Burns	11th Missouri Infantry Regiment: Ltc Thomas H. Murray
Missouri Infantry Division; BG Mosby M. Parsons	2nd Brigade; Col Simon P. Burns	12th Missouri Infantry Regiment: Col Willis M. Ponder
Missouri Infantry Division; BG Mosby M. Parsons	2nd Brigade; Col Simon P. Burns	16th Missouri Infantry Regiment: Ltc P. W. H. Cumming
Missouri Infantry Division; BG Mosby M. Parsons	2nd Brigade; Col Simon P. Burns	9th Missouri Sharpshooter Battalion: Maj L. A. Pindall
Missouri Infantry Division; BG Mosby M. Parsons	2nd Brigade; Col Simon P. Burns	Lesueur's Missouri Battery: Cpt A. A. Lesueur
