= 7th Texas Cavalry Regiment =

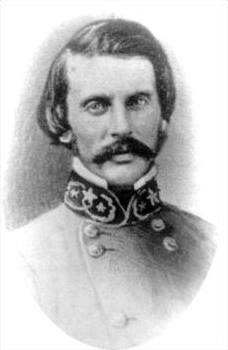
- William Steele became the regiment's first colonel; he was later promoted to brigadier general.
- Active: August 1861 – June 1865
- Country: Confederate States of America
- Allegiance: Confederate States of America, Texas
- Branch: Confederate States Army
- Type: Cavalry
- Size: Regiment
- Engagements: American Civil War; Battle of Valverde (1862); Battle of Glorieta Pass (1862); Battle of Albuquerque (1862); Battle of Peralta (1862); Battle of Galveston (1863); 2nd Battle of Donaldsonville (1863); Battle of Kock's Plantation (1863); Battle of Bayou Bourbeux (1863); Battle of Mansfield (1864); Battle of Pleasant Hill (1864)

Commanders
- Notable commanders: William Steele; Philemon T. Herbert

The 7th Texas Cavalry Regiment was a unit of mounted volunteers from Texas that fought in the Confederate States Army during the American Civil War. In the summer of 1861, the regiment was organized and mustered into Confederate service. In November 1861, it was assigned to a brigade that was tasked with capturing New Mexico Territory. In 1862, the regiment served in the unsuccessful New Mexico Campaign. In 1863, it was in action at Galveston, Second Donaldsonville, Kock's Plantation, and Bayou Bourbeux. In 1864, the regiment fought at Mansfield and Pleasant Hill in the Red River Campaign. The unit disbanded while in Texas in May 1865.

== See also ==
- List of Texas Civil War Confederate units
