= Second Battle of Donaldsonville =

American Civil War battle

Coordinates: 30°06′30″N 90°59′29″W

- Part of the American Civil War
Date	June 28, 1863
Location	Ascension Parish, Louisiana
Result	Union victory

Belligerents
United States (Union)	(Confederate States of America) CSA (Confederacy)

Commanders and leaders
Joseph D. Bullen	Tom Green

Units involved
28th Maine; USS Winona (1861); USS Princess Royal	Tom Green's Texas Brigade; James Patrick Major's Texas Brigade

Strength
2 companies 2 gunboats	2 brigades

Casualties and losses
23	301

The Second Battle of Donaldsonville was an American Civil War battle took place on June 28, 1863 in Ascension Parish, Louisiana.

== Background ==
On June 28, 1863, Confederate Brig. Gen. Jean Alfred Mouton ordered Brig. Gen. Tom Green's and Col. James Patrick Major's brigades to take Donaldsonville, Louisiana. The Union had built Fort Butler, which the Rebels had to take before occupying the town.

== Forces engaged ==
The Union forces were the Fort Butler Garrison: two companies of the 28th Maine Volunteer Infantry and some convalescents from various regiments. The Confederate forces were Tom Green's Texas Brigade and Colonel James Patrick Major's Texas Brigade.

== Battle ==
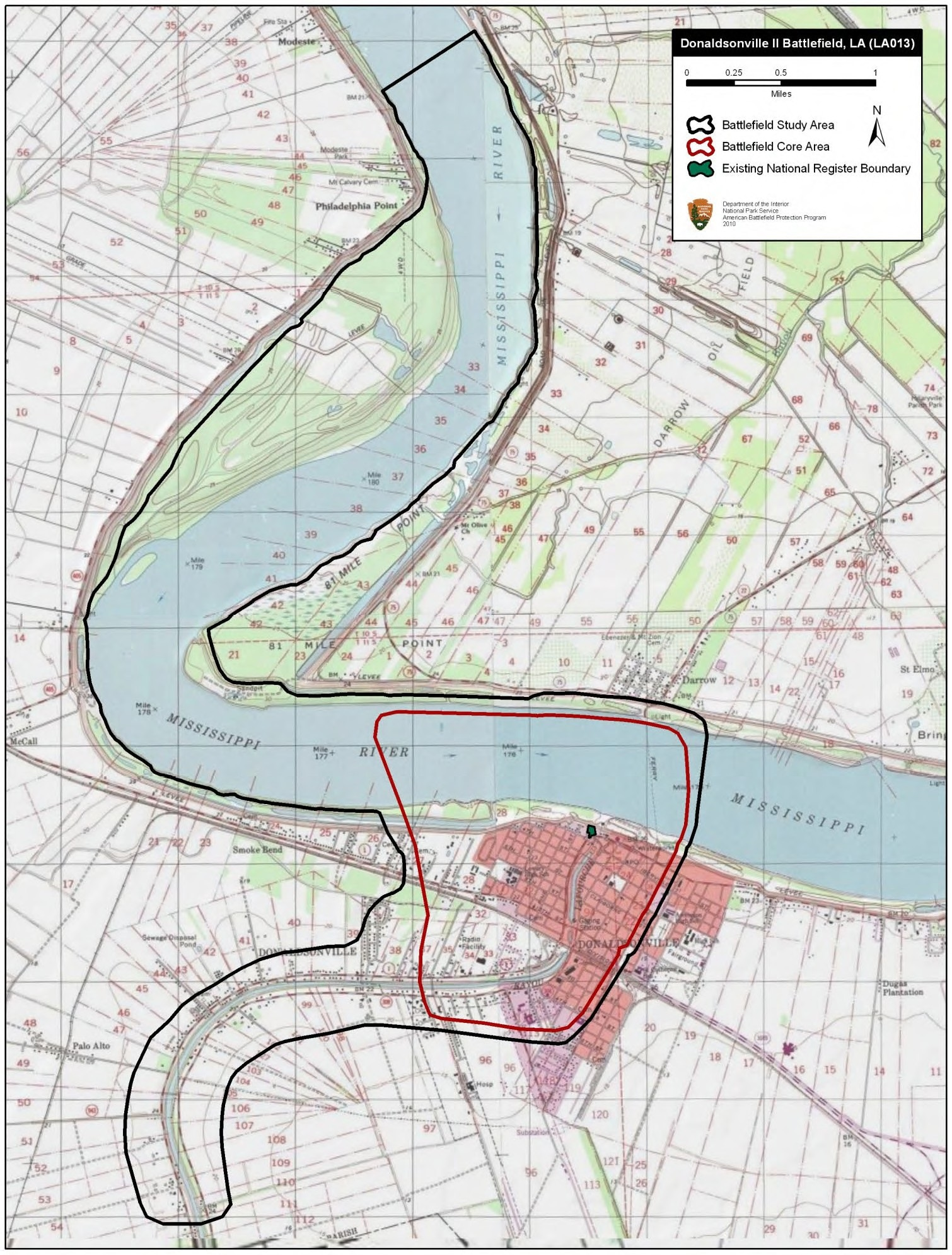
Map of Donaldsonville II Battlefield core and study areas by the American Battlefield Protection Program.

On the night of June 27, Green, within a mile and a half of the fort, began moving troops ahead to attack. The attack started soon after midnight, and the Confederates quickly surrounded the fort and began passing through the various obstructions. Those troops attacking along the levee came to a ditch, unknown to them, too wide to cross, that saved the day for the Union garrison. A Union gunboat, USS Princess Royal, came to the garrison's aid also and began shelling the attackers. Futile Confederate assaults continued for some time but they eventually ceased their operations and retired.

== Result ==
This point on the Mississippi River remained in Union hands and many other Mississippi River towns were occupied by the Yankees: the Confederates could harass but not eliminate these Union enclaves.

== Opposing Forces ==
=== Union ===
- 28th Maine Volunteer Infantry Regiment
  - Company C
  - Company F
  - Company G
- Misc. Convalescents and Freedmen
- USS Princess Royal - Cmdr Melancthon Brooks Woolsey
- USS Winona (1861) - Lt. Cmdr. A.W. Weaver

=== Confederate ===
- 3rd Texas Cavalry Regiment (Arizona Brigade)
- 3rd Texas Cavalry Regiment - Col Joseph Phillips
- 4th Texas Cavalry Regiment - Col W. P. Hardeman
- 5th Texas Cavalry Regiment - Maj. Denman Shannon
- 7th Texas Cavalry Regiment - Col. Philemon T. Herbert
- 1st Texas Partisan Rangers - Col. Walter P. Lane
- 2nd Texas Partisan Rangers - Lt. Col R. P. Crump
- 1st Louisiana Regular Battery - Lt. O. Semmes
