= 1st Texas Partisan Rangers =

- Active: 1862–1865
- Disbanded: May 26, 1865
- Country: Confederate States
- Allegiance: Texas
- Branch: Army
- Type: Cavalry
- Size: Regiment
- Engagements: American Civil War; Battle of Prairie Grove; Battle of Van Buren; Second Battle of Donaldsonville; Battle of Kock's Plantation; Battle of Stirling's Plantation; Battle of Bayou Bourbeux; Battle of Mansfield; Battle of Pleasant Hill; Battle of Monett's Ferry; Battle of Yellow Bayou

Commanders
- Notable commanders: Walter P. Lane

The 1st Texas Partisan Rangers was a unit of mounted volunteers from Texas that fought in the Confederate States Army during the American Civil War.

== History ==
Walter P. Lane began organizing the unit at Jefferson, Texas, in June 1862 for service in the Trans-Mississippi theater. In November 1862, the regiment marched to Arkansas where it fought at Prairie Grove and Van Buren. After reorganizing at Jefferson, the partisan rangers traveled to Louisiana in April 1863. The regiment was at Second Donaldsonville but did not come into action. In 1863, it fought at Kock's Plantation, Sterling's Plantation, and Bayou Bourbeux. The unit spent the 1863–1864 winter near Galveston. In 1864, the unit was in action during the Red River Campaign, fighting at Mansfield, Pleasant Hill, Monett's Ferry, and Yellow Bayou. The partisan rangers went back to Texas in December 1864 and remained near Houston until the surrender of the Trans-Mississippi Department on 26 May 1865.

== See also ==
- List of Texas Civil War Confederate units
- Texas in the Civil War
