= 4th Texas Cavalry Regiment =

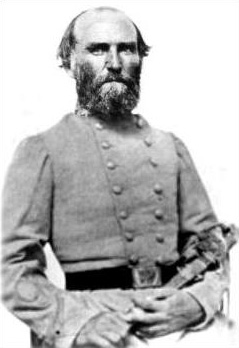
- William R. Scurry became the regiment's second colonel and was later promoted to brigadier general.
- Active: August 1861 – June 1865
- Country: Confederate States of America
- Allegiance: Confederate States of America, Texas
- Branch: Confederate States Army
- Type: Cavalry
- Size: Regiment (810 men, Oct. 1861)
- Engagements: American Civil War; Battle of Valverde (1862); Battle of Glorieta Pass (1862); Battle of Albuquerque (1862); Battle of Peralta (1862); Battle of Galveston (1863); Battle of Fort Bisland (1863); Battle of Irish Bend (1863); 2nd Battle of Donaldsonville (1863); Battle of Kock's Plantation (1863); Battle of Stirling's Plantation (1863); Battle of Bayou Bourbeux (1863); Battle of Mansfield (1864); Battle of Pleasant Hill (1864)

Commanders
- Notable commanders: William Read Scurry

The 4th Texas Cavalry Regiment was a unit of mounted volunteers from Texas that fought in the Confederate States Army during the American Civil War. The unit was organized in September 1861 with the aim of seizing New Mexico Territory. In 1862, the regiment served in the unsuccessful New Mexico Campaign. In 1863, it was in action at Galveston, Fort Bisland, Irish Bend, Second Donaldsonville, Kock's Plantation, Sterling's Plantation, and Bayou Bourbeux. In 1864, the regiment fought at Mansfield and Pleasant Hill in the Red River Campaign. The unit surrendered in May 1865.

== See also ==
- List of Texas Civil War Confederate units
