= 2nd Texas Partisan Rangers =

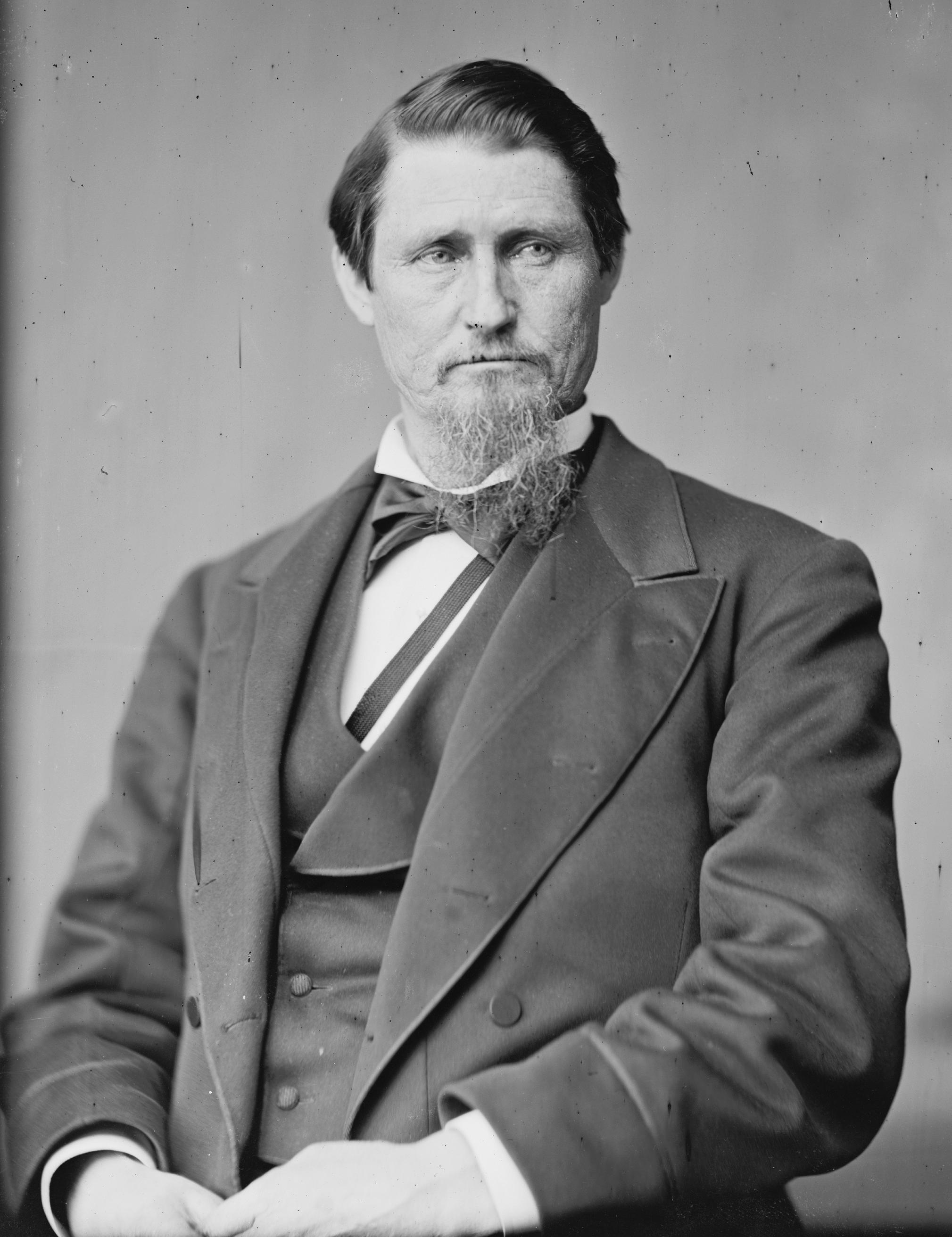
- James Throckmorton was a major in the regiment and later became governor of Texas.
- Active: October 1862 – 26 May 1865
- Country: Confederate States of America
- Allegiance: Confederate States of America, Texas
- Branch: Confederate States Army
- Type: Cavalry
- Size: Regiment
- Engagements: American Civil War; 2nd Battle of Donaldsonville (1863); Battle of Kock's Plantation (1863); Battle of Stirling's Plantation (1863); Battle of Bayou Bourbeux (1863); Battle of Mansfield (1864); Battle of Pleasant Hill (1864); Battle of Monett's Ferry (1864); Battle of Yellow Bayou (1864)

Commanders
- Notable commanders: B. Warren Stone; Isham Chisum

The 2nd Texas Partisan Rangers was a unit of mounted volunteers from Texas that fought in the Confederate States Army during the American Civil War. B. Warren Stone began organizing the unit at Dallas in October 1862 with the permission of Confederate States Secretary of War George W. Randolph. In March 1863, the regiment marched to Houston and the following month it traveled to Louisiana as part of James Patrick Major's brigade. Soon after, Stone was replaced as colonel by Isham Chisum. The regiment fought at Second Donaldsonville, Kock's Plantation, Sterling's Plantation, and Bayou Bourbeux. In 1863–1864, the unit wintered near Galveston. In 1864, the 2nd Partisan Rangers were in action at Mansfield, Pleasant Hill, Monett's Ferry, and Yellow Bayou during the Red River Campaign. The partisan rangers went back to Texas in December 1864 and usually camped at Houston until the surrender of the Trans-Mississippi Department on 26 May 1865.

== See also ==
- List of Texas Civil War Confederate units
- Texas in the Civil War
