= 3rd Texas Cavalry Regiment (Arizona Brigade) =

- Active: 29 May 1862 – 26 May 1865
- Country: Confederate States of America
- Allegiance: Confederate States of America, Texas
- Branch: Confederate States Army
- Type: Cavalry
- Size: Regiment
- Engagements: American Civil War; 2nd Battle of Donaldsonville (1863); Battle of Stirling's Plantation (1863); Battle of Bayou Bourbeux (1863); Battle of Mansfield (1864); Battle of Pleasant Hill (1864); Battle of Monett's Ferry (1864); Battle of Yellow Bayou (1864)

Commanders
- Notable commanders: Joseph Phillips; George T. Madison

The 3rd Texas Cavalry Regiment (Arizona Brigade) was a unit of mounted volunteers from Texas that fought in the Confederate States Army during the American Civil War. In May 1862, John R. Baylor received authority to organize five battalions of Partisan Rangers of six companies each. The purpose of the so-called Arizona Brigade was to reconquer the southwestern territories lost during the New Mexico campaign. One of the battalions was commanded by George T. Madison, the former deputy sheriff of Tucson, Arizona. After Baylor was dismissed from command, Madison's battalion merged with several additional companies to form a regiment and John Phillips was appointed colonel. In April 1863, the new regiment marched to Louisiana where it fought at the Second Battle of Donaldsonville in June. Phillips was killed and Madison led the regiment in action at Sterling's Plantation and Bayou Bourbeux in 1863, and at Mansfield, Pleasant Hill, Monett's Ferry, and Yellow Bayou in 1864. After marching to Arkansas in September 1864, the regiment returned to Texas near Houston in December. The unit disbanded after the surrender of the Trans-Mississippi Department on 26 May 1865.

== See also ==
- List of Texas Civil War Confederate units
- Texas in the Civil War
