= 2nd Texas Cavalry Regiment (Arizona Brigade) =

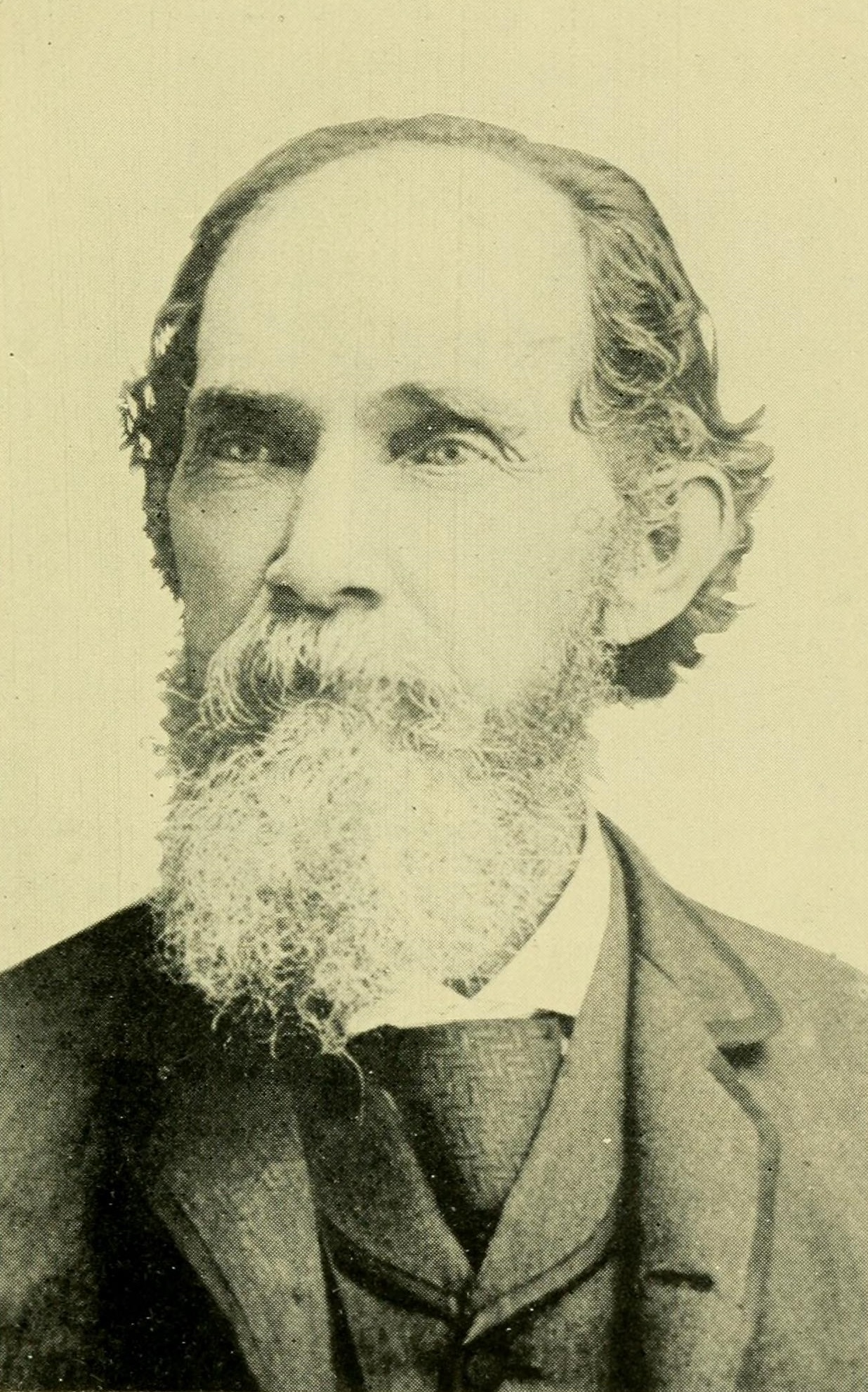
- George W. Baylor was the regiment's original colonel.
- Active: 29 May 1862 – 26 May 1865
- Country: Confederate States of America
- Allegiance: Confederate States of America, Texas
- Branch: Confederate States Army
- Type: Cavalry
- Size: Regiment
- Engagements: American Civil War; Battle of Brashear City (1863); Battle of Stirling's Plantation (1863); Battle of Bayou Bourbeux (1863); Battle of Mansfield (1864); Battle of Pleasant Hill (1864); Battle of Monett's Ferry (1864); Battle of Yellow Bayou (1864)

Commanders
- Notable commanders: George Wythe Baylor

The 2nd Texas Cavalry Regiment (Arizona Brigade) was a unit of mounted volunteers from Texas that fought in the Confederate States Army during the American Civil War. In May 1862, the Confederate States Army authorized John R. Baylor to organize five battalions of Partisan Rangers of six companies each. Their purpose was to recapture the southwestern territories lost during the New Mexico campaign, hence the name Arizona Brigade. One of the battalions was commanded by George Wythe Baylor, John Baylor's younger brother. Later, George Baylor's battalion was combined with a small battalion led by John W. Mullen and an additional company to form a regiment. In April 1863, the new regiment left Texas under George Baylor's command and marched to Louisiana. The regiment fought at Brashear City, Sterling's Plantation, and Bayou Bourbeux before wintering near Galveston in 1863–1864. The regiment was in action during the 1864 Red River Campaign, fighting at Mansfield, Pleasant Hill, Monett's Ferry, and Yellow Bayou. After campaigning in Arkansas in September 1864, the regiment returned to Texas near Houston in December. The regiment received orders to dismount which were resented by the soldiers. After an argument about the orders, Baylor shot and killed his superior officer John A. Wharton. The unit disbanded after the surrender of the Trans-Mississippi Department on 26 May 1865.

== See also ==
- List of Texas Civil War Confederate units
- Texas in the Civil War
