= 5th Texas Cavalry Regiment =

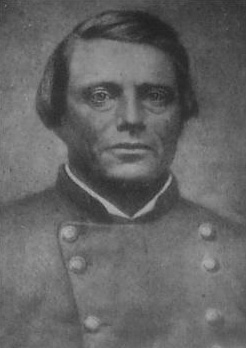
- Tom Green was the regiment's first colonel.
- Active: August 1861 – June 1865
- Country: Confederate States of America
- Allegiance: Confederate States of America, Texas
- Branch: Confederate States Army
- Type: Cavalry
- Size: Regiment
- Nickname: 5th Texas Mounted Rifles
- Engagements: American Civil War; Battle of Valverde (1862); Battle of Glorieta Pass (1862); Battle of Albuquerque (1862); Battle of Peralta (1862); Battle of Galveston (1863); Battle of Fort Bisland (1863); Battle of Irish Bend (1863); 2nd Battle of Donaldsonville (1863); Battle of Stirling's Plantation (1863); Battle of Mansfield (1864); Battle of Pleasant Hill (1864); Battle of Blair's Landing (1864)

Commanders
- Notable commanders: Col. Tom Green

The 5th Texas Cavalry Regiment or 5th Texas Mounted Rifles was a unit of mounted volunteers from Texas that fought in the Confederate States Army during the American Civil War. The unit was organized at San Antonio in August 1861 for the purpose of invading New Mexico Territory. In 1862, the unit participated in the ultimately unsuccessful New Mexico Campaign. In 1863, the regiment fought at Galveston, Fort Bisland, Irish Bend, Second Donaldsonville, and Sterling's Plantation. In 1864, the unit was in action during the Red River Campaign. After being withdrawn to Texas, the regiment disbanded by June 1865.

== See also ==
- List of Texas Civil War Confederate units
