= George T. Madison =

American military officer

- Born: c. 1830
- Died: 1868
- Military career
- Allegiance: United States; Confederate States
- Branch: United States Army; Confederate States Army
- Rank: Colonel
- Battles: American Civil War; Battle of Monett's Ferry

George T. Madison (c. 1830–1868), of either New York or Missouri, did service in the United States Army during the Mexican–American War, and was a cavalry officer in the Confederate States Army during the American Civil War. He was the deputy sheriff of Tucson, Arizona.

== See also ==
- 3rd Texas Cavalry Regiment (Arizona Brigade)
- Joseph Phillips (officer)

== Sources ==
- Park, David; Allardice, Bruce (July 15, 2011). "Madison, George T. (ca. 1830–1868)". Handbook of Texas (online ed.). Texas State Historical Association. Retrieved April 23, 2023.
