= St. Emma Plantation =

Historic house in Louisiana, United States

- St. Emma
- U.S. National Register of Historic Places
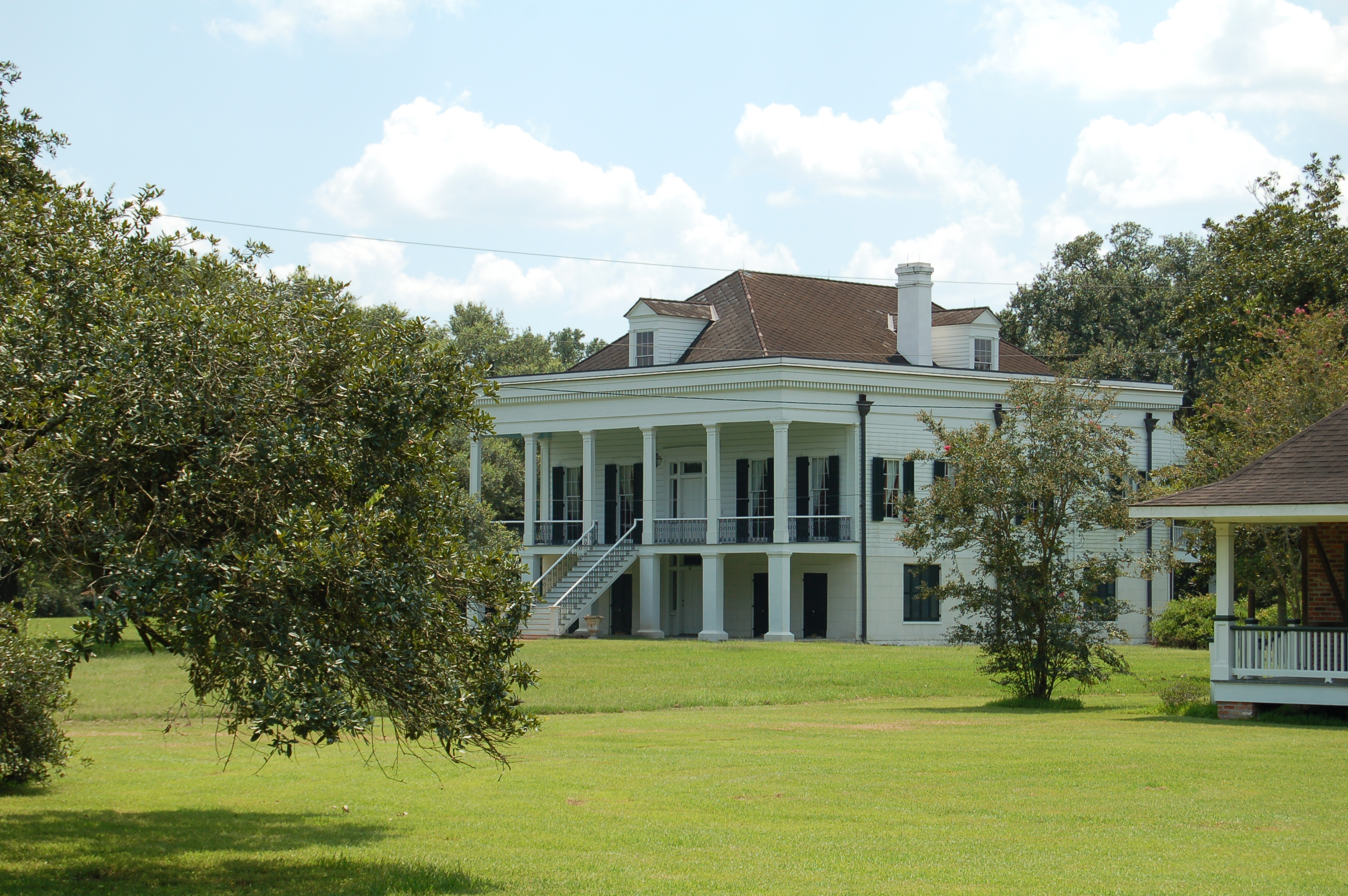

- Location within Louisiana Location within the United States
- Location: Along Louisiana Highway 1, about 300 yards (270 m) south of intersection with Louisiana Highway 943
- Nearest city: Donaldsonville, Louisiana
- Coordinates: 30°05′03″N 91°01′50″W
- Area: 5 acres (2.0 ha)
- Built: c. 1850
- Architectural style: Greek Revival
- NRHP reference No.: 80001695
- Added to NRHP: June 30, 1980

St. Emma Plantation is a 13,000-acre (5,300 ha) former sugar plantation and house in Ascension Parish, Louisiana, United States.

The plantation was the scene of a Civil War skirmish Battle of Kock's Plantation in the summer of 18632. The Greek Revival plantation house was owned by Charles A. Kock, a prominent sugar planter and slaveholder, between 1854 and 1869.

The house was listed on National Register of Historic Places in 1980.

== See also ==
- National Register of Historic Places listings in Ascension Parish, Louisiana
