= Peter Cavanaugh Woods =

Confederate military officer (1819–1898)

Peter C. Woods
- Born: December 30, 1819; Franklin County, Tennessee, US
- Died: January 27, 1898 (aged 78); San Marcos, Texas, US
- Military career
- Allegiance: Confederate States
- Branch: Confederate States Army
- Rank: Colonel
- Commands: 36th Texas Cavalry Regiment
- Battles: American Civil War; Battle of Mansfield; Battle of Pleasant Hill; Battle of Blair's Landing; Battle of Monett's Ferry; Battle of Yellow Bayou (WIA)

Peter Cavanaugh Woods (1819–1898) was a Confederate cavalry officer.

== Sources ==
- Cutrer, Thomas W. (September 1, 1995). "Woods, Peter Cavanaugh (1819–1898)". Handbook of Texas (online ed.). Texas State Historical Association.
