= Val Verde Texas Battery =

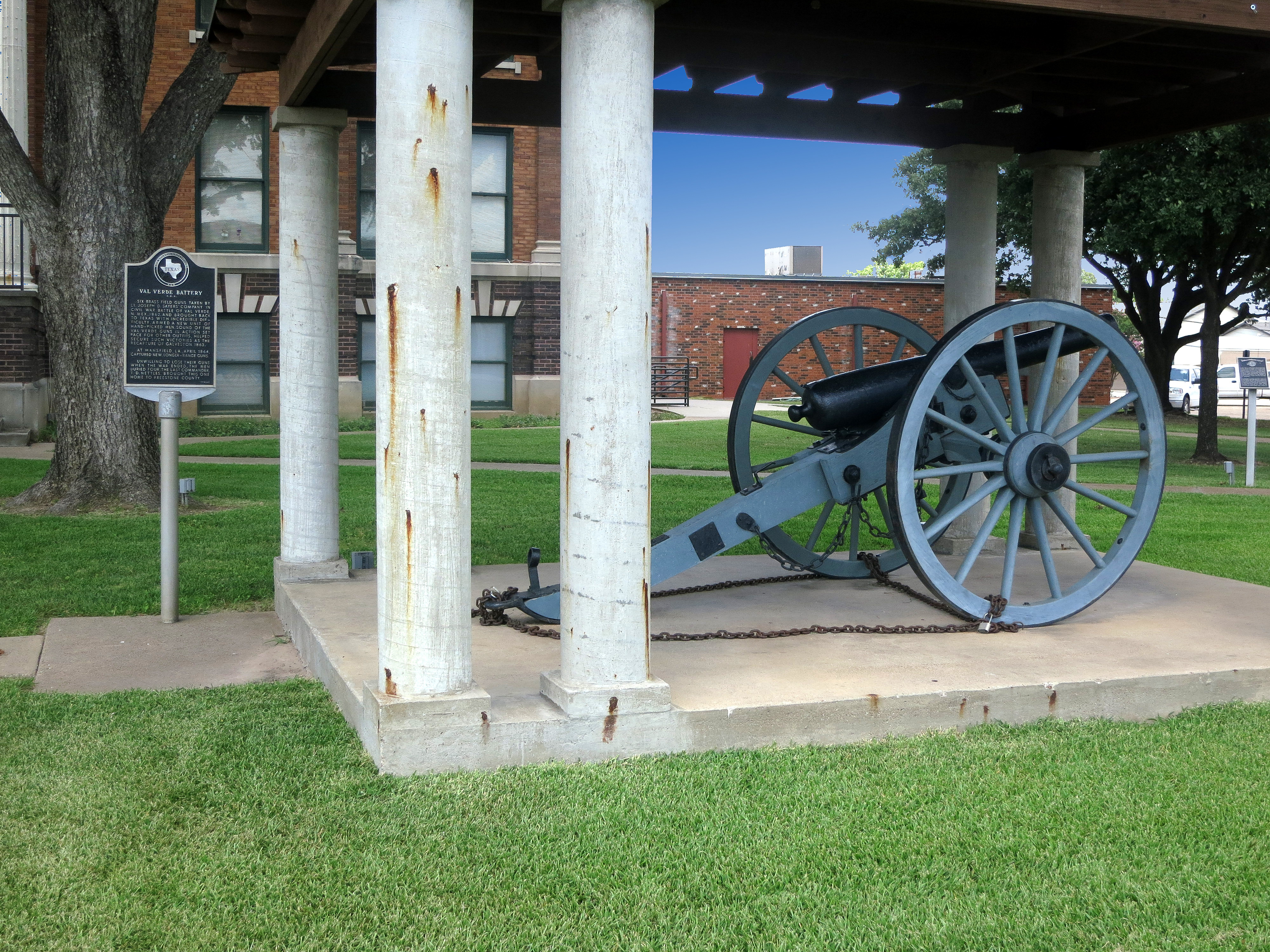
- 3-inch Ordnance rifle used by the Val Verde Battery after its capture in April 1864. It is located at the Freestone County, Texas, courthouse.
- Active: 21 February 1862 – 26 May 1865
- Country: Confederate States of America
- Allegiance: Confederate States of America, Texas
- Branch: Confederate States Army
- Type: Field Artillery
- Size: Artillery Battery
- Equipment: 3 x M1841 6-pounder field guns, 2 x M1841 12-pdr howitzer (Feb. 1862); 2 x M1841 6-pounder field guns, 2 x 3-inch Ordnance rifles (May 1864)
- Engagements: American Civil War; Battle of Peralta (1862); Capture of USS Diana (1863); Battle of Fort Bisland (1863); Battle of Vermilion Bayou (1863); Battle of Mansfield (1864); Battle of Pleasant Hill (1864); Battle of Monett's Ferry (1864)

Commanders
- Notable commanders: Joseph D. Sayers

The Val Verde Battery was an artillery battery from Texas that served in the Confederate States Army during the American Civil War. At the Battle of Valverde on 21 February 1862, the Confederates captured five artillery pieces from Union forces. The Confederates formed an ad hoc battery which fought at Peralta. The artillery battery officially formed on 1 June 1862 at Fort Bliss. It later transferred to Louisiana where it helped capture the USS Diana and fought at Fort Bisland and Vermilion Bayou in 1863. The following year, the battery served at Mansfield and Pleasant Hill. After two old howitzers were replaced by two new captured guns, the unit fought at Monett's Ferry. At the end of the war in spring 1865, the soldiers buried their cannons. When the guns were dug up a few years later, the two new guns were the only ones that could be saved, and they have survived to this day.

== See also ==
- List of Texas Civil War Confederate units
