= Sabine Rebels =

"The Sabine Rebels"
- Active: September 1861-July 1863 (some unofficial action later)
- Country: Confederate States of America
- Branch: Confederate Army
- Size: ~103 men, including officers
- Part of: 17th Louisiana Infantry Regiment
- Engagements: American Civil War: Battle of Shiloh; Battle of Port Gibson; Battle of Chickasaw Bayou; Siege of Vicksburg; Battle of Pleasant Hill (unofficially)

Commanders
- Notable commanders: Colonel S.S. Heard, CSA; Major David Washington Self, CSA

The successors to an earlier muster of men from Sabine and Union parishes (the Sabine and Union Rifles), the Sabine Rebels were formed in September 1861 and attached to the 17th Louisiana Infantry Regiment, taking part in actions at Shiloh, Port Gibson, and Chickasaw Bayou until the whole 17th Louisiana was captured and put on parole upon the conclusion of the Siege of Vicksburg.

After being paroled, many members of the Sabine Rebels returned to their homes in Sabine Parish and would later break their parole in order to fight at the battles of Mansfield and Pleasant Hill, where the Union Army was routed and prevented from accomplishing its goal of marching on Shreveport, the interim capital of the government of Louisiana.

Many officers holding rank within the Sabine Rebels would go on to take part in rebuilding their parish and its government after (and even during) the period of Congressional Reconstruction.

The design of the flag of the Sabine Rebels is presently unknown, as the last known person to possess a copy of the flag was a "Miss McNeely," the niece of Lieutenant Nash who served in the Sabine Rebels.
