= William Marland (Medal of Honor) =

American Civil War Medal of Honor recipient

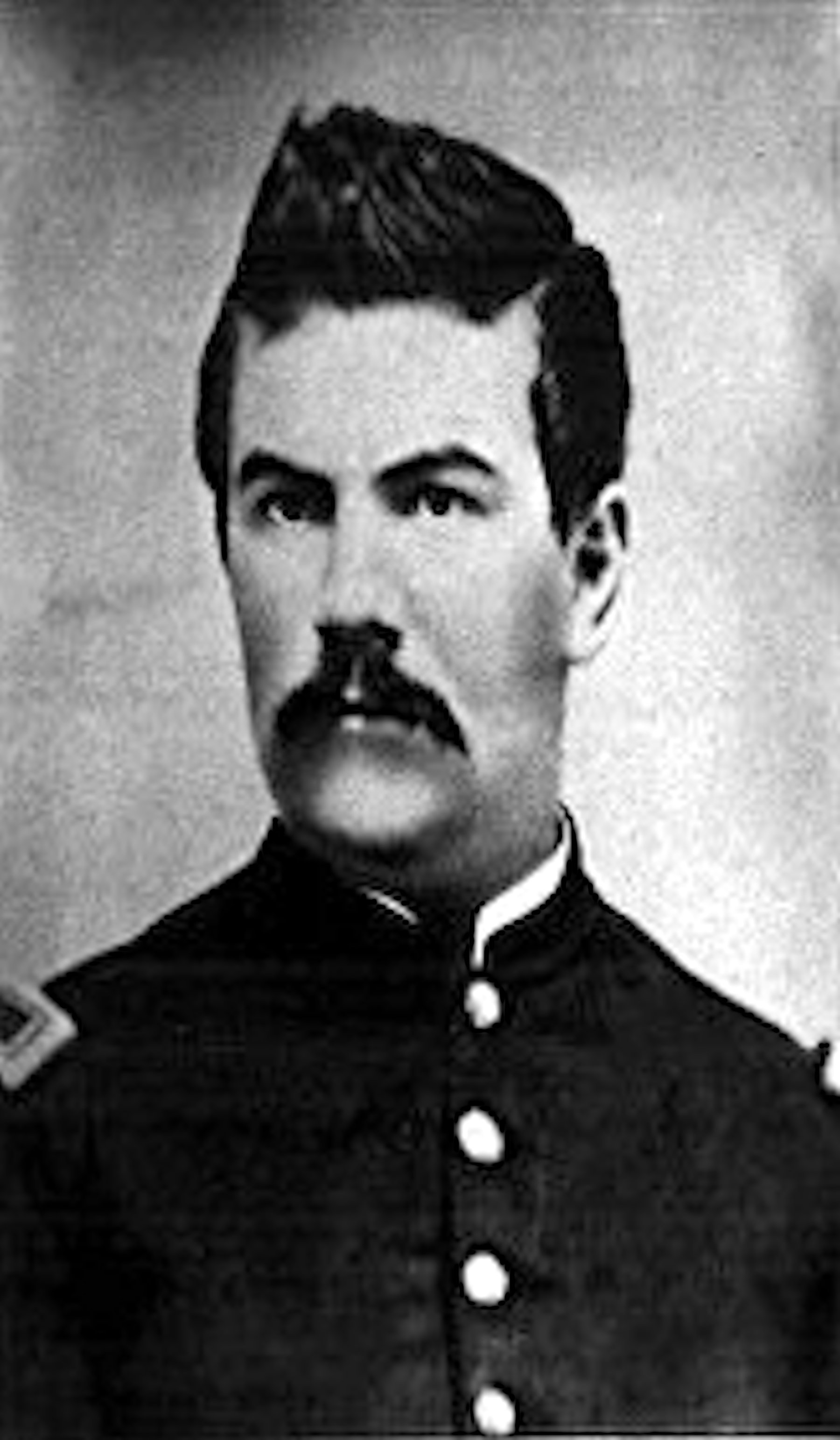
- Marland in 1865
- Born: March 11, 1839; Andover, Massachusetts
- Died: April 17, 1905 (aged 66)
- Military career
- Allegiance: United States of America
- Branch: United States Army
- Service years: 1861–1865
- Rank: Major
- Unit: 2nd Battery, Massachusetts Volunteer Light Artillery
- Conflicts: American Civil War
- Awards: Medal of Honor

William Marland (March 11, 1839 – April 17, 1905) was an officer in the United States Army and a Medal of Honor recipient for his role in the American Civil War.

He was a companion of the Massachusetts Commandery of the Military Order of the Loyal Legion of the United States.

== Medal of Honor citation ==
Rank and organization: First Lieutenant, 2d Independent Battery, Massachusetts Light Artillery. Place and date: At Grand Coteau, La., November 3, 1863. Entered service at:------. Born: March 11, 1839, Andover, Mass. Date of issue: February 16, 1897.

Citation:

After having been surrounded by the enemy's cavalry, his support having surrendered, he ordered a charge and saved the section of the battery that was under his command.

== See also ==
- List of American Civil War Medal of Honor recipients: M–P
