= 6th Louisiana Field Battery =

- Active: December 1862 – 1 June 1865
- Country: Confederate States of America
- Allegiance: Confederate States of America; Louisiana
- Branch: Confederate States Army
- Type: Artillery
- Size: Company
- Nickname: Grosse Tete Flying Artillery
- Equipment: 2 x M1841 12-pounder howitzers 2 x 10-pounder Parrott rifles
- Engagements: American Civil War; Battle of Mansfield (1864); Battle of Pleasant Hill (1864); Battle of Blair's Landing (1864); Battle of Monett's Ferry (1864); Capture of City Belle (1864); Destruction of USS Covington and USS Signal (1864); Battle of Mansura (1864); Battle of Yellow Bayou (1864)

Commanders
- Notable commanders: John A. A. West; John Yoist

The 6th Louisiana Field Battery was an artillery unit recruited from volunteers in Louisiana that fought in the Confederate States Army during the American Civil War. The Grosse Tete Artillery organized in December 1863 using men detached from the 1st Louisiana Regular Battery and exchanged prisoners from the Pointe Coupee Artillery. In April and May 1864, the battery served during the Red River campaign and fought at Mansfield, Pleasant Hill, Blair's Landing, and Monett's Ferry. In May 1864, the unit helped capture the Union river transport City Belle at Wilson's Landing, helped destroy the USS Covington and USS Signal, and fought at Mansura and Yellow Bayou. The battery surrendered on 1 June 1865 while at Alexandria, Louisiana.

== See also ==
- List of Louisiana Confederate Civil War units
- Louisiana in the Civil War
