= USS Princess Royal =

Gunboat of the United States Navy

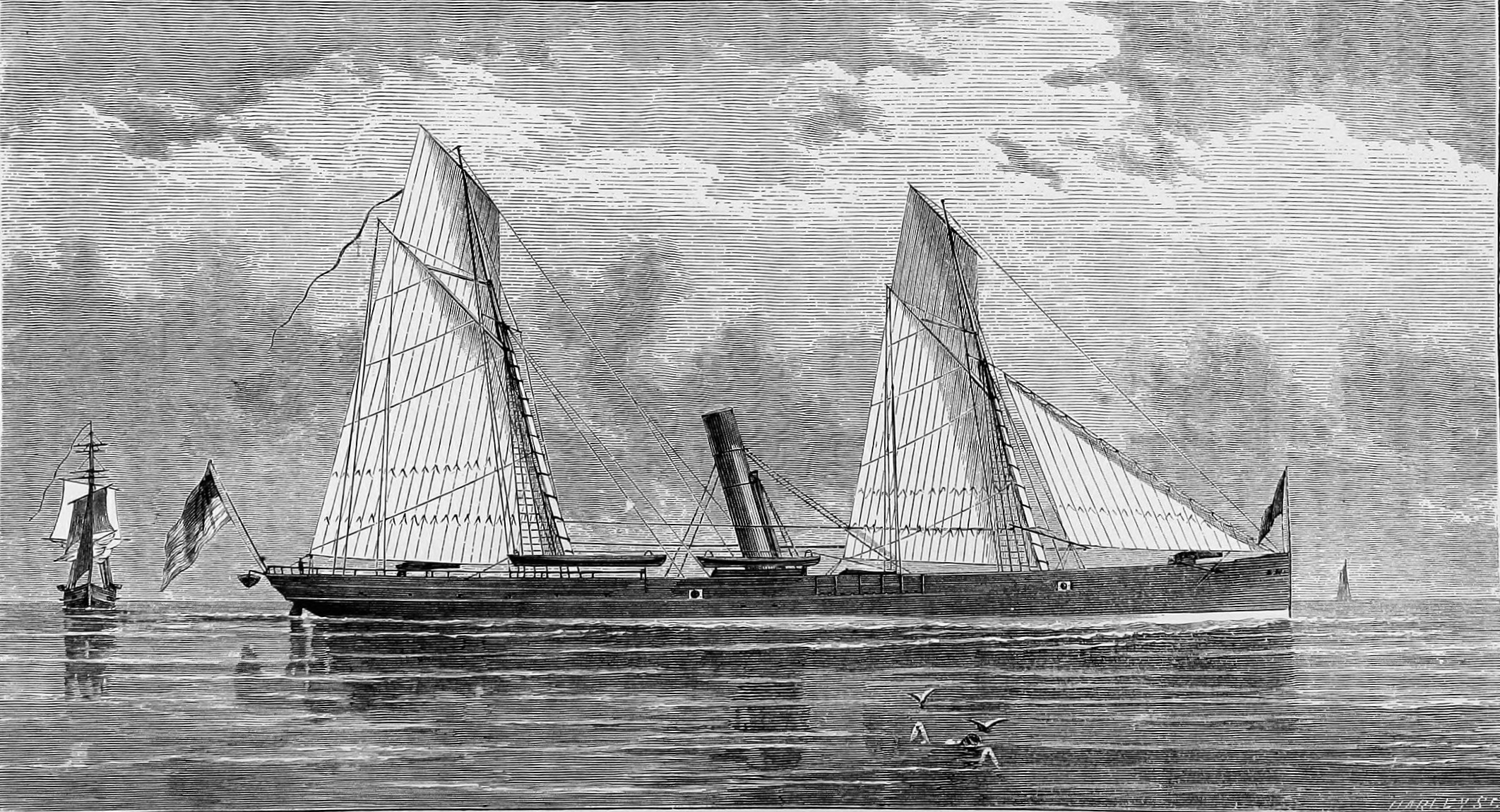
- USS Princess Royal

History

United Kingdom
- Name: Princess Royal
- Owner: 1861–1862: M Langlands & Sons, Glasgow; 1862–1863: J Roth & T Oxley, London
- Builder: Tod & McGregor, Glasgow, Scotland
- Yard number: 111
- Launched: 20 June 1861
- In service: 25 July 1861
- Captured: by Union Navy forces on 29 January 1863

United States
- Name: 1863–1865: Princess Royal; 1865–1874: Sherman
- Owner: 1863–1865: United States Navy; 1865–1874: William F Weld & Co, Boston,
- Acquired: 18 March 1863
- Decommissioned: c21 July 1865
- Fate: Sold, 17 August 1865, sank, 9 January 1874

General characteristics
- Tonnage: 652 GRT and 494 NRT
- Displacement: 828 tons
- Length: 199 ft (61 m)
- Beam: 27 ft (8.2 m)
- Propulsion: 2-cylinder steam engine; screw-propelled
- Speed: 11 knots
- Complement: not known
- Armament: two 30-pounder Parrott rifles; one 9-inch Dahlgren smooth bore; four 24-pounder howitzers

Princess Royal was a British merchant ship and blockade runner that became a cruiser in the Union Navy during the American Civil War and later returned to civilian service.

== British merchant service ==
Princess Royal was launched on 20 June 1861 by the Glasgow shipbuilders Tod & McGregor in 1861 as a passenger-cargo ship for the Liverpool services of M Langlands & Sons, Glasgow, their first iron screw steamer. She measured 652 gross and 494 net register tons, with a length of 200.5 ft (61.1 m), breadth 28.2 ft (8.6 m) and depth of hold 15.5 ft (4.7 m). The ship was powered by a two-cylinder steam engine of 150-170 nhp driving a single propeller. She was registered at Glasgow and entered service in July 1861.

In 1863 the Confederate Government had major contracts for large and specialised British manufactures, including steam engines and boilers for ironclads under construction at Charleston, South Carolina, heavy artillery and armament-making machinery. The government's UK representative, Fraser, Trenholm & Co, arranged the purchase of Princess Royal by private investors to carry these and other supplies direct to Charleston. The ship sailed from London on 8 December 1862 but called at Halifax, Nova Scotia, where Federal spies gained valuable information on the ship and her cargo. After a further call at Bermuda, Princess Royal sailed for Charleston, but in the early hours of 29 January 1863 she was seen as she approached the port entrance by the Federal blockade squadron and forced aground. The captain, pilot and some passengers and crew were able to escape before boarding parties from USS Unadilla and G. W. Blunt could arrive. The ship was sent to the Philadelphia Prize court for adjudication.

== US naval service ==
Princess Royal was purchased by the United States Navy from the prize court on 18 March 1863, fitted out as a cruiser and commissioned 29 May 1863, Commander Melancthon B. Woolsey in command.

Assigned to the West Gulf Blockading Squadron, Princess Royal participated in the engagement with Confederate forces at Donaldsonville, Louisiana, 28 June 1863. Then ordered to the Texas coast, she captured the British schooner Flying Scud near Matamoros, Tamaulipas 12 August, and assisted in seizing the schooner Wave 22 August. Continuing her patrols into 1864 she took Neptune off Brazos de Santiago, 19 November 1864; ran down the schooner Flash six days later; seized the schooner Alabama, 7 December; and captured Cora off Galveston, 19 December.

On 7 February 1865, she assisted in the capture of her last prize, the schooner Anna Sophia in Galveston Bay. Five months later Princess Royal was ordered north, arriving at Philadelphia 21 July. She was sold at public auction 17 August 1865.

== Post war ==
USS Princess Royal, now measuring 932 grt, was purchased by William F Weld & Co of Boston, renamed Sherman after the Federal general, and put onto the Boston-New York-New Orleans service. (Note: Some sources claim that this ship was the same as that involved in the General Sherman incident in Korea in 1866. That ship was a much smaller, side-paddle, wood hulled vessel which was destroyed by fire in the incident.)

On 8 January 1874, on a voyage from New York to New Orleans, Sherman sprang a leak off the North Carolina coast and anchored near Little River. The following day she sank off Cape Fear. The passengers and crew were saved, along with some cargo.

== See also ==
- Blockade runners of the American Civil War
- Blockade mail of the Confederacy
