= 36th Texas Cavalry Regiment =

- Active: 22 March 1862 – June 1865
- Country: Confederate States of America
- Allegiance: Confederate States of America, Texas
- Branch: Confederate States Army
- Type: Cavalry
- Size: Regiment (823 men, Mar. 1862)
- Nickname: Woods' Regiment
- Engagements: American Civil War; Battle of Mansfield (1864); Battle of Pleasant Hill (1864); Battle of Blair's Landing (1864); Battle of Yellow Bayou (1864)

Commanders
- Notable commanders: Col. Peter C. Woods

The 36th Texas Cavalry Regiment was a unit of mounted volunteers from Texas that fought in the Confederate States Army during the American Civil War. The regiment was organized in March 1862 at Belton, Texas and surgeon Peter C. Woods was appointed to command it. The unit patrolled the Texas Gulf Coast and then spent the winter of 1862–1863 at Port Lavaca, Texas. It marched to Brownsville, Texas, in spring 1863 and later joined Hamilton P. Bee's brigade. This brigade transferred to Louisiana where it fought at Mansfield, Pleasant Hill, Blair's Landing, and Yellow Bayou during the Red River campaign in 1864. Afterward, the regiment traveled to Crockett, Texas, and then Galveston, where it was present when the men were paroled in June 1865.

== See also ==
- List of Texas Civil War Confederate units
- Texas in the American Civil War

== Bibliography ==
- Derbes, Brett J. (2011). "Thirty-Sixth Texas Cavalry". Handbook of Texas Online.
- NPS (2022). "36th Regiment, Texas Cavalry: Battle Unit Details, The Civil War". National Park Service.
- Oates, Stephen B. (1994) [1961]. Confederate Cavalry West of the River. Austin, Tex.: University of Texas Press.
