= Battle of Kock's Plantation =

Battle of the American Civil War

Coordinates: 30.0865°N 91.0295°W

- Part of American Civil War
Date	July 12, 1863 – July 13, 1863
Location	Ascension Parish, Louisiana
Result	Confederate victory

Belligerents
United States (Union)	(Confederate States of America) CSA (Confederacy)

Commanders and leaders
Godfrey Weitzel; Cuvier Grover	Tom Green

Units involved
XIX Corps	

Strength
2 Divisions	2 Brigades

Casualties and losses
430	33

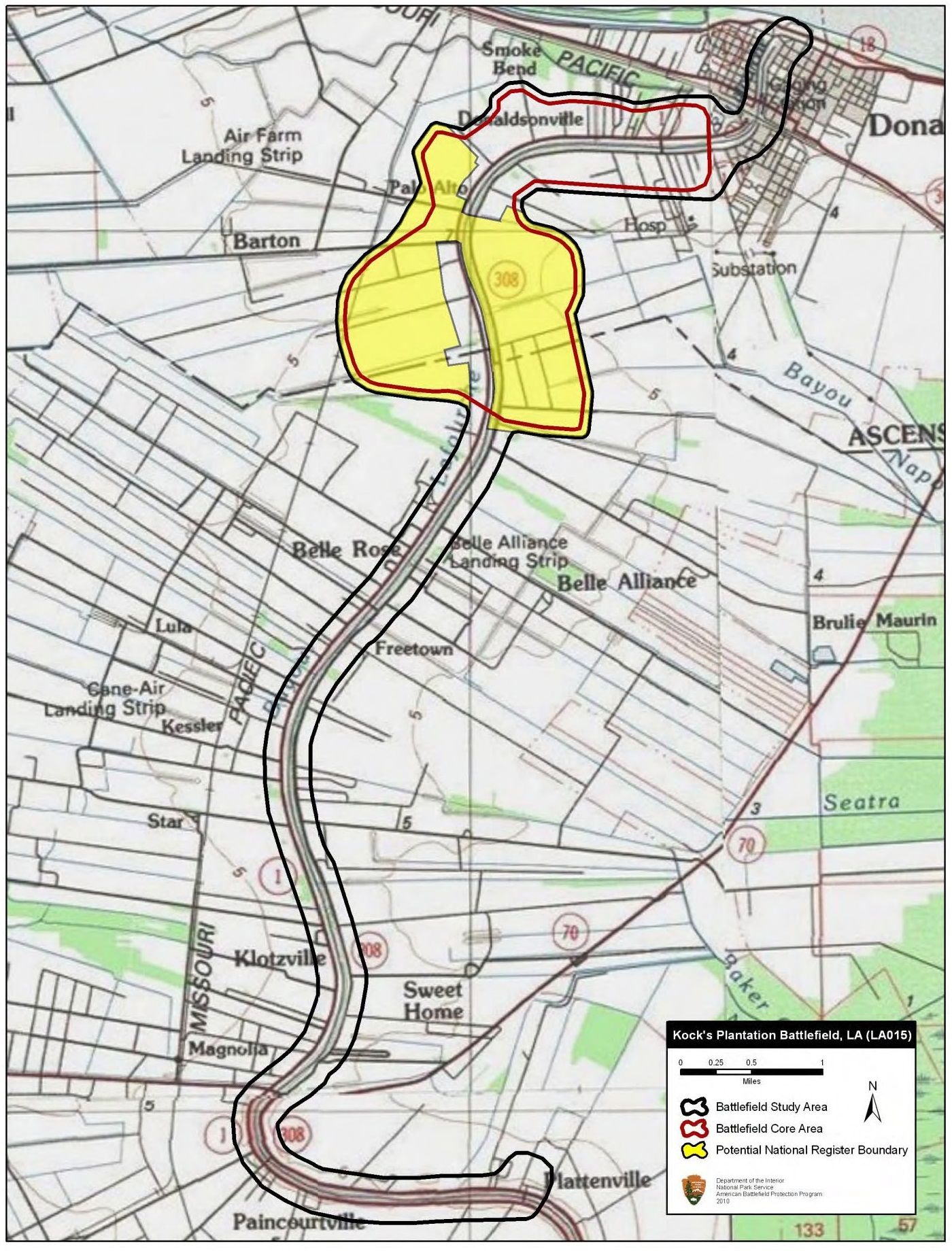
Map of Kock's Plantation Battlefield core and study areas by the American Battlefield Protection Program.

The Battle of Kock’s Plantation (also spelled Cox’s Plantation and Saint Emma Plantation) was fought July 12–13, 1863, in Ascension Parish, Louisiana, during the American Civil War. It was part of a campaign entitled "Taylor's Operations in West Louisiana (1863)." The Confederate States Army victory left them in control of much of the interior of the Acadiana region.

Following the surrender of Port Hudson, two Union divisions were shifted to Donaldsonville by transports, to move inland and pacify the interior. They marched up Bayou Lafourche, a division on each bank. Confederate Brig. Gen. Tom Green posted a brigade on the east side of the bayou and placed his second brigade on the other side.

As the Union forces advanced, skirmishing occurred on July 11 and 12. On the morning of the 13th, a foraging detachment set out along both banks of the bayou. Upon reaching Kock’s Plantation (Saint Emma Plantation), they met Rebel skirmishers that forced them back. Then, Green's Confederates flung their might against the Union troops, which kept retiring although they tried to make stands at various points. The Union troops eventually fell back to the protection of the guns in Fort Butler at Donaldsonville, about six miles from Kock’s Plantation. A much smaller Rebel force had routed the Yankees. The expedition failed, leaving the Confederates in control of the interior.

Estimated casualties: 463 total (US 430; CS 33)

The restored plantation house, built in 1847 by a leading sugar planter, is maintained as a private museum filled with period furnishings. It is located on Highway 1 South near Donaldsonville.
