= Battle of Albuquerque =

Battle of the American Civil War

Coordinates: 35.110703°N 106.609991°W

- Part of the Trans-Mississippi Theater of the American Civil War
Date	April 8, 1862–April 9, 1862
Location	Albuquerque, New Mexico
Result	Union victory

Belligerents
United States of America	Confederate States of America

Commanders and leaders
(United States) Edward R. S. Canby	(Confederate States of America) Henry Hopkins Sibley

Strength
~1,150	~850

Casualties and losses
1 killed Unknown wounded	None

The Battle of Albuquerque was a small engagement of the American Civil War in April 1862 between Confederate Brigadier General Henry Hopkins Sibley's Army of New Mexico and a Union force of the Department of New Mexico under Colonel Edward R. S. Canby.

== Battle ==
The Confederates were on the retreat from New Mexico Territory after the Battle of Glorieta Pass. On April 8, Sibley's 4th, 5th and 7th Texas Mounted Volunteers occupied Albuquerque for a second time as they retreated southeast to Texas. Colonel Canby moved his army up from Fort Craig to ascertain the strength of the Confederates in Albuquerque.

Canby's artillery opened fire at long range from the edge of town for two days. The Union artillery ceased firing when a local citizen informed Canby the Confederates would not permit the civilians to seek shelter. Canby felt he had accomplished his mission; he knew the Rebels were still willing to put up resistance. The Union demonstration also caused Colonel Tom Green to hastily pull out of Santa Fe and move to Sibley's aid, hoping to counterattack in the morning. Under cover of darkness Canby's forces slipped away without the rebels' knowledge.

Lacking the resources to take a large force captive, Canby hoped the Confederates would concentrate their forces together and move out of New Mexico in one unit. The rebels did indeed end their occupation of Albuquerque a few days later on April 12. Sibley left behind the sick and wounded along with eight mountain howitzers, buried near the edge of town.
