= Walter P. Lane =

Confederate general in American Civil War

Walter Paye Lane
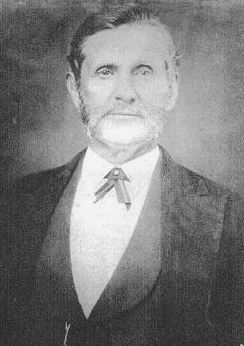
- Born: February 18, 1817; County Cork, Ireland, U.K.
- Died: January 28, 1892 (aged 74); Marshall, Texas
- Military career
- Allegiance: Republic of Texas; United States of America; Confederate States of America
- Branch: Army of the Republic of Texas; United States Army; Confederate States Army
- Service years: 1836 (Texas); 1846–1848 (USA); 1861–1865 (CSA)
- Rank: Major (USA); Brigadier General (CSA)
- Conflicts: Texas Revolution; Mexican–American War: Battle of Monterey; American Civil War: Battle of Wilson's Creek; Battle of Chustenahlah; Battle of Pea Ridge; Siege of Corinth; Second Battle of Corinth; Battle of Franklin; Battle of Mansfield

Walter Paye Lane (February 18, 1817 – January 28, 1892) was a Confederate general during the American Civil War who also served in the armies of the Republic of Texas and the United States of America.

== Early life ==
Lane was born in County Cork, Ireland. The Lane family emigrated to Fairview in Guernsey County, Ohio, in 1821, and moved to Kentucky in 1825. In 1836 Lane moved to Texas to participate in its war for independence against Mexico. After Texas had gained its independence, Lane lived in San Augustine County in East Texas and then San Antonio, where he briefly served as a Texas Ranger. In 1846 Lane joined the 1st Regiment of Texas Mounted Rifle Volunteers as a first lieutenant to fight in the Mexican–American War. Lane fought with honors at the Battle of Monterrey and was later given the rank of major and command of his own battalion. After the Mexican–American War, Lane wandered about doing various things in Arizona, California, and Peru before opening a mercantile business in Marshall, Texas, in 1858.

== Civil War ==
When the Civil War broke out, Lane was among the first Texans to call for secession. Lane's military reputation was so great that the first volunteer Confederate company raised in Harrison County was named for him, though Lane would join the 3rd Texas Cavalry. Lane participated in the battles of Wilson's Creek, Missouri, Chustenahlah, Pea Ridge and both the Siege of Corinth and Second Battle of Corinth. Lane led the 3rd Texas at the battle of Franklin, Mississippi, and was commended by General P.G.T. Beauregard for his efforts. Lane was severely wounded in the Battle of Mansfield in 1864, where Confederates forces rebuffed a push to capture either or both Shreveport, Louisiana, or Marshall, Texas. Before the war ended, Lane was promoted to the rank of brigadier general in 1865, being confirmed on the last day the Confederate Congress met.

== Postbellum career ==
After the Civil War Lane returned to Marshall where he helped to establish the Texas Veterans Association. He died in Marshall, Texas, and is buried in the Marshall Cemetery near downtown Marshall. His memoirs, The Adventures and Recollections of General Walter P. Lane, were published posthumously in 1928.

== See also ==
- List of American Civil War generals (Confederate)
