= James Patrick Major =

U.S. Army officer, Confederate brigadier general during the American Civil War

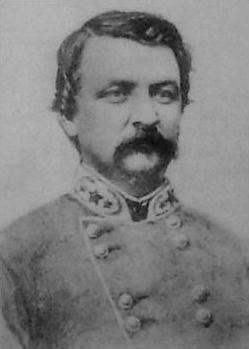
- James Patrick Major
- Born: May 14, 1836; Fayette, Missouri, U.S.
- Died: May 8, 1877 (aged 40); Austin, Texas, U.S.
- Burial place: Donaldsonville, Louisiana, U.S.
- Relatives: Governor of Louisiana Paul Octave Hébert (brother-in-law)
- Military career
- Allegiance: United States of America; Confederate States of America
- Branch: United States Army; Confederate States Army
- Service years: 1856–1861 (USA); 1861–1865 (CSA)
- Rank: Second Lieutenant (USA); Brigadier General (CSA)
- Conflicts: Comanche Wars; American Civil War: Battle of Wilson's Creek; Vicksburg Campaign; Red River Campaign

James Patrick Major (May 14, 1836 – May 8, 1877) was a U.S. Army officer and a Confederate brigadier general during the American Civil War.

== U.S. Cavalry service ==
Major graduated 23rd in his class at the United States Military Academy and became a second lieutenant in the United States Cavalry in July 1856. He served on the Texas frontier and participated in the Battle of Wichita Village against the Comanche in 1858.

== Confederate States Army ==
Major resigned from the U. S. Army on March 21, 1861, and joined the Missouri State Guard as a lieutenant colonel. He fought in the Battle of Wilson's Creek on August 10, 1861. He was an acting commander in Earl Van Dorn's artillery during the Siege of Vicksburg. He was transferred to the trans-Mississippi theater and promoted to brigadier general in July 1863 and commanded a cavalry division in the Red River Campaign.

In 1864, he fought at both Mansfield and Pleasant Hill during the Red River Campaign and with General Hamilton P. Bee at Monett's Ferry in Natchitoches Parish, Louisiana.

== Post war ==
After the war, Major went to France and then returned to Louisiana and later to Texas where he died on May 8, 1877. He is buried in Donaldsonville, Ascension Parish, Louisiana in an ornate tomb in the Ascension of our Lord Catholic Church Cemetery.

== See also ==
- List of American Civil War generals (Confederate)
