= American Battlefield Protection Program =

United States federal government program

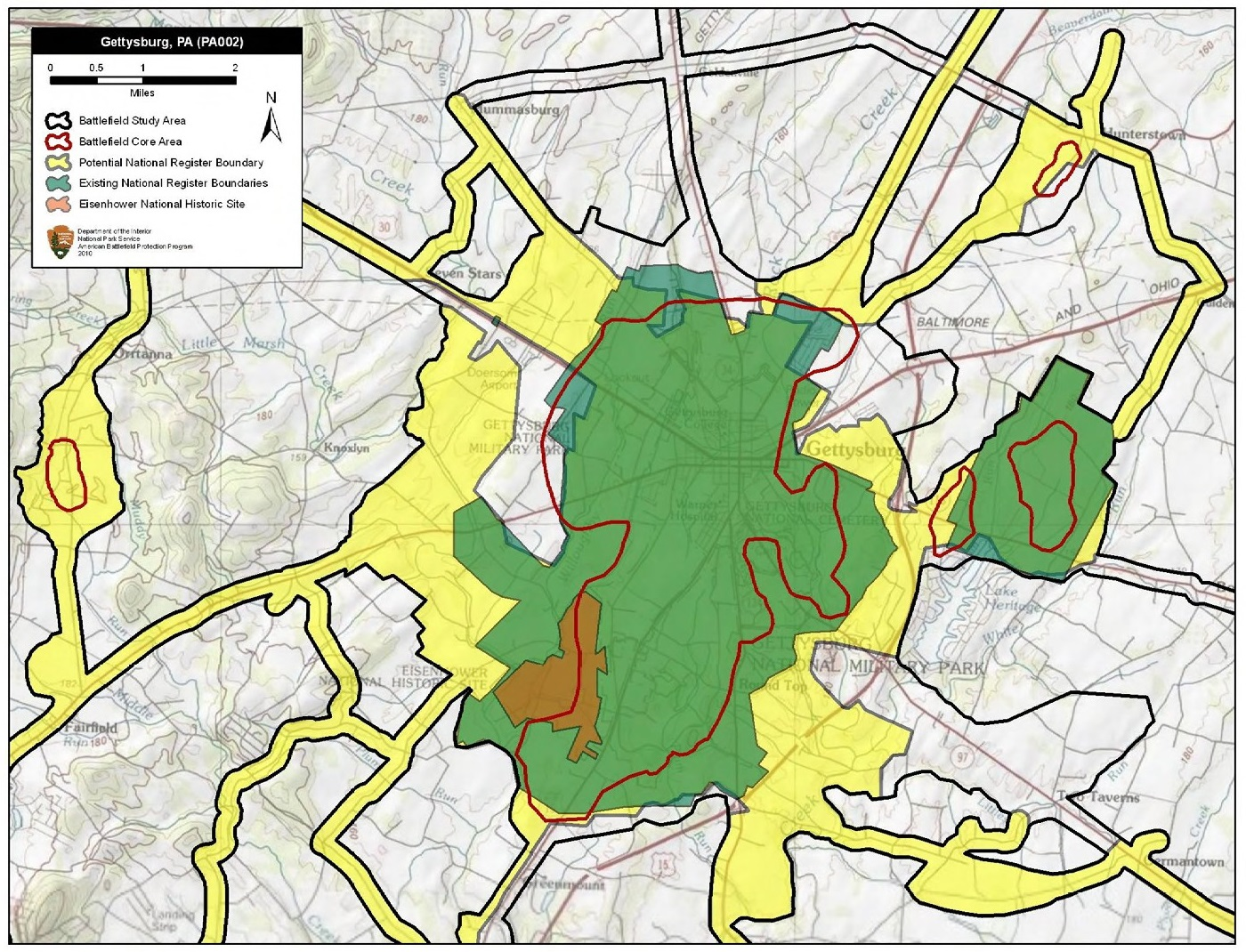
A map of the Battle of Gettysburg core and study areas prepared by the American Battlefield Protection Program

The American Battlefield Protection Program (ABPP) is a United States federal government program created by the secretary of the interior in 1991, with the aim of preserving historic battlefields in the United States. In 1996, Congress signed into law the American Battlefield Protection Act, which officially authorized the ABPP. The program operates under the American Battlefield Protection Program Authorization as of 2009.

The ABPP promotes the preservation of significant historic battlefields associated with wars on American soil (see List of wars involving the United States). The goals of the program are 1) to protect battlefields and sites associated with armed conflicts that influenced the course of our history, 2) to encourage and assist all Americans in planning for the preservation, management, and interpretation of these sites, and 3) to raise awareness of the importance of preserving battlefields and related sites for future generations. The ABPP focuses primarily on land use, cultural resource and site management planning, and public education. The American Battlefield Protection Program administers three separate grant programs, awarding Battlefield Preservation Planning Grants, Battlefield Land Acquisition Grants, and Battlefield Interpretation Grants.

== Battlefield Preservation Studies ==
At the direction of Congress the American Battlefield Protection Program has periodically identified, surveyed, and assessed the preservation needs at significant sites associated with the American Revolution, the Civil War, and the War of 1812.

In addition to these studies, the ABPP has either undertaken or supported the identification, survey, and assessment of many other battles associated with additional wars ranging from 16th-century contact encounters to World War II actions in the Pacific.

=== State by State Updates to the Civil War Sites Advisory Commission Report (2011) ===
Congress authorized the Civil War Battlefield Preservation Act of 2002 tasking the American Battlefield Protection Program with producing an update to the 1993 Civil War Sites Advisory Commission Report on the Nation’s Civil War Battlefields. Congress required that the update address 1)preservation activities carried out at the battlefields since 1993 2) changes in the condition of the battlefields since 1993 and 3)any other relevant developments relating to the battlefields since 1993.

The American Battlefield Protection Program produced 25 updated reports, by state. The purpose of the reports are to presents information about Civil War battlefields for use by Congress, federal, state, and local government agencies, landowners, and other interest groups to enable them to act quickly and proactively to preserve and protect nationally significant Civil War battlefields; and to create partnerships among state and local governments, regional entities, and the private sector to preserve, conserve, and enhance nationally significant Civil War battlefields.

=== Revolutionary War and War of 1812 Study (2007) ===
Congress authorized the Revolutionary War and War of 1812 Historic Preservation Study in 1996 because many historic sites of the American Revolutionary War and War of 1812 were at risk from rapid urban or suburban development. The goals of the study were 1) to gather current information about the significance of, current condition of, and threats to the Revolutionary War and War of 1812 sites and 2) to present preservation and interpretation alternatives for the sites.

The American Battlefield Protection Program identified and documented 677 significant places associated with the Revolutionary War and War of 1812. The 2007 Report to Congress on the Historic Preservation of Revolutionary War and War of 1812 Sites in the United States presented information about at-risk Revolutionary War and War of 1812 battlefields and associated properties for consideration by Federal, State, tribal, municipal, non-profit, and private entities.

=== Mexican American War Battlefields (2004) ===
The National Park Service, Cultural Resources Geographical Information System Facility (CRGIS) undertook, on behalf of the American Battlefield Protection Program, a study of the significant Mexican–American War battlefields in the United States. CRGIS identified thirteen battlefields in California, New Mexico, and Texas. Each battlefield was documented, battlefield boundaries were drawn, and each site was assessed for threats, integrity, and preservation needs. CRGIS presented maps and final assessments for each battlefield to the American Battlefield Protection Program in 2004.

=== Civil War Sites Advisory Commission Report on the Nation's Civil War Battlefields (1993) ===
Congress established the Civil War Sites Advisory Commission in 1990 to identify significant Civil War sites, determine their condition, assess threats to their integrity, and offer alternatives for their preservation and interpretation. Because of limited time and resources, the Commission concentrated on battlefields as the central focus of the Civil War, and of many contemporary historic preservation decisions.

The Commission identified 384 battlefields as the principal battles of the war and classified them according to their historic significance. The battlefields were surveyed and assessed for landscape integrity, threats, and preservation needs. A final report was presented to Congress in 1993. The Commission sunset in 1993, however, the American Battlefield Protection Program continues to implement parts of the Commission's mission and recommendations.

=== Shenandoah Valley Study (1992) ===
In 1990 Congress authorized a study of Civil War sites in the Shenandoah Valley of Virginia. The study was to accomplish four tasks: identify significant Civil War sites and determine their condition, establish their relative importance, assess short and long term threats to their integrity, and provide alternatives for their preservation and interpretation by Federal, State, and local governments, or by other public or private entities.

The study defined the Shenandoah Valley as comprising eight Virginia counties—Augusta, Clarke, Frederick, Highland, Page, Rockingham, Shenandoah, and Warren. Fifteen battle events of major significance were identified and documented and a final report detailing each battlefields' landscape integrity, risk, and preservation needs was presented to Congress in 1992.

== Definitions ==
In order to focus closely on battlefield lands and their associated properties, the American Battlefield Protection Program has developed program specific definitions for both property types that help them meet their stated mission of promoting battlefield preservation. The definitions are:

- Battlefield Land - Sites where armed conflict, fighting, or warfare occurred between two opposing military organizations or forces recognized as such by their respective cultures (not civil unrest).

- Associated Sites – Sites occupied before, during, or after a battle at which events occurred that had a direct influence on the tactical development of the battle or the outcome of the battle. A site must be associated with a battle in order to be considered an Associated Site.
