= Thomas Green (general) =

American politician and military officer

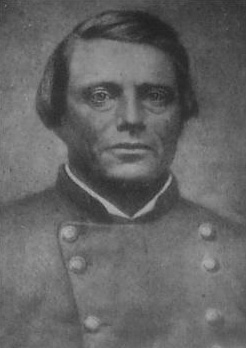
- Born: June 8, 1814; Buckingham County, Virginia, U.S.
- Died: April 12, 1864 (aged 49); Red River Parish, Louisiana, C.S.
- Burial place: Austin, Texas
- Military career
- Allegiance: Republic of Texas; United States; Confederate States
- Branch: Army of the Republic of Texas; United States Army; Confederate States Army
- Service years: 1835–1840 (Texas); 1846–1848 (USA); 1861–1864 (CSA)
- Rank: Major (Texas); Captain (USA); Brigadier General (CSA)
- Nickname: Tom
- Unit: First Texas Regiment of Mounted Riflemen
- Commands: 5th Texas Mounted Rifles
- Conflicts: Texas Revolution; Battle of San Jacinto; Somervell Expedition; Comanche War; Mexican–American War; American Civil War; Battle of Valverde; Battle of Bayou Bourbeux; Red River Campaign; Battle of Pleasant Hill; Battle of Blair's Landing †

Thomas Green (June 8, 1814 – April 12, 1864) was an American military officer and lawyer who took part in the Texas Revolution of 1835–36, serving under Sam Houston, who rewarded him with a land grant. Green was clerk of the Texas Supreme Court until the outbreak of the American Civil War, when he became a Confederate cavalry leader. After winning several victories, including the Battle of Valverde and the recapture of Galveston, he was promoted brigadier and assigned command of the cavalry division of the Trans-Mississippi Department. In the Red River Campaign, he was mortally wounded while charging a fleet of Federal gunboats. The Union naval commander David Dixon Porter paid tribute to Green as a serious loss to the Confederacy.

== Early life and career ==
Green was born in Buckingham County in Virginia to Nathan and Mary (Field) Green. The family moved to Tennessee in 1817. He did coursework at Jackson College and Cumberland College (Princeton, Kentucky) before completing a degree at the University of Tennessee at Knoxville in 1834. Reading law with his father, a judge on the Tennessee Supreme Court was how he prepared for the legal profession.

When the Texas Revolution began, Green left Tennessee to join the rebel volunteers. He arrived in Nacogdoches in December 1835, and enlisted in Isaac N. Moreland's company on January 14, 1836. During the April 21 Battle of San Jacinto, Green helped operate the famed "Twin Sisters" cannons, the only artillery present in Sam Houston's army. A few days after the decisive victory, Houston rewarded Green with a commission as a lieutenant. In early May, he was promoted to major and assigned as the aide-de-camp to General Thomas J. Rusk. With hostilities over, Green resigned on May 30 and returned to Tennessee to resume studying law.

In 1837, the legislature of the new Republic of Texas granted large tracts of land to leading veterans of the Revolution, including Green. After relocating to Fayette County, Green became a county surveyor at La Grange. That same year, fellow San Jacinto veteran William W. Gant nominated Green for the position of engrossing clerk for the Texas House of Representatives. He was subsequently elected and held the office until 1839 when he represented Fayette County in the House of Representatives in the Fourth Texas Congress. After a single term, he chose to resume the clerkship. During the Sixth and Eighth Texas Congresses, he served as secretary of the Senate. From 1841 to 1861, he was clerk of the Texas Supreme Court, during the republic and the subsequent U.S. statehood phases.

During his legislative career, Green continued his involvement with Texas's military. He participated in John H. Moore's 1840 campaign against the Comanches up the Colorado River. When Mexican general Ráfael Vásquez briefly occupied San Antonio in March 1842, Green recruited the Travis County Volunteers and stood as their captain; the unit was not involved in combat. In response to this and two other Mexican incursions, Texas launched the punitive Somervell Expedition against Mexico; Green served as its inspector general. In the Mexican–American War, Green recruited a company of Texas Rangers from LaGrange and served as their captain during the 1846 U.S. capture of Monterrey in the state of Nuevo León.

Green married Mary Wallace Chalmers, daughter of the editor and politician John Gordon Chalmers, in 1847. The couple would have six children.

== Civil War ==
After Texas seceded in early 1861, Green was elected colonel of the 5th Texas Cavalry Regiment, which, as part of a brigade led by Brig. Gen. Henry H. Sibley, joined the invasion of New Mexico Territory in 1862. There, Green led the Confederate victory at the Battle of Valverde in February. After a difficult retreat into Texas, he led his men, aboard the river steamer Bayou City, to assist in the recapture of Galveston on January 1, 1863. He was also involved in the seizure of the Union steamer Harriet Lane that same day.

=== Bayou Teche Campaign ===
In the spring of 1863, Green commanded the First Cavalry Brigade in Richard Taylor's division in the fighting along Bayou Teche in Louisiana. He was promoted to brigadier general, May 20, 1863. In June, he captured a Union garrison at Brashear City, but failed to seize Fort Butler on the Mississippi River. Green's cavalry routed advancing Union troops under Godfrey Weitzel and Cuvier Grover at Koch's (Cox's) Plantation on July 13. In September, the First Cavalry Brigade captured another Union detachment at Stirling's Plantation. A similar success followed in November at the Battle of Bayou Bourbeux. In four victories, Green's men inflicted about 3,000 casualties and suffered only 600 losses. Green was subsequently assigned command of the cavalry division of the Trans-Mississippi Department.

=== Red River Campaign ===
Green's grave in Oakwood Cemetery in Austin, Texas

During the Red River Campaign, Green led his division of cavalry from Texas to reinforce Taylor in Louisiana to stop the advance of Maj. Gen. Nathaniel P. Banks toward Shreveport. Green participated in the Battle of Mansfield and the Battle of Pleasant Hill. A few days later, on April 12, 1864, Green was mortally wounded by a shell from a Federal gunboat while leading an attack on the gunboats patrolling the Red River at Blair’s Landing. He soon died on Blair's Plantation. Upon his death, Union Admiral David Dixon Porter paid tribute to the fallen Confederate cavalryman in saying that Green was "one in whom the rebels place more confidence than anyone else. He led his men to the very edge of the bank, they shouting and yelling like madmen—losing General Green had paralyzed them; he was worth 5,000 men to them." He is buried in the family plot at Oakwood Cemetery in Austin, Texas.

== Memorials ==
- Tom Green Street in Brenham, Texas is named for Green
- Tom Green Street in Austin, Texas is named for Green
- Tom Green County, Texas (1875) is named for Green
- USS Tom Green County (1953–1972) was indirectly named for Green.

== See also ==
- List of American Civil War generals (Confederate)
