= Battle of Bayou Bourbeux =

Battle of the American Civil War

Coordinates: 30°24′45″N 92°5′23″W

- Part of the American Civil War
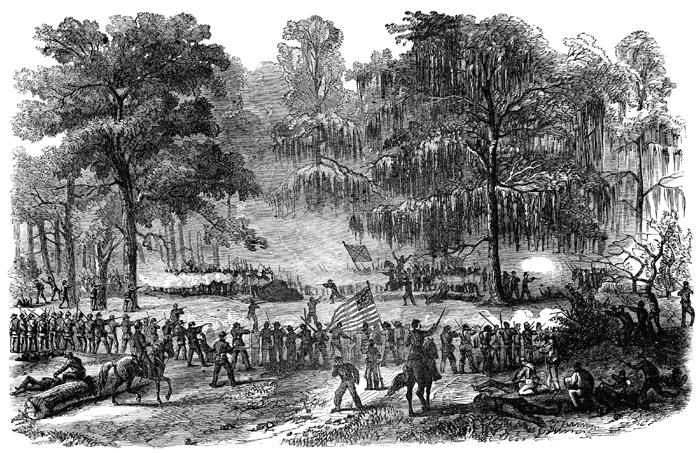
- Attack on the Sixtieth Indiana. Frank Leslie, artist
Date	November 3, 1863
Location	St. Landry Parish, Louisiana
Result	Confederate victory

Belligerents
United States of America	Confederate States of America

Commanders and leaders
(United States) Stephen Burbridge	(Confederate States of America) Thomas Green

Units involved
(United States) XIII Corps	(Confederate States of America) Green's Division

Strength
1,625	6,000

Casualties and losses
26 killed, 124 wounded, 566 missing	22 killed, 103 wounded

The Battle of Bayou Bourbeux also known as the Battle of Grand Coteau, Battle of Boggy Creek or the Battle of Carrion Crow Bayou (Carencro is the Cajun French word for buzzard), which is present day Carencro Bayou, was fought in southwestern Louisiana west of the town of Grand Coteau, during the American Civil War.

The engagement was between the forces of Confederate Brigadier General Thomas Green and Union Brigadier General Stephen G. Burbridge.

== Battle ==
Under orders from Major General Richard Taylor, Green launched the attack on the Union camp after receiving three infantry regiments on November 2, 1863. These regiments were led by Colonel Oran M. Roberts.

Lieutenant William Marland of the 2nd Massachusetts Battery earned the Congressional Medal of Honor for his actions during this battle.

The Federals reported casualties of 26 killed, 124 wounded, and 566 captured or missing. The Confederates admitted a loss of 22 killed and 103 wounded.
