= Battle of Mansfield =

1864 battle of the American Civil War

- Part of the American Civil War
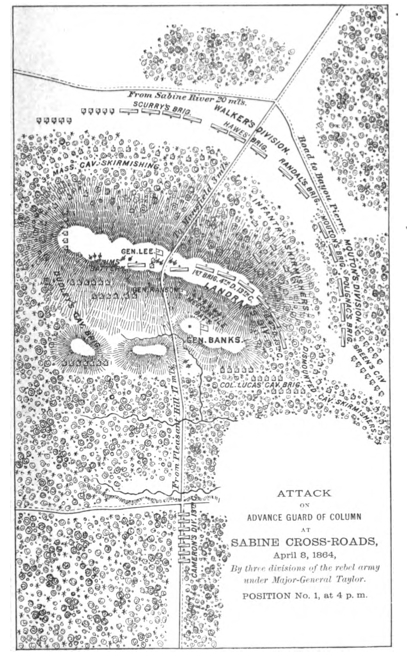
- Map of the battlefield, 1891
Date	April 8, 1864 (162 years ago)
Location	DeSoto Parish, Louisiana 32.0121°N 93.6652°W
Result	Confederate victory

Belligerents
Confederate States	United States (Union)

Commanders and leaders
(Confederate States of America) Richard Taylor	(United States) Nathaniel P. Banks

Units involved
Army of Western Louisiana	Army of the Gulf

Strength
8,800 to 9,000 engaged	20,000 (12,000 engaged)

Casualties and losses
1,000 total	2,235 total; 113 killed; 581 wounded; 1,541 captured/missing
- Location in Louisiana

The Battle of Mansfield, also known as the Battle of Sabine Crossroads, on April 8, 1864, in Louisiana formed part of the Red River Campaign during the American Civil War, when Union forces were attempting to occupy the Louisiana state capital, Shreveport.

The Confederate commander, Major-General Richard Taylor, chose Mansfield as the place where he would make his stand against the advancing Union army under General Nathaniel P. Banks. Taylor concentrated his forces at Sabine Crossroads, knowing that reinforcements were nearby. Banks prepared for a fight, though his own army was not fully assembled either. Both sides were reinforced by stages throughout the day.

After a brief resistance, the Union army was routed by the Confederates, consisting mainly of units from Louisiana and Texas, reportedly strengthened by hundreds of men breaking parole. The Battle of Mansfield was followed immediately by the Battle of Pleasant Hill.

== Prelude ==
During the second half of March 1864, a combined force from the Union Army of the Gulf and navy led by Major General Nathaniel P. Banks, supported by Admiral David Porter's fleet of gunboats, ascended the Red River with the goal of defeating the Confederate forces in Louisiana and capturing Shreveport. By April 1 Union forces had occupied Grand Ecore and Natchitoches. While the accompanying gunboat fleet with a portion of the infantry continued up the river, the main force followed the road inland toward Mansfield, where Banks knew his opponent was concentrating.

Major General Richard Taylor, in command of the Confederate forces in Louisiana, had retreated up the Red River in order to connect with reinforcements from Texas and Arkansas. Taylor selected a clearing a few miles south of Mansfield as the spot where he would take a stand against the Union forces. Sending his cavalry to harass the Union vanguard as it approached, Taylor called his infantry divisions forward.

The morning of April 8 found Banks's army stretched out along a single road through the woods between Natchitoches and Mansfield. When the cavalry at the front of the column found the Confederates taking a strong position along the edge of a clearing, they stopped and called for infantry support. Riding to the front, Banks decided that he would fight Taylor at that spot, and he ordered all his infantry to hurry up the road. It became a race to see which side could bring its forces to the front first.

== Opposing forces ==
=== Confederate ===
At the start of the battle, Taylor had approximately 9,000 troops consisting of Brigadier General Alfred Mouton's Louisiana/Texas infantry division, Major General John G. Walker's Texas infantry division, Brigadier General Thomas Green's Texas cavalry division, and Colonel William Vincent's Louisiana cavalry brigade. He had also called on the 5,000 men in the divisions of Brigadier General Thomas J. Churchill and Brigadier General Mosby M. Parsons that had been encamped near Keachi, between Mansfield and Shreveport. These troops arrived late in the afternoon, after the battle had commenced.

Eyewitness accounts indicate that there were additional Louisiana men in the ranks. This included paroled soldiers from units that had surrendered at Vicksburg, including many members of company B of the 17th Louisiana Regiment, the Sabine Rebels. Historian Gary Joiner claimed that "there may have been from several hundred to several thousand of them." The Confederate Governor of Louisiana, Henry Watkins Allen, had organized two battalions of the state guard and brought them to Taylor's aid, yet the documentary record is unclear as to what role they played in the battle. Joseph Blessington, a soldier in Walker's division, wrote that, "The Louisiana militia, under command of Governor Allen, was held in reserve, in case of an emergency." In addition, Blessington wrote that, from the surrounding communities, "old men shouldered their muskets and came to our assistance".

=== Union ===
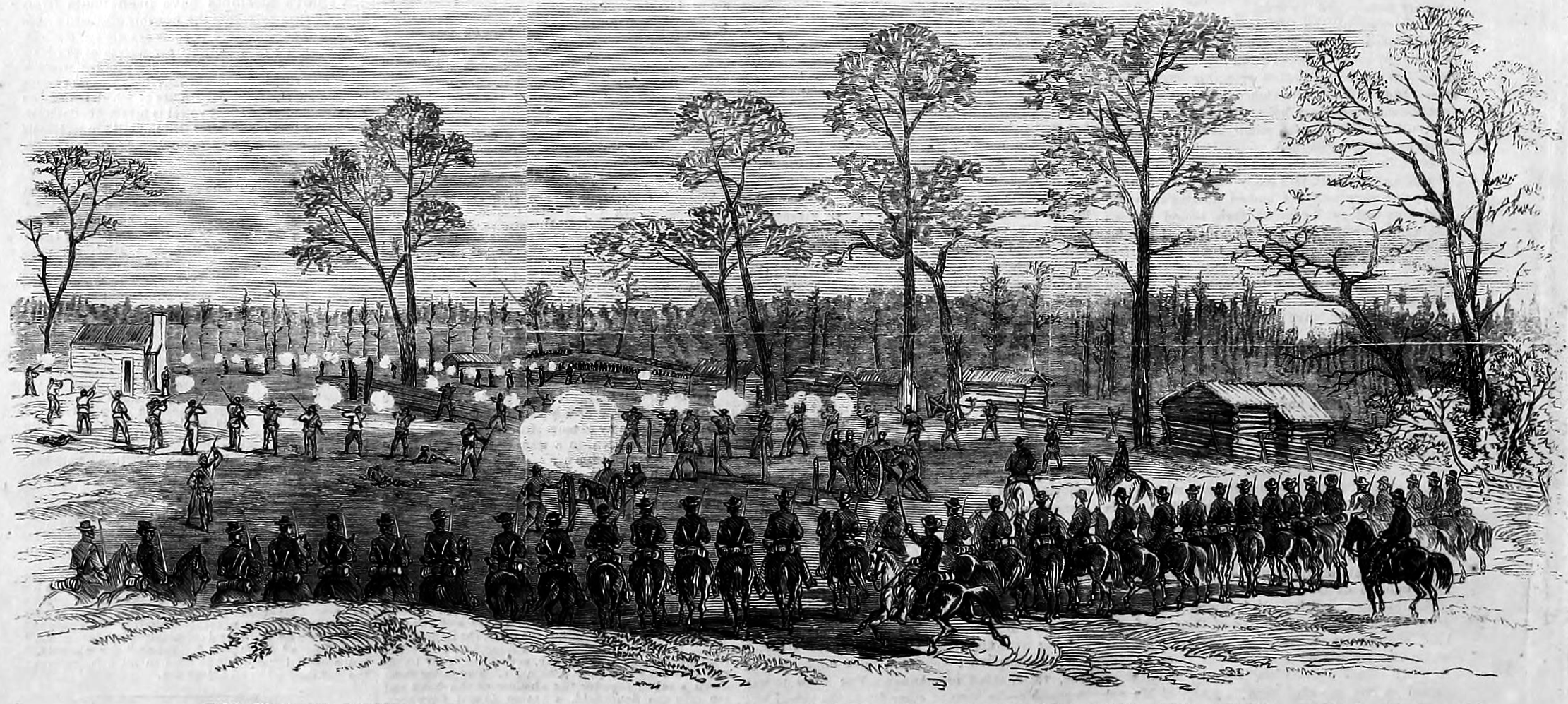
Battle of Wilson's Plantation, between Gen. Lee and the Rebel Gen. Green

At the start of the battle, the Union forces consisted of a cavalry division commanded by Brigadier General Albert L. Lee, consisting of approximately 3,500 men, and the 4th Division of the XIII Corps, commanded by Colonel William J. Landram, consisting of approximately 2,500 men. During the battle, the 3rd Division of the XIII Corps, commanded by General Robert A. Cameron, arrived with approximately 1,500 men. The battle ended when the pursuing Confederates met the 1st Division of the XIX Corps, commanded by Brigadier General William H. Emory, with approximately 5,000 men, including the 47th Pennsylvania Infantry Regiment, the only regiment from the Keystone State to fight in the Union's 1864 Red River Campaign. Thomas E. G. Ransom commanded the XIII Corps during the engagement, while the XIX Corps was commanded by William B. Franklin.

== Battle ==
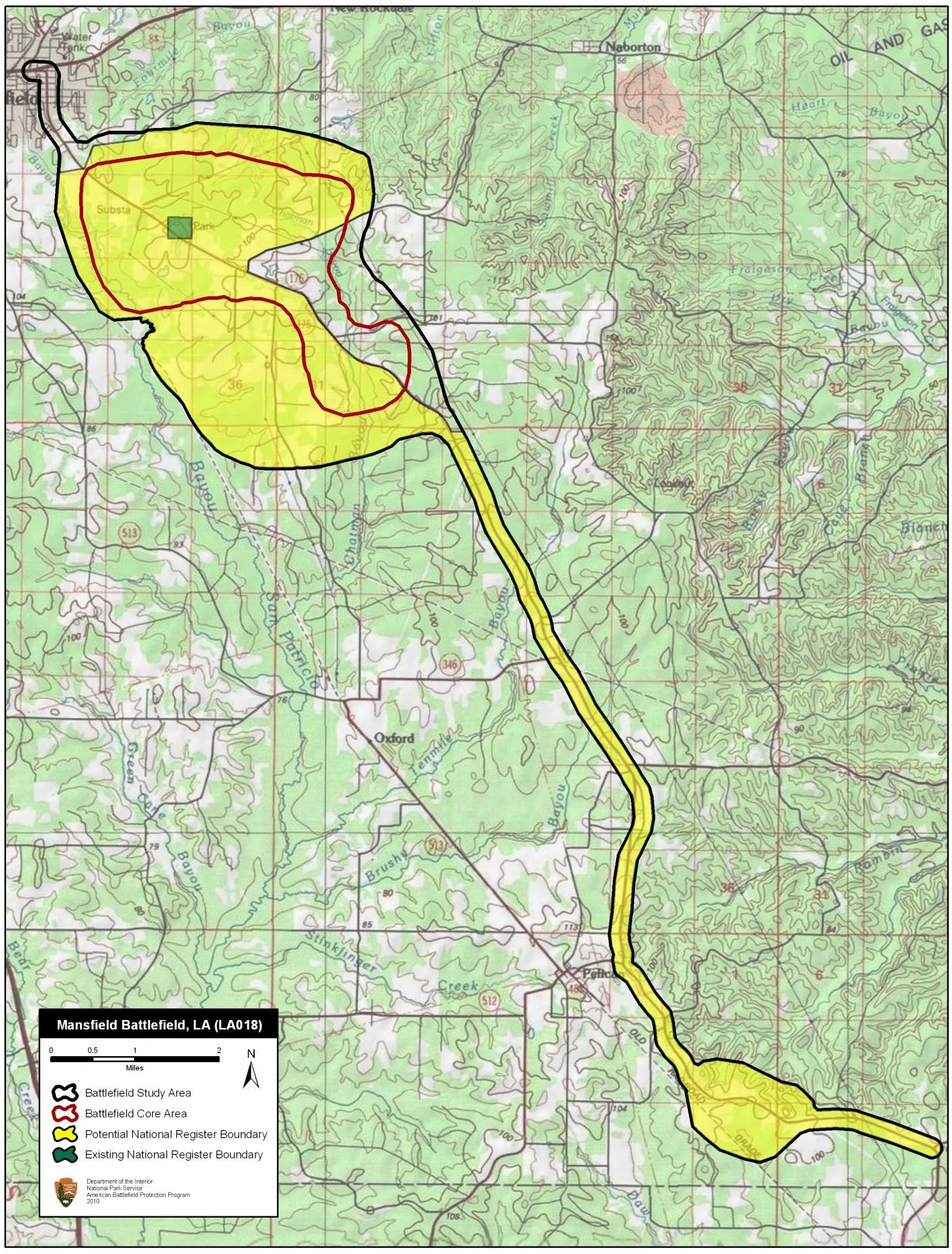
Map of Mansfield Battlefield core and study areas by the American Battlefield Protection Program

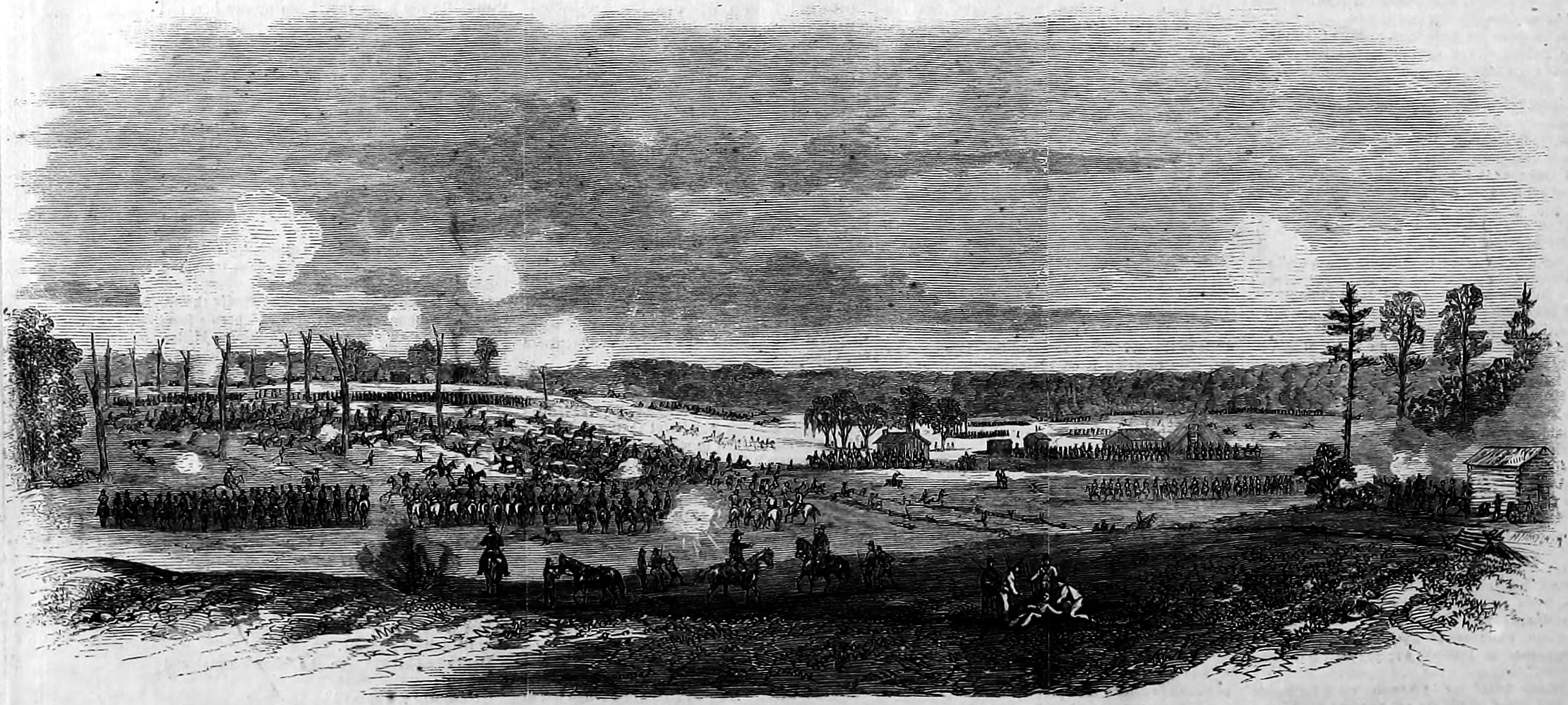
The battle between Gen. Banks force and that of General Dick Taylor,

During the morning, Taylor positioned Mouton's division on the east side of the clearing. Walker's division arrived in the afternoon and formed on Mouton's right. As Green's cavalry fell back from the advancing Union forces, two brigades moved to Mouton's flank and the third to Walker's flank. The Arkansas division arrived around 3:30 pm but was sent to watch a road to the east. The Missouri division did not arrive until around 6:00 pm, after the battle was fought.

At around noon, the Union cavalry division, supported by one infantry brigade of Landram's division, was deployed across a small hill at the south end of the clearing. Shortly thereafter the other brigade of Landram's division arrived. Cameron's division was on its way, but would not get there until the battle had already begun.

For about two hours the two sides faced each other across the clearing as Banks waited for more of his troops to arrive and Taylor arranged his men. At that point, Taylor enjoyed a numerical advantage over Banks. At about 4:00 pm, the Confederates surged forward. On the east side of the road, Mouton was killed, while several of his regimental commanders were hit as well and the charge of his division was repulsed. However, west of the road, Walker's Texas division wrapped around the Union position, folding it in on itself. Ransom was wounded trying to rally his men and was carried from the field; hundreds of Union troops were captured and the rest retreated in a panic. As the first Union line collapsed, Cameron's division was arriving to form a second line but it too was pushed back by the charging Confederates, with Franklin wounded as well but remaining on the field in command. For several miles the Confederates pursued the retreating Union troops until they encountered a third line formed by Emory's division. The Confederates launched several charges on the Union line but were repulsed, while nightfall ended the battle.

== Aftermath ==
The Union forces had suffered 113 killed, 581 wounded, and 1,541 captured as well as the loss of 20 cannons, 156 wagons, and a thousand horses and mules, killed or captured. More than half of the Union casualties were from four regiments – 77th Illinois, 130th Illinois, 19th Regiment Kentucky Volunteer Infantry and 48th Ohio. Most of the Union casualties occurred in the XIII Corps, while the XIX Corps lost few men.

Kirby Smith reported that Confederate loss was "about 1,000 killed and wounded" at Mansfield, but precise details of Confederate losses were not recorded. The local town of Keachi converted its women's college into a hospital and morgue on its second floor. One hundred soldiers' remains are marked nearby in Keachi's Confederate Cemetery, maintained by the local Sons of Confederate Veterans and Daughters of the Confederacy.

After the Union troops retreated, they fought Confederates again on April 9 at the Battle of Pleasant Hill.

== Battlefield preservation ==
On April 7, 2017, the American Battlefield Trust (then known as The Civil War Trust) announced that it had joined with Cleco, a regional energy company, to preserve 14.5 acres (5.9 ha) of the Mansfield Battlefield. The property was a donation from Cleco and was the first parcel associated with the battle's final phase that was preserved. Including the 14.5 acres, the Trust and its partners have acquired and preserved 455 acres (184 ha) of the battlefield.
