= Louisiana in the American Civil War =

Coordinates: 31°N 92°W

Louisiana
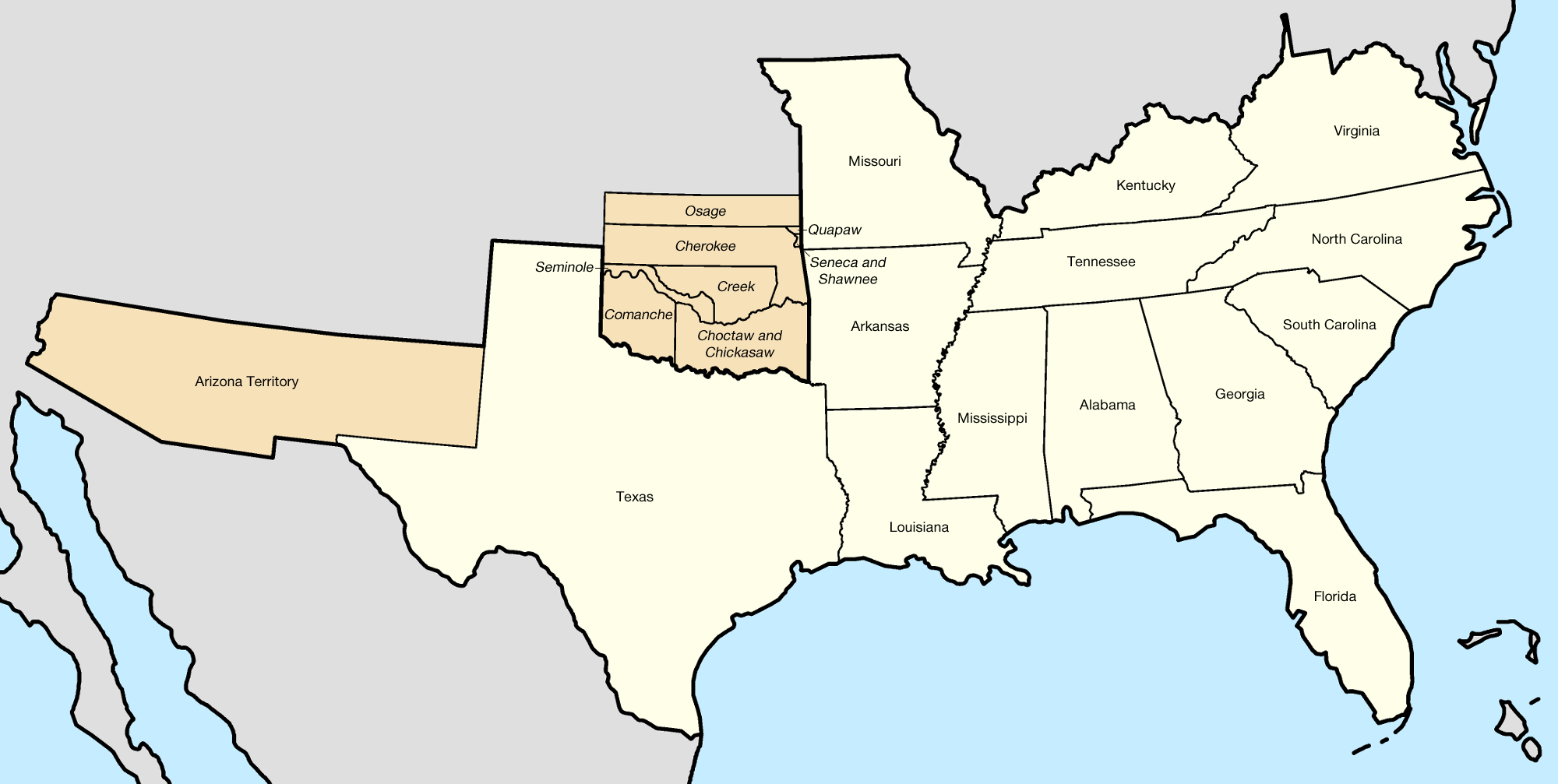
- Flag Map of the Confederate States
- Capital: Shreveport
- Largest city: New Orleans
- Admitted to the Confederacy: March 21, 1861 (3rd)
- Population: 708,002 total; • 376,276 (53.15%) free; • 331,726 (46.85%) slave
- Forces supplied: - Confederate troops: 50,000; Union troops: 29,000-34,000 (24,000 black; 5,000-10,000 white) total
- Governor: Thomas Moore; Henry Allen
- Lieutenant Governor: Henry M. Hyams; Benjamin W. Pearce
- Senators: Thomas Jenkins Semmes; Edward Sparrow
- Representatives: List
- Restored to the Union: July 9, 1868

Louisiana was a dominant population center in the southwest of the Confederate States of America, controlling the wealthy trade center of New Orleans, and contributing the French Creole and Cajun populations to the demographic composition of a predominantly Anglo-American country. In the antebellum period, Louisiana was a slave state, where enslaved African Americans had comprised the majority of the population during the eighteenth-century French and Spanish dominations. By the time the United States acquired the territory (1803) and Louisiana became a state (1812), the institution of slavery was entrenched. By 1860, 47% of the state's population were enslaved, though the state also had one of the largest free black populations in the United States. Much of the white population, particularly in the cities, supported slavery, while pockets of support for the U.S. and its government existed in the more rural areas.

Louisiana declared that it had seceded from the Union on January 26, 1861. Civil-War era New Orleans, the largest city in the South, was strategically important as a port city due to its southernmost location on the Mississippi River and its access to the Gulf of Mexico. The U.S. War Department early on planned for its capture. The city was taken by U.S. Army forces on April 25, 1862. Because a large part of the population had Union sympathies (or compatible commercial interests), the U.S. government took the unusual step of designating the areas of Louisiana then under U.S. control as a state within the Union, with its own elected representatives to the U.S. Congress. For the latter part of the war, both the U.S. and the Confederacy recognized their own distinct Louisiana governors. Similarly, New Orleans and 13 named parishes of the state were exempted from the Emancipation Proclamation, which applied exclusively to states in rebellion against the Union.

== Politics and strategy in Louisiana ==
=== Secession ===
On January 8, 1861, Louisiana Governor Thomas Overton Moore ordered the Louisiana militia to occupy the U.S. arsenal at Baton Rouge and the U.S. forts guarding New Orleans, Fort Jackson and Fort St. Philip. A wealthy planter and slave holder, Moore acted aggressively to engineer the secession of Louisiana from the Union by a convention on January 23. Only five percent of the public were represented in the convention, and the state's military actions were ordered before secession had been established—in defiance of the state constitution, which called for a popular referendum to establish a convention. Moore attempted to justify these actions, saying: "I do not think it comports with the honor and self-respect of Louisiana as a slave-holding state to live under the government of a Black Republican president", using an epithet for Republicans used by many Democrats at the time.

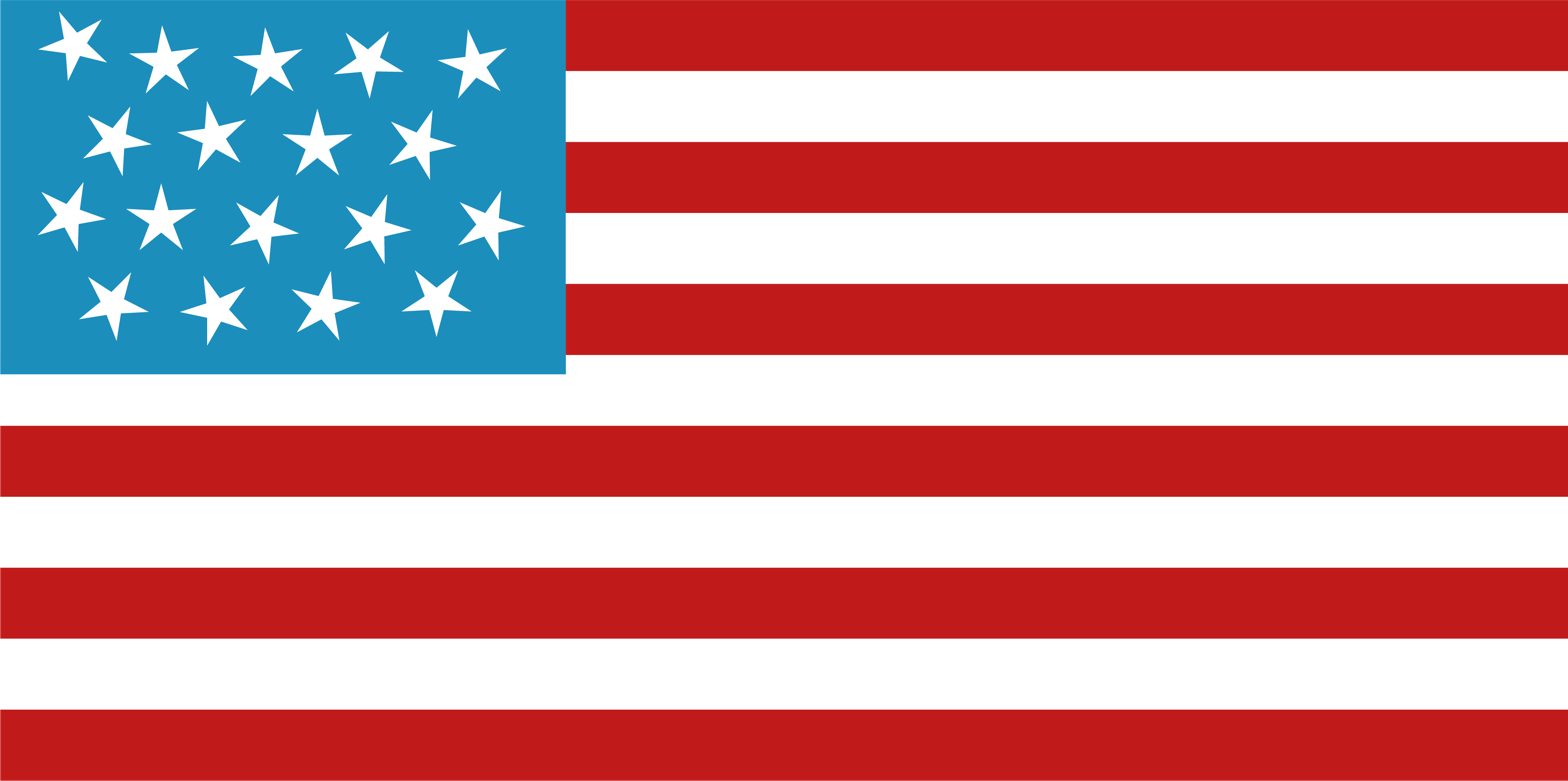
Digital remake of an early war 18 star secession flag that flew in the state

The strategies advanced to defend Louisiana and the other Gulf states of the Confederacy were first, the idea of King Cotton; that an unofficial embargo of cotton to Europe would force Britain to use its navy to intervene in protecting the new Confederacy. The second was a privateer fleet established by the issue of letters of marque and reprisal by President Jefferson Davis, which would sweep the sea clear of U.S. naval and commercial ships, and at the same time sustain Louisiana's booming port economy. The third was a reliance on the ring of pre-war masonry forts of the Third System of American coastal defense, combined with a fleet of revolutionary new ironclads, to safeguard the mouth of the Mississippi from the U.S. Navy. All of these strategies were failures.

In March 1861, George Williamson, the Louisianan state commissioner, addressed the Texan secession convention, where he called upon the slave states of the U.S. to declare secession from the Union in order to continue practicing slavery:

With the social balance wheel of slavery to regulate its machinery, we may fondly indulge the hope that our Southern government will be perpetual ... Louisiana looks to the formation of a Southern confederacy to preserve the blessings of African slavery ...

— George Williamson, speech to the Texan secession convention (March 1861).

One Louisianan artillery soldier gave his reasons for fighting for the Confederacy, stating that "I never want to see the day when a negro is put on an equality with a white person. There is too many free niggers ... now to suit me, let alone having four millions."

=== Union plans ===
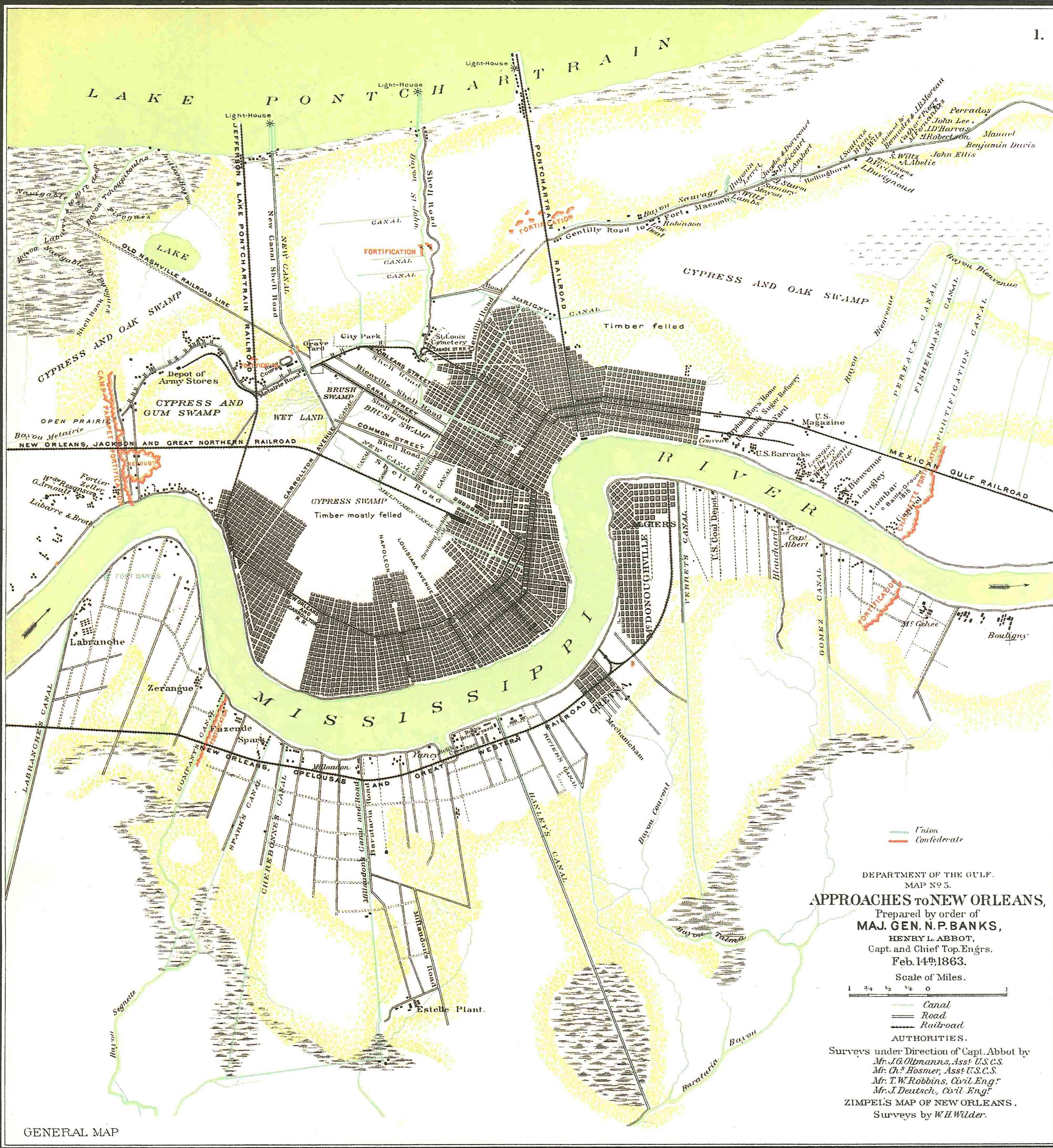
Approaches to New Orleans, Department of the Gulf Map No. 5, February 14, 1863.

The Union's response to Moore's leveraged secession was embodied in U.S. President Abraham Lincoln's realization that the Mississippi River was the "backbone of the Rebellion." If control of the river were accomplished, the largest city in the Confederacy would be taken back for the Union, and the Confederacy would be split in half. Lincoln moved rapidly to back Admiral David Dixon Porter's idea of a naval advance up the river to both capture New Orleans and maintain Lincoln's political support; by supplying cotton to northern textile manufacturers and renewing trade and exports from the port of New Orleans. The U.S. Navy would become both a formidable invasion force and a means of transporting Union forces, along the Mississippi River and its tributaries. This strategic vision would prove victorious in Louisiana.

== Notable Civil War leaders from Louisiana ==
A number of notable leaders were associated with Louisiana during the Civil War, including some of the Confederate army's senior ranking generals, as well as several men who led brigades and divisions. Antebellum Louisiana residents P.G.T. Beauregard, Braxton Bragg, and Richard Taylor all commanded significant independent armies during the war. Taylor's forces were among the last active Confederate armies in the field when the war closed. Union general William Tecumseh Sherman was president of the Louisiana Military Academy (now LSU) at the start of the war.

Henry Watkins Allen led a brigade during the middle of the war before becoming the Confederate Governor of Louisiana from 1864 to 1865. Randall L. Gibson, another competent brigade commander, became a postbellum U.S. Senator as a Democrat. Other brigadiers of note included Alfred Mouton (killed at the Battle of Mansfield), Harry T. Hays, Chatham Roberdeau Wheat (commander of the celebrated "Louisiana Tigers" of the Army of Northern Virginia), and Francis T. Nicholls (commander of the "Pelican Brigade" until he lost his left foot at Chancellorsville). St. John Lidell was a prominent brigade commander in the Army of Tennessee.

Henry Gray, a wealthy plantation owner from Bienville Parish, was a brigadier general under Richard Taylor before being elected to the Second Confederate Congress late in the war. Leroy A. Stafford was among a handful of Louisiana generals to be killed during the war. Albert Gallatin Blanchard was a rarity—a Confederate general born in Massachusetts.

Governor Thomas Overton Moore, came held office from 1860 through early 1864. When war erupted, he unsuccessfully lobbied the Confederate government in Richmond for a strong defense of New Orleans. Two days before the city surrendered in April 1862, Moore and the legislature abandoned Baton Rouge as the state capital, relocating to Opelousas in May. Thomas Moore organized military resistance at the state level, ordered the burning of cotton, cessation of trade with the Union forces, and heavily recruited troops for the state militia.

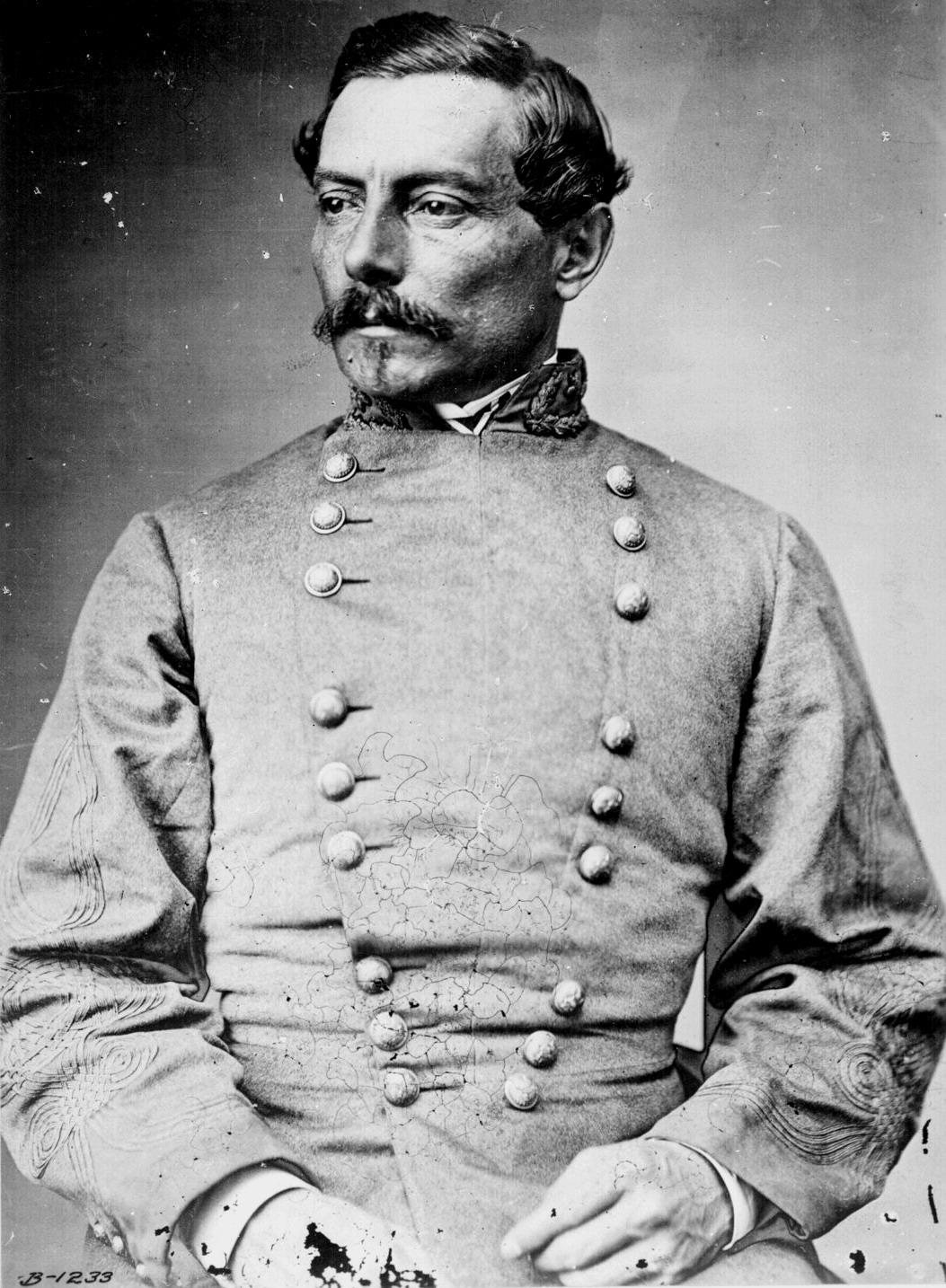
Gen.
P.G.T. Beauregard

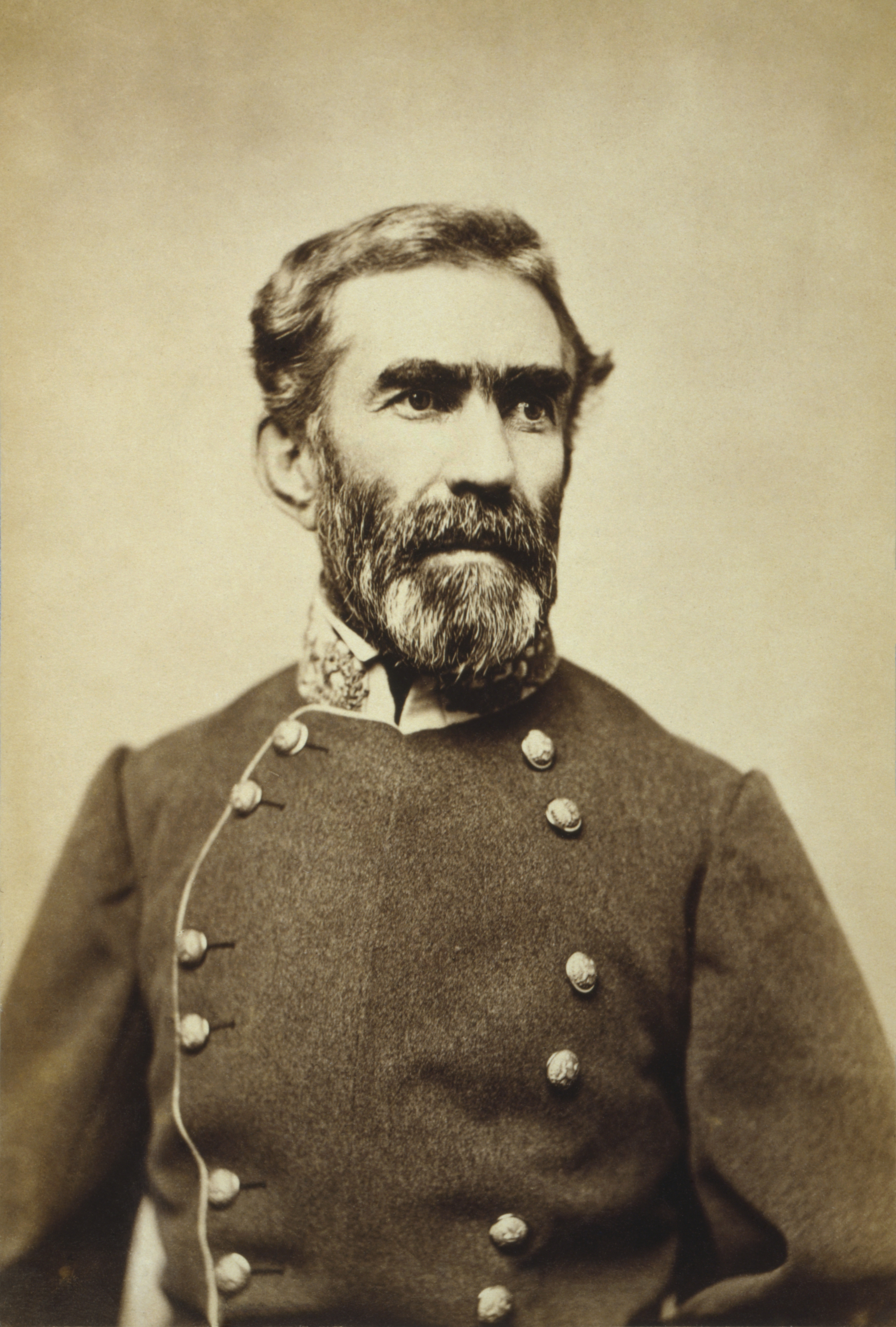
Gen.
Braxton Bragg

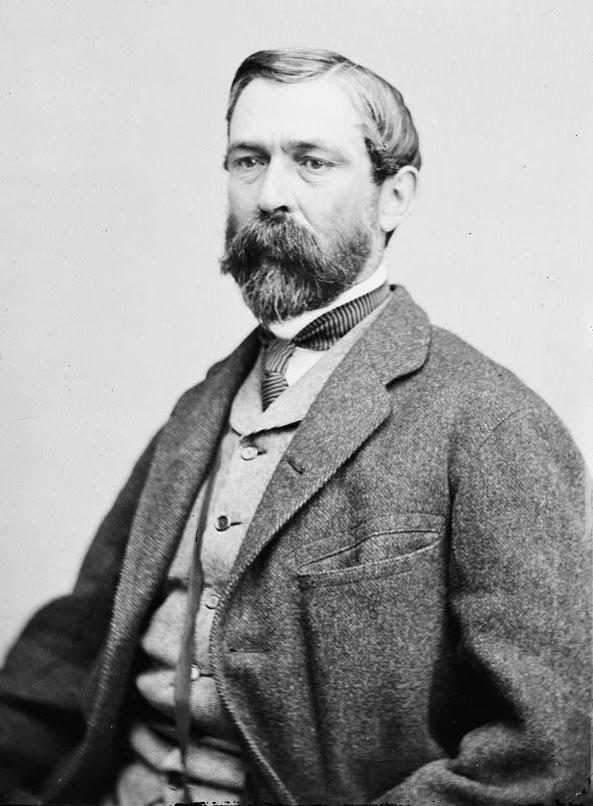
Lt. Gen.
Richard Taylor

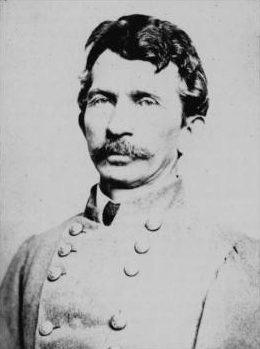
Brig. Gen. and Gov.
Henry W. Allen

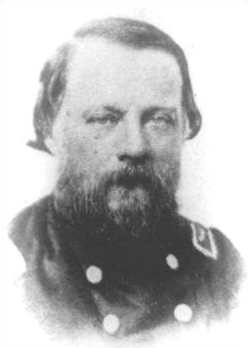
Brig. Gen.
Albert G. Blanchard

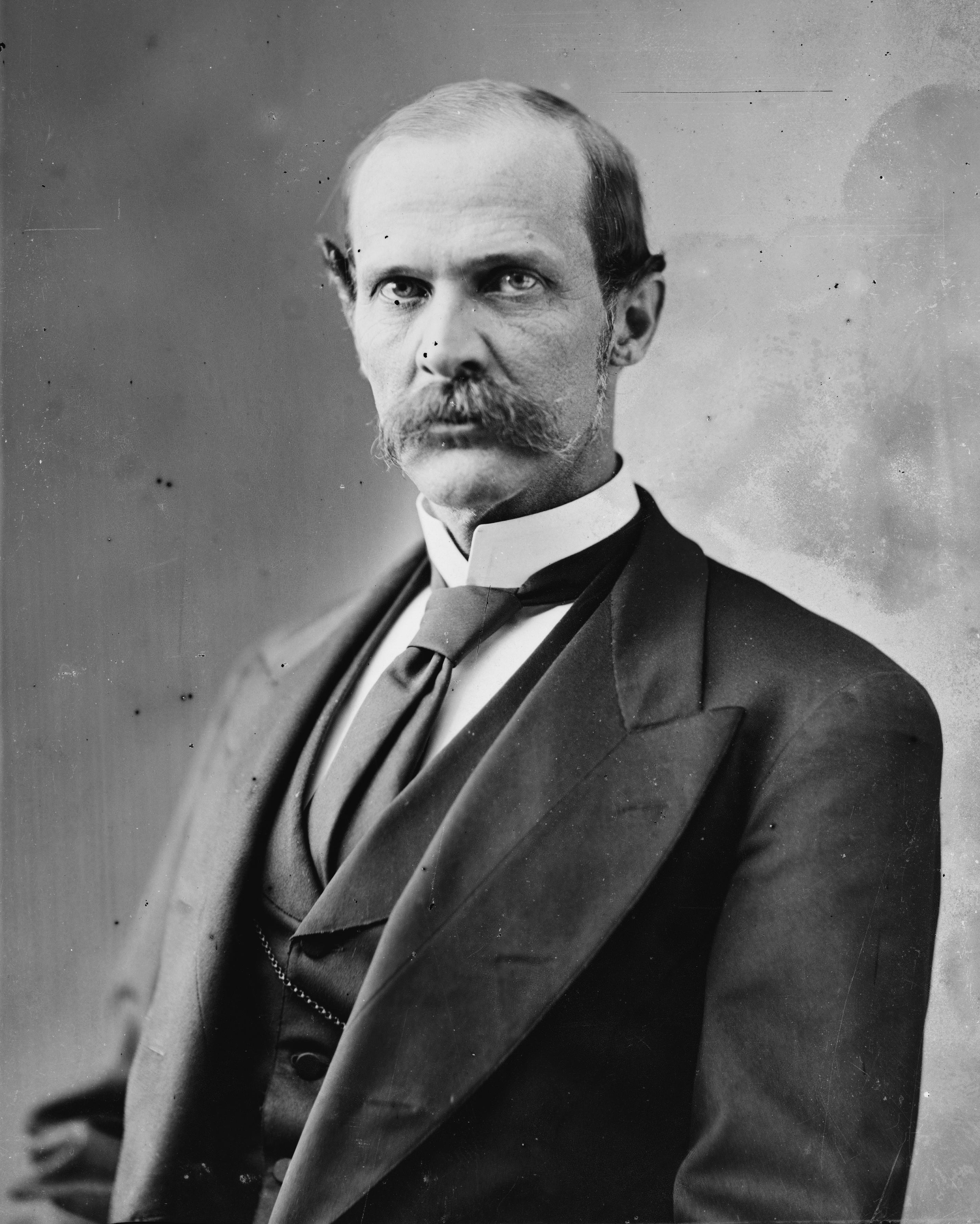
Brig. Gen.
Randall L. Gibson

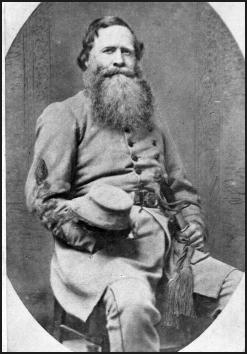
Brig. Gen.
Henry Gray

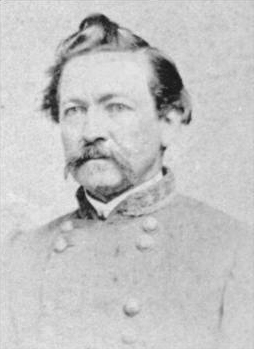
Brig. Gen.
Harry T. Hays

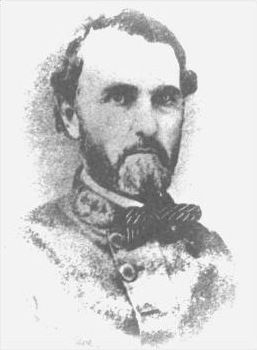
Brig. Gen.
St. John Liddell

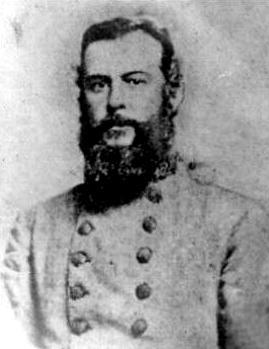
Brig. Gen.
Alfred Mouton

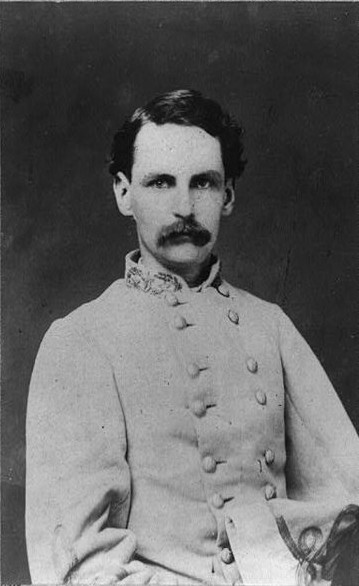
Brig. Gen.
Francis T. Nicholls

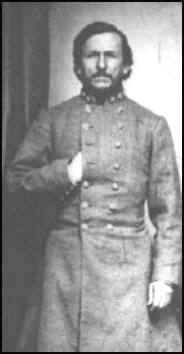
Brig. Gen.
Leroy A. Stafford

== Battles in Louisiana ==
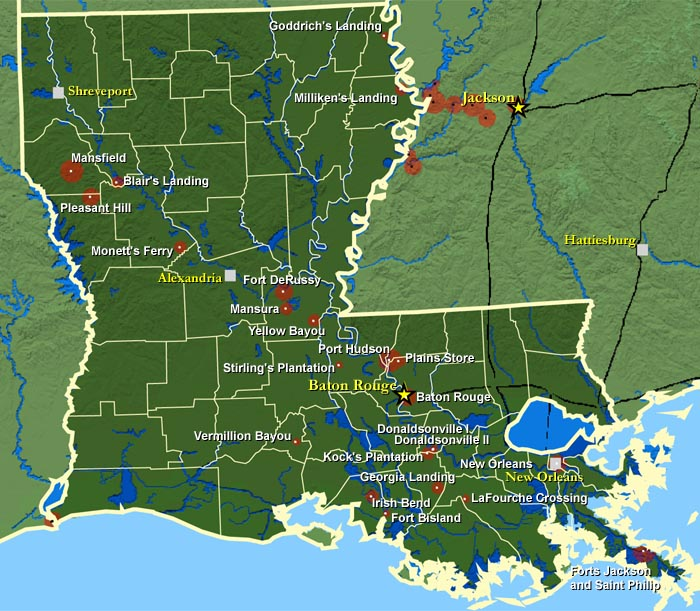
Battles in Louisiana during the American Civil War.

Battles in Louisiana tended to be concentrated along major waterways, as seen in the Red River Campaign.

Battle	Date
Battle of the Head of Passes	October 12, 1861
Battle of Forts Jackson and St. Philip	April 18, 1862
Capture of New Orleans	April 25, 1862
Battle of Baton Rouge	August 5, 1862
Battle of Donaldsonville I	August 9, 1862
Battle of Georgia Landing	October 27, 1862
Battle of Fort Bisland	April 12, 1863
Battle of Irish Bend	April 14, 1863
Battle of Vermilion Bayou	April 17, 1863
Battle of Plains Store	May 21, 1863
Siege of Port Hudson	May 22, 1863
Battle of Milliken's Bend	June 7, 1863
Battle of LaFourche Crossing	June 20, 1863
Battle of Donaldsonville II	June 28, 1863
Battle of Goodrich's Landing	June 29, 1863
Battle of Kock's Plantation	July 12, 1863
Battle of Stirling's Plantation	September 29, 1863
Battle of Bayou Bourbeux (aka Grand Coteau)	November 3, 1863
Battle of Fort DeRussy	March 14, 1864
Battle of Henderson's Hill	March 21, 1864
Battle of Mansfield (aka Sabine Cross-Roads)	April 8, 1864
Battle of Pleasant Hill	April 9, 1864
Battle of Blair's Landing	April 12, 1864
Battle of Monett's Ferry	April 23, 1864
Battle of Calcasieu Pass	May 6, 1864
Battle of Mansura	May 16, 1864
Battle of Yellow Bayou	May 16, 1864

== Restoration to Union ==
Following the end of the Civil War, Louisiana was part of the Fifth Military District.

After meeting the requirements of Reconstruction, including ratifying amendments to the US Constitution to abolish slavery and grant citizenship to former slaves, Louisiana's representatives were readmitted to Congress. The state was fully restored to the United States on July 9, 1868.

As part of the Compromise of 1877, under which Southern Democrats acknowledged Republican Rutherford B. Hayes as president, there was the understanding that the Republicans would meet certain demands. One affecting Louisiana was the removal of all U.S. military forces from the former Confederate states. At the time, U.S. troops remained in only Louisiana, South Carolina, and Florida, but the Compromise saw their complete withdrawal from the region.

== See also ==
- List of Louisiana Confederate Civil War units, a list of Confederate Civil War units from Louisiana.
- List of Louisiana Union Civil War units, a list of Union Civil War units from Louisiana.
- History of slavery in Louisiana

== Notes ==
Abbreviations used in these notes
Official atlas: Atlas to accompany the official records of the Union and Confederate armies.
ORA (Official records, armies): War of the Rebellion: a compilation of the official records of the Union and Confederate Armies.
ORN (Official records, navies): Official records of the Union and Confederate Navies in the War of the Rebellion.

Preceded by Georgia	List of C.S. states by date of admission to the Confederacy; Ratified Constitution on March 21, 1861 (3rd)	Succeeded by Texas
