= 1st Louisiana Cavalry Regiment (Union) =

1st Louisiana Regiment Cavalry
- Active: August, 1862 – December 18, 1865
- Country: United States of America
- Allegiance: USA
- Branch: Union Army, American Civil War
- Type: Cavalry
- Engagements: Fort Bisland; Irish Bend; Vermilion Bayou; Plains Store; Port Hudson; LaFourche Crossing; Sabine Crossroads; Pleasant Hill; Cane River Crossing; Mansura; Yellow Bayou; Spanish Fort; Fort Blakeley

Commanders
- Commander: Maj Harai Robinson

The 1st Louisiana Regiment Cavalry was a cavalry unit in the Union Army during the American Civil War. The regiment was one of several organized in New Orleans in August 1862 by order of Maj. Gen. Benjamin F. Butler and recruited from among "white Unionists, and pro-Northern refugees" in the city; it consisted primarily of foreigners and men of Northern birth.

== Service ==
The unit was assigned in 1863 to the Union XIX Corps of Maj. Gen. Nathaniel P. Banks in the Department of the Gulf.

They participated in operations in Western Louisiana: Fort Bisland, Irish Bend, and Vermilion Bayou in April, 1863 and in the Siege of Port Hudson from May to July. The regiment participated in the Red River Campaign from March to May, 1864.

The unit left Louisiana and moved to Fort Barrancas, Florida in February 1865. It joined the campaign against Mobile, Alabama. The regiment then marched to Blakeley, across the Mobile River, taking control of its Fort Blakeley, a major fort during the war. This completed Confederate defeat in the area.

The unit mustered out on December 18, 1865.

== 2nd Louisiana Regiment Cavalry ==
The 2nd Louisiana Regiment Cavalry was originally organized as the 3rd Louisiana Infantry in New Orleans on November 25, 1863. After serving at the defenses of Brashear City, Baton Rouge and Port Hudson, the unit was consolidated with 1st Louisiana Cavalry on September 7, 1864.

== See also ==
- List of Louisiana Union Civil War units
