= 1st U.S. Artillery, Battery F =

- Active: 1821–1901
- Country: United States
- Allegiance: Union
- Branch: Field Artillery Branch (United States)
- Engagements: Second Seminole War; Mexican-American War; Siege of Veracruz (1847); Battle of Cerro Gordo (1847); Battle of Contreras (1847); Battle of Churubusco (1847); Battle of Chapultepec (1847); American Civil War; Battle of Pensacola (1861); Battle of Fort Bisland (1863); Battle of Vermilion Bayou (1863); Siege of Port Hudson (1863); Red River campaign (1864); Battle of Mansura (1864)

1st U.S. Artillery, Battery F was a United States Army field artillery battery that was in service between 1821 and 1901, most notably in extensive service with the Union Army during the American Civil War. In that conflict, the battery was engaged at the battles of Pensacola, Fort Bisland, Vermilion Bayou, Port Hudson, and Mansura.

== Early service ==
=== Pre-1821 ===
The 1st Continental Artillery Regiment came into existence on 10 August 1779 during the American Revolutionary War. It was disbanded on 15 November 1783 and its lineage cannot be traced to any later artillery units. A new artillery organization was formed in 1794 and fought at the Battle of Fallen Timbers on 20 August 1794. A Corps of Artillery was raised for the War of 1812 and this lasted until a new reorganization in 1821.

=== 1821–1861 ===
On 2 March 1821, the artillery was reorganized and a new 1st Regiment was created. Company B, 4th Battalion, Corps of Artillery, which was created in 1812 and fought in the War of 1812, became Company F, 1st Artillery. The regiment fought in the Second Seminole War. During the Mexican-American War, Companies B, D, F, G, and H fought as an infantry battalion at the Siege of Veracruz and at the battles of Cerro Gordo, Contreras, Churubusco, and Chapultepec. Of the approximately 300 soldiers in the battalion, 45 became combat casualties.

== Organization ==
Stationed at Fort Duncan, Eagle Pass, Texas, January 1861. Garrison Fort Taylor, Fla., until May 1861. Moved to Fort Pickens, Fla., May 24, 1861, and duty there until May 1862. Attached to District Fort Pickens and Pensacola, Fla., Dept. of the South, to August 1862. Defenses New Orleans, La., Dept. Gulf, to January 1863. Artillery, 3rd Division, 19th Army Corps, Dept. Gulf, to March 1864. Artillery, Cavalry Division, Dept. Gulf, to June 1864. Defenses of Washington, D.C., 22nd Army Corps, to October 1865.

== Service ==
Bombardment of Forts McRae and Barrancas, Pensacola Harbor, Fla., November 22–23, 1861, and January 1, 1863. Capture of Forts McRae and Barrancas May 9. Moved to Pensacola, Fla., May 13, and duty there until August. Moved to New Orleans, La., August 30 – September 3, and duty in the defenses of that city until February 1863. Moved to Baton Rouge, La. Expedition to Port Hudson, La., March 7–27. Moved to Brashear City April 2–7. Operations in Western Louisiana April 9 – May 14. Teche Campaign April 11–20. Fort Bisland April 12–13. Jeannette April 14. Vermilion Bayou April 17. Expedition from St. Martinsville to Breux Bridge and Opelousas April 17–21. Expedition to Alexandria and Simsport May 5–16. Moved to Port Hudson, La., May 18–23. Siege of Port Hudson May 24 – July 9. Assaults on Port Hudson May 27 and June 14. Surrender of Port Hudson July 9. Moved to Baton Rouge July 13 – August 2. Sabine Pass Expedition September 4–12. Western Louisiana ("Teche") Campaign October 3 – November 17. At New Iberia until December. Moved to New Orleans and duty there until March 1864. Red River Campaign. Moved to Alexandria on Red River March 30 – April 3, and duty there until May 13. Retreat to Morganza May 13–22, with Lucas' Cavalry Brigade, Marksville May 15. Avoyelle's Prairie, Mansura, May 16. At Morganza until June. Expedition from Morganza to the Atchafalaya May 30 – June 5. Moved to New Orleans, thence to New York July 27 – August 3, and to Washington, D.C., August 5. Duty in the Defenses of that city until October 1865. Moved to Fort Trumball, Conn.
