= 5th Louisiana Field Battery =

- Active: 31 October 1862 – 2 June 1865
- Country: Confederate States of America
- Allegiance: Confederate States of America; Louisiana
- Branch: Confederate States Army
- Type: Artillery
- Size: Company
- Nicknames: Pelican Artillery, Faries' Battery
- Engagements: American Civil War; Battle of Fort Bisland (1863); Battle of Vermilion Bayou (1863); Battle of Kock's Plantation (1863); Battle of Mansura (1864); Battle of Yellow Bayou (1864)

Commanders
- Notable commanders: Thomas A. Faries; B. Felix Winchester

The 5th Louisiana Field Battery was an artillery unit recruited from volunteers in Louisiana that fought in the Confederate States Army during the American Civil War. The Pelican Artillery organized on 31 October 1862, recruiting men mostly from St. James Parish, Louisiana. The battery first saw action in November 1862 against Union gunboats on Bayou Teche. In April 1863, the unit distinguished itself at Fort Bisland and it fought a skirmish at Vermilion Bayou a few days later. In July 1863, the battery fired on Federal shipping at Gaudet's Plantation near Donaldsonville, Louisiana, and fought at Kock's Plantation. In April 1864, it served during the Red River campaign and was present, but not engaged at the battles of Mansfield and Pleasant Hill. In May 1864, the unit was engaged at Mansura and Yellow Bayou. The battery surrendered in early June 1865 while at Tyler, Texas. A total of 183 men enlisted in the battery during the war; 2 were killed in action, 5 died from disease, and 1 drowned.

== See also ==
- List of Louisiana Confederate Civil War units
- Louisiana in the Civil War
