= 1st Louisiana Regular Battery =

- Flag of Louisiana, 1861
- Active: 29 October 1861 – May 1865
- Country: Confederate States of America
- Allegiance: Confederate States of America; Louisiana
- Branch: Confederate States Army
- Type: Artillery
- Size: Company
- Engagements: American Civil War; Battle of Baton Rouge (1862); Battle of Georgia Landing (1862); Battle of Fort Bisland (1863); Battle of Vermilion Bayou (1863); Second Battle of Donaldsonville (1863); Battle of Mansura (1864); Battle of Yellow Bayou (1864)

Commanders
- Notable commanders: Edward Higgins; Oliver J. Semmes; James M. T. Barnes

The 1st Louisiana Regular Battery was an artillery unit recruited from volunteers in Louisiana that fought in the Confederate States Army during the American Civil War. The battery was accepted into Confederate service in October 1861. The battery fought at Baton Rouge in August 1862, then it transferred to the west bank of the Mississippi River and fought at Georgia Landing in October. In 1863, it fought at Fort Bisland and Vermilion Bayou. The battery was attached to Tom Green's Texas cavalry brigade for the remainder of the year and fought at Second Donaldsonville. In 1864, the battery did not come into action at Mansfield and Pleasant Hill, but it fought at Mansura and Yellow Bayou. The battery was at Tyler, Texas, at the end of the conflict.

== See also ==
- List of Louisiana Confederate Civil War units
- Louisiana in the Civil War
