= Army of Western Louisiana =

- Active: October 12, 1862–May 26, 1865
- Disbanded: Surrendered May 26, 1865
- Country: Confederate States
- Allegiance: Louisiana
- Branch: Confederate States Army
- Type: Field army
- Part of: Trans-Mississippi Department
- Engagements: American Civil War; Bayou Teche campaign; Battle of Fort Bisland; Battle of Irish Bend; Red River campaign; Battle of Mansfield; Battle of Pleasant Hill

Commanders
- Notable commanders: Richard Taylor; John G. Walker

The Army of Western Louisiana was a part of the Confederate States Army during the American Civil War. It fought in all the major engagements during Union Maj. Gen. Nathaniel P. Banks' campaign to capture Port Hudson, Louisiana. For much of its existence, it served under Maj. Gen. Richard Taylor. Perhaps its crowning achievement was its victory in April 1864 at the Battle of Mansfield.

On June 17, 1864, Maj. Gen. John G. Walker was ordered to relieve General Taylor of command of the Army of Western Louisiana, as Taylor had been promoted to lieutenant general and sent to the larger Army of Tennessee. In September and October 1864, the infantry of the Army of Western Louisiana campaigned in southern Arkansas. The army surrendered along with all the troops of the Trans-Mississippi Theater on May 26, 1865.

== Composition ==
District of West Louisiana - April 1863

Major General Richard Taylor

- Mouton's Brigade - Brig. Gen. Jean Jacques Alfred Alexander Mouton
  - 18th Louisiana Infantry Regiment - Colonel Armand
  - 28th Louisiana Infantry Regiment - Colonel Henry Gray
  - 24th Louisiana Infantry Regiment (Crescent Regiment) - Colonel Bosworth
  - 10th Louisiana Infantry Bataillon (Yellow Jacket Bataillon) - Lieutenant Colonel Fournet
  - 12th Louisiana Infantry Bataillon (Clack's Bataillon / Confederate Guard Response Bataillon)
  - Pelican Battery - Captain Faries
  - Cornay's Battery - Lieutenant Gordy
  - Semmes' Battery - Lieutenant Barnes
- Sibley's Brigade - Brig. Gen. Henry Hopkins Sibley
  - 4th Texas Cavalry Regiment - Colonel James Reily
  - 5th Texas Cavalry Regiment - Colonel Thomas Green
  - 7th Texas Cavalry Regiment - Colonel Arthur Bagby
  - 13th Texas Cavalry Bataillon (Waller's Bataillon)
  - Valverde Battery - Captain Sayer
- Unattached
  - 2nd Louisiana Cavalery Regiment - Colonel Vincent

Taylor's Army of Western Louisiana - March 1864
Maj. Gen. Richard Taylor

Mouton's Brigade
Brig. Gen. Alfred Mouton

18th Louisiana
28th Louisiana
Consolidated Crescent Regiment
Gross Tete (Louisiana) Flying Artillery
Valverde (Texas) Artillery

Polignac's Brigade
Brig. Gen. Camille Armand Jules Marie, Prince de Polignac

15th Texas
17th Texas Consolidated
22nd Texas Cavalry (dismounted)
31st Texas Cavalry (dismounted)
34th Texas Cavalry (dismounted)

Cavalry
Brig. Gen. Thomas Green

Lane's Brigade
Brig. Gen. Walter P. Lane

1st Texas Partisan Rangers
2nd Texas Partisan Rangers
2nd Regiment, Arizona Brigade
3rd Regiment, Arizona Brigade
Arizona Scouts (company)
McMahan's (Texas) Artillery

Bagby's Brigade
Brig. Gen. Arthur P. Bagby

4th Texas Cavalry
5th Texas Cavalry
7th Texas Cavalry
13th Texas Cavalry Battalion
McAnnelly's Scouts (company)
Moseley's (Texas) Artillery
