= Arthur Bagby =

Arthur Bagby may refer to:

- Arthur P. Bagby (1794–1858), lawyer, governor of Alabama, and United States senator from Alabama
- Arthur P. Bagby Jr. (1833–1921), lawyer, and Confederate general from Texas, son of the above
