= 18th Independent Battery New York Light Artillery =

18th Ind. Battery New York Light Artillery
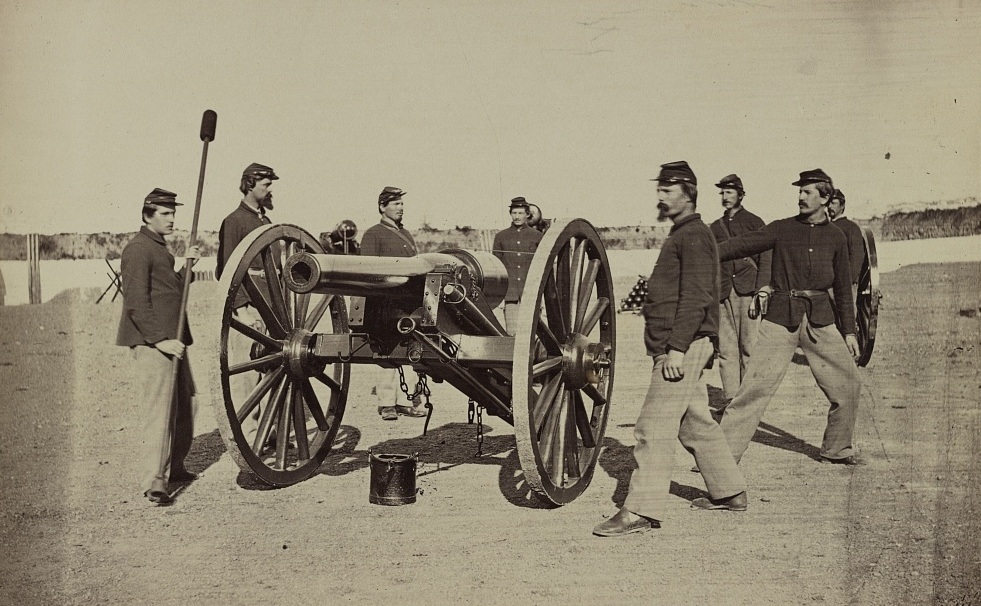
- The battery was armed with four 20-pounder Parrott rifles, as shown in the photograph.
- Active: September 13, 1862 – July 20, 1865
- Country: United States
- Allegiance: (United States) Union; New York
- Branch: Union Army
- Type: Field Artillery
- Size: Artillery Battery
- Nickname: Black Horse Artillery
- Equipment: 4 x 20-pounder Parrott rifles
- Engagements: American Civil War; Battle of Fort Bisland (1863); Battle of Vermilion Bayou (1863); Battle of Plains Store (1863); Siege of Port Hudson (1863); Battle of Spanish Fort (1865); Battle of Fort Blakeley (1865)

Commanders
- Notable commanders: Albert G. Mack

The 18th Independent Battery New York Light Artillery was an artillery battery that served in the Union Army during the American Civil War. The unit was organized in September 1862 and shipped to New Orleans. The battery fought at Fort Bisland, Vermilion Bayou, Plains Store, and Port Hudson in 1863. The battery served in garrison until 1865 when it fought at Spanish Fort and Fort Blakeley. It was mustered out of federal service in July 1865.

== Organization ==
Organized at Rochester, N.Y., and mustered on September 13, 1862. Left Rochester for New York City on November 18. Attached to Banks' New Orleans Expedition November–December 1862. Sherman's Division, Dept. of the Gulf, to January 1863. 2nd Division, 19th Army Corps, Dept. of the Gulf, to May 1863. 1st Division, 19th Army Corps, to August 1863. Reserve Artillery, 19th Army Corps, Defenses of New Orleans, La. to December 1863. District of Baton Rouge, La., Dept. of the Gulf, to February 1865. Siege Artillery, Canby's Forces, Military Division West Mississippi, to July 1865.

== Service ==
Sailed for New Orleans, La., December 2, 1862, arriving there December 13, and duty there until February 1863. Moved to Baton Rouge, La., February 3. Reconnaissance to Port Hudson, La., March 13–20. Operations in Western Louisiana April 9 – May 14. Teche Campaign April 11–20. Fort Bisland, near Centreville, April 12–13. Irish Bend April 14. Vermilion Bayou April 17. Opelousas April 20. Amite River May 3. Action at Plain's Store 21. Siege of Port Hudson May 24 – July 9. Assaults on Port Hudson May 27 and June 14. Surrender of Port Hudson July 9. Bayou LaFourche July 13. Duty in the Defenses of New Orleans and in the District of Baton Rouge until February 1865. Action at Comite Bridge May 3, 1864. Clinton and Liberty Creek November 15. Campaign against Mobile, Ala., and its defenses March 17 – April 12, 1865. Siege of Spanish Fort and Fort Blakely March 26 – April 8. Fort Blakely April 9. March to Montgomery April 13–25. Duty in District of Alabama until July. Mustered out July 20, 1865.

Battery lost during service 3 Enlisted men killed and mortally wounded and 23 Enlisted men by disease. Total 26.

== See also ==
- List of New York Civil War units
