= William E. Simonds =

American politician (1842–1903)

William Edgar Simonds
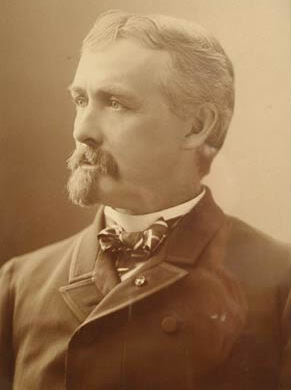
- William Edgar Simonds, Medal of Honor recipient
- Born: November 24, 1842; Collinsville, Connecticut, U.S.
- Died: March 14, 1903 (aged 60); Hartford, Connecticut, U.S.
- Burial place: Canton Center Cemetery; Canton, Connecticut, U.S.
- Military career
- Allegiance: United States; Union
- Branch: Union Army
- Service years: 1862–1863
- Rank: Second Lieutenant
- Conflicts: American Civil War * Battle of Irish Bend
- Awards: Medal of Honor
- Other work: Lawyer; Congressman

William Edgar Simonds (November 24, 1842 – March 14, 1903) was a United States representative from Connecticut and a recipient of the U.S. military's highest award, the Medal of Honor, for his actions as a soldier in the American Civil War.

== Early life and education ==
Born in Collinsville, a neighborhood of Canton, Connecticut, Simonds attended the public school and Collinsville High School. He graduated from Connecticut State Normal School at New Britain in 1860 and became a teacher.

== Military career ==
During the Civil War, Simonds enlisted August 18, 1862 as a private in Company A, 25th Connecticut Volunteer Infantry. He was promoted to sergeant major before being mustered into the service. On April 14, 1863 he participated in the Battle of Irish Bend, Louisiana. It was for his actions at Irish Bend that he would later be awarded the Medal of Honor. Ten days after the battle he became a commissioned officer with a promotion to second lieutenant and was reassigned to Company I of his regiment. He mustered out with his regiment in August 1863

== Political career ==
After his military service, Simonds attended Yale Law School and graduated in 1865. He was admitted to the bar and commenced the practice of law in Hartford, Connecticut. He served as a member of the Connecticut House of Representatives in 1883 and 1885, and served as Speaker in the latter year.

Simonds was elected as a Republican to the 51st United States Congress (March 4, 1889 – March 3, 1891). He was an unsuccessful candidate for reelection in 1890 to the 52nd Congress. He then served as United States Commissioner of Patents from 1891 to 1893.

Simonds served on the Connecticut Agricultural College's board of trustees and was a driving force behind the ouster of President Benjamin F. Koons in 1898 and the appointment of Simonds' friend and fellow Collinsville resident George Washington Flint as president.

On February 25, 1899, Simonds was issued the Medal of Honor for his action at the Battle of Irish Bend thirty-six years earlier.

After leaving politics, Simonds resumed the practice of law. He died in Hartford, Connecticut, on March 14, 1903, and was buried at Village Cemetery in his hometown of Canton, Connecticut.

== Medal of Honor citation ==
Rank and organization: Sergeant Major, 25th Connecticut Infantry. Place and date: At Irish Bend, La., April 14, 1863. Entered service at: Canton, Conn. Birth: ------. Date of issue: February 25, 1899.

Citation

Displayed great gallantry, under a heavy fire from the enemy, in calling in the skirmishers and assisting in forming the line of battle.

== See also ==
- List of Medal of Honor recipients
- List of American Civil War Medal of Honor recipients: Q–S

== Notes ==
U.S. House of Representatives
Preceded by Robert J. Vance	Member of the U.S. House of Representatives from Connecticut's 1st congressional district 1889-1891	Succeeded by Lewis Sperry
