= 25th Connecticut Infantry Regiment =

- Active: November 11, 1862, to August 26, 1863
- Country: United States
- Allegiance: Union
- Branch: Infantry
- Engagements: Bayou Teche Campaign; Battle of Irish Bend; Siege of Port Hudson

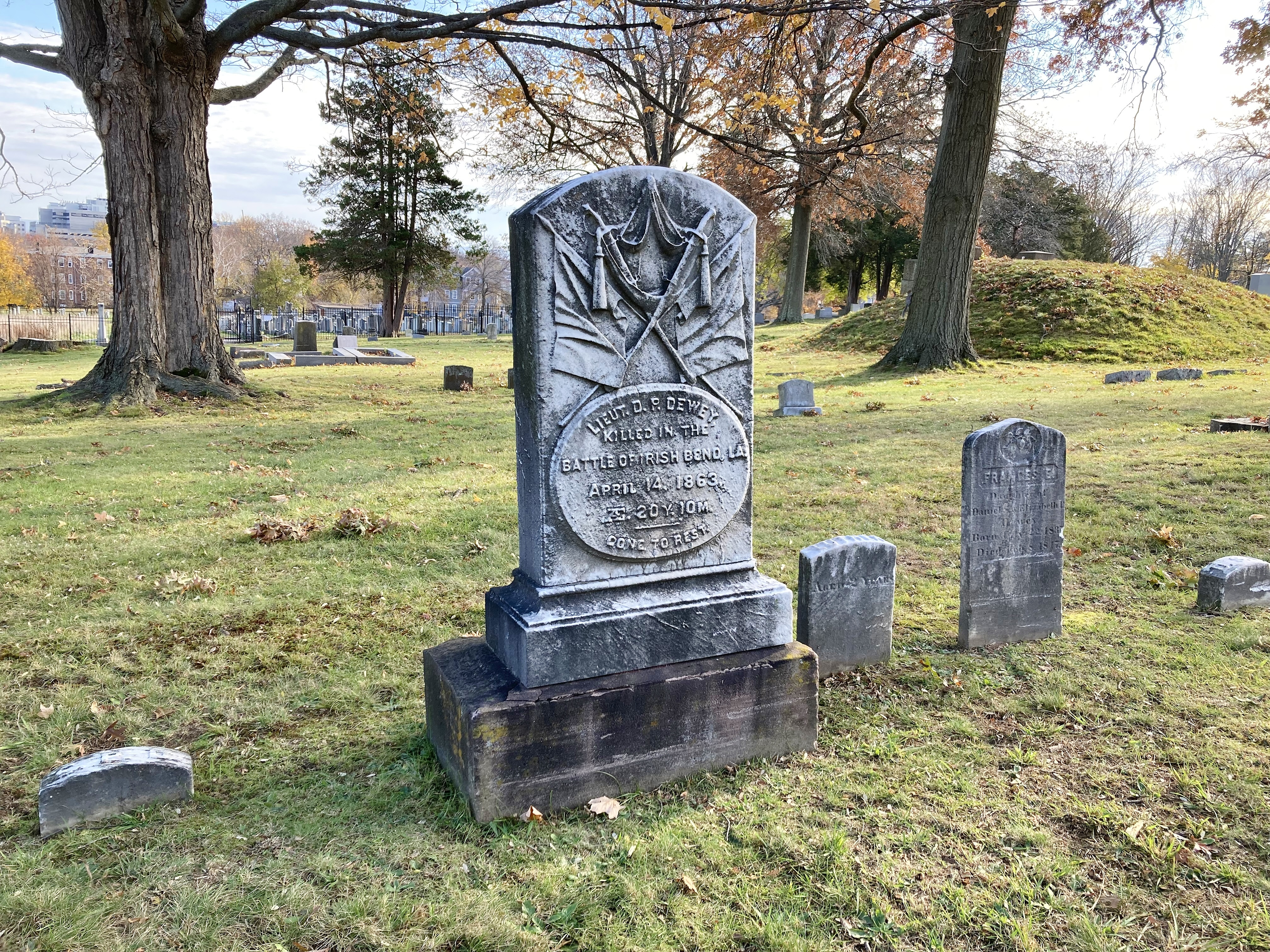
Gravestone of Lieut. Daniel Perkins Dewey, of the 25th Connecticut Infantry

The 25th Connecticut Infantry Regiment was an infantry regiment that served in the Union Army during the American Civil War for nine months service.

== Service ==
The 25th Connecticut Infantry Regiment was organized at Hartford, Connecticut, on November 11, 1862, under the command of Colonel George P. Bissell.

The regiment was attached to Grover's Division, Department of the Gulf, to January 1863. 3rd Brigade, 4th Division, XIX Corps, Department of the Gulf, to August 1863.

The 25th Connecticut Infantry mustered out of service August 26, 1863.

== Detailed service ==
Left Connecticut for eastern New York November 14, then sailed for New Orleans and Baton Rouge, La., November 29, arriving there December 17. Duty at Baton Rouge until March 1863. Operations against Port Hudson March 7–27. Moved to Donaldsonville March 28. Operations in western Louisiana April 9-May 14. Bayou Teche Campaign April 11–20. Porter's and McWilliams' Plantation at Indian Bend April 13. Irish Bend April 14. Bayou Vermilion April 17. Expedition to Alexandria and Simsport May 5–18. Moved to Bayou Sara, then to Port Hudson May 22–25. Siege of Port Hudson May 25-July 9. Assaults on Port Hudson May 27 and June 14. Surrender of Port Hudson July 9. Moved to Donaldsonville July 11. Duty in Plaquemine District until August.

== Casualties ==
The regiment lost a total of 94 men during service; 3 officers and 26 enlisted men killed or mortally wounded, 4 officers and 61 enlisted men died of disease.

== Commanders ==
- Colonel George P. Bissell
- Lieutenant Colonel Mason C. Weld - commanded during the siege of Port Hudson

== Notable members ==
- 2nd Lieutenant William Edgar Simonds, Company I - Medal of Honor recipient for action at the Battle of Irish Bend; U.S. Representative from Connecticut (1889-1891) [Simonds was sergeant major at the time of the battle and promoted 10 days later]

== See also ==
- Connecticut in the American Civil War
- List of Connecticut Civil War units
