= 114th New York Infantry Regiment =

- Active: July 21, 1862 - June 17, 1865
- Country: United States
- Allegiance: Union
- Branch: Infantry
- Engagements: Battle of Fort Bisland; Siege of Port Hudson; Red River Campaign; Battle of Sabine Cross Roads; Battle of Fort Stevens; Third Battle of Winchester; Battle of Fisher's Hill; Battle of Cedar Creek

The 114th New York Infantry Regiment was an infantry regiment in the Union Army during the American Civil War.

== Service ==
The 114th New York Infantry was organized at Norwich, New York beginning July 21, 1862 and mustered in September 3, 1862 for three years service under the command of Colonel Elisha B. Smith.

The regiment was attached to Emery's Brigade, Defenses of Baltimore, VIII Corps, Middle Department, to November 1862. Emery's Brigade, Louisiana Expedition, to December 1862. Sherman's Division, Department of the Gulf, to January 1863. 1st Brigade, 3rd Division, XIX Corps, Department of the Gulf, January 1863. 1st Brigade, 2nd Division, XIX Corps, to July 1863. 3rd Brigade, 1st Division, XIX Corps, to February 1864. 1st Brigade, 1st Division, XIX Corps, to July 1864. 1st Brigade, 1st Division, XIX Corps, Army of the Shenandoah, Middle Military Division, to March 1865. 1st Brigade, Dwight's 1st Provisional Division, Army of the Shenandoah, to April 1865. 1st Brigade, Dwight's Division, Department of Washington, to June 1865.

The 114th New York Infantry mustered out of service June 8, 1865 and was discharged June 17, 1865 at Elmira, New York. Recruits and veterans were transferred to the 90th New York Infantry.

== Detailed service ==
Moved to Baltimore, Md., September 6–9. Duty at Baltimore, Md., until November 6, 1862. Moved into Pennsylvania against Stuart, October 12–16. Moved to Fort Monroe, Va., November 6, then sailed for Ship Island, Miss., December 4, arriving at Carrollton December 26 and January 4, 1863. Moved to Algiers January 7, 1863, and served guard duty along the Opelousas and Great Western Railroad until February. Duty at Brashear City until March 20. At Bayou Boeuff and Pattersonville until April 2. Moved to Brashear City April 2, then to Berwick City April 9. Operations in western Louisiana April 9-May 14. Bayou Teche Campaign April 11–20. Fort Bisland April 12–13. Jeanerette April 14. Guard livestock to Brashear City April 20–28. At Newtown May 4. Opelousas May 9. Expedition from Berne's Landing to Brashear City May 21–26. Franklin May 25. Moved to Algiers May 29 and to Port Hudson May 30. Siege of Port Hudson May 31-July 9. Assault on Port Hudson June 14. Brashear City June 21. Surrender of Port Hudson July 9. Expedition to Donaldsonville July 10–30. Kock's Plantation July 13. Duty near Thibodeaux until August 19, and at Brashear City until September 2. Sabine Pass Expedition September 4–12. Moved to Algiers, then to Berwick September 17. Western Louisiana Campaign October 3-November 30. At New Iberia November 17, 1863 to January 8, 1864. Moved to Franklin January 8–10, and duty there until March 15. Red River Campaign March 15-May 22. Advance from Franklin to Alexandria April 15–26. Battle of Sabine Cross Roads April 8. Pleasant Hill April 9. Monett's Ferry or Cane River Crossing April 23. Construction of dam at Alexandria April 30-May 10. Retreat to Morganza May 13–22. Mansura May 16. At Morganza until July 1. Moved to Fort Monroe, Va., then to Washington, D.C., July 1–12. Repulse of Early's attack on Washington July 12–13, Snicker's Gap Expedition July 14–23. Sheridan's Shenandoah Valley Campaign August 7-November 28. Battle of Winchester September 19. Fisher's Hill September 22. Battle of Cedar Creek October 19. Duty near Middletown until November 9, and near Newtown until January 1, 1865. Near Stephenson's Depot until April 5. Moved to Washington, D.C., April 5, and duty there until May 23. Grand Review of the Armies May 23–24. Camp near Bladensburg May 28 to June 5.

== Casualties ==
The regiment lost a total of 315 men during service; 9 officers and 112 enlisted men killed or mortally wounded, 2 officers and 192 enlisted men died of disease.

== Commanders ==
- Colonel Elisha B. Smith - mortally wounded in action during the Siege of Port Hudson
- Colonel Samuel R. Per Lee
- Lieutenant Colonel Henry B. Morse - commanded at the Battle of Sabine Cross Roads

== See also ==
- List of New York Civil War regiments
- New York in the Civil War
