= Oliver John Semmes =

American judge; officer in the Confederate States Army (1839–1918)

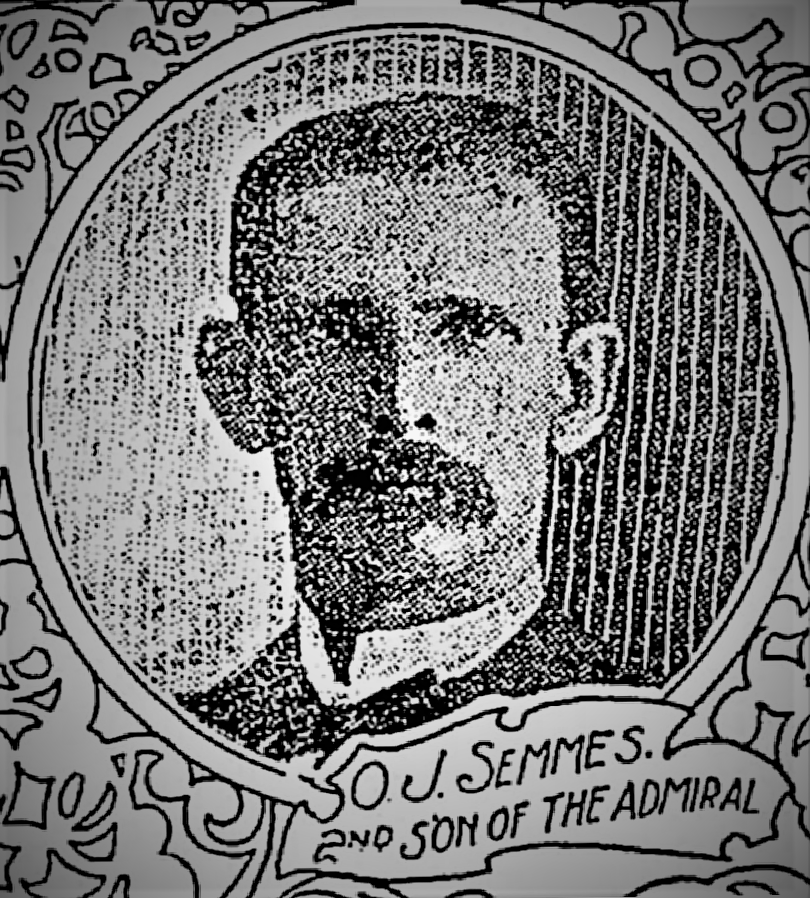
- Born: August 29, 1839; Portsmouth, Virginia, US
- Died: January 19, 1918 (aged 78); Mobile, Alabama, US
- Military career
- Allegiance: Confederate States
- Branch: Confederate States Army
- Rank: Major
- Commands: 1st Louisiana Regular Battery
- Battles: American Civil War; Red River campaign

Oliver John Semmes (August 29, 1839 – January 19, 1918), second son of Confederate States Navy Rear Admiral Raphael Semmes, was an officer in the Confederate States Army, serving throughout the American Civil War, notably in the Louisiana Red River campaign of 1864, and rising to the rank of major. After the war he became a judge.

== Sources ==
- Newman, Harry Wright (1956). The Maryland Semmes and Kindred Families: A Genealogical History of Marmaduke Semme(s), Gent., and His Descendants, Including the Allied Families of Greene, Simpson, Boarman, Matthews, Thompson, Middleton, and Neale. The Maryland Historical Society. Baltimore, MD: J. F. Hurst. pp. 92–93.
