= Battle of Irish Bend =

Battle of the American Civil War

Coordinates: 29.8116°N 91.4615°W

- Part of the American Civil War
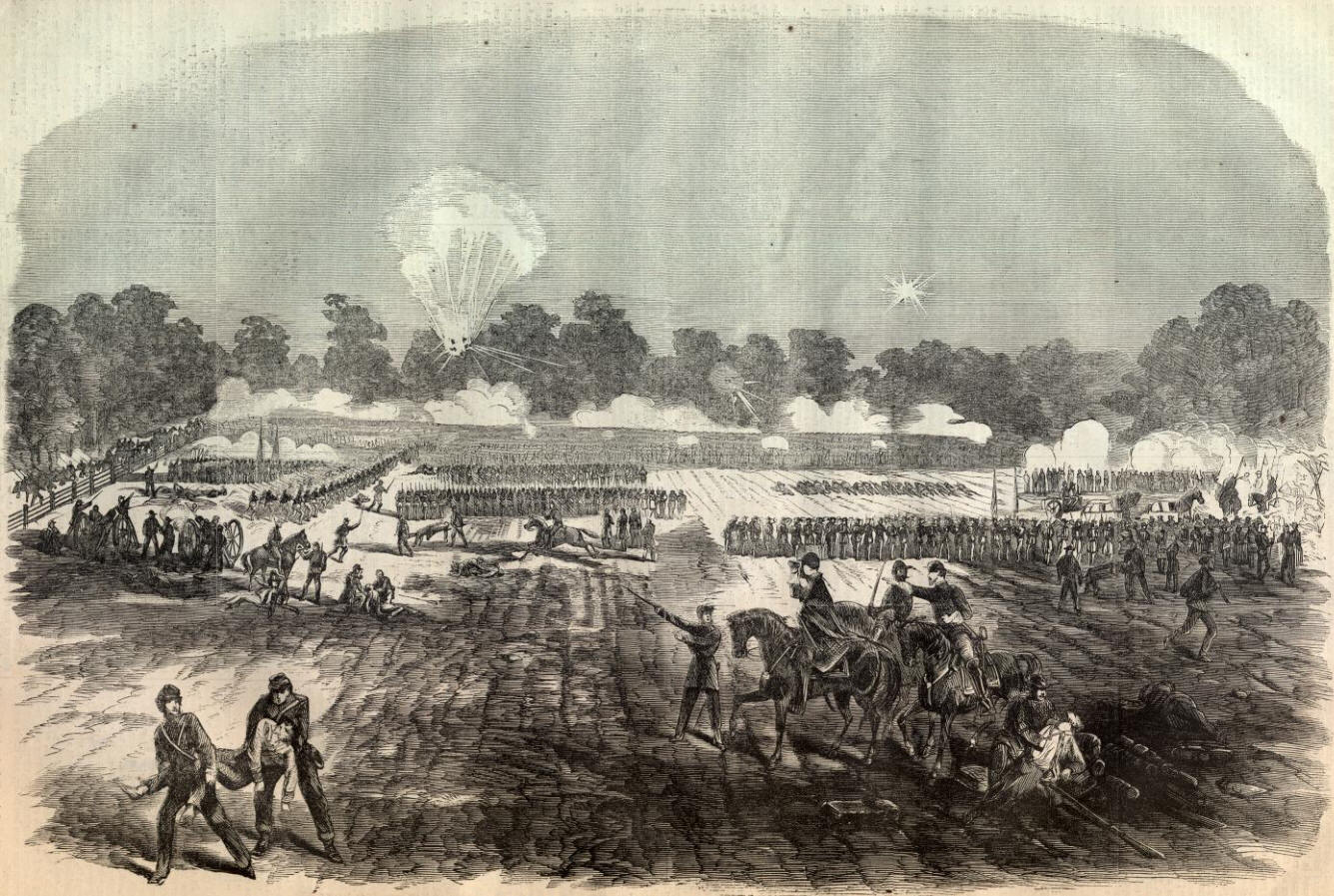
- Sketch of the battle for Harper’s Weekly
| Date | April 14, 1863 |
| Location | Irish Bend, St. Mary Parish, Louisiana |
| Result | Union victory |

Belligerents
| United States (Union) | (Confederate States of America) CSA (Confederacy) |

Commanders and leaders
| Nathaniel P. Banks; Cuvier Grover | Richard Taylor |

Units involved
| XIX Corps | Army of Western Louisiana |

Casualties and losses
| 353 | Unknown |

The Battle of Irish Bend, also known as Nerson's Woods or Franklin, took place during the American Civil War. It was fought between Union Major General Nathaniel Prentice Banks against Confederate Major General Richard Taylor during Banks's operations against the Bayou Teche region at Irish Bend near Franklin, the seat of St. Mary Parish in southern Louisiana.

== Prelude ==
While the other two Union XIX Corps divisions under Nathaniel Prentice Banks were comprising the expedition into west Louisiana crossed Berwick Bay towards Fort Bisland, Brigadier General Cuvier Grover's division went up the Atchafalaya River into Grand Lake, where they could either block a Confederate retreat, or force a retreat if the Confederates stayed and fought at Fort Bisland. The battle occurred two days after the Battle of Fort Bisland.

== Battle ==
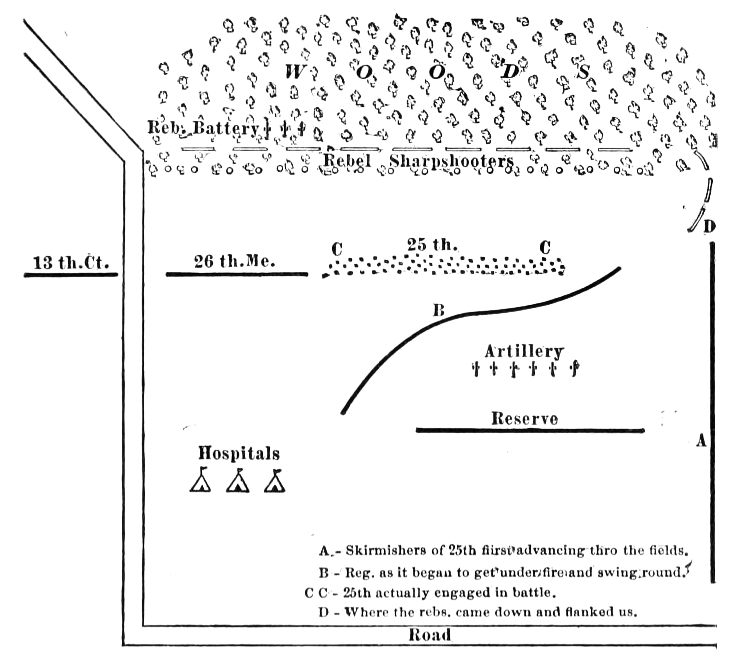
Map of the Battle of Irish Bend

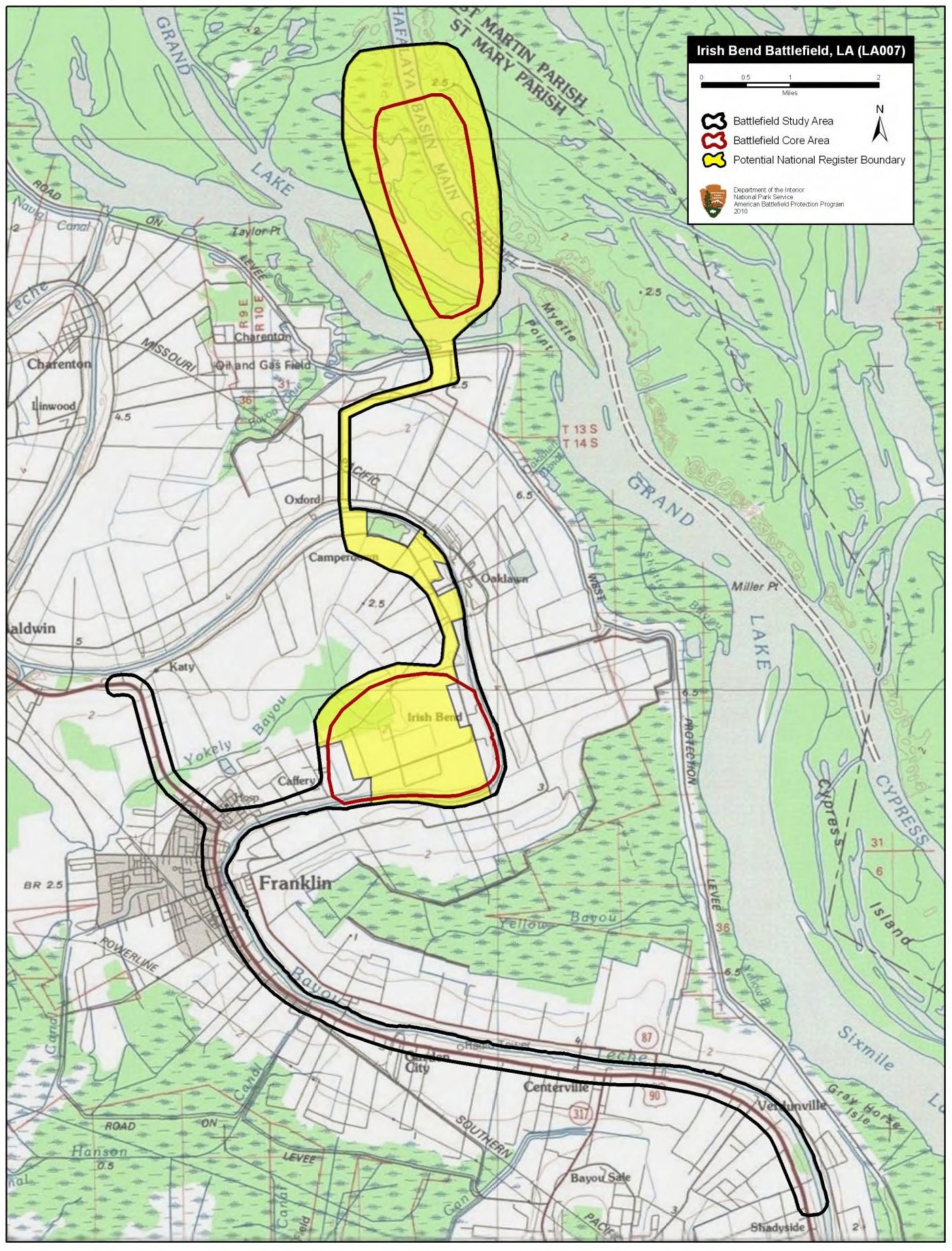
Map of Irish Bend Battlefield core and study areas by the American Battlefield Protection Program.

On the morning of April 13, 1863, Grover's division landed in the vicinity of Franklin and scattered Confederate troops attempting to stop them from disembarking. That night Grover ordered the division to cross Bayou Teche and prepare for an attack towards Franklin, Louisiana, at dawn. Meanwhile, however, Major General Richard Taylor reacted, feeling the obvious threat to his rear. He started withdrawing his forces from Fort Bisland, and his advance guard arrived quickly. On the morning of April 14, Taylor and his men were at Nerson's Woods, around a mile and a half above Franklin. As Grover's lead brigade marched out a few miles, it found Taylor's men on its right and skirmishing began. The fighting became intense; the Confederates attacked, forcing the Federal soldiers to fall back. The gunboat Diana arrived and anchored the Confederate right flank on the Teche. Still, Grover's men outnumbered the Confederates and when he paused to deploy his full force, Taylor withdrew rather than risk a pitched battle against superior numbers. Grover's men had taken the strategic position they sought. This victory, along with the one at Fort Bisland, two days earlier, assured the success of the expedition into west Louisiana.

== Opposing forces ==
=== Union ===
Army of the Gulf—Major General Nathaniel P. Banks

19th Corps — Major General Nathaniel P. Banks

- 4th Division—Brig. Gen. Cuvier Grover
  - 1st Brigade—Brig. Gen. William Dwight
    - 1st Louisiana Infantry Regiment
    - 22nd Maine Infantry Regiment
    - 6th New York Infantry Regiment (Wilson's Zouaves)
    - 91st New York Infantry Regiment
    - 131st New York Infantry Regiment (1st Regiment, Metropolitan Guard)
  - 2nd Brigade—Col. William K. Kimball
    - 24th Connecticut Infantry Regiment
    - 12th Maine Infantry Regiment
    - 41st Massachusetts Infantry Regiment
    - 52nd Massachusetts Infantry Regiment
  - 3rd Brigade—Col. Henry Birge
    - 13th Connecticut Infantry Regiment
    - 25th Connecticut Infantry Regiment
    - 26th Maine Infantry Regiment
    - 159th New York Infantry Regiment
- Divisional Artillery—Col. James W. McMillan
  - L Battery, 1st United States Artillery Regiment
  - C Battery, 2nd United States Artillery Regiment
  - 2nd Massachusetts Light Artillery Battery

=== Confederate ===
District of West Louisiana - Major General Richard Taylor

- Mouton's Brigade - Brig. Gen. Jean Jacques Alfred Alexander Mouton
  - 18th Louisiana Infantry Regiment - Colonel Leopold L. Armant
  - 28th Louisiana Infantry Regiment - Colonel Henry Gray
  - 24th Louisiana Infantry Regiment (Crescent Regiment) - Colonel Abel W. Bosworth
  - 10th Louisiana Infantry Battalion (Yellow Jacket Battalion) - Lt. Colonel Valsin A. Fournet
  - 12th Louisiana Infantry Battalion (Confederate Guard Response Battalion) - Lt. Colonel Franklin H. Clack
  - Pelican Battery - Captain Thomas A. Faries
  - Cornay's Battery - Lieutenant Minos T. Gordy
  - Semmes' Battery - Lieutenant James M. T. Barnes
- Sibley's Brigade - Brig. Gen. Henry Hopkins Sibley
  - 4th Texas Cavalry Regiment - Colonel James Reily
  - 5th Texas Cavalry Regiment - Colonel Thomas Green
  - 7th Texas Cavalry Regiment - Colonel Arthur P. Bagby Jr.
  - 13th Texas Cavalry Battalion (Waller's Battalion)
  - Val Verde Texas Battery - Captain Joseph D. Sayers
- Unattached
  - 2nd Louisiana Cavalry Regiment - Colonel William G. Vincent

== Sources ==
- Ayres, Thomas., Dark and Bloody Ground : The Battle of Mansfield and the Forgotten Civil War in Louisiana, Cooper Square Press, 2001.
- Banks, Raymond H. (2025). General Nathaniel Prentice Banks: The War Years (Irish Bend section). Orlando: R.H. Banks. p. 778. ISBN 979-8-218-83208-7.
- Parrish, T. Michael, Richard Taylor, Soldier Prince of Dixie, University of North Carolina Press, 1992.
- Taylor, Richard, Destruction and Reconstruction : Personal experiences of the late war, Time-Life Books, 1983.
- Winters, John D., The Civil War in Louisiana, Baton Rouge: Louisiana State University Press, 1963, ISBN 0-8071-0834-0
- National Park Service battle description
