= Irish Bend =

Coordinates: 29.8109°N 91.4545°W

The placename Irish Bend, in St. Mary Parish, Louisiana, refers a turn in Bayou Teche that was settled by a relatively high number of Irish-American planters, in what was otherwise Acadiana. Irish Bend was also known as American Bend; among the key settlers were John Murphy, the Cafferys (nephews of Andrew Jackson), and Alexander Porter. As told in the memoirs of a woman who moved there around 1811, "The Country being settled by French, Spaniards, & Indians principally, when we went there, very soon many from Kentucky, Tennessee, & Mississippi came & purchased. Having plenty made quite a favourable change on our Bayou. 3 or 4 Irish families living near us, Mr. Martin gave it the name of the Irish Bend which goes by that name today." Irish Bend has historically been a sugarcane-producing section of Louisiana. On April 14, 1863, it was the site of the Battle of Irish Bend, an engagement of the American Civil War.
