= 28th Louisiana Infantry Regiment =

Infantry regiment of the Confederate States Army

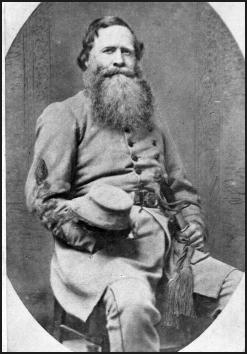
- Henry Gray was the regiment's first colonel. He was later promoted brigadier general.
- Active: May 1862 – May 1865
- Country: Confederate States of America
- Allegiance: Louisiana
- Branch: Confederate States Army
- Type: Infantry
- Size: Regiment (902 men, May 1862)
- Organized at: Camp Bisland, Louisiana
- Engagements: American Civil War: Battle of Irish Bend; Battle of Stirling's Plantation; Red River Campaign; Defense of Louisiana

Commanders
- Notable commanders: Col. Henry Gray; Col. Thomas W. Pool

The 28th Louisiana Infantry Regiment was an infantry regiment from Louisiana that served in the Confederate States Army during the American Civil War. It was also known as Gray's Regiment to differentiate it from the 28th (Thomas') Louisiana Infantry Regiment, which was also numbered as 29th. Raised in 1862, it served in the Trans-Mississippi Theater and along the Gulf Coast until it was disbanded in 1865.

== History ==
The 28th Louisiana was organized at Monroe during April or May 1862, under the command of Colonel Henry Gray. The regiment included ten companies and fielded 902 men when it mustered in. After completing its organization, the regiment moved to Vienna and drilled there for the next few months before being encamped near Milliken's Bend.

Sent to south Louisiana in November to join General Richard Taylor's command, the 28th encamped at Avery Island for a brief period before relocating to Fort Bisland. A detachment from the regiment participated in the 28 June 1863 capture of the Union gunboat Diana on the Atchafalaya River, and Company K was embarked on the gunboat when it reentered Confederate service. After fighting in the Battle of Fort Bisland between 12 and 13 April, the 28th Louisiana proved decisive in the Confederate victory at Irish Bend on 14 April. The regiment then retreated to Natchitoches with Taylor's army, returning to south Louisiana in June. Gray became commander of General Alfred Mouton's brigade during the summer and fall of 1863. With the brigade, the 28th Louisiana marched to Monroe in December and thence to Pineville for camp in January 1864.

When the Red River Campaign commenced in mid-March, the brigade crossed to Alexandria and retreated towards Natchitoches once again. Distinguishing itself in the attack at the Battle of Mansfield on 8 April, the regiment was in reserve with the brigade for most of the day on 9 April during the Battle of Pleasant Hill, being involved in desultory action. In the subsequent Battle of Yellow Bayou on 18 May, the regiment suffered many casualties. With the brigade, it marched to Monroe in August and moved into southern Arkansas. Late in 1864, the brigade returned to Alexandria through Minden. It camped on Bayou Cotile May 1865, when the regiment marched to Mansfield and disbanded there on 19 May, just before Taylor surrendered his command.

== Companies ==
- Company A (Bienville Stars) – Bienville Parish
- Company B (Marks Guards) – Bossier Parish
- Company C – Jackson Parish
- Company D (Claiborne Invincibles) – Claiborne Parish
- Company E – Winn Parish
- Company F (Jackson Volunteers) – Jackson Parish
- Company G – Winn Parish
- Company H – Bienville Parish
- Company I – Jackson Parish
- Company K – Winn Parish

== Commanders ==
- Col. Henry Gray (promoted to Brigadier General)
- Col. Thomas W. Pool

== See also ==
- List of Louisiana Confederate Civil War units
