= Battle of Fort Bisland =

Battle of the American Civil War

Coordinates: 29.7101°N 91.351°W

- Part of the American Civil War
Date	April 12, 1863 – April 13, 1863
Location	St. Mary Parish, Louisiana
Result	Union victory

Belligerents
United States (Union)	(Confederate States of America) CSA (Confederacy)

Commanders and leaders
Nathaniel P. Banks	Richard Taylor

Units involved
Department of the Gulf; XIX Corps	Army of Western Louisiana

Casualties and losses
234	450

The Battle of Fort Bisland was fought in the American Civil War between Union Major General Nathaniel P. Banks against Confederate Major General Richard Taylor during Banks' operations against the Bayou Teche region in southern Louisiana.

== Prelude ==
When Banks was made commander of the XIX Army Corps, Department of the Gulf, on December 16, 1862, he was ordered to coordinate an attack against the Confederate bastion of Port Hudson while General Ulysses S. Grant moved against Vicksburg. Banks made preparations for this campaign, but he knew the difficulties he would face on the march there. First, the area from New Orleans, was marshy, full of swamps, and disease would be rampant. There was also another obstacle in Bank's path — General Richard Taylor's small Army of Western Louisiana.

Banks formulated a plan that would take the XIX Corps to Alexandria, securing the Bayou Teche region that was laden with natural forage and unused supplies. He would establish supply depots along the way and then would move from Alexandria against Port Hudson. However, the quick movement he hoped for was slowed by Taylor's small army in a series of attacks, beginning with Fort Bisland, located in St. Mary Parish, Louisiana.

== Battle ==
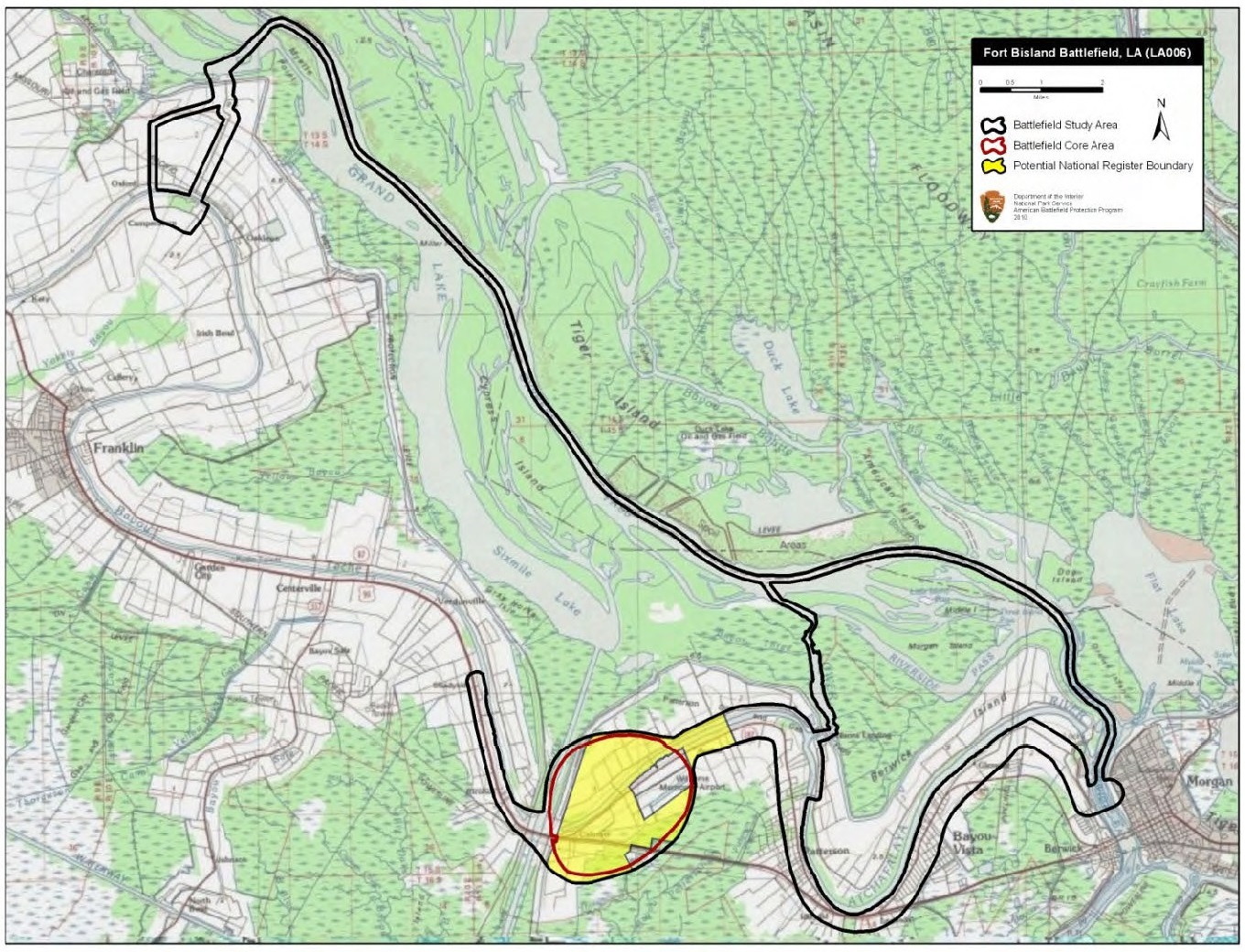
Map of Fort Bisland Battlefield core and study areas by the American Battlefield Protection Program.

When Banks departed New Orleans, he planned to capture Taylor's army in its entirety. On April 9, two divisions from the XIX Corps crossed Berwick Bay from Brashear City (present day Morgan City, Louisiana) to the west side at Berwick. On April 11, Banks began his advance in earnest. Taylor was well aware of Banks' advance because of successful scouting by his cavalry under Brig. Gen. Thomas Green. Green shadowed Banks' army and reported back to Taylor every detail of the maneuvers of the Union army.

On April 12, Banks sent a third division, under Brig. Gen. Cuvier Grover, up the Atchafalaya River to land in the rear of Franklin, intending to intercept a Confederate retreat from Fort Bisland or turn the enemy's position. General Taylor sent some of Green's cavalry to the front to ascertain the enemy's strength and slow his advance. He also sent troops under Brig. Gen. Alfred Mouton to impede the advance of Grover's division. Late in the day, Union troops of Brig. Gen. William H. Emory's division arrived and formed a battle line outside the Fort Bisland's defenses. An artillery barrage ensued from both sides until dark when the Federal troops fell back to camp for the night.

About 9:00 a.m. on April 13, Union forces again advanced on Fort Bisland. Banks had three brigades under in position south of the Bayou Teche. The brigades were deployed with Godfrey Weitzel on the left, Halbert E. Paine on the right (anchored on Bayou Teche) with Timothy Ingraham in support. Opposing the Union forces south of the Teche was the Texas cavalry brigade commanded by Brig. Gen. Henry Hopkins Sibley. North of Bayou Teche was the Union brigade of Oliver P. Gooding who faced off against Mouton's Confederate brigade.

Combat did not begin until after 11:00 a.m. and continued until dusk. In addition to Confederate forces in the earthworks, the gunboat Diana, which had been captured and was now in Confederate hands, shelled the Union troops. U.S. gunboats joined the fray in late afternoon.

By early evening, fire had halted. Later that night, Taylor learned that the Union division that went up the Atchafalaya and landed in his rear was now in a position to cut off a Confederate retreat. Taylor began evacuating supplies, men, and weapons, leaving a small force to slow any enemy movement. The next morning, Banks and his men found the fort abandoned.

== Aftermath ==
Fort Bisland was the only fortification that could have impeded this Union offensive, and it had fallen. Banks continued his march up Bayou Teche after this initial battle onward to his ultimate objective of Alexandria, Louisiana.

Taylor would slow Banks again a few days later at the Battle of Irish Bend.

== Opposing Forces ==
=== Union ===
Army of the Gulf – Major General Nathaniel P. Banks

19th Corps – Major General Nathaniel P. Banks

- 1st Division -
  - 2nd Brigade - BG Godfrey Weitzel
    - 12th Connecticut Infantry Regiment
    - 75th New York Infantry Regiment (2nd Auburn Regiment)
    - 114th New York Infantry Regiment (Albany County Regiment, Seymour Guard)
    - 160th New York Infantry Regiment
    - 8th Vermont Infantry Regiment
    - Attached to 2nd brigade :
      - Battery A, 1st United States Artillery Regiment
      - 6th Massachusetts Light Artillery Battery
      - A, B, C, and E Squadrons, 1st Louisiana Cavalry Regiment
- 3rd Division - BG William H. Emory
  - 1st Brigade - Col T. Ingraham
    - 4th Massachusetts Infantry Regiment
    - 16th New Hampshire Infantry Regiment (garrisoned at Brashear city)
    - 110th New York Infantry Regiment
    - 162nd New York Infantry Regiment
  - 2nd Brigade - Col Halbert E. Paine
    - 8th New Hampshire Infantry Regiment
    - 133rd New York Infantry Regiment (2nd Regiment, Metropolitan Guard)
    - 173rd New York Infantry Regiment (4th National Guard)
    - 4th Wisconsin Infantry Regiment
  - 3rd Brigade - Col Oliver Paul Gooding
    - 31st Massachusetts Infantry Regiment
    - 38th Massachusetts Infantry Regiment
    - 53rd Massachusetts Infantry Regiment
    - 156th New York Infantry Regiment (The Mountain Legion)
    - 175th New York Infantry Regiment
  - Divisional Artillery
    - 1st Maine Light Artillery Battery
    - Battery F, 1st United States Artillery Regiment
- 19th Corps Artillery - BG Richard Arnold
  - 1st Indiana Heavy Artillery Regiment
  - 18th Independent Battery New York Light Artillery

=== Confederate ===
District of West Louisiana - Major General Richard Taylor

- Mouton's Brigade - Brig. Gen. Jean Jacques Alfred Alexander Mouton
  - 18th Louisiana Infantry Regiment - Colonel Armand
  - 28th Louisiana Infantry Regiment - Colonel Henry Gray
  - 24th Louisiana Infantry Regiment (Crescent Regiment) - Colonel Bosworth
  - 10th Louisiana Infantry Bataillon (Yellow Jacket Bataillon) - Lieutenant Colonel Fournet
  - 12th Louisiana Infantry Bataillon (Clack's Bataillon / Confederate Guard Response Bataillon)
  - Pelican Battery - Captain Faries
  - Cornay's Battery - Lieutenant Gordy
  - Semmes' Battery - Lieutenant Barnes
- Sibley's Brigade - Brig. Gen. Henry Hopkins Sibley
  - 4th Texas Cavalry Regiment - Colonel James Reily
  - 5th Texas Cavalry Regiment - Colonel Thomas Green
  - 7th Texas Cavalry Regiment - Colonel Arthur Bagby
  - 13th Texas Cavalry Bataillon (Waller's Bataillon)
  - Val Verde Texas Battery - Captain Joseph D. Sayers
- Unattached
  - 2nd Louisiana Cavalry Regiment - Colonel Vincent

== Sources ==
- Ayres, Thomas, Dark and Bloody Ground : The Battle of Mansfield and the Forgotten Civil War in Louisiana, Cooper Square Press, 2001.
- Banks, Raymond H. (2025). General Nathaniel Prentice Banks: The War Years (Ft. Bisland section). Orlando: R.H. Banks. p. 778. ISBN 979-8-218-83208-7.
- Parrish, T. Michael, Richard Taylor, Soldier Prince of Dixie, University of North Carolina Press, 1992.
- Taylor, Richard, Destruction and Reconstruction : Personal experiences of the late war, Time-Life Books, 1983.
- Dyer, Frederick H. (1959). A Compendium of the War of the Rebellion. Vol. II: Chronological Record of the Campaigns, Battles, Engagements, Actions, Combats, Sieges, Skirmishes, etc., in the United States, 1861 to 1865. New York, United States of America: Thomas Yoseloff. LCCN 59-12963.
- Scott, Lieutenant Colonel Robert N. (1886). The War of the Rebellion: A Compilation of the Official Records of the Union and Confederate Armies. I. Vol. XV. Washington, District of Columbia, United States of America: Government Printing Office.
