= Battle of Vermilion Bayou =

Battle of the American Civil War

Coordinates: 30.1955°N 92.0143°W

- Part of the American Civil War
Date	April 17, 1863
Location	Lafayette Parish, Louisiana
Result	Union victory

Belligerents
United States (Union)	(Confederate States of America) CSA (Confederacy)

Commanders and leaders
Nathaniel P. Banks	Richard Taylor

Units involved
XIX Corps CONNECTICUT-- 13th, 24th and 25th Infantry. LOUISIANA-- 1st Cavalry (Co. "F"). MAINE-- 22d and 26th Infantry. MASSACHUSETTS-- 2d Battery Light Arty.; 52d Infantry. NEW YORK-- 6th, 91st, 131st and 156th Infantry. UNITED STATES--Battery "L" 1st Arty., Battery "C" 2d Arty.	Army of Western Louisiana

Casualties and losses
Unknown, 91st NY Infantry "2 enlisted men wounded"	Unknown

The Battle of Vermilion Bayou or Battle of Pinhook Bridge was fought on April 17, 1863, the third battle in a series of running battles between Union Major General Nathaniel Prentice Banks and Confederate Major General Richard Taylor. The battle was fought after both the Battle of Fort Bisland and the Battle of Irish Bend. On October 9, 1863 a skirmish with Confederate & Federal cavalry occurred at the same location.

== Prelude ==
After Nathaniel Prentice Banks had outmaneuvered Richard Taylor's Army of Western Louisiana out from the Bayou Teche region, he continued his movements towards his main objective of Alexandria, Louisiana. The Confederates were trying to slow him down as much as they could and they once again tried slowing him down right outside of Vermilion Bayou.

== Battle ==
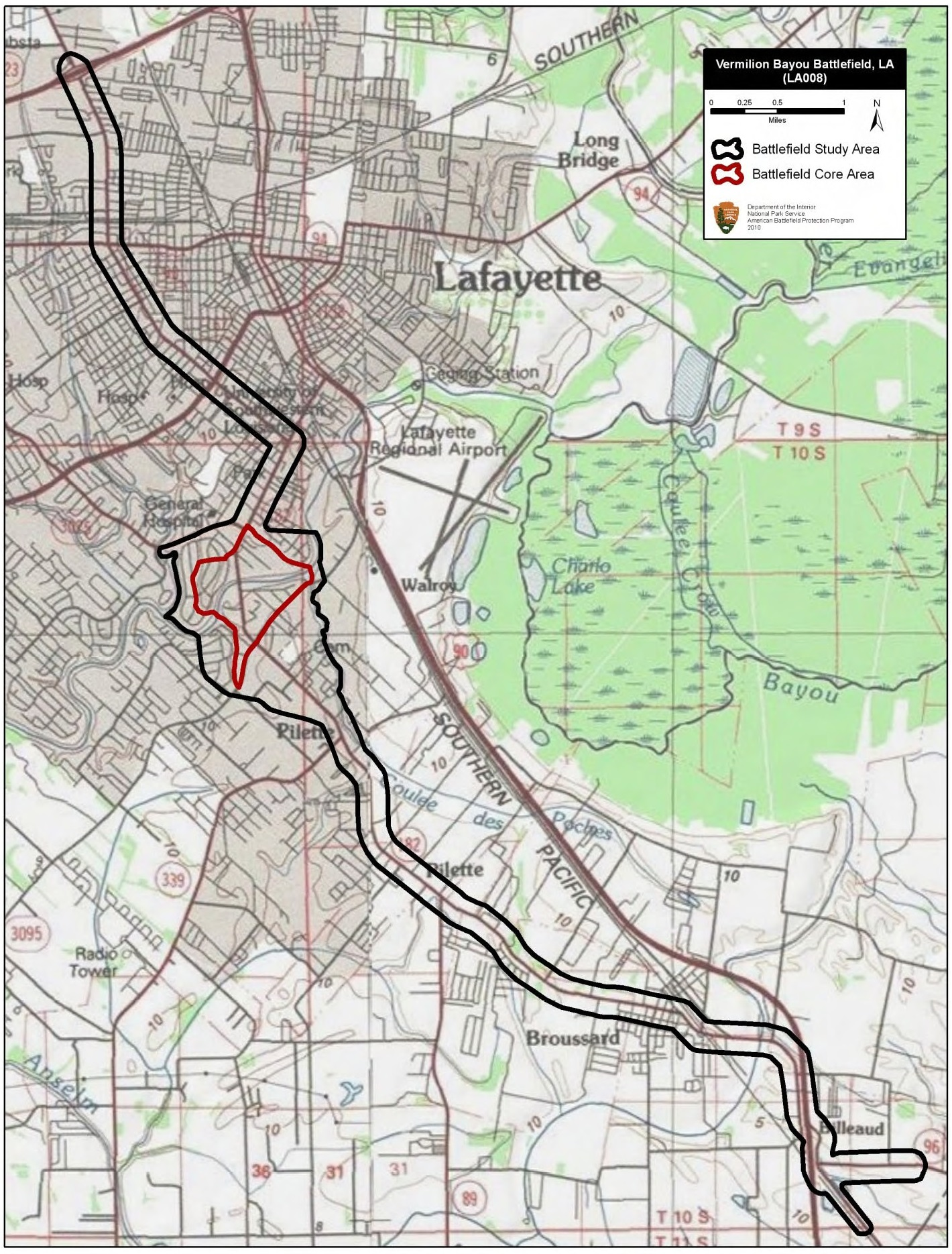
Map of Vermilion Bayou Battlefield core and study areas by the American Battlefield Protection Program.

As Richard Taylor's small army was withdrawing up the Teche, they crossed a bridge going over Vermilion Bayou. In order to slow Banks' army down, Taylor's men lit the bridge on fire and stopped for a rest. Banks, who was in pursuit of Taylor, split his army into two columns and sent one towards the bridge and the other column around the side.

As soon as the first column came within sight of the bridge, Confederate artillery began shelling the Union soldiers. After a while, Union artillery came up and a series of counter-battery exchanges ensued.

During the night, Taylor, knowing himself to be outnumbered, withdrew his force again.

== Aftermath ==
Though Taylor had not dealt Banks a defeat, he was continually slowing Banks down from reaching Alexandria, Louisiana, and his ultimate objective of Port Hudson, Louisiana.

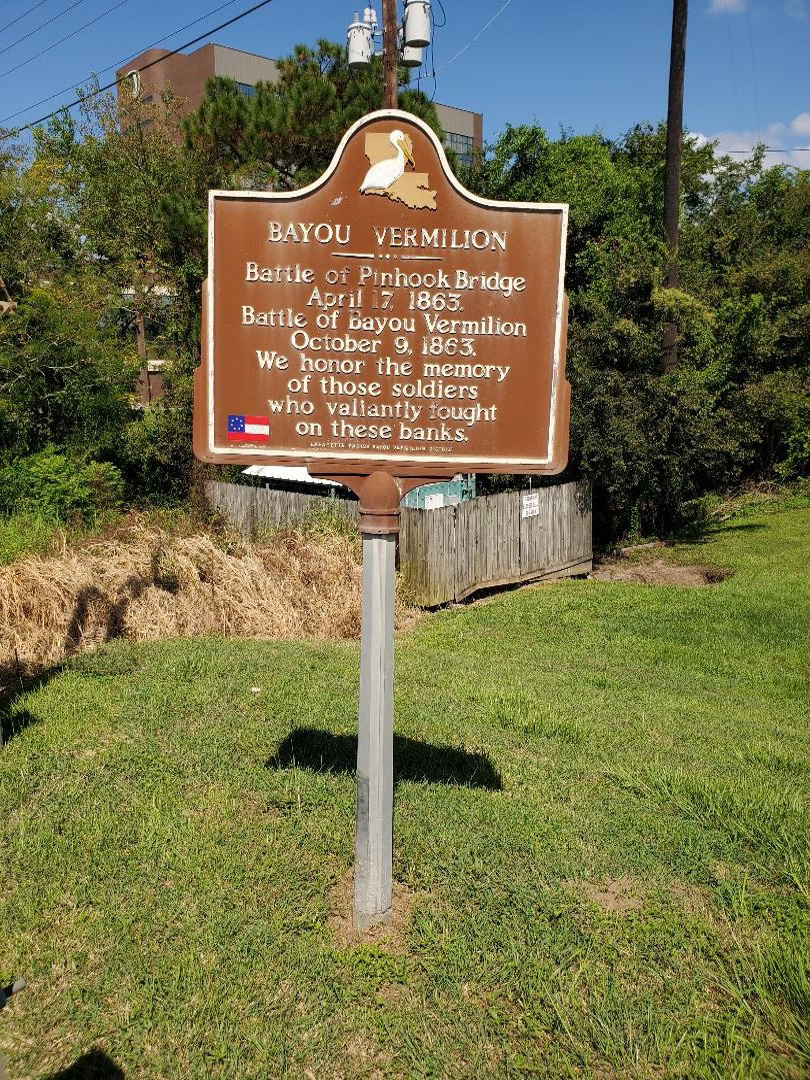
Louisiana historical marker located on eastern shore of Vermilion River adjacent to Pinhook Bridge in Lafayette, LA.
