= Arthur P. Bagby Jr. =

Confederate Army officer and lawyer (1833–1921)

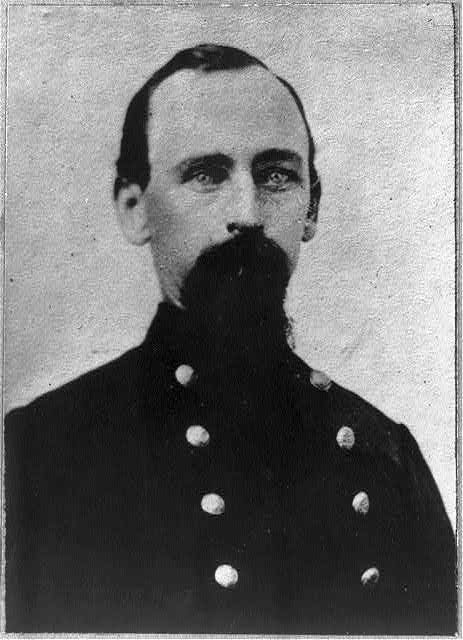
- Born: May 17, 1833; Claiborne, Alabama
- Died: February 21, 1921 (aged 87); Hallettsville, Texas
- Military career
- Allegiance: United States of America; Confederate States of America
- Branch: United States Army; Confederate States Army
- Service years: 1852–53 (USA), 1861–65 (CSA)
- Rank: Second Lieutenant (USA); Brigadier General (CSA)
- Conflicts: American Civil War: Battle of Galveston
- Other work: Lawyer

Arthur Pendleton Bagby Jr. (May 17, 1833 – February 21, 1921) was an American lawyer, editor, and Confederate States Army colonel during the American Civil War. Confederate General E. Kirby Smith, commander of the Trans-Mississippi Department assigned Bagby to duty as a brigadier general on April 13, 1864, to date from March 17, 1864, and as a major general on May 16, 1865. These extra-legal appointments were not made official by appointments of Bagby to general officer grade by Confederate President Jefferson Davis or by confirmation by the Confederate Senate.

== Early life ==
Bagby was born in Claiborne, Alabama, on May 17, 1833. He was a son of Alabama Governor Arthur P. Bagby and his second wife, Anne Connell. He attended school in Washington, D.C. He was appointed to the United States Military Academy at West Point, New York, in 1847. In 1852, at age 19, he was the youngest graduate to be commissioned a brevet second lieutenant of infantry in the 8th U.S. Infantry Regiment. He was stationed at Fort Columbus in 1852-53, and he saw frontier duty at Fort Chadbourne in 1853. Bagby resigned on September 30, 1853 to study law and was admitted to the bar in Alabama in 1855. He practiced in Mobile, Alabama, until 1858, when he moved to Gonzales, Texas where he practiced law until after the start of the Civil War. There, he married Frances Taylor in June 1860.

== Civil War ==
On October 12, 1861, Bagby joined the Confederate Army, serving as a major in the 7th Regiment of Texas Mounted Volunteers Bagby served in Brigadier General Henry Hopkins Sibley's Army of New Mexico during the New Mexico Campaign from February to April 1862. While Sibley's main force moved on to the Battle of Valverde and Battle of Glorieta Pass, Bagby's men served on garrison duty in southern New Mexico towns. Bagby was promoted to lieutenant colonel on April 4, 1862. After Sibley's retreat to Texas, Bagby was accused of drunkenness. He tendered his resignation after this accusation was made but the Confederate War Department refused the resignation and cleared him through a court-martial which was set up for that purpose.

Bagby was promoted to colonel on November 15, 1862. In the Second Battle of Galveston, on January 1, 1863, Bagby led his "Horse Marines" aboard an improvised gunboat in the capture of the USS Harriet Lane.

The 7th Texas Cavalry Regiment fought dismounted at the Battle of Fort Bisland or Battle of Berwick Bay on April 13, 1863. Bagby was wounded in the arm during the battle but would not leave the field until a Union Army attack was driven back. When Brigadier General Thomas Green was promoted to division command, Bagby was placed in command of a brigade. He led the brigade at the Battle of Stirling's Plantation (Battle of Fordoche Bridge), Battle of Bayou Bourbeux and the Battle of Mansfield during the Red River Campaign. Bagby's cavalry then harassed the retreat of the Union Army under Major General Nathaniel P. Banks from Mansfield to Simmesport, Louisiana.

General E. Kirby Smith previously recommended Bagby for promotion. In the absence of action on his request, and despite his lack of formal authority to make promotions, Smith assigned Bagby to duty as a brigadier general on April 13, 1864, to rank from March 17, 1864.

Bagby's cavalry brigade was renowned as one of the best in the Trans-Mississippi Department. Bagby commanded a brigade under Brigadier General Hamilton P. Bee for a time before replacing Bee in command in mid-May 1864. In September 1864, Bagby was given command of a new brigade of three Texas cavalry regiments in the 2nd Cavalry Division. In early 1865, Smith assigned Bagby to permanent command of a cavalry division.

On May 16, 1865, after Robert E. Lee and Joseph E. Johnston had surrendered their armies, the Confederate Senate had held their last meeting and Jefferson Davis had been captured by Union troops, General E. Kirby Smith assigned Bagby to duty as a major general. Smith had no authority to promote officers to general grades and the Confederate President and Senate were no longer able to appoint or confirm general officers in May 1865.

== Aftermath and death ==
After the war, Bagby settled in Victoria, Texas, resumed practicing law, and was in 1870–1871 assistant editor of the local newspaper, the Victoria Advocate. He later moved to Hallettsville, Texas, where he continued his law practice and became a prominent member of the state bar. He had two children, William Taylor Bagby and A. P. Bagby.

Arthur Pendleton Bagby Jr. was the last surviving member of his West Point class. He died in Hallettsville, Texas, on February 21, 1921. He is buried in Hallettsville City Cemetery.

== See also ==
- List of American Civil War Generals (Acting Confederate)
