= Henry Gray (politician) =

American politician (1816–1892)

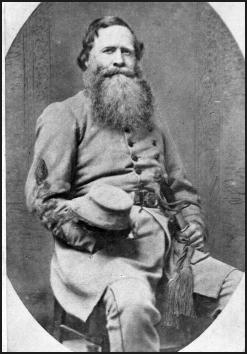
- Born: January 19, 1816; Laurens County, South Carolina
- Died: December 16, 1892 (aged 76); Coushatta, Louisiana
- Burial place: Springville Cemetery, Coushatta, Louisiana
- Military career
- Allegiance: United States of America; Confederate States of America
- Branch: Confederate States Army
- Service years: 1861–65
- Rank: Brigadier General
- Unit: Army of Western Louisiana
- Commands: 28th Louisiana Infantry Regiment; Gray's Brigade
- Conflicts: American Civil War
- Other work: Confederate Congressman, state legislator, attorney, plantation owner

Henry Gray, Jr. (January 19, 1816 – December 11, 1892) was an American lawyer and politician who served in the state legislatures of Mississippi and then Louisiana. During the American Civil War, he was a general in the Confederate Army and subsequently served in the Confederate States Congress.

== Early life and career ==
Gray was born to a military family in the Laurens District of South Carolina. He was a son of Henry Gray (a captain in the United States Army during the War of 1812) and Elvira Flanagan Gray. His grandfather Fredrick Gray had been a captain in the American Revolutionary War.

He graduated from South Carolina College in 1834, and was admitted to the bar in 1838. He then settled in Winston County, Mississippi, where he married Eleanora Ann Howard in 1841, and was the local district attorney from 1839 until 1845. In 1846 Gray was elected to the Mississippi Legislature and served one term. In 1850 he ran unsuccessfully for the U.S. Congress as a Whig.

In December 1850, he bought 332 acres (1.34 km^{2}) of land in Bienville Parish, Louisiana, in the community of Brushy Valley. In the campaign of 1856 he was an elector for the Democratic ticket and canvassed the state with his friend Judah P. Benjamin. He was elected to the State Legislature in 1860 and later that year lost a close race for senator to Benjamin.

== Civil War ==
At the beginning of the Civil War, Gray enlisted as a private in a Mississippi infantry regiment in January 1861, until his friend Jefferson Davis called him to go back to Louisiana to raise a regiment. In April and early May 1862, Gray organized the 28th Louisiana Infantry Regiment at Camp Taylor and was elected as its colonel. He and his men were mustered into the Confederate Army on May 2.

On April 14, 1863, Gray was wounded in the fighting near Bayou Teche, Louisiana. Department commander Edmund Kirby Smith ordered his promotion to brigadier general on April 8, however the Confederate Congress disallowed it. Gray was given brigade command in Polignac's Division in April.

Gray saw action around Vicksburg and in various battles within Louisiana while leading his brigade. He assumed the command of a division during the Battle of Mansfield on April 8, 1864, following the mortal wounding of Alfred Mouton.

Gray was elected to represent his northwestern Louisiana congressional district to the Second Confederate Congress, a position he had not sought nor had any knowledge of until notified of his election. He subsequently left the army in camp at Camden, Arkansas, and traveled to Richmond, Virginia. He was promoted to brigadier general on March 17, 1865, backdated to the Mansfield fight, and Gray rejoined his brigade in Polignac's Division until the end of the war. There is no record of his being paroled from the U.S. Government.

== Postbellum activities ==
After the war he was a member of Louisiana State Senate. He spent most of the rest of his life trying to re-establish his finances. His only son had died in 1864, and his wife died a few years later. At the age of 76, Gray died at his daughter's house near Coushatta, Louisiana, and was buried nearby in Springville Cemetery.

The Brig. Gen. Henry Gray Chapter #218 of the Military Order of the Stars and Bars in Shreveport, Louisiana, is named in his honor.

== See also ==
- List of American Civil War generals (Confederate)
