= Battle of Mansura =

1864 battle of the American Civil War

- Part of the American Civil War
Date	May 16, 1864
Location	Mansura, Louisiana 31°3′18″N 92°2′52″W
Result	Union victory

Belligerents
United States (Union)	Confederate States

Commanders and leaders
(United States) Nathaniel P. Banks	(Confederate States of America) Richard Taylor

Units involved
Army of the Gulf	District of West Louisiana

Casualties and losses
Unknown	Unknown

The Battle of Mansura was fought near Mansura, Louisiana, on May 16, 1864, during the Red River Campaign of the American Civil War. A Union force defeated elements of the Confederate States Army.

== Background ==
As Maj. Gen. Nathaniel P. Banks's Red River Expeditionary Force (from the Department of the Gulf) retreated down the Red River, Confederate forces under Maj. Gen. Richard Taylor attempted to slow the Union troops’ movements and, if possible, deplete their numbers or, better yet, destroy them. The Union forces passed Fort DeRussy, reached Marksville, and then continued east. At Mansura, Taylor massed his forces in an open prairie that controlled access to the three roads traversing the area, where he hoped his artillery could cause many casualties.

== Battle ==
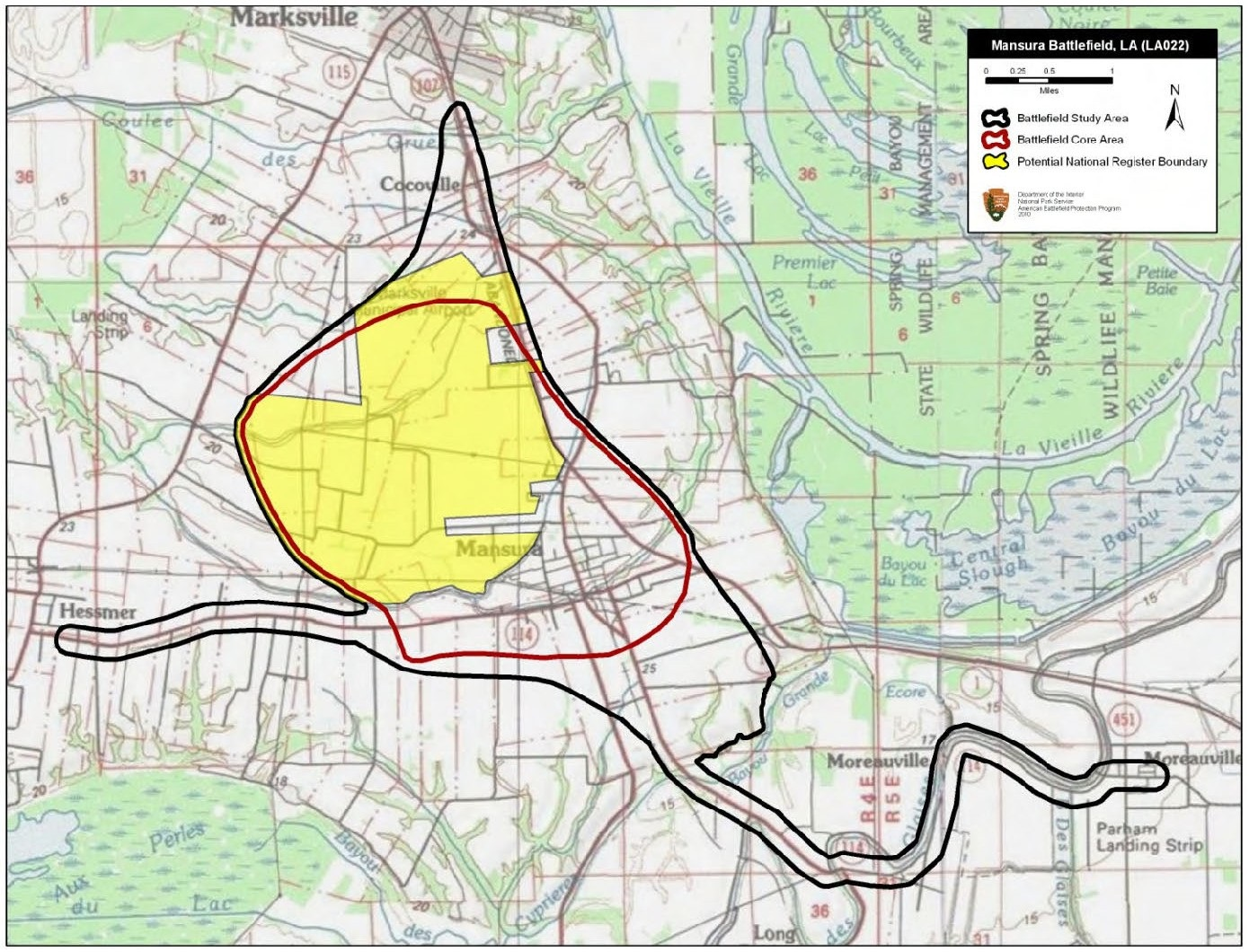
Map of Mansura Battlefield core and study areas by the American Battlefield Protection Program.

Early on the morning of May 16, the Union forces approached, and skirmishing quickly ensued. After a four-hour fight (principally an artillery duel), a large Union force massed for a flank attack, inducing the Confederates to fall back. The Union troops marched to Simmesport. Taylor's force harassed the enemy's retrograde movement, but was unable to halt it.
