= Battle of LaFourche Crossing =

Battle of the American Civil War

Coordinates: 29.7668°N 90.7646°W

- Part of American Civil War
Date	June 20, 1863 – June 21, 1863
Location	Lafourche Crossing, Louisiana
Result	Union victory

Belligerents
United States (Union)	(Confederate States of America) CSA (Confederacy)

Commanders and leaders
Albert Stickney	James P. Major

Units involved
Reinforced garrison of Lafourche Crossing	Major's cavalry brigade

Strength
838	roughly 800

Casualties and losses
49	roughly 130

The Battle of LaFourche Crossing (also spelled Lafourche Crossing) took place at Lafourche Crossing, Louisiana, on June 20–21, 1863, during the American Civil War. In order to support the besieged garrisons of Port Hudson, Louisiana, and Vicksburg, Mississippi, Confederate forces in the Trans-Mississippi Department went on the offensive. Major General John George Walker and his Texas Division were unsuccessful at supporting Vicksburg in northeast Louisiana, while Brigadier General Alfred Mouton led troops into the Lafourche region of southern Louisiana in support of Port Hudson. Both strikes were under the supervision of Major General Richard Taylor. One prong of the Lafourche offensive was made by Colonel James P. Major's brigade of Texas cavalry. Major's men raided Plaquemine and Bayou Goula before bypassing Fort Butler at Donaldsonville.

In response, the Union garrison at Lafourche Crossing was reinforced by troops under the command of Lieutenant Colonel Albert Stickney. Advance elements of Major's force captured Thibodaux on June 20 and cut the telegraph at Terrebonne Station, before probing the Lafourche Crossing defenses that afternoon. The Confederates waited for the rest of Major's brigade to arrive; Stickney also received additional reinforcements that night. Heavy rain hampered Confederate movements on June 21, and in the evening Colonel Charles L. Pyron led his 2nd Texas Cavalry Regiment in an unsupported assault on the Union line. Pyron's men were driven back with heavy losses. Major's men moved on from Lafourche Crossing and blocked the escape of Union troops retreating after the Capture of Brashear City, which led to their surrender on June 24. The Union garrison at Lafourche Crossing withdrew to New Orleans afterwards. The fall of Port Hudson on July 9 freed up additional Union troops for operations against the Confederates in the Lafourche region, and the Confederates withdrew to Franklin.

== Background ==
In April 1863, Union forces commanded by Major General Nathaniel P. Banks drove Confederate troops commanded by Major General Richard Taylor from the Lafourche region of western Louisiana in the Bayou Teche campaign. In May, Banks withdrew his forces from the newly-won territory, leaving small garrisons at various points along Bayou Lafourche, the New Orleans, Opelousas and Great Western Railroad, and the Mississippi River; Banks's main force then crossed the Mississippi and began the Siege of Port Hudson. Banks' operations at Port Hudson occurred simultaneously with Union Major General Ulysses S. Grant's Siege of Vicksburg. General Joseph E. Johnston, who was in command of Confederate forces in the Western theater of the war, had taken personal command of a small force which was tasked with relieving the Confederate force under siege in Vicksburg.

Taylor believed that he could use his forces to attack New Orleans, Louisiana, and force Banks to withdraw from Port Hudson to respond to the threat to New Orleans. This would then allow the Confederate garrison at Port Hudson to join forces with Johnston against Grant's troops at Vicksburg. The Confederate commander of the Trans-Mississippi Department, Lieutenant General E. Kirby Smith, rejected Taylor's plan. Smith instead supported a strike against Grant's supply lines along the west bank of the Mississippi River. Unknown to Smith, Grant's supply line was shorter and less exposed than it previously had been, as Grant had changed his supply line so that it ran to Haynes Bluff, which was east of the Mississippi River along the Yazoo River. The final plan placed Taylor in charge of two operations - one to be made against Grant's perceived supply lines in northeast Louisiana with Major General John G. Walker's Texas division and the other a strike into the Lafourche country under the command of Brigadier General Alfred Mouton. Walker's thrust failed at the Battle of Milliken's Bend on June 7. Smith initially agreed to release Walker's troops for operations in southern Louisiana, but then decided to hold Walker's Texans in northeast Louisiana for potential future operations against Vicksburg.

== Prelude ==
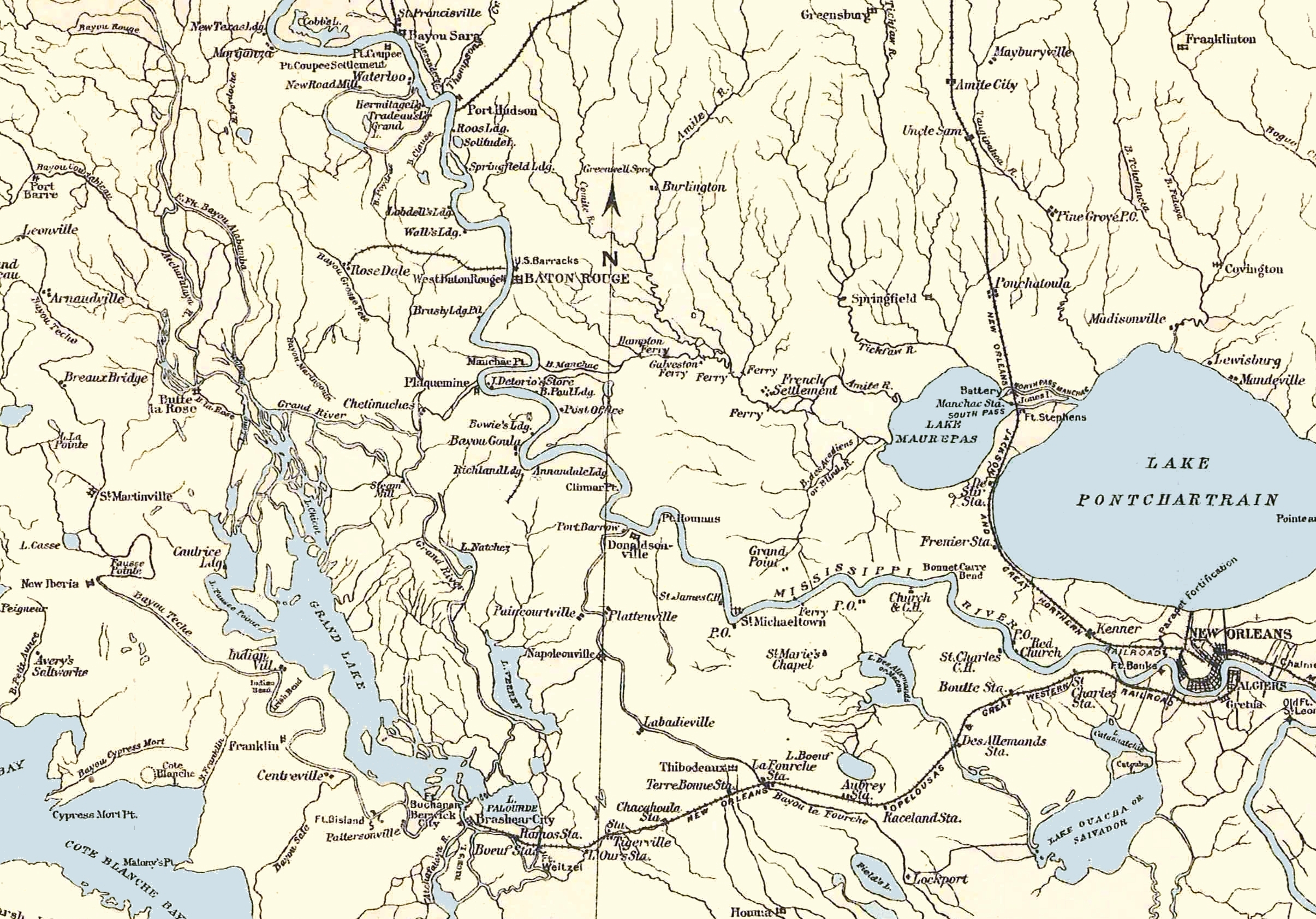
Map of Louisiana showing Port Hudson, New Orleans, and the areas in which Taylor's Lafourche campaign was fought

Available for the Lafourche operations were one infantry brigade of Louisiana troops, and two Texas cavalry brigades, a force that totaled 5,000 or 3,000 men. One of the cavalry brigades was commanded by Colonel James P. Major and the other by Brigadier General Thomas Green. Dividing his command in two, Taylor sent a force consisting of the troops of Mouton and Green to prepare to attack Brashear City, Louisiana; Major's troops were to advance along an indirect 150-mile (240 km) route and then cut the Brashear City garrison's line of retreat and communications. The Union troops at Brashear City suffered from high rates of illness. After several other officers either fell ill or declined command of the post, Lieutenant Colonel Albert Stickney was assigned to command the forces in the Lafourche region. Stickney, a member of the 47th Massachusetts Infantry Regiment, had previously been performing civil duties in New Orleans; he had no combat experience.

Major's troops crossed the Atchafalaya River on June 13. For the operation, his roughly 800-man brigade consisted of the 1st Texas Partisan Rangers, the 2nd Texas Partisan Rangers, the 2nd Texas Cavalry Regiment, the 3rd Texas Cavalry Regiment (Arizona Brigade), and Captain Oliver J. Semmes's 1st Confederate Regular Battery. The 3rd Texas (Arizona Brigade) overran the Union defenders of Plaquemine on June 18, capturing supplies and destroying five steamboats. The following day, the Confederates struck Bayou Goula, where they burned Union-operated plantations, captured additional supplies, and took over 1,000 freed African Americans. Of the former slaves, Major took the able-bodied adult males with him, but left the others to be a drain on Union resources. After attacking Bayou Goula, Major had to decide how he would join forces with Mouton's troops. Of the three available roads, one was blocked by Union-held Fort Butler at Donaldsonville. Another (the Sacramento Road) bypassed Donaldsonville, but had been obstructed, and the third, known as the Ricard Cut-Off, ran through swamps and could not be traversed by wagons or cannons.

Major used parts of the 2nd Texas Partisan Rangers and the 2nd Texas Cavalry in a feint towards Donaldsonville, while the recaptured African Americans cleared obstructions from the Sacramento Road. The 1st Texas Partisan Rangers and the 3rd Texas Cavalry (Arizona Brigade) were tasked with taking the Ricard Cut-Off, capturing Thibodaux, and then cutting the telegraph at Terrebonne Station. (Note: The location of Terrebonne Station was in what is now Schriever, Louisiana.) Stickney sent one company of the 1st Louisiana Cavalry Regiment (Union) under the command of Captain Charles Blober to scout for the Confederates. Blober's men scouted 10 miles (16 km) beyond Thibodaux, but turned around before encountering Major's Confederates. The Union forces in the Lafourche and at New Orleans were commanded by Brigadier General William H. Emory, who ordered Stickney to reinforce the existing Union garrison at Lafourche Crossing on June 20.

In response, Stickney personally led three companies of the 176th New York Infantry Regiment and one company from the 23rd Connecticut Infantry Regiment to reinforce Lafourche Crossing that morning. The movement was made by rail, and the 2nd Rhode Island Cavalry Regiment's Major Robert C. Anthony took command of the forces at Brashear City. Also on the morning of June 20, Major's main body had bypassed Donaldsonville. The 1st Texas Partisan Rangers and the 3rd Texas Cavalry (Arizona Brigade) struck Thibodaux the same day, pushed on to Terrebonne Station, and cut the telegraph there, ending Union communications with Brashear City. Emory received reports from Donaldsonville noting the sighting of Major's troops and the fact that they moved on from Donaldsonville, and Emory, fearing for the safety of Brashear City, started reinforcements from New Orleans to Lafourche Crossing and ordered Stickney to send some of his troops from Lafourche Crossing back to Brashear City. Before beginning the movement, Stickney had Blober's troopers scout again; this time contact was made with the Confederates. Union troops on outpost duty fled to Lafourche Crossing, and Stickney concluded that the Confederates held Thibodaux. Anthony, concerned about Stickney's situation after the telegraph line went dead, organized a reinforcing body which advanced up the rail line, but turned back when he learned that the Confederates had taken Terrebonne Station.

== Battle ==
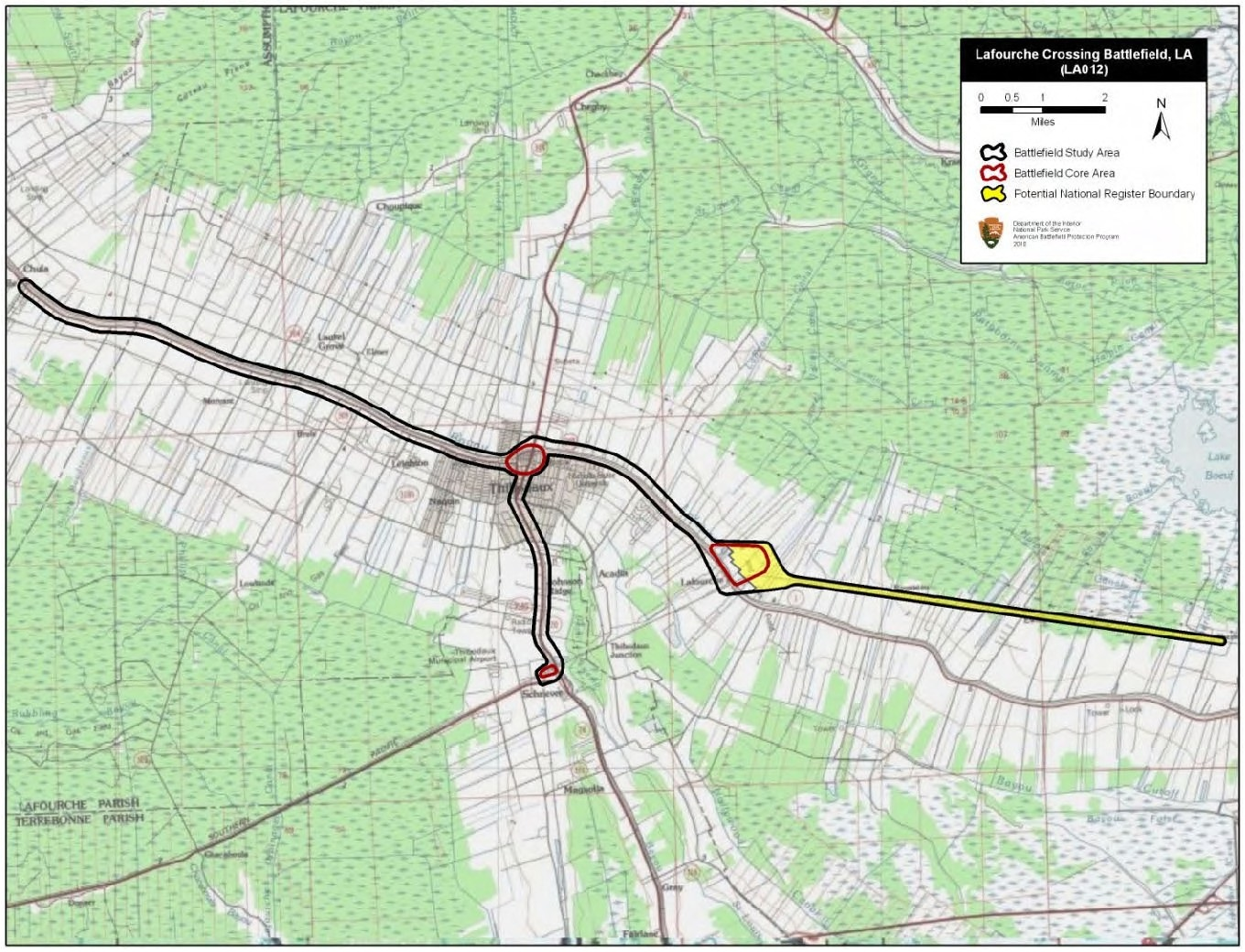
Map of LaFourche Crossing Battlefield core and study areas by the American Battlefield Protection Program.

=== June 20 ===
Stickney's force at Lafourche Crossing consisted of 502 soldiers and four cannons, with the troops drawn from several different units. Augmenting the force were detachments from other points in the area which had gathered at Lafourche Crossing. Roughly 200 men from three companies of the 23rd Connecticut were present, along with over 150 from three companies of the 176th New York. The 42nd Massachusetts Infantry Regiment had 46 men present, and a similar number of a mixed command were also available; this mixed command was mostly from the 26th Maine Infantry Regiment but also included soldiers from four others which had been present in the area on an assortment of duties. The cannons were manned by the 1st Indiana Heavy Artillery Regiment. These troops lacked combat experience. (Note: The 21st Indiana Infantry Regiment had been converted into the 1st Indiana Heavy Artillery in February 1863. Frazier refers to this unit as the "21st Indiana Heavy Artillery" (cf. p. 194), and Michot refers to it as the "21st Indiana Battery" (cf. p. 332))

The Union position was on the east side of Bayou Lafourche. The west side of the position was covered by the Bayou Lafourche levee, and the south by the embankment that the tracks of the railroad ran on. When including these features, the position was of rectangular shape, with a front line 200 yards (180 m) north of the railroad and a line on the east of the fortification 150 yards (140 m) from the bayou. For 50 feet (15 m) to 60 feet (18 m) from the angle of the front and east lines ran earthworks, which did not exceed 2 feet (0.61 m) in height. Blober's cavalry was held to the right and rear of this position. Of the cannons, a 12-pounder Napoleon was positioned at the east side of the bridge over the bayou, a 6-pounder cannon was positioned to support the left center of the front line, and two 12-pounder howitzers were on the front line near the angle. The men from the 26th Maine supported the cannon at the bridge. One company of the 23rd Connecticut under the command of Major David H. Miller of that regiment was thrown forward 450 yards (410 m) or 400 yards (370 m) in front of the main line as pickets. Stickney's other infantry held the main Union line.

The 1st Texas Partisan Rangers (under the command of Colonel Walter P. Lane) and the 3rd Texas Cavalry (Arizona Brigade) (under the command of Colonel Joseph Phillips), pushed towards Lafourche Crossing on the afternoon June 20, lacking information regarding the strength of the Union force there. They encountered and drove back Blober's men, who had been sent forward to locate the Confederates. The Confederates came under fire from the cannon near the bridge, and stopped to throw out skirmishers. The skirmishers made contact with the advance company of the 23rd Connecticut. Miller fled, followed by his men, but the pursuing Confederates withdrew after coming under fire from all of the Union artillery. Having determined that the position at Lafourche Crossing could not be taken without the rest of Major's brigade, Lane and Phillips withdrew their men back to Thibodaux, where they were joined by the rest of Major's brigade. That night, many of the Confederate troops at Thibodaux got drunk. Major was aware that the position at Lafourche Crossing was important, but that it was not necessary to take it; instead he could pin the Union troops there in place with a feint while continuing on towards Brashear City if Lafourche Crossing was too strongly-defended to take.

=== June 21 ===
Overnight, Stickney had buildings in front of his line which had been used as a field hospital evacuated and then burned to deny the Confederates their use as cover. Another building west of the bayou was burned; along with the burning buildings on the east side of the bayou, the light would reveal any Confederate attempts to approach Lafourche Crossing during the night. Overnight, 306 men from the 26th Massachusetts Infantry Regiment under the command of Lieutenant Colonel Josiah A. Sawtell arrived by rail from New Orleans. Sawtell was senior to Stickney, but allowed Stickney to remain in command as he had started the battle. On the morning of June 21, two guns from the 25th New York Battery arrived, bringing the total Union strength to 838 men. Major gathered his forces on the morning of June 21, and in response to reports of Union probes towards Thibodaux, sent Colonel Charles L. Pyron and his 2nd Texas Cavalry along with part of Semmes's battery and the 2nd Texas Partisan Rangers to scout the Union position. Major sent his remaining troops to Terrebonne Station across the bayou to isolate Lafourche Crossing from Brashear City. Pyron was tasked with estimating the Union strength, which would determine how Major acted next.

Heavy rain fell until 5:00 p.m., and ruined much of the Confederate ammunition. Pyron's advance was slow, and the Confederates skirmished with the Union pickets. Visibility was low. The historian Donald S. Frazier estimates that the rain left Pyron's men with an average of 3 dry cartridges per man. After the rain ended, Major gave orders for Pyron to "feel the enemy, find his position, and test his strength". Along with the section of Semmes's battery (which was commanded by Lieutenant John A. A. West), Pyron advanced with the 206 men of his regiment. The historian Stephen S. Michot describes Pyron's following actions as "loosely interpreting his orders and intending to make a good showing in front of Major and his fellow regimental commanders". Two companies of the 2nd Texas Partisan Rangers advanced in support on the other side of the bayou. At 6:30 or 6:45, the Confederates opened fire with a single cannon, which was the only one of the Confederate pieces with dry ammunition. Union artillery fire soon silenced the Confederate gun.

Stickney tried to bait the Confederate into attacking by having Blober's men bluff a charge towards the Confederate line, but this did not work. One gun from the 25th New York Battery was advanced forward to where the men from the 42nd Massachusetts held an advanced line, and the cannon began firing into the Confederate line. At roughly 7:00, Pyron's men charged. The men of the 42nd Massachusetts fell back, and the advanced gun was overrun. It was growing dark, and visibility was low. Pyron was wounded by artillery fire while leading his men, and his second-in-command surrendered after receiving a wound, although he escaped from Union captivity after the battle. Confederate soldiers captured the two cannons positioned at the angle in the Union line, but were driven off after hand-to-hand fighting. Many of the Union soldiers panicked and boarded the cars of a train parked on the tracks at Lafourche Crossing; the train's engineer then drove the train east away from the battle. The commander of the two companies west of the bayou tasked with supporting Pyron did not add his troops to the fighting, although Frazier believes that their employment would have only resulted in additional Confederate casualties. Major had not expected Pyron to launch a full-on attack and was unprepared to support it; the historian Stephen S. Michot describes the assault as "near suicidal". Pyron's troops made three distinct assaults.

The Union's superior numbers began to tell, as did enfilade fire from a Union artillery piece. Despite requests from his subordinates to add more men to the fighting, Major refused to commit any more troops. He believed that the sound of the fleeing train represented Union reinforcements arriving by rail. The fighting broke off at around 8:00. Stickney's losses were 8 men killed and 41 wounded. Exact Confederate losses are unknown, but the historian John D. Winters notes that "conservative estimates" for Confederate losses were a minimum of 50 men killed, more than 60 wounded, and 16 missing. Union reports claimed Confederate losses of 53 killed, not quite 60 wounded, and 16 captured. Frazier states that almost 60 wounded Confederates were evacuated from the field under a flag of truce the morning after the battle, and that roughly two dozen Confederates were captured.

== Aftermath ==
Rain on June 22 prevented a follow-up attack by Major. Early on the morning of June 23, Mouton and Green's force assaulted Brashear City. Confederate troops crossed Berwick Bay and surprised the Union defenders with a flank attack. Major's men moved from Lafourche Crossing and blocked the Union retreat at the crossing of Bayou Boeuf. The Union soldiers surrendered on June 24, trapped between Major's and Green's forces. The Union position at Lafourche Crossing had been reinforced to 1,700 men and was now commanded by Colonel Thomas W. Cahill. The reunited Confederate force advanced towards Lafourche Crossing, reoccuppying Thibodaux and taking Chacahoula Station. Cahill's men fell back to New Orleans. Taylor left for Alexandria to try to get Walker's force added to the Lafourche campaign, and command of the campaign went to Mouton.

Some Confederate cavalry pursued to Boutte Station, which was 20 miles (32 km) from New Orleans, while Green and Major were sent towards Donaldsonville. An assault on Fort Butler after midnight on the night of June 27/28 failed in the Second Battle of Donaldsonville. The Confederates had suffered heavy casualties. Port Hudson fell on July 9, which allowed additional Union troops to be released for operations against Mouton. The Confederates drove some of these additional troops back in the Battle of Kock's Plantation on July 13, but Mouton withdrew to Brashear City. Upon learning that Union Navy ships were approaching Berwick Bay, Mouton withdrew to Franklin. Union troops pursued to Brashear City and Thibodaux, where they halted to rest. Taylor's troops left the Lafourche region on July 21.

== Sources ==
- Frazier, Donald S. (2015). Blood on the Bayou: Vicksburg, Port Hudson, and the Trans-Mississippi. Buffalo Gap, Texas: State House Press. ISBN 978-1-933337-62-3.
- Michot, Stephen S. (2002). "In Relief of Port Hudson: Richard Taylor's 1863 Lafourche Offensive". In Bergeron, Arthur W. (ed.). The Louisiana Purchase Bicentennial Series in Louisiana History. Vol. V: The Civil War in Louisiana, Part A: Military Activities. Lafayette, Louisiana: Center for Louisiana Studies. pp. 328–354. ISBN 1-887366-50-4.
- Parrish, T. Michael (1992). Richard Taylor: Soldier Prince of Dixie. Chapel Hill, North Carolina: University of North Carolina Press. ISBN 0-8078-2032-6.
- Welcher, Frank J. (1993). The Union Army 1861–1865: Organization and Operations. Vol. II: The Western Theater. Bloomington, Indiana: Indiana University Press. ISBN 0-253-36454-X.
- Winters, John D. (1991) [1963]. The Civil War in Louisiana. Baton Rouge, Louisiana: Louisiana State University Press. ISBN 0-8071-1725-0.
