= Charles C. Nott =

American judge

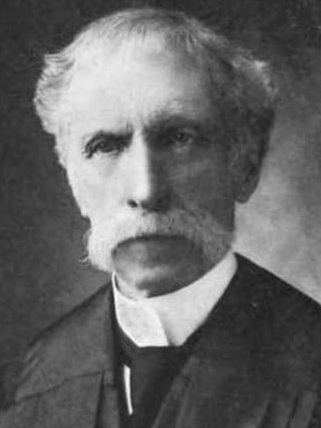

Chief Justice of the Court of Claims
- In office November 23, 1896 – December 31, 1905
- Appointed by: Grover Cleveland
- Preceded by: William Adams Richardson
- Succeeded by: Stanton J. Peelle

Judge of the Court of Claims
- In office February 22, 1865 – November 23, 1896
- Appointed by: Abraham Lincoln
- Preceded by: James Hughes
- Succeeded by: Charles Bowen Howry

Personal details
- Born: Charles Cooper Nott; September 16, 1827 Schenectady, New York, U.S.
- Died: March 9, 1916 (aged 88) New York City, New York, U.S.
- Children: Charles Cooper Nott Jr.
- Relatives: Eliphalet Nott
- Education: Union College (AB)

Military service
- Allegiance: United States of America
- Branch/service: Union Army
- Years of service: 1861-1865
- Rank: Colonel
- Unit: 5th Iowa Cavalry Regiment; 131st New York Infantry Regiment; 176th New York Infantry Regiment
- Commands: 176th New York Infantry Regiment
- Battles/wars: American Civil War

Charles Cooper Nott Sr. (September 16, 1827 – March 6, 1916) was an Associate Justice and Chief Justice of the Court of Claims.

== Education and career ==
Born on September 16, 1827, in Schenectady, New York, Nott received an Artium Baccalaureus degree in 1848 from Union College and read law in Albany, New York in 1850. He entered private practice in New York City, New York from 1851 to 1861. He was a captain and colonel in the United States Army from 1861 to 1864 during the American Civil War. He resumed private practice in New York City from 1864 to 1865.

=== Details of his military service ===
Nott was appointed a captain in the Fremont Hussars, was in the 5th Iowa Cavalry, and the 131st New York Volunteer Infantry and the 176th New York Volunteer Infantry, achieving the rank of colonel. He was subsequently captured at the fall of Brashear City, and held as a prisoner of war in Texas for thirteen months.

== Federal judicial service ==
Nott was nominated by President Abraham Lincoln on February 21, 1865, to a Judge seat on the Court of Claims (later the United States Court of Claims) vacated by Judge James Hughes. He was confirmed by the United States Senate on February 22, 1865, and received his commission the same day. His service terminated on November 23, 1896, due to his elevation to be Chief Justice of the same court.

Nott received a recess appointment from President Grover Cleveland on November 23, 1896, to the Chief Justice seat on the Court of Claims (later the United States Court of Claims) vacated by Chief Justice William Adams Richardson. He was nominated to the same position by President Cleveland on December 8, 1896. He was confirmed by the Senate on December 15, 1896, and received his commission the same day. His service terminated on December 31, 1905, due to his resignation.

=== Notable case ===
Nott wrote the unanimous opinion in Mrs. Lockwood's Case, 9 Ct. Cl. 346 (1874), denying Belva Ann Lockwood admission to the bar of the Court of Claims. She appealed to the United States Supreme Court and lost there as well.

=== Reporter of decisions ===
Concurrent with his service on the same court, Nott served as reporter of decisions for the Court of Claims from 1867 to 1914. He was the reporter of decisions of forty-eight volumes of the Court of Claims Reports.

== Death ==
Nott died on March 9, 1916, in New York City.

== Family ==
Nott was the son of Professor Joel B. Nott, a chemist and mineralogist. He was a grandson of Eliphalet Nott, a longtime President of Union College. His son, Charles Cooper Nott Jr., was a judge of the Special Sessions Court.

== Sources ==
- A treatise on the mechanics' lien laws of the state of New York (W. C. Little & co., 1856) LCCN 34-8900
- The coming contraband: a reason against the Emancipation Proclamation, not given by Mr. Justice Curtis, to whom it is addressed, by an officer in the field. (G.P. Putnam, 1862) LCCN 57-53571 Charles C. Nott at the Internet Archive
- Sketches of the war (C.T. Evans, 1863; A.D.F. Randolph, 1865) LCCN 02-17786 Charles C. Nott at the Internet Archive
- Sketches in prison camps (A. D. F. Randolph, 1865) LCCN 02-1191 Charles C. Nott at the Internet Archive
- The seven great hymns of the mediaeval church (Anson D. F. Randolph, 1866) OCLC 43736585 LCCN 02-18762 (New York, E. S. Gorham, 1902) Charles C. Nott at the Internet Archive
- The Mystery of Pinckney Draught, New York (The Century Co., 1908) LCCN 08-33815 Charles C. Nott at the Internet Archive

Legal offices
Preceded by James Hughes	Judge of the Court of Claims; 1865–1896	Succeeded by Charles Bowen Howry
Preceded by William Adams Richardson	Chief Justice of the Court of Claims; 1896–1905	Succeeded by Stanton J. Peelle
