= Elmer B. Adams =

American judge (1842–1916)

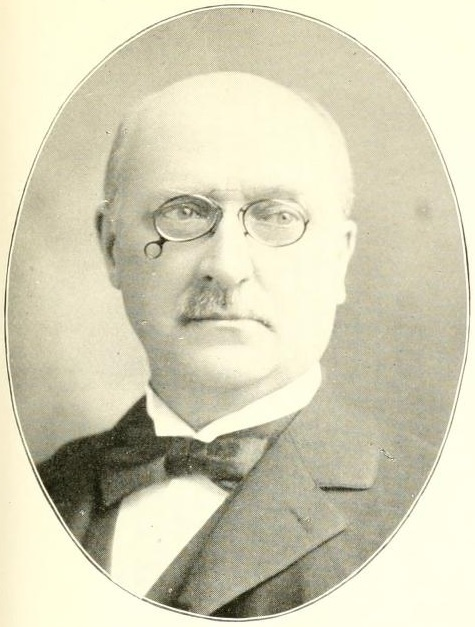
- From Notable St. Louisans in 1900

Judge of the United States Court of Appeals for the Eighth Circuit
- In office May 20, 1905 – October 24, 1916
- Appointed by: Theodore Roosevelt
- Preceded by: Amos Madden Thayer
- Succeeded by: Kimbrough Stone

Judge of the United States Circuit Courts for the Eighth Circuit
- In office May 20, 1905 – December 31, 1911
- Appointed by: Theodore Roosevelt
- Preceded by: Amos Madden Thayer
- Succeeded by: Seat abolished

Judge of the United States District Court for the Eastern District of Missouri
- In office May 17, 1895 – May 29, 1905
- Appointed by: Grover Cleveland
- Preceded by: Henry Samuel Priest
- Succeeded by: Gustavus A. Finkelnburg

Personal details
- Born: Elmer Bragg Adams; October 27, 1842 Pomfret, Vermont, U.S.
- Died: October 24, 1916 (aged 73) St. Louis, Missouri, U.S.
- Resting place: River Street Cemetery; Woodstock, Vermont
- Party: Democratic
- Spouse: Emma Richmond
- Education: Yale University (BA); Harvard Law School (LLB); University of Missouri (LLD)

Elmer Bragg Adams (October 27, 1842 – October 24, 1916) was a United States circuit judge of the United States Court of Appeals for the Eighth Circuit and of the United States Circuit Courts for the Eighth Circuit and previously was a United States district judge of the United States District Court for the Eastern District of Missouri.

== Education and career ==
Adams was born on October 27, 1842, in Pomfret, Vermont, a lineal descendant of Henry Adams of Braintree, Massachusetts. He received a Bachelor of Arts degree from Yale University in 1865 and graduated from Harvard Law School in 1868. He was a teacher for the American Union Commission in Georgia from 1865 to 1866, and then engaged in the private practice of law in St. Louis, Missouri, from 1866 to 1879. He was a state court judge of the St. Louis Circuit Court from 1879 to 1884, thereafter returning to private practice in St. Louis until 1895. He also received the degree LL.D. from the University of Missouri in 1896.

== Federal judicial service ==
Adams received a recess appointment from President Grover Cleveland on May 17, 1895, to a seat on the United States District Court for the Eastern District of Missouri vacated by Judge Henry Samuel Priest. He was nominated to the same position by President Cleveland on December 4, 1895. He was confirmed by the United States Senate on December 9, 1895, and received his commission the same day. His service terminated on May 29, 1905, due to his elevation to the Eighth Circuit.

Adams received a recess appointment from President Theodore Roosevelt on May 20, 1905, to a joint seat on the United States Court of Appeals for the Eighth Circuit and the United States Circuit Courts for the Eighth Circuit vacated by Judge Amos Madden Thayer. He was nominated to the same position by President Roosevelt on December 5, 1905. He was confirmed by the Senate on December 12, 1905, and received his commission the same day. On December 31, 1911, the Circuit Courts were abolished and he thereafter served only on the Court of Appeals. His service terminated on October 24, 1916, due to his death in St. Louis.

== Personal life ==
Adams was married to Emma Richmond of Woodstock, Vermont in 1870.

== Sources ==
- Leonard, John William; Marquis, Albert Nelson, eds. (1908), Who's who in America, vol. 5, Chicago: Marquis Who's Who, Incorporated, p. 9

Legal offices
Preceded by Henry Samuel Priest	Judge of the United States District Court for the Eastern District of Missouri; 1895–1905	Succeeded by Gustavus A. Finkelnburg
Preceded by Amos Madden Thayer	Judge of the United States Circuit Courts for the Eighth Circuit; 1905–1911	Succeeded by Seat abolished
Preceded by Amos Madden Thayer	Judge of the United States Court of Appeals for the Eighth Circuit; 1905–1916	Succeeded by Kimbrough Stone
