= James Hughes (Indiana politician) =

American politician & jurist (1823–1873)

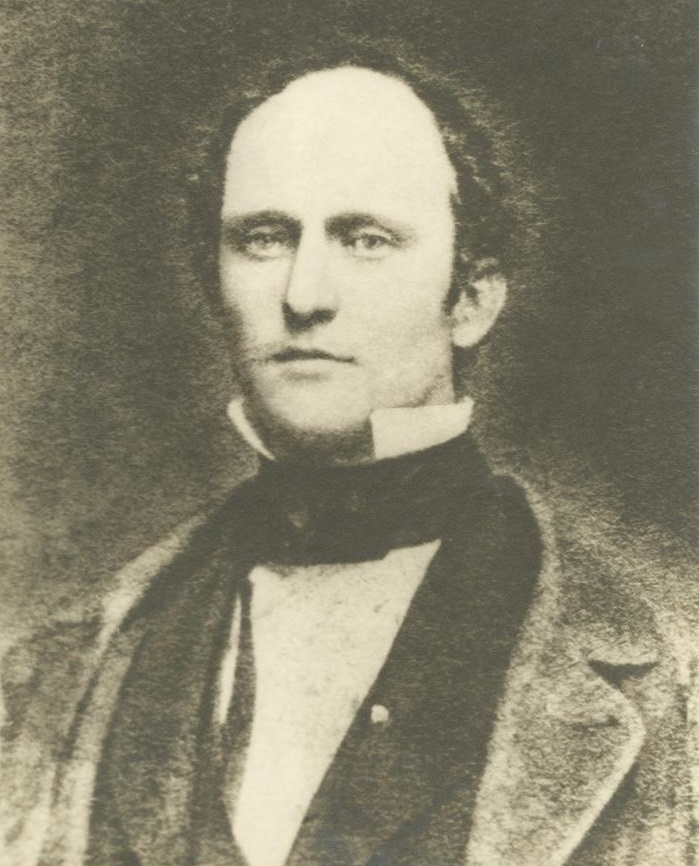

Judge of the Court of Claims
- In office January 18, 1860 – December 1, 1864
- Appointed by: James Buchanan
- Preceded by: Isaac Blackford
- Succeeded by: Charles C. Nott

Member of the U.S. House of Representatives from Indiana's 3rd district
- In office March 4, 1857 – March 3, 1859
- Preceded by: George Grundy Dunn
- Succeeded by: William McKee Dunn

Personal details
- Born: James Hughes; November 24, 1823 Bladensburg, Maryland, U.S.
- Died: October 24, 1873 (aged 49) Bladensburg, Maryland, U.S.
- Resting place: Rose Hill Cemetery; Bloomington, Indiana
- Party: Democratic
- Education: Indiana University Bloomington; United States Military Academy
- Profession: Attorney

James Hughes (November 24, 1823 – October 24, 1873) was a United States representative from Indiana and a judge of the Court of Claims.

== Education and career ==
Born on November 24, 1823, in Bladensburg, Maryland, (Note: Hughes Congressional Biography gives his place of birth as Baltimore County, Maryland.) Hughes attended the common schools, Indiana University Bloomington, the United States Military Academy and read law in 1842. He was admitted to the bar and entered private practice in Bloomington and Bedford, Indiana from 1842 to 1852. He served as a lieutenant in the United States Army during the Mexican–American War. He was a judge of the Indiana Circuit Court for the Sixth Judicial Circuit from 1852 to 1856. He was professor of law at Indiana University Bloomington from 1853 to 1856.

== Congressional service ==
Hughes was elected as a Democrat from Indiana's 3rd congressional district to the United States House of Representatives of the 35th United States Congress, serving from March 4, 1857, to March 3, 1859. He was an unsuccessful candidate for reelection in 1858 to the 36th United States Congress.

== Federal judicial service ==
Hughes was nominated by President James Buchanan on January 12, 1860, to a seat on the Court of Claims (later the United States Court of Claims) vacated by Judge Isaac Blackford. He was confirmed by the United States Senate on January 18, 1860, and received his commission the same day. His service terminated on December 1, 1864, due to his resignation.

== Later career ==
Following his resignation from the federal bench, Hughes was a cotton agent for the United States Department of the Treasury from 1865 to 1866. He was a member of the Indiana House of Representatives from 1866 to 1868, and a member of the Indiana Senate from 1868 to 1869. He resumed private practice in Washington, D.C. from 1869 to 1873.

== Death ==
Hughes died on October 21, 1873, in Bladensburg. (Note: Hughes Congressional Biography gives his place of death as Wattsville, Maryland.) He was interred in Rose Hill Cemetery in Bloomington.

== Sources ==
- United States Congress. "James Hughes (id: H000923)". Biographical Directory of the United States Congress.
- "Hughes, James - Federal Judicial Center". www.fjc.gov.

U.S. House of Representatives
Preceded by George Grundy Dunn	Member of the U.S. House of Representatives from Indiana's 3rd congressional district 1857–1859	Succeeded by William McKee Dunn
Legal offices
Preceded by Isaac Blackford	Judge of the Court of Claims; 1860–1864	Succeeded by Charles C. Nott
