= 2nd Texas Cavalry Regiment =

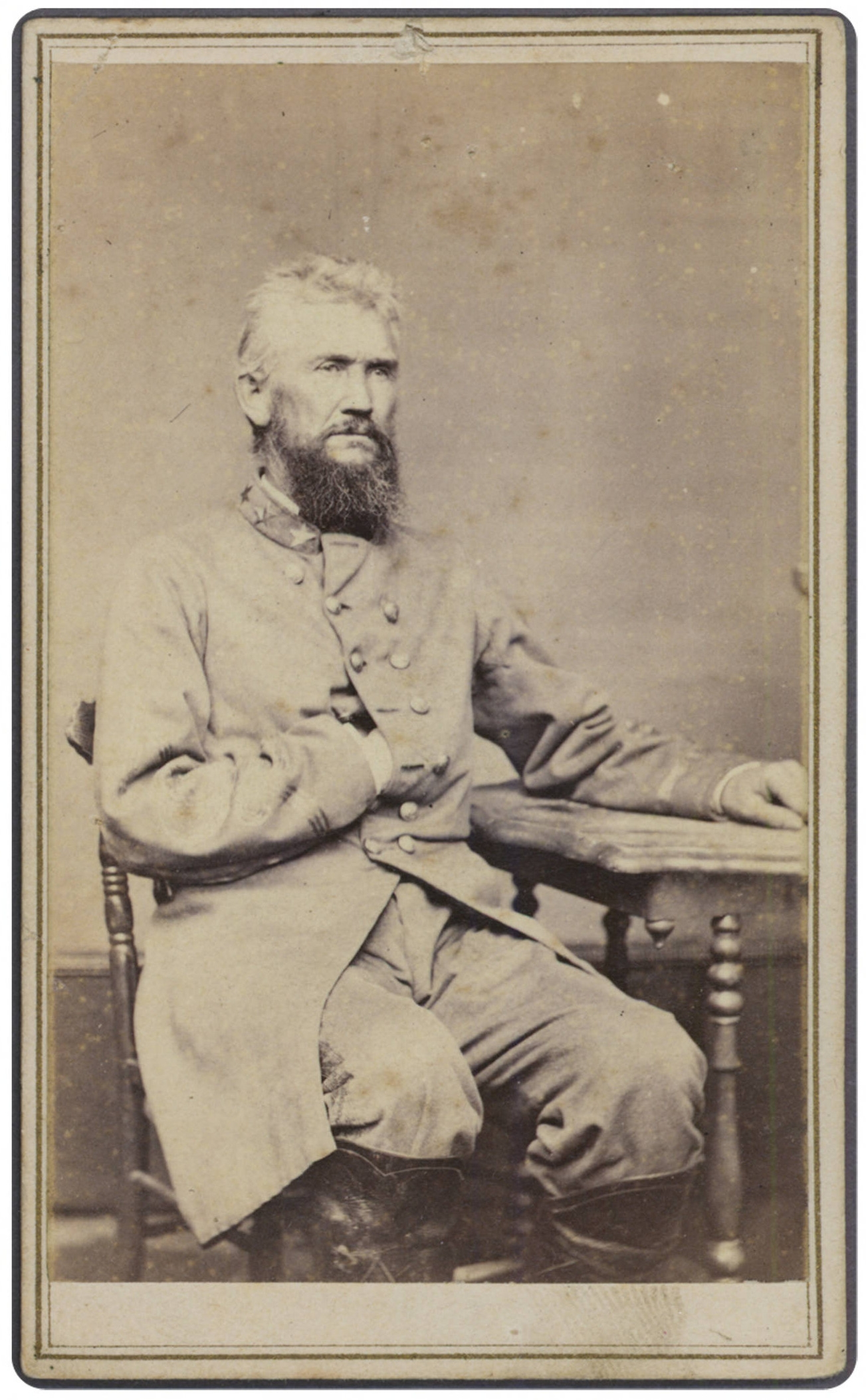
- John S. "Rip" Ford was the regiment's first colonel.
- Active: May 1861 – 2 June 1865
- Country: Confederate States of America
- Allegiance: Confederate States of America, Texas
- Branch: Confederate States Army
- Type: Cavalry
- Size: Regiment (752 men, Nov. 1862)
- Engagements: American Civil War; Battle of Valverde (1862); Battle of Glorieta Pass (1862); Battle of Galveston (1863); Battle of Arkansas Post (1863); Battle of LaFourche Crossing (1863); 2nd Battle of Donaldsonville (1863); Battle of Kock's Plantation (1863); Battle of Stirling's Plantation (1863); Battle of Bayou Bourbeux (1863)

Commanders
- Notable commanders: John Salmon Ford

The 2nd Texas Cavalry Regiment was a volunteer cavalry unit from Texas that fought in the Confederate Army during the American Civil War. The unit was organized in May 1861 as the 2nd Texas Mounted Rifles. In early 1862, the regiment took part in the unsuccessful New Mexico Campaign before retreating to Texas. In April 1862 the unit reorganized at Austin, Texas, as the 2nd Texas Cavalry. In January 1863, part of the regiment helped recapture Galveston while another part was captured at Arkansas Post. After moving to Louisiana, the unit fought at LaFourche Crossing, Second Donaldsonville, Kock's Plantation, Sterling's Plantation, and Bayou Bourbeux. It returned to Texas in winter 1863 and remained there until the surrender in June 1865.

== See also ==
- List of Texas Civil War Confederate units
