= 176th New York Infantry Regiment =

U.S. Civil War infantry regiment

- Active: September 4, 1862 – April 27, 1866
- Country: United States
- Allegiance: Union
- Branch: Infantry
- Engagements: Operations in Louisiana; Battle of LaFourche Crossing; Battle of Thibodeaux (Company D); Battle of Fort Buchanan; Red River Campaign; Battle of Mansura; Battle of Fort Stevens; Valley Campaigns of 1864; Third Battle of Winchester; Battle of Fisher's Hill; Battle of Cedar Creek; Carolinas campaign

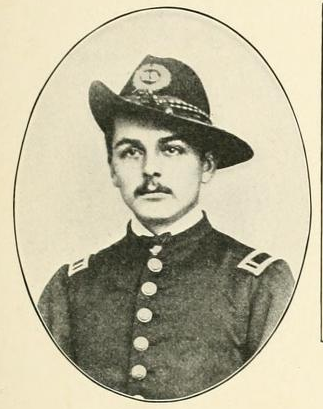
Lt. George Haven Putnam

The 176th New York Infantry Regiment (a.k.a. "Ironsides") was an infantry regiment in the Union Army during the American Civil War.

== Service ==
The 176th New York Infantry was recruited at large New York November 20, 1862 through January 10, 1863 and mustered in December 22, 1862 for three-years service under the command of Colonel Charles C. Nott.

The regiment was attached to Defenses of New Orleans, Louisiana, Department of the Gulf, to February 1864. 1st Brigade, 2nd Division, XIX Corps, Department of the Gulf, to June 1864. 3rd Brigade, 2nd Division, XIX Corps, Department of the Gulf, to July 1864, and Army of the Shenandoah, Middle Military Division, to January 1865. 3rd Brigade, Grover's Division, District of Savannah, Department of the South, to March 1865. 3rd Brigade, 1st Division, X Corps, Army of the Ohio, Department of North Carolina, to May 1865. District of Savannah, Georgia, Department of the South, to July 1865. Districts of Augusta and Columbus, Georgia, Department of Georgia, to April 1866.

The 176th New York Infantry mustered out at Savannah, Georgia on April 27, 1866.

== Detailed service ==
The regiment left New York for New Orleans, Louisiana, January 11, 1863. Duty in the District of LaFourche, defenses of New Orleans, guarding lines of New Orleans & Opelousas Railroad at Brashear City, LaFourche Crossing, Tigerville, Bonnet Carte, and other points until January 1864. Actions at Pattersonville June 17 and 19, 1863. LaFourche Crossing June 19–21. Thibodeaux June 20 (Company D). Fort Buchanan and Bayou Boeuf June 23. Brashear City June 23. Ordered to Franklin, Louisiana, January 4, 1864, and duty there until April. Red River Campaign April 15-May 22. Moved from Carrollton to Alexandria April 15–18. At Alexandria until May 13. Gov. Moore's Plantation May 3. Wilson's Farm May 5. Retreat to Morganza May 13–20. Mansura May 16. At Morganza until July 3. Moved to New Orleans, then to Fort Monroe, Virginia, and Washington, D.C., July 3–29. Sheridan's Shenandoah Valley Campaign August 7-November 28. Berryville September 8. Battle of Winchester September 19. Fisher's Hill September 22. Battle of Cedar Creek October 19. At Kernstown and Winchester until January 5, 1865. Moved to Savannah, Georgia, January 5–22, and duty there until March. Moved to Wilmington, North Carolina, March 5, then to Morehead City March 10, and duty there until April 8. Moved to Goldsboro, North Carolina, April 8, and duty there until May 2. Moved to Savannah May 2–7. Duty there and the Districts of Augusta, Columbus, and Macon, Georgia, Department of Georgia, until April 1866.

== Casualties ==
The regiment lost a total of 180 men during service; 2 officers and 30 enlisted men killed or mortally wounded, 2 officers and 146 enlisted men died of disease.

== Commanders ==
- Colonel Charles C. Nott - captured at the Battle of Fort Buchanan; only 156 men escaped capture
- Colonel Ambrose Stevens
- Colonel Charles Lewis
- Captain Charles Barber - commanded the regiment after the Battle of Fort Buchanan

== See also ==
- List of New York Civil War regiments
- New York in the Civil War
