= James Major =

James Major may refer to:

- James Earl Major (1887–1972), U.S. federal judge
- James Patrick Major (1836–1877), American Civil War Confederate brigadier general

== See also ==
- St. James the Great, biblical apostle also referred to as "St. James Major"
