= J. McKenzie Moss =

American politician and jurist (1868–1929)

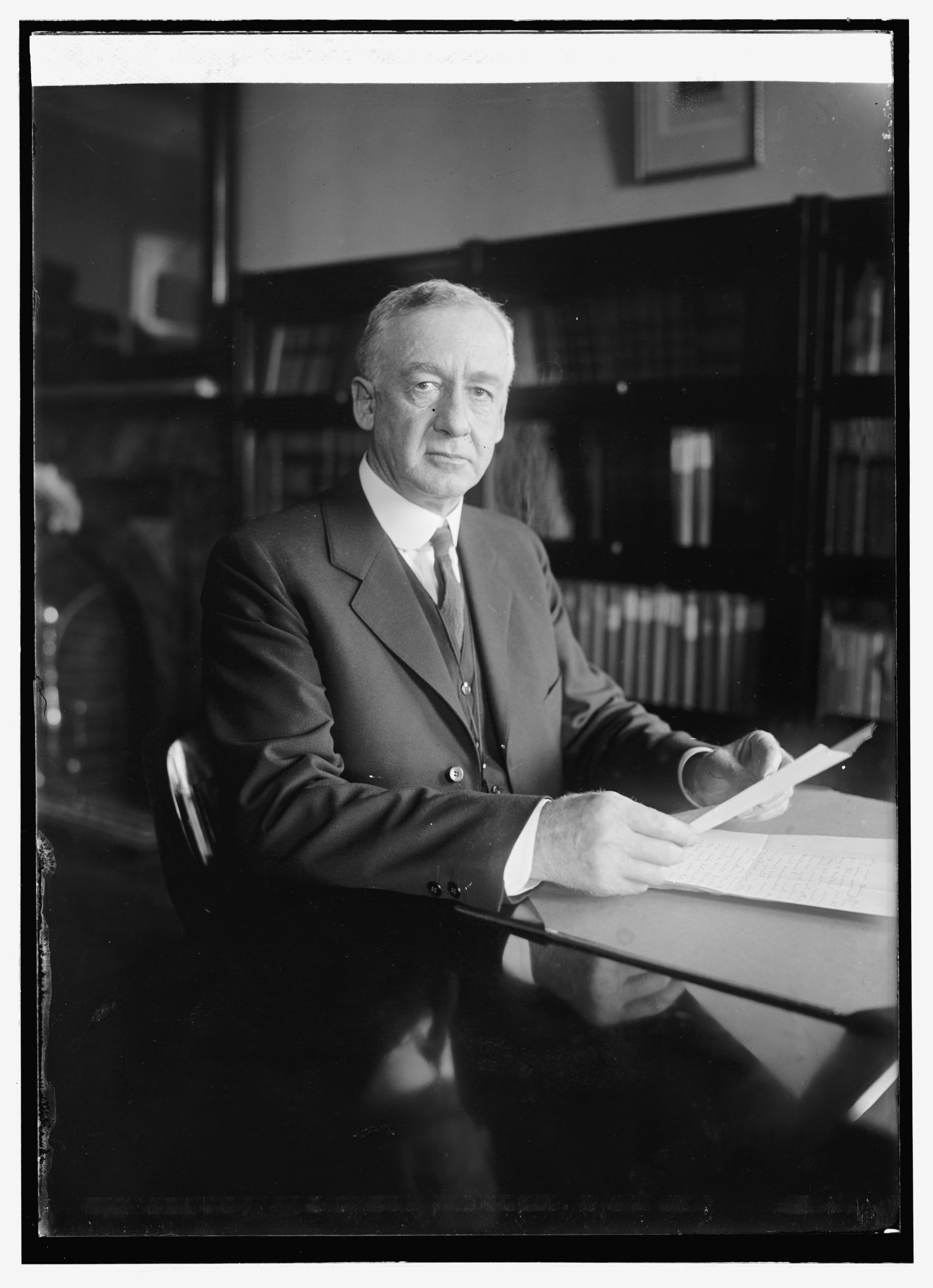
- Moss in 1923

Judge of the Court of Claims
- In office June 7, 1926 – June 11, 1929
- Appointed by: Calvin Coolidge
- Preceded by: George Eddy Downey
- Succeeded by: Benjamin Horsley Littleton

Member of the U.S. House of Representatives from Kentucky's 3rd district
- In office March 25, 1902 – March 3, 1903
- Preceded by: John Stockdale Rhea
- Succeeded by: John Stockdale Rhea

Personal details
- Born: John McKenzie Moss; January 3, 1868 Bennettstown, Kentucky, US
- Died: June 11, 1929 (aged 61) Washington, D.C., US
- Resting place: Powell Cemetery; LaFayette, Kentucky, US
- Party: Republican
- Relatives: James A. McKenzie
- Education: Kent College of Law read law

John McKenzie Moss (January 3, 1868 – June 11, 1929) was an American politician and judge who was a U.S. representative from Kentucky from 1902 to 1903 and a judge of the Court of Claims from 1926 to 1929.

== Education and career ==
Born on January 3, 1868, on a farm near Bennettstown, an unincorporated community in Christian County, Kentucky, Moss was a nephew of James A. McKenzie. He attended the common and private schools, the Kent College of Law (now the Chicago-Kent College of Law), and read law with W.G. and A.T. Ewing in Chicago in 1893. He worked for the Railway Mail Service from 1888 to 1891. He was admitted to the bar and entered private practice in Bowling Green, Kentucky from 1893 to 1902. During the same time period he worked in other counties adjoining Warren County.

== Congressional service ==
Moss successfully contested as a Republican the election of John Stockdale Rhea to the United States House of Representatives of the 57th United States Congress and served from March 25, 1902, to March 3, 1903. He was an unsuccessful candidate for reelection in 1902 to the 58th United States Congress.

== Later career ==
Moss returned to private practice in Bowling Green from 1903 to 1909. He was a judge of the Kentucky Circuit Court for the Eighth Judicial District from 1909 to 1921. He worked in the Office of Alien Property Custodian from 1921 to 1922, as assistant general counsel from 1921 to 1922 and as general counsel in 1922. He was Deputy Commissioner of the Bureau of Internal Revenue (now the Internal Revenue Service) in charge of estate and capital tax in the United States Department of the Treasury from 1922 to 1923. He was an Assistant Secretary of the Treasury from 1923 to 1926.

== Federal judicial service ==
Moss was nominated by President Calvin Coolidge on May 26, 1926, to a seat on the Court of Claims (later the United States Court of Claims) vacated by Judge George Eddy Downey. He was confirmed by the United States Senate on June 7, 1926, and received his commission the same day. His service terminated on June 11, 1929, due to his death in Washington, D.C. He was interred in Powell Cemetery in LaFayette, Christian County, Kentucky.

== Sources ==
- United States Congress. "J. McKenzie Moss (id: M001036)". Biographical Directory of the United States Congress.
- "Moss, John McKenzie - Federal Judicial Center". www.fjc.gov.
- The United States Court of Claims : a history / pt. 1. The judges, 1855-1976 / by Marion T. Bennett / pt. 2. Origin, development, jurisdiction, 1855-1978 / W. Cowen, P. Nichols, M.T. Bennett. Washington, D.C.: Committee on the Bicentennial of Independence and the Constitution of the Judicial Conference of the United States. 1976.

U.S. House of Representatives
Preceded by John Stockdale Rhea	United States Representative for the Kentucky's 3rd district 1902–1903	Succeeded by John Stockdale Rhea
Legal offices
Preceded by George Eddy Downey	Judge of the Court of Claims; 1926–1929	Succeeded by Benjamin Horsley Littleton
