= Henry Samuel Priest =

American judge (1853–1930)

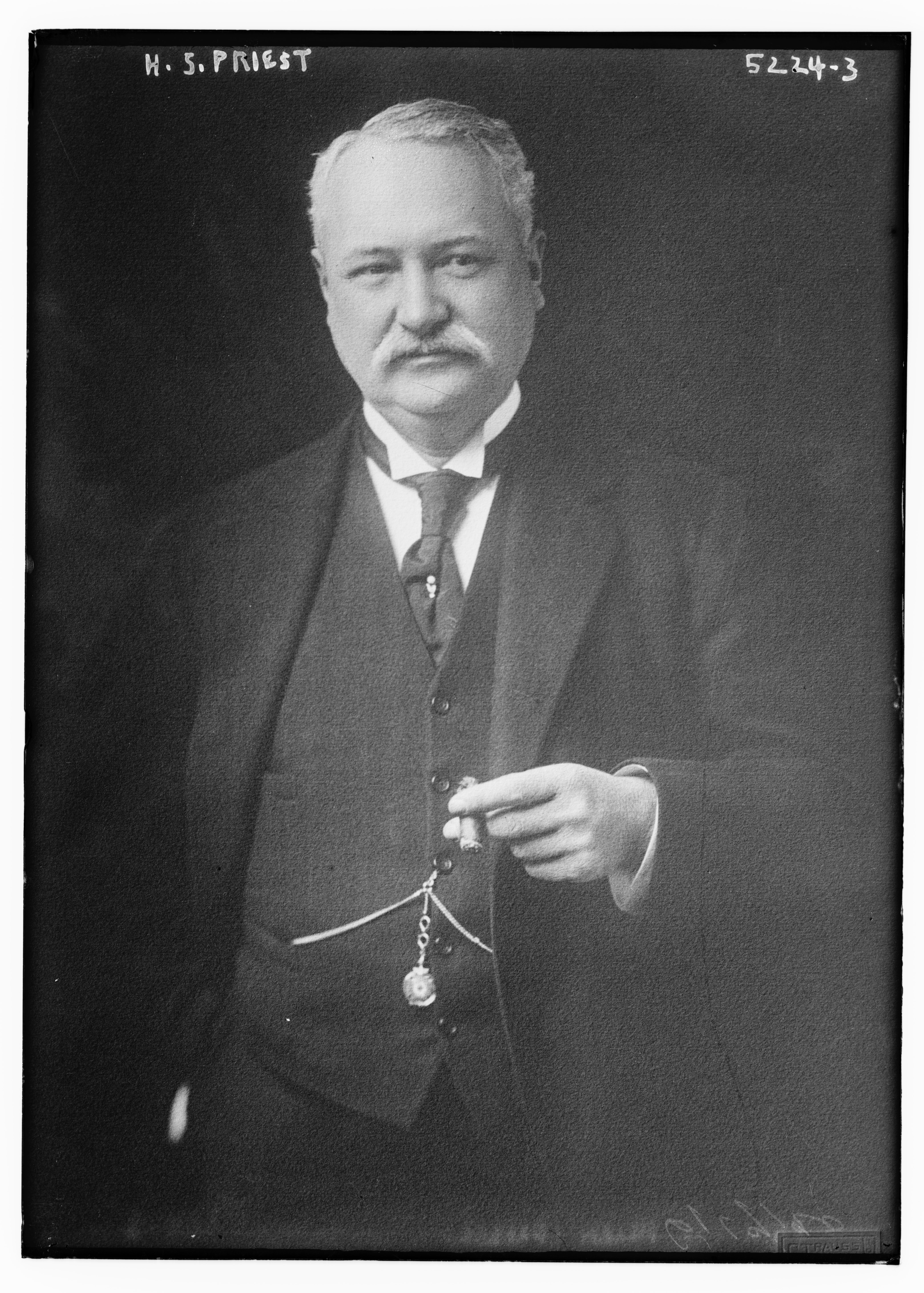

Judge of the United States District Court for the Eastern District of Missouri
- In office August 9, 1894 – May 23, 1895
- Appointed by: Grover Cleveland
- Preceded by: Amos Madden Thayer
- Succeeded by: Elmer B. Adams

Personal details
- Born: Henry Samuel Priest; February 7, 1853 Ralls County, Missouri, U.S.
- Died: July 9, 1930 (aged 77) St. Louis, Missouri, U.S.
- Education: Westminster College (A.B.) read law

Henry Samuel Priest (February 7, 1853 – July 9, 1930) was a United States district judge of the United States District Court for the Eastern District of Missouri.

== Education and career ==
Born in Ralls County, Missouri, Priest received an Artium Baccalaureus degree from Westminster College in 1872. He read law in 1873 and entered private practice in Moberly, Missouri. There he served as city attorney, and was an attorney for the Missouri Pacific Railroad and Wabash Railroad from 1881 to 1894.

== Federal judicial service ==
On August 6, 1894, President Grover Cleveland nominated Priest to the United States District Court for the Eastern District of Missouri, to a seat vacated by Judge Amos Madden Thayer. He was confirmed by the United States Senate on August 9, 1894, and received his commission the same day. Priest served for less than a year, and then resigned on May 23, 1895.

== Later career and death ==
Following his resignation from the federal bench, Priest resumed private practice in St. Louis, Missouri. He was a candidate for the United States Senate from Missouri in 1920, but did not win election. He ran an unsuccessful campaign for Governor of Missouri in 1924. He died in St. Louis on July 9, 1930.

== Sources ==
Legal offices
Preceded by Amos Madden Thayer	Judge of the United States District Court for the Eastern District of Missouri; 1894–1895	Succeeded by Elmer B. Adams
