= List of federal judges appointed by Grover Cleveland =

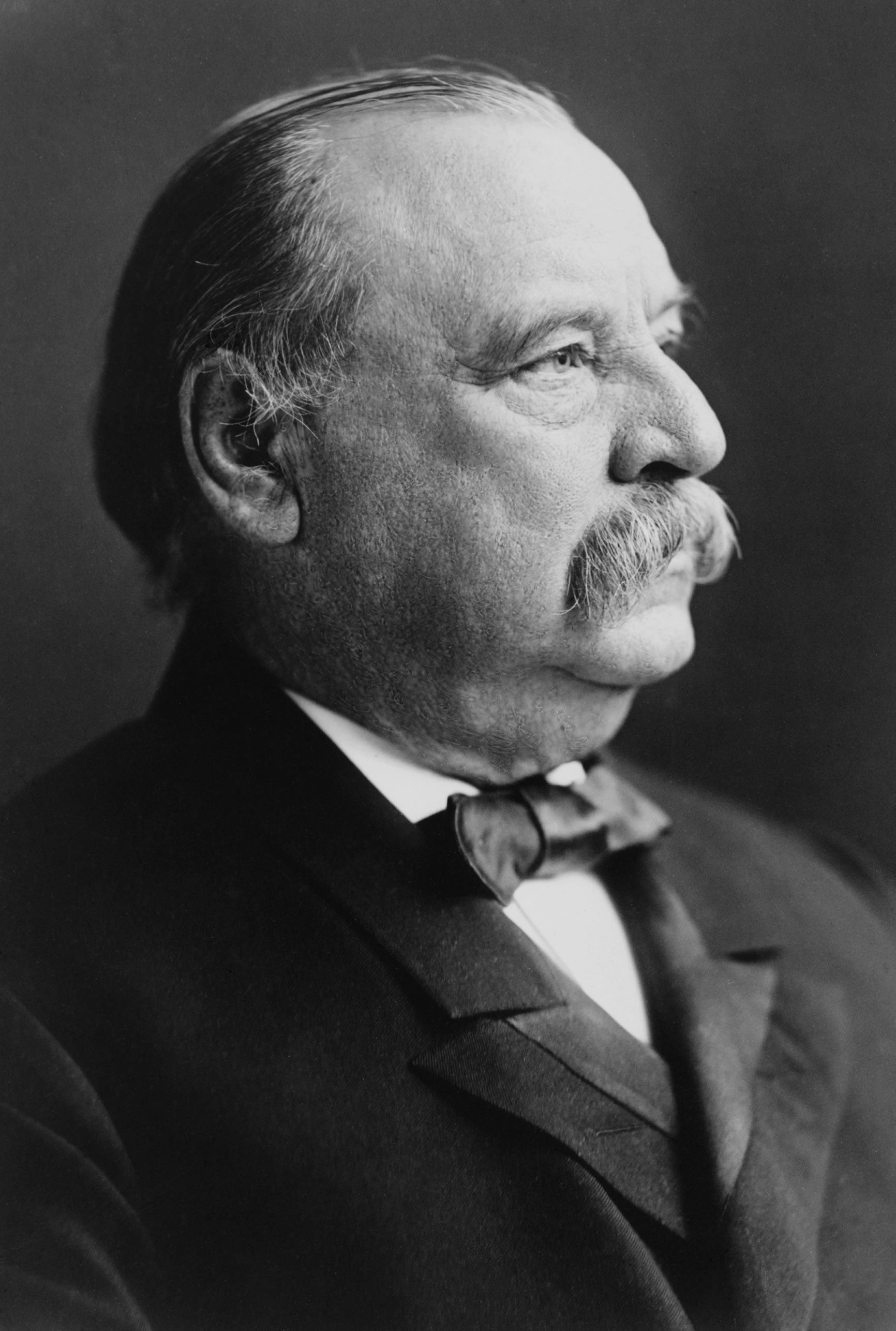
Grover Cleveland

Following is a list of all Article III United States federal judges appointed by President Grover Cleveland during his first and second presidencies. In total Cleveland appointed 45 Article III federal judges, including 4 Justices to the Supreme Court of the United States (including 1 Chief Justice), 11 judges to the United States courts of appeals and United States circuit courts and 30 judges to the United States district courts.

Additionally, Cleveland appointed 2 judges to the United States Court of Claims, an Article I tribunal.

The Judiciary Act of 1891, approved March 3, 1891, during the intervening administration of President Benjamin Harrison, established the United States courts of appeals. Prior to the passage of that act, United States Circuit Judges were appointed solely to the existing United States circuit courts. Subsequent to the passage of that act, United States Circuit Judges were concurrently appointed to both the United States courts of appeals and the United States circuit courts. This situation persisted until the abolition of the United States circuit courts on December 31, 1911. Starting January 1, 1912, United States Circuit Judges served only upon their respective United States court of appeals.

Thus, the 2 United States Circuit Judges appointed during Cleveland's first administration were appointed solely to the United States circuit court for their respective circuit and were reassigned by operation of law to serve concurrently on the United States court of appeals and United States circuit court on March 3, 1891. The 6 United States Circuit Judges appointed to numbered circuits during Cleveland's second administration were appointed concurrently to the United States court of appeals and United States circuit court.

The Court of Appeals for the District of Columbia (now the United States Court of Appeals for the District of Columbia Circuit) was established on February 9, 1893. As the United States Circuit Court for the District of Columbia had been abolished in 1863, the judges of this newly established court served only on the Court of Appeals and had no concurrent Circuit Court service. Cleveland appointed 3 judges to this newly established court during his second administration.

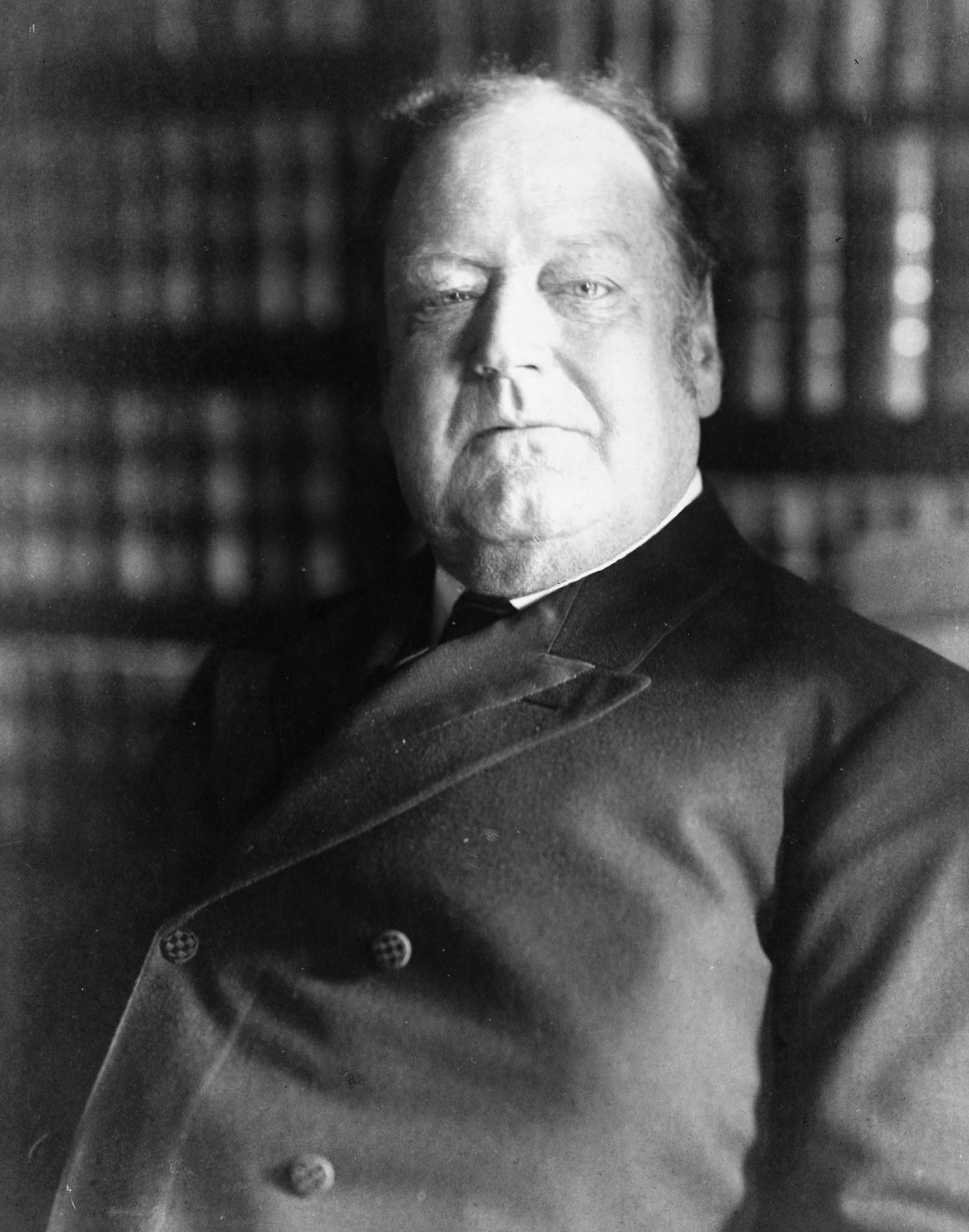
Cleveland appointed Edward Douglass White to be an Associate Justice of the Supreme Court of the United States.

== United States Supreme Court justices ==
=== First administration ===
#	Justice	Seat	State	Former justice	Nomination date	Confirmation date	Began active service	Ended active service
1	Lucius Q. C. Lamar II	3	Mississippi	William Burnham Woods	December 6, 1887	January 16, 1888	January 16, 1888	January 23, 1893
2	Melville Fuller	Chief	Illinois	Morrison Waite	April 30, 1888	July 20, 1888	July 20, 1888	July 4, 1910

=== Second administration ===
#	Justice	Seat	State	Former justice	Nomination date	Confirmation date	Began active service	Ended active service
1	Edward Douglass White	1	Louisiana	Samuel Blatchford	February 19, 1894	February 19, 1894	February 19, 1894	December 19, 1910
2	Rufus W. Peckham	3	New York	Howell Edmunds Jackson	December 3, 1895	December 9, 1895	December 9, 1895	October 24, 1909

== Court of appeals and circuit courts ==
=== First administration ===
#	Judge	Circuit	Nomination date	Confirmation date	Began active service	Ended active service	Ended senior status
1	Howell Edmunds Jackson	Sixth	April 12, 1886	April 12, 1886	April 12, 1886	March 4, 1893	Elevated
2	Emile Henry Lacombe	Second	December 20, 1887 (Note: Originally nominated on December 20, 1887. That nomination was withdrawn on February 27, 1888 and renominated on the same day.)	February 28, 1888	May 26, 1887	December 31, 1911	–

=== Second administration ===
#	Judge	Circuit	Nomination date	Confirmation date	Began active service	Ended active service	Ended senior status
1	James Graham Jenkins	Seventh	March 20, 1893	March 23, 1893	March 23, 1893	February 23, 1905	–
2	Horace Harmon Lurton	Sixth	March 22, 1893	March 27, 1893	March 27, 1893	December 20, 1909	Elevated
3	Richard H. Alvey	D.C.	April 14, 1893	April 15, 1893	April 15, 1893	January 1, 1905	–
4	Martin Ferdinand Morris	D.C.	April 14, 1893	April 15, 1893	April 15, 1893	June 30, 1905	–
5	Seth Shepard	D.C.	April 14, 1893	April 15, 1893	April 15, 1893	January 19, 1905	–
6	Charles Henry Simonton	Fourth	December 11, 1893	December 19, 1893	December 19, 1893	April 25, 1904	–
7	Amos Madden Thayer	Eighth	August 6, 1894	August 9, 1894	August 9, 1894	April 24, 1905	–
8	Erskine Mayo Ross	Ninth	February 19, 1895	February 22, 1895	February 22, 1895	May 31, 1925	December 10, 1928
9	John William Showalter	Seventh	February 25, 1895	March 1, 1895	March 1, 1895	December 10, 1898	–

== District courts ==
=== First administration ===
#	Judge	Court (Note: See List of United States district and territorial courts)	Nomination date	Confirmation date	Began active service	Ended active service	Ended senior status
1	William Matthews Merrick	D.D.C.	December 14, 1885	March 30, 1886	May 1, 1885	February 4, 1889	–
2	Henry Franklin Severens	W.D. Mich.	May 14, 1886	May 25, 1886	May 25, 1886	March 16, 1900	Elevated
3	William Truslow Newman	N.D. Ga.	December 9, 1886	January 13, 1887	August 13, 1886	February 14, 1920	–
4	Charles Henry Simonton	D.S.C.	December 9, 1886	January 13, 1887	September 3, 1886	December 28, 1893	Elevated
5	Erskine Mayo Ross	S.D. Cal.	December 16, 1886	January 13, 1887	January 13, 1887	March 5, 1895	Elevated
6	Harry Theophilus Toulmin	S.D. Ala.	December 13, 1886	January 13, 1887	January 13, 1887	November 12, 1916	–
7	Amos Madden Thayer	E.D. Mo.	February 21, 1887	February 26, 1887	February 26, 1887	August 20, 1894	Elevated
8	Martin V. Montgomery	D.D.C.	December 20, 1887	January 26, 1888	April 1, 1887	October 2, 1892	–
9	William J. Allen	S.D. Ill.	December 20, 1887	January 19, 1888	April 18, 1887	January 26, 1901	–
10	Edward Franklin Bingham	D.D.C.	December 20, 1887	January 23, 1888	April 22, 1887	April 30, 1903	–
11	Thomas Shelton Maxey	W.D. Tex.	June 18, 1888	June 25, 1888	June 25, 1888	December 12, 1916	–
12	John Finis Philips	W.D. Mo.	June 19, 1888	June 25, 1888	June 25, 1888	June 25, 1910	–
13	James Graham Jenkins	E.D. Wis.	June 19, 1888	July 2, 1888	July 2, 1888	March 23, 1893	Elevated

=== Second administration ===
#	Judge	Court	Nomination date	Confirmation date	Began active service	Ended active service	Ended senior status
1	William Henry Seaman	E.D. Wis.	March 27, 1893	April 3, 1893	April 3, 1893	March 1, 1905	Elevated
2	Charles B. Bellinger	D. Ore.	April 11, 1893	April 15, 1893	April 15, 1893	May 12, 1905	–
3	Charles Parlange	E.D. La.	December 11, 1893	January 15, 1894	January 15, 1894	February 4, 1907	–
4	William H. Brawley	D.S.C.	December 20, 1893	January 18, 1894	January 18, 1894	June 14, 1911	–
5	Henry Samuel Priest	E.D. Mo.	August 6, 1894	August 9, 1894	August 9, 1894	May 23, 1895	–
6	Charles Dickens Clark	E.D. Tenn. M.D. Tenn.	December 17, 1894	January 21, 1895	January 21, 1895	March 15, 1908	–
7	Olin Wellborn	S.D. Cal.	February 25, 1895	March 1, 1895	March 1, 1895	January 31, 1915	–
8	Elmer B. Adams	E.D. Mo.	December 4, 1895	December 9, 1895	May 17, 1895	May 29, 1905	Elevated
9	John Augustine Marshall	D. Utah	January 13, 1896	February 4, 1896	February 4, 1896	September 8, 1915	–
10	William Lochren	D. Minn.	May 15, 1896	May 18, 1896	May 18, 1896	July 11, 1908	–
11	John Emmett Carland	D.S.D.	December 8, 1896	December 15, 1896	August 31, 1896	February 6, 1911	Elevated
12	Charles F. Amidon	D.N.D.	December 8, 1896	February 18, 1897	August 31, 1896	June 2, 1928	December 26, 1937
13	Arthur Lewis Brown	D.R.I.	December 8, 1896	December 15, 1896	October 15, 1896	June 30, 1927	–
14	Andrew Kirkpatrick	D.N.J.	December 8, 1896	December 15, 1896	November 20, 1896	May 3, 1904	–
15	William Douglas McHugh	D. Neb.	December 8, 1896	–	November 20, 1896	March 3, 1897	–
16	John Henry Rogers	W.D. Ark.	December 8, 1896	December 15, 1896	November 27, 1896	April 16, 1911	–
17	William Henry Munger	D. Neb.	February 1, 1897	February 18, 1897	February 18, 1897	August 11, 1915	–

== Specialty courts ==
=== United States Court of Claims ===
#	Judge	Nomination date	Confirmation date	Began active service	Ended active service
1	Charles C. Nott	December 8, 1896	December 15, 1896	November 23, 1896	December 31, 1905
2	Charles Bowen Howry	December 8, 1896	January 28, 1897	November 23, 1896	March 6, 1915

== Notes ==
Renominations

== Sources ==
- Federal Judicial Center
