= Amos Madden Thayer =

American judge (1841–1905)

Judge of the United States Court of Appeals for the Eighth Circuit
- In office August 9, 1894 – April 24, 1905
- Appointed by: Grover Cleveland
- Preceded by: Seat established by 28 Stat. 115
- Succeeded by: Elmer B. Adams

Judge of the United States Circuit Courts for the Eighth Circuit
- In office August 9, 1894 – April 24, 1905
- Appointed by: Grover Cleveland
- Preceded by: Seat established by 28 Stat. 115
- Succeeded by: Elmer B. Adams

Judge of the United States District Court for the Eastern District of Missouri
- In office February 26, 1887 – August 20, 1894
- Appointed by: Grover Cleveland
- Preceded by: Samuel Treat
- Succeeded by: Henry Samuel Priest

Personal details
- Born: Amos Madden Thayer; October 10, 1841 Mina, New York, U.S.
- Died: April 24, 1905 (aged 63) St. Louis, Missouri, U.S.
- Education: Hamilton College read law

Amos Madden Thayer (October 10, 1841 – April 24, 1905) was a United States circuit judge of the United States Court of Appeals for the Eighth Circuit and of the United States Circuit Courts for the Eighth Circuit and previously was a United States district judge of the United States District Court for the Eastern District of Missouri.

== Education and career ==
Born in Mina, New York, Thayer graduated from Hamilton College in 1862 and then joined the United States Army, serving as a major from 1862 to 1865. He read law in 1868 and went into private practice in the Montana Territory, then in St. Louis, Missouri. He became a Judge of the Circuit Courts of Missouri for the St. Louis Circuit from 1876 to 1887.

== Federal judicial service ==
Thayer was nominated by President Grover Cleveland on February 21, 1887, to a seat on the United States District Court for the Eastern District of Missouri vacated by Judge Samuel Treat. He was confirmed by the United States Senate on February 26, 1887, and received his commission the same day. His service terminated on August 20, 1894, due to his elevation to the Eighth Circuit.

Thayer was nominated by President Cleveland on August 6, 1894, to the United States Court of Appeals for the Eighth Circuit and the United States Circuit Courts for the Eighth Circuit, to a new joint seat authorized by 28 Stat. 115. He was confirmed by the Senate on August 9, 1894, and received his commission the same day. His service terminated on April 24, 1905, due to his death in St. Louis.

=== Other service ===
Concurrent with his federal judicial service, Thayer was a professor at the School of Law at Washington University in St. Louis, starting in 1890.

== Sources ==
Legal offices
Preceded by Samuel Treat	Judge of the United States District Court for the Eastern District of Missouri; 1887–1894	Succeeded by Henry Samuel Priest
Preceded by Seat established by 28 Stat. 115	Judge of the United States Circuit Courts for the Eighth Circuit; 1894–1905	Succeeded by Elmer B. Adams
Preceded by Seat established by 28 Stat. 115	Judge of the United States Court of Appeals for the Eighth Circuit; 1894–1905	Succeeded by Elmer B. Adams
