= New Orleans, Opelousas and Great Western Railroad =

Former railway company in Louisiana, US

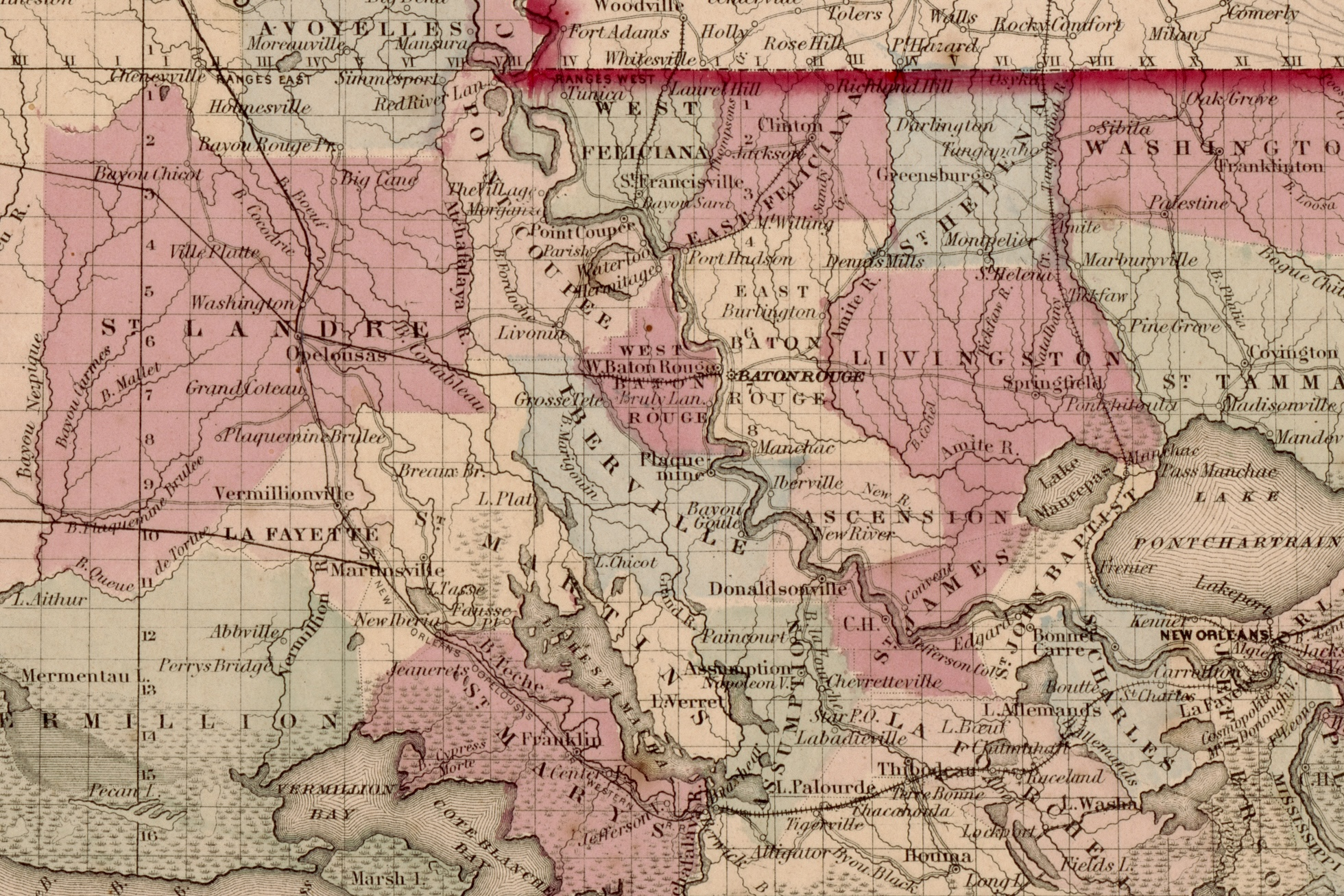
- New Orleans Oppelousas & Gr. Western R.R. ("Colton's Louisiana," 1856)

Overview
- Headquarters: New Orleans, Louisiana
- Locale: Louisiana
- Dates of operation: 1854–1869

Technical
- Track gauge: 4 ft 8 1/2 in (1,435 mm) standard gauge
- Previous gauge: originally 5 ft 6 in (1,676 mm)

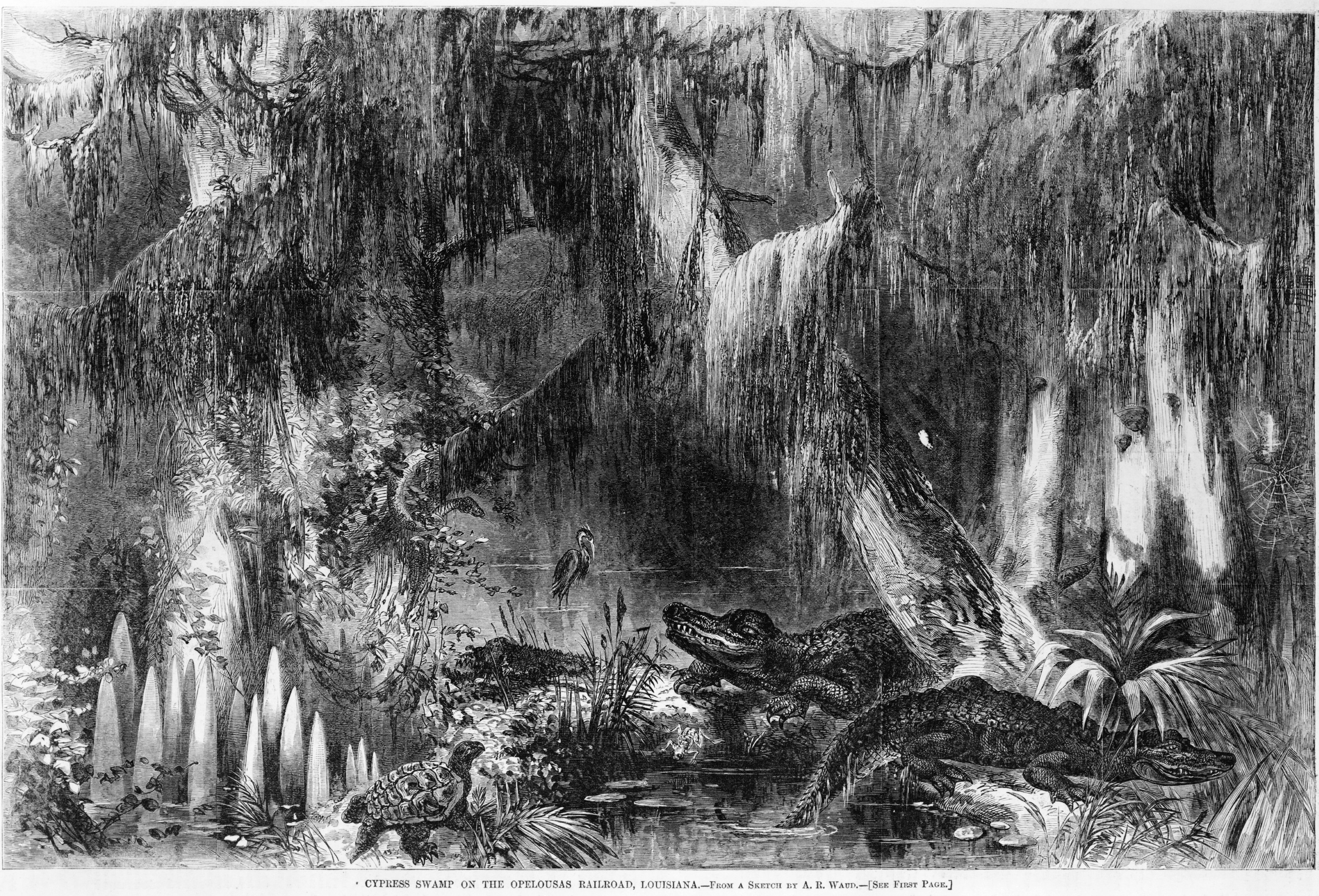
Cypress swamp on the Opelousas Railroad, Louisiana - from a sketch by A.R. Waud, 1866

The New Orleans, Opelousas and Great Western Railroad (NOO&GW) was chartered in 1852. Construction began at Algiers, across the Mississippi River from New Orleans, in late 1852. By 1857, the track had reached Brashear (now Morgan City) on Berwick Bay, and this remained the end of the line for over 20 years. The 83 miles (134 km) NOO&GW was built to the "Texas gauge" of 5 ft 6 in (1,676 mm), the only such railroad in the New Orleans area to use that gauge; the line was converted to 4 ft 8 1/2 in (1,435 mm) standard gauge in 1872.

In 1869, steamship operator Charles Morgan bought the NOO&GW and began operating it as owner. In 1878 he organized his railroad property as Morgan's Louisiana and Texas Railroad and Steamship Company, and it eventually became part of the Southern Pacific Company's main line. The line is currently owned and operated by BNSF.

== Leadership ==
From the establishment of the company in 1852 until 1862, Benjamin Flanders (later Reconstruction Governor of Louisiana and Mayor of New Orleans) was the Secretary and Treasurer of the line. In 1869, the company was bought by Charles Morgan.

== History ==
Planning for the railroad began in 1851. The company was organized as the New Orleans, Opelousas and Great Western Railroad company to run 172 miles (277 km) from Algiers to Washington and Opelousas. The start date was likely October 1852 with an optimistic completion date set for January 1855. Bad weather, heavy rains, periodic flooding, and a yellow fever epidemic delayed the rail reaching Boutte in late 1853 and another six months to reach Des Allemands. A bridge 475 feet (145 m) was required to cross Bayou Des Allemands. When the rail did not reach Lafourche Crossing until November 1854 it was already clear the completion date was overly optimistic. A 10 mile stretch of land referred to as "trembling prairie" meant piling and trestles had to be used on the rail bed almost the entire distance. At Bayou Lafourche a unique 260 feet (79 m) draw bridge had to be constructed.
