= John S. Rhea =

American politician (1855–1924)

John Stockdale Rhea (March 9, 1855 – July 29, 1924) was a U.S. representative from Kentucky.

Born in Russellville, Kentucky, Rhea pursued preparatory studies. He attended Bethel College, Russellville, Kentucky, and Washington and Lee University, Lexington, Virginia. He studied law. He was admitted to the bar and commenced practice in 1873. He served as prosecuting attorney for Logan County in 1878 and 1882. He served as presidential elector on the Democratic ticket in 1884 and 1888. He served as delegate to the Democratic National Conventions in 1892 and 1896.

Rhea was elected as a Democrat to the Fifty-fifth and Fifty-sixth Congresses (March 4, 1897 – March 3, 1901). Presented credentials as a Member-elect to the Fifty-seventh Congress and served from March 4, 1901, to March 25, 1902, when he was succeeded by J. McKenzie Moss, who contested his election.

Rhea was elected to the Fifty-eighth Congress (March 4, 1903 – March 3, 1905). He was not a candidate for renomination in 1904. He resumed the practice of his profession in Russellville. He was appointed circuit court judge in 1913 and subsequently elected in 1915 and served until January 1, 1922. He died in Russellville, Kentucky, on July 29, 1924. He was interred in Maple Grove Cemetery.

U.S. House of Representatives
| Preceded by W. Godfrey Hunter | United States Representative, Kentucky's 3rd district March 4, 1897 – March 25, 1902 | Succeeded by J. McKenzie Moss |
| Preceded by J. McKenzie Moss | United States Representative, Kentucky's 3rd district March 4, 1903 – March 3, 1905 | Succeeded by James M. Richardson |
