= George Grundy Dunn =

American politician and lawyer

Member of the U.S. House of Representatives from Indiana
- In office March 4, 1855 – March 3, 1857
- Preceded by: Cyrus L. Dunham
- Succeeded by: James Hughes
- Constituency: 3rd district
- In office March 4, 1847 – March 3, 1849
- Preceded by: John W. Davis
- Succeeded by: Willis A. Gorman
- Constituency: 6th district

Member of the Indiana Senate
- In office 1850–1852

Personal details
- Born: December 20, 1812 Washington County, Kentucky, US
- Died: September 4, 1857 (aged 44) Bedford, Indiana, US
- Party: People's Party (1855–1857)
- Other political affiliations: Whig (before 1854)
- Education: Indiana University

George Grundy Dunn (December 20, 1812 – September 4, 1857) was an American lawyer and politician who served two nonconsecutive terms as a U.S. representative from Indiana, from 1847 to 1849 and again from 1855 to 1857.

== Early life and education ==
George Grundy Dunn was born in Washington County, Kentucky on December 20, 1812, to Samuel and Elizabeth Grundy Dunn. In 1823, his family moved to Monroe County, Indiana. He completed preparatory studies and attended Indiana Seminary which is now known as Indiana University in Bloomington. Due to a dispute with a professor, Dunn left the school in his third year.

== Career ==
In 1833, Dunn moved to Switzerland County, Indiana to teach school. He later moved to Bedford, Indiana to study law. Dunn was admitted to the bar in 1835 and partnered with Richard W. Thompson to practice law in Bedford. In 1842, he became the prosecuting attorney of Lawrence County, Indiana.

=== Politics ===
Dunn served in several political offices. He was well known for his passionate oratory skills. Dunn was elected as a Whig to the Thirtieth Congress (March 4, 1847 – March 3, 1849). He was an unsuccessful candidate for reelection in 1848.

Dunn served in the Indiana Senate from 1850 until 1852, when he resigned to oversee his law practice.

=== Position on slavery ===
An opponent of slavery, Dunn was drawn back into politics after the passage of the Kansas-Nebraska Act which expanded slavery. Dunn was elected as an Indiana People's Party candidate to the Thirty-fourth Congress (March 4, 1855 – March 3, 1857). He was in poor health for much of his term and did not seek renomination in 1856.

== Marriage and family ==
In 1841, Dunn married Julia Fell. They had four children: Moses Fell Dunn (1842–1915), Samuel Dunn (1844–1845), Julia M Dunn (1845–1845), and George Grundy Dunn (1846–1891).

== Death ==
Dunn died in Bedford, Indiana, on September 4, 1857.

U.S. House of Representatives
| Preceded by John Wesley Davis | Member of the U.S. House of Representatives from Indiana's 6th congressional district 1847-1849 | Succeeded by Willis A. Gorman |
| Preceded by Cyrus L. Dunham | Member of the U.S. House of Representatives from Indiana's 3rd congressional district 1855-1857 | Succeeded by James Hughes |
