= Samuel Treat =

American judge (1815–1902)

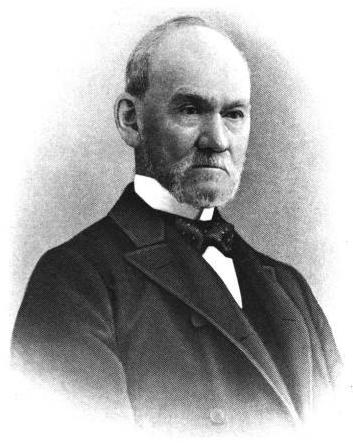

Judge of the United States District Court for the Eastern District of Missouri
- In office March 3, 1857 – March 5, 1887
- Appointed by: Franklin Pierce
- Preceded by: Seat established by 11 Stat. 197
- Succeeded by: Amos Madden Thayer

Personal details
- Born: Samuel Treat; December 17, 1815 Portsmouth, New Hampshire
- Died: August 31, 1902 (aged 86) Rochester, New York
- Education: Harvard University (B.A., M.A.) read law

Samuel Treat (December 17, 1815 – August 31, 1902) was a United States district judge of the United States District Court for the Eastern District of Missouri.

== Education and career ==
Born on December 17, 1815, in Portsmouth, New Hampshire, Treat was educated at the public high school in his native town, from whence he graduated at age 16 and thereafter served as an assistant teacher for the year following his graduation. He received a Bachelor of Arts degree in 1837 from Harvard University and a Master of Arts degree in 1840 from the same institution. He was the first example in New England of a student who entered Harvard University directly from a public school, without having passed through an intermediate training school. In 1838, he commenced the study of the law in the offices of Jeremiah Mason and Charles B. Goodrich, the former the contemporary of Parsons, Story and Webster. During the time of pursuing his legal studies, Treat also taught as a professor in the Weld school at Jamaica Plain, near Boston, Massachusetts. While at the Weld school he was elected to take charge of the Temple Hill Academy in the Genesee Valley, New York, and there he continued his legal studies under Governor John Young. In November 1840, he resigned his position as principal of the academy in order to devote more time to his legal studies. He resided in Geneseo, New York for three years, and married his wife there. He completed his studies and read law in 1841. He entered private practice in St. Louis, Missouri from 1841 to 1849, after being examined and admitted to the bar by Judge Mullanphy. He was editor of the St. Louis Union from 1841 to 1849. He spent the winter of 1848 in Cuba on account of his ill health. He was a Judge of the St. Louis Court of Common Pleas from 1849 to 1857. In 1853, Treat was chosen to lead a task force to help name what is now Washington University in St. Louis.

== Federal judicial service ==
Treat was nominated by President Franklin Pierce on March 3, 1857, to the United States District Court for the Eastern District of Missouri, to a new seat authorized by 11 Stat. 197. He was confirmed by the United States Senate on March 3, 1857, and received his commission the same day. His service terminated on March 5, 1887, due to his retirement.

=== Other service ===
Concurrent with his federal judicial service, Treat was a Professor of admiralty law for Washington University School of Law from 1867 to 1887.

== Death ==
Treat died on August 31, 1902, in Rochester, New York.

== Sources ==
Legal offices
Preceded by Seat established by 11 Stat. 197	Judge of the United States District Court for the Eastern District of Missouri; 1857–1887	Succeeded by Amos Madden Thayer
