= George Eddy Downey =

American judge (1860–1926)

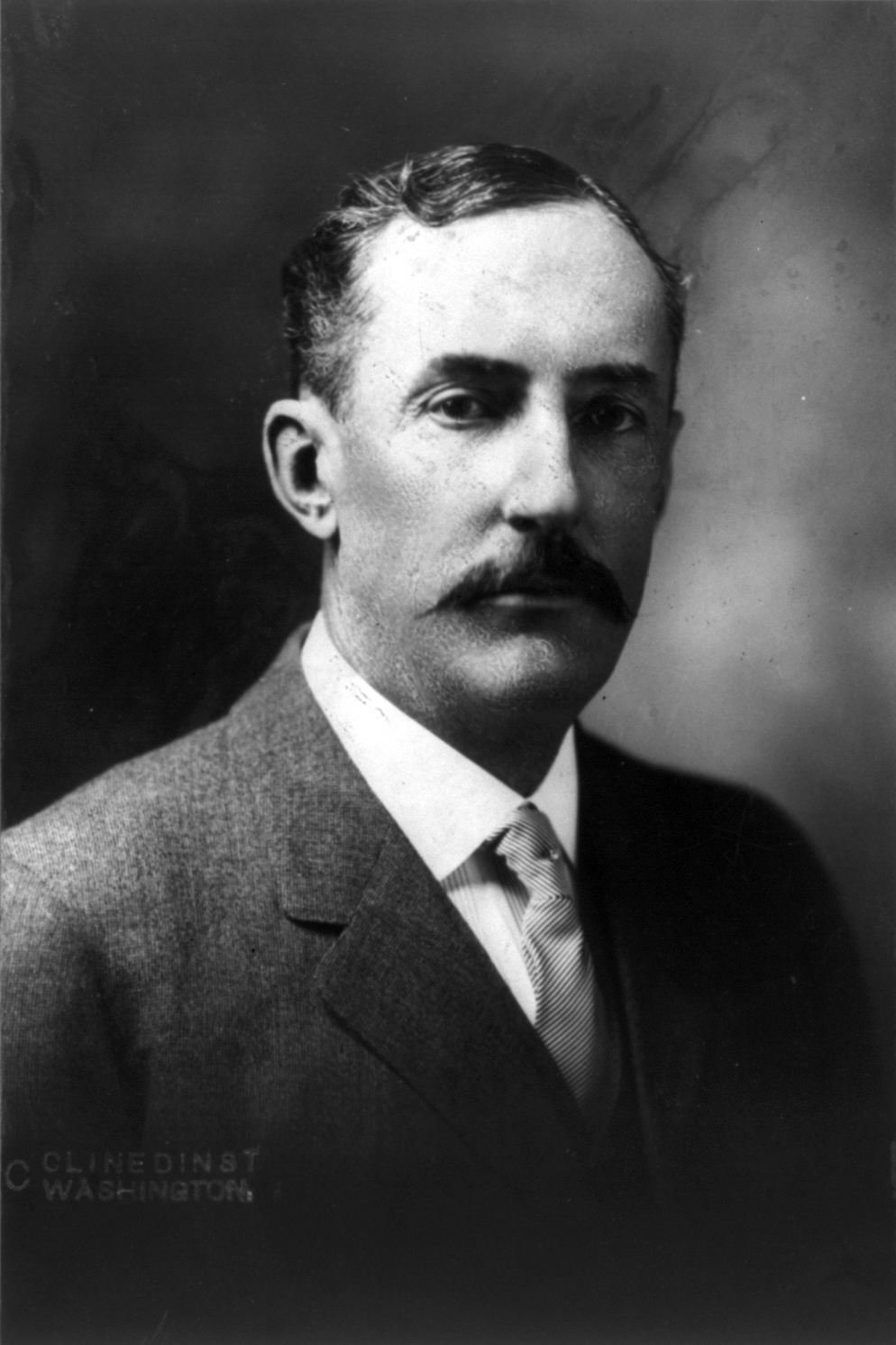

Judge of the Court of Claims
- In office August 3, 1915 – May 24, 1926
- Appointed by: Woodrow Wilson
- Preceded by: Charles Bowen Howry
- Succeeded by: J. McKenzie Moss

Personal details
- Born: George Eddy Downey; July 11, 1860 Rising Sun, Indiana, U.S.
- Died: May 24, 1926 (aged 65) Washington, D.C., U.S.
- Education: DePauw University (B.A., M.A.)

George Eddy Downey (July 11, 1860 – May 24, 1926) was an Indiana attorney, mayor and judge, and later a judge of the Court of Claims.

== Education and career ==
Born in Rising Sun, Indiana, Downey received a Bachelor of Arts degree from Indiana Asbury University (now DePauw University) in 1880, and a Master of Arts degree from the same institution in 1883. He practiced law in Rising Sun from 1881 to 1882, then took a position as the editor of the Franklin Democrat newspaper in Brookville, Indiana. After serving as editor from 1882 to 1884, he returned to his practice in Rising Sun. He moved to Aurora, Indiana in 1886 and was elected mayor of the town in 1894. He served several terms as mayor, leaving office in 1902. The following year, he was named a Judge of the Seventh Judicial Circuit of Indiana, where he served until 1913. President Woodrow Wilson appointed him Comptroller of the United States Department of the Treasury in 1913. He resigned in 1915.

== Federal judicial service ==
Downey received a recess appointment from President Woodrow Wilson on August 3, 1915, to a seat on the Court of Claims (later the United States Court of Claims) vacated by Judge Charles Bowen Howry. He was nominated to the same position by President Wilson on January 7, 1916. He was confirmed by the United States Senate on January 17, 1916, and received his commission the same day. His service terminated on May 24, 1926, due to his death in Washington, D.C.

Legal offices
Preceded by Charles Bowen Howry	Judge of the Court of Claims; 1915–1926	Succeeded by J. McKenzie Moss
