= Charles Bowen Howry =

American politician (1844–1928)

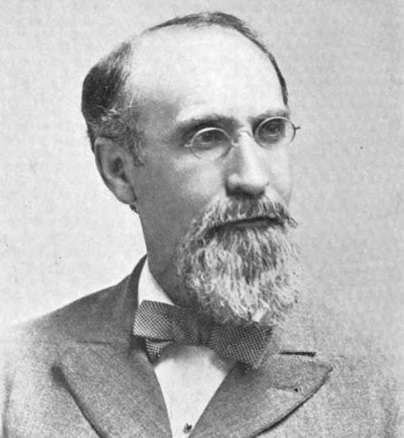
- From October 1895's The Record of Sigma Alpha Epsilon

Judge of the Court of Claims
- In office November 23, 1896 – March 6, 1915
- Appointed by: Grover Cleveland
- Preceded by: Charles C. Nott
- Succeeded by: George Eddy Downey

Personal details
- Born: Charles Bowen Howry; May 14, 1844 Oxford, Mississippi, U.S.
- Died: July 20, 1928 (aged 84) Washington, D.C., U.S.
- Resting place: Oxford Memorial Cemetery; Oxford, Mississippi
- Party: Democratic
- Education: University of Mississippi School of Law (LL.B.)

Military service
- Allegiance: Confederate States of America
- Branch/service: Confederate States Army
- Years of service: 1862–1865
- Rank: Captain
- Unit: 29th Mississippi Infantry Regiment
- Battles/wars: American Civil War: Chickamauga; Lookout Mountain; Missionary Ridge; Resaca; New Hope Church; Peachtree Creek; Atlanta; Jonesborough; Franklin

Charles Bowen Howry (May 14, 1844 – July 20, 1928) was a Mississippi attorney and politician. He was a veteran of the Confederate States Army, a member of the Mississippi House of Representatives, United States Attorney for the Northern District of Mississippi and a judge of the Court of Claims.

== Early life and military service ==
Howry was born on May 14, 1844, in Oxford, Mississippi, the son of James M. Howry and Narcissa (Bowen) Howry. He received his early education in Oxford and began studies at the University of Mississippi, but left college to serve in the American Civil War. Howry joined the Confederate States Army's 29th Mississippi Infantry Regiment as a private. He later received a commission, and attained the rank of captain. Howry's combat experience included the Battles of Chickamauga, Lookout Mountain, Missionary Ridge, Resaca, New Hope Church, Peachtree Creek, Atlanta, Jonesborough, and Franklin. Howry was wounded at the Battle of Franklin, and remained in the military until the end of the war. After the war, Howry was a longtime member of the United Confederate Veterans. He served in several leadership roles, including commander of the Army of Northern Virginia department with the rank of lieutenant general.

== Education and career ==
After the war, Howry studied law with Lucius Quintus Cincinnatus Lamar II, and then returned to the University of Mississippi School of Law, from which he received a Bachelor of Laws degree in 1867. Howry was admitted to the bar later that year, and entered private practice in Oxford. He was a trustee of the university from 1882 to 1894, and in 1896 the university awarded him the honorary degree of LL.D. In addition to practicing in Oxford, Howry was active in politics as a Democrat, and was elected to a term as prosecuting attorney of Lafayette County, Mississippi in 1869. He was a member of the Mississippi House of Representatives from 1880 to 1884. From 1885 to 1889, Howry was the United States Attorney for the Northern District of Mississippi. Howry was a longtime member of the Mississippi Democratic Party's executive committee, and he was a member of the Democratic National Committee from 1891 to 1896. From 1891 to 1892, Howry was a vice president of the American Bar Association. He was a United States Assistant Attorney General for the United States Department of Justice in Washington, D.C., from 1893 to 1897.

== Federal judicial service ==
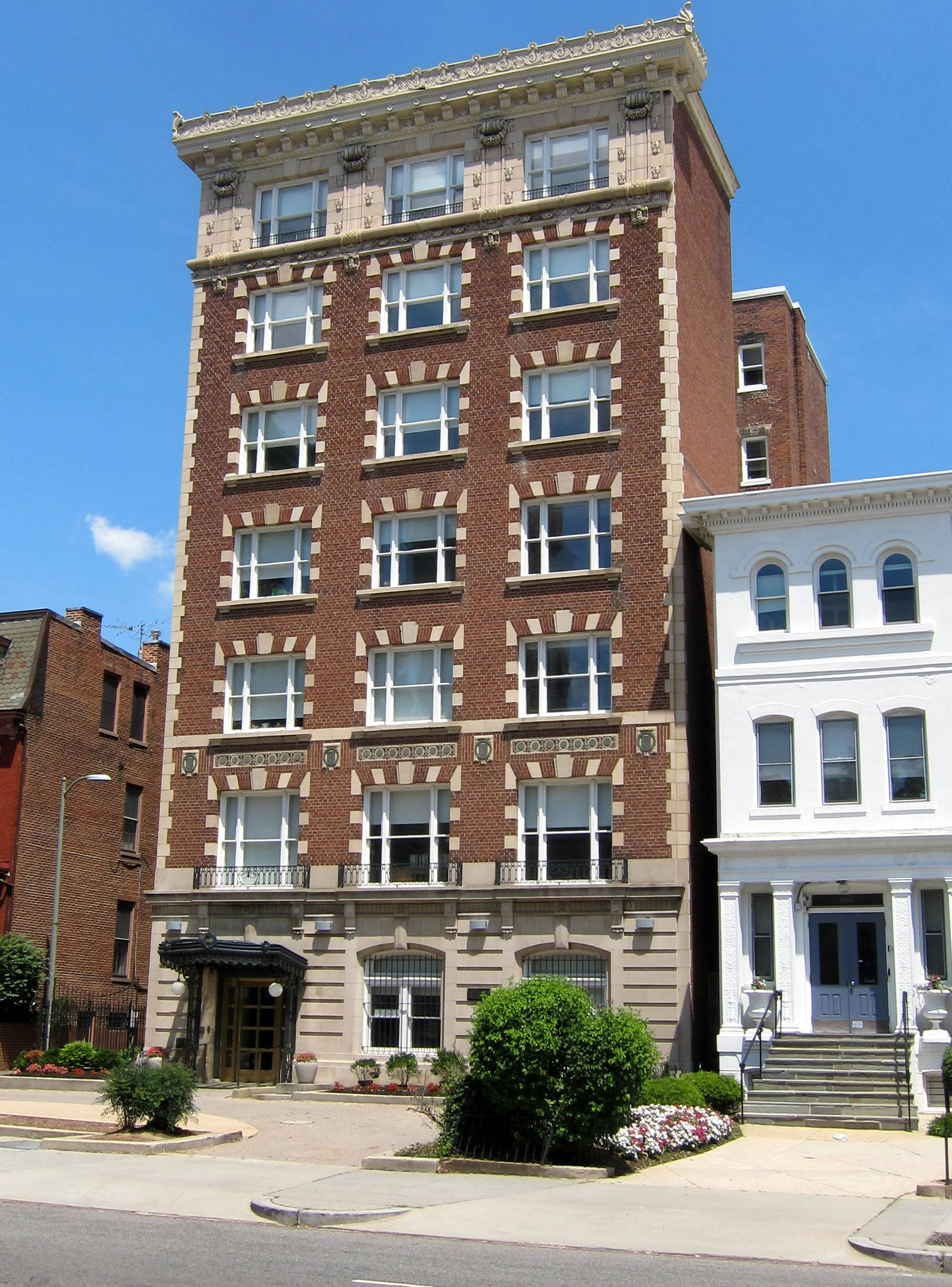
Howry's former residence in Washington, D.C.

Howry received a recess appointment from President Grover Cleveland on November 23, 1896, to a Judge seat on the Court of Claims (later the United States Court of Claims) vacated by Judge Charles C. Nott. He was nominated to the same position by President Cleveland on December 8, 1896. He was confirmed by the United States Senate on January 28, 1897, and received his commission the same day. His service terminated on March 6, 1915, due to his resignation. He was succeeded by Judge George Eddy Downey.

=== Judicial philosophy and notable opinions ===
While on the court, Howry became known for his ability to apply the historical precedents of Anglo-American common law to his decisions and written opinions. His notable opinions included the decisions in the French Spoliation Claims, Ayres v. United States and Lincoln v. United States.

=== Declined consideration for promotion ===
President Woodrow Wilson offered to appoint Howry as Chief Justice, which he declined because of Wilson's condition that if he accepted, Howry would retire on reaching age 70 in 1914.

== Later career ==
Following his resignation from the federal bench, Howry resumed private practice in Washington, D.C. Additionally, he was Chairman of the federal railroad Board of Arbitration in 1916, and special counsel to the United States Department of Labor from 1918 to 1919.

== Death and burial ==
Howry died in Washington, D.C. of heart failure on July 20, 1928. He was buried at Oxford Memorial Cemetery.

== Family ==
In 1869, Howry married Edmonia Beverley Carter of Virginia. She died in 1879, and they were the parents of two sons, Lucien Beverley Howry and Willard Carter Howry, and a daughter, Maude. Howry remarried in 1880, becoming the husband of Harriet (Hallie) Holt of Columbus, Mississippi. They had four children—Charles Jr., Hallie, Elizabeth, and Mary. The second Mrs. Howry died in 1898. In 1900, Howry married Sallie Bird Smith (d. 1942), the widow of Buckingham Smith.

== Sources ==
=== Magazines ===
- Sigma Alpha Epsilon Fraternity (October 1895). "Five Representative Sigs: Charles Bowen Howry". The Record of Sigma Alpha Epsilon. Vol. XV, no. 3. Lynn, MA: The Nichols Press.
- Small, Arthur Everett (December 30, 1916). "The Award of the Federal Board of Arbitration in the Wage Controversy Between Railroads and Switchmen". The Economic World. New York, NY: The Chronicle Company.
- Howry, Charles B. (March 1924). "Department of the Army of Northern Virginia, U.C.V." Confederate Veteran. Vol. XXXII, no. 3. Nashville, TN: Trustees of the Confederate Veteran.

=== Books ===
- Distinguished Successful Americans of Our Day. Chicago, IL: Successful Americans. 1911.
- Bicentennial Committee of the Judicial Conference of the United States (1983). Judges of the United States (2 ed.). Washington, DC: US Government Printing Office.
- Capace, Nancy (2000). Encyclopedia of Mississippi. Santa Barbara, CA: Somerset Publishers, Inc. ISBN 978-0-403-09603-9.
- U.S. Congress Joint Committee on Printing (1914). Official Congressional Directory. Washington, DC: US Government Printing Office.
- White, James Terry (1932). The National Cyclopedia of American Biography. New York, NY: James T. White and Company.

=== Newspapers ===
- "Judge C. B. Howry Buried at Oxford". The Clarion-Ledger. Jackson, MS. July 24, 1928 – via Newspapers.com.

Legal offices
Preceded by Charles C. Nott	Judge of the Court of Claims; 1896–1915	Succeeded by George Eddy Downey
