= 131st New York Infantry Regiment =

- Active: July 12, 1862 – July 26, 1865
- Country: United States
- Allegiance: Union
- Branch: Infantry
- Engagements: Bayou Teche Campaign: Battle of Vermilion Bayou; Siege of Port Hudson; Red River Campaign; Bermuda Hundred Campaign; First Battle of Deep Bottom; Third Battle of Winchester; Battle of Fisher's Hill; Battle of Cedar Creek

The 131st New York Infantry Regiment (a.k.a. "1st Regiment Metropolitan Guard") was an infantry regiment in the Union Army during the American Civil War.

== Service ==
The 131st New York Infantry was organized at New York City, New York beginning July 10, 1862, and mustered in for three-years service on September 6, 1862, under the command of Colonel Charles S. Turnbull.

The regiment was attached to District of Annapolis, Maryland, VIII Corps, Middle Department, to December 1862. Grover's Division, Department of the Gulf, to January 1863. 1st Brigade, 4th Division, XIX Corps, Department of the Gulf, to February 1864. 2nd Brigade, 2nd Division, XIX Corps, Department of the Gulf, to July 1864, and Army of the Shenandoah, Middle Military Division, to January 1865. 2nd Brigade, Grover's Division, District of Savannah, Department of the South, to March 1865. 1st Brigade, 1st Division, X Corps, Army of the Ohio, Department of North Carolina, to April 1865. District of Savannah, Department of the South, to July 1865.

The 131st New York Infantry mustered out of service July 26, 1865 at Savannah, Georgia.

== Detailed service ==
Left New York for Annapolis, Maryland, September 14, 1862. Duty at Annapolis, Maryland, until November 18, 1862. Ordered to New Orleans, Louisiana, November 18; then moved to Baton Rouge, Louisiana, December, and duty there until March 1863. Operations against Port Hudson March 7–27. Moved to Donaldsonville March 27, then to Brashear City, Louisiana Operations in Western Louisiana April 9 – May 14. Bayou Teche Campaign, April 11–20. Fort Bisland, April 12–13. Madam Porter's Plantation, Indian Bend, April 13. Irish Bend, April 14. Bayou Vermilion, April 17. March to Opelousas, April 19–20. Moved to New Iberia, April 25. Siege of Port Hudson, May 24 – July 9. Assaults on Port Hudson, May 27 and June 14. Action at Plaquemine, June 18 (detachment). Surrender of Port Hudson, July 9. Kock's Plantation, Bayou LaFourche, July 12–13. Duty at Thibodeauxville until March 1864. Expedition from Brashear City, February 3–6, 1864 (detachment). Red River Campaign, March 25 – May 22. Alexandria, May 1. Construction of dam at Alexandria, April 30 – May 10. Retreat to Mansura, May 13–20. Mansura, May 16. Duty at Morganza until July 3. Moved to New Orleans, Louisiana, then to Fort Monroe, Virginia, and to Bermuda Hundred, Virginia, July 3–22. In the trenches at Bermuda Hundred, Virginia, until July 28. Deep Bottom, July 28–29. Moved to Washington, D.C., then to Tennallytown, July 31 – August 2. Sheridan's Shenandoah Valley Campaign, August 7 – November 28. Battle of Winchester, September 19. Fisher's Hill, September 22. Battle of Cedar Creek, October 19. Duty at Kernstown and Winchester until January 1865. Moved to Savannah, Georgia, January 5–22, and duty there until March. At Morehead City and New Bern, North Carolina, until April. At Savannah, Georgia, until July.

== Casualties ==
The regiment lost a total of 194 men during service; two officers and 82 enlisted men killed or mortally wounded, three officers and 107 enlisted men died of disease.

== Commanders ==
- Colonel Charles S. Turnbull
- Colonel Nicholas W. Day

== See also ==
- List of New York Civil War regiments
- New York in the Civil War
