= Lafourche Crossing, Louisiana =

- Census-designated place
- Location within Louisiana Location within the United States
- Coordinates: 29°46′02″N 90°45′57″W
- Country: United States
- State: Louisiana
- Parish: Lafourche

Area
  - Total: 4.21 sq mi (10.90 km^{2})
  - Land: 4.21 sq mi (10.90 km^{2})
  - Water: 0 sq mi (0.00 km^{2})
- Elevation: 13 ft (4.0 m)

Population (2020)
  - Total: 2,427
  - Density: 576.5/sq mi (222.58/km^{2})
- Time zone: UTC-6 (Central (CST))
  - Summer (DST): UTC-5 (CDT)
- ZIP code: 70301
- Area code: 985
- GNIS feature ID: 554967

Lafourche Crossing (also known as Lafourche) is an unincorporated community and census-designated place in Lafourche Parish, Louisiana, United States. As of the 2020 census, Lafourche Crossing had a population of 2,427. Louisiana Highway 1 passes through the community.

== Geography ==
According to the U.S. Census Bureau, the community has an area of 4.210 square miles (10.90 km^{2}), all land.

== Demographics ==
Historical population
Census	Pop.	Note	%±
2010	2,002		—
2020	2,427		21.2%
U.S. Decennial Census

Lafourche Crossing was first listed as a census designated place in the 2010 U.S. census.

== Education ==
The school district is Lafourche Parish Public Schools.

Fletcher Technical Community College has Lafourche Parish in the college's service area. Additionally, a Delgado Community College document stated that Lafourche Parish was in the college's service area.
