= Camden Expedition order of battle: Confederate =

The following Confederate Army units and commanders fought in the Camden Expedition of the American Civil War. Order of battle compiled from the army organization during the campaign. The Union order of battle is listed separately.

== Abbreviations ==
=== Military rank ===
- Gen = General
- MG = Major General
- BG = Brigadier General
- Col = Colonel
- Ltc = Lieutenant Colonel
- Maj = Major
- Cpt = Captain
- Lt = 1st Lieutenant

=== Other ===
- k = killed
- w = wounded

== Confederate forces ==
Gen E. Kirby Smith, Commanding

=== District of Arkansas ===
MG Sterling Price

Escort:

- 14th Missouri Battalion

Division	Brigade	Regiments and Others
Fagan's Cavalry Division; BG James F. Fagan	Cabell's Brigade BG William L. Cabell	1st Arkansas Cavalry: Col James C. Monroe; 2nd Arkansas Cavalry: Col T. J. Morgan; 4th Arkansas Cavalry: Col A. Gordon; 7th Arkansas Cavalry: Col John F. Hill; Gunter's Arkansas Cavalry Battalion: Ltc Thomas M. Gunter; Blocher's Arkansas Battery
Fagan's Cavalry Division; BG James F. Fagan	Dockery's Brigade BG Thomas P. Dockery	18th Arkansas Infantry Regiment: Col Robert Hamilton Crockett; 19th and 15th Consolidated Infantry: Ltc H. G. P. Williams; 20th Arkansas Infantry Regiment: Col Daniel W. Jones; 12th Arkansas Infantry Battalion (Sharpshooters): Maj William F. Rapley
Fagan's Cavalry Division; BG James F. Fagan	Crawford's Brigade Col William A. Crawford	2nd Arkansas Cavalry Regiment (Slemons'): Cpt O.B. Tebbs; Crawford's Arkansas Cavalry: Col William A. Crawford; Wright's Arkansas Cavalry: Col John C. Wright; Poe's Arkansas Cavalry Battalion: Maj James T. Poe; McMurtrey's Arkansas Cavalry Battalion: Maj Elisha L. McMurtrey; Hughey's Arkansas Battery: Cpt William M. Hughey
Marmaduke's Cavalry Division; BG John S. Marmaduke	Greene's Brigade Col Colton Greene	3rd Missouri: Ltc Leonidas A. Campbell; 4th Missouri: Ltc William J. Preston; 7th Missouri: Col Solomon G. Kitchen; 8th Missouri: Col William L. Jeffers; 10th Missouri: Col Robert R. Lawther; Harris' Missouri Battery: Cpt S. S. Harris
Marmaduke's Cavalry Division; BG John S. Marmaduke	Shelby's Brigade BG Joseph O. Shelby	1st Missouri Battalion: Maj Benjamin Elliott; 5th Missouri: Col B. Frank Gordon; 11th Missouri: Col M. W. Smith; 12th Missouri: Col David Shanks; Hunter's Regiment: Col De Witt C. Hunter; Collins' Missouri Battery: Cpt Richard A. Collins
Maxey's Cavalry Division; BG Samuel B. Maxey	Gano's Brigade Col Charles DeMorse	29th Texas: Maj J. A. Carroll; 30th Texas: Ltc N. W. Battle; 31st Texas: Maj Michael Looscan; Welch's Company: Lt Frank M. Gano; Krumbhaar's Texas Battery: Cpt W. Butler Krumbhaar
Maxey's Cavalry Division; BG Samuel B. Maxey	Second Indian Brigade Col Tandy Walker	1st Regiment: Ltc James Riley; 2nd Regiment: Col Simpson W. Folsom
Walkers's Division; MG John G. Walker (w)	Waul's Brigade BG Thomas N. Waul	12th Texas: -; 18th Texas: -; 22nd Texas: -; 13th Texas Cavalry (dismounted): -
Walkers's Division; MG John G. Walker (w)	Scurry's Brigade BG William R. Scurry (k)	3rd Texas: - Col Philip N. Luckett; 16th Texas: -; 17th Texas: -; 19th Texas: -; 16th Texas Cavalry (dismounted): -
Walkers's Division; MG John G. Walker (w)	Randal's Brigade Col Horace Randal (k)	11th Texas: -; 14th Texas: -; 28th Texas Cavalry (dismounted): -; 6th Texas (Gould's) Cavalry Battalion (dismounted): -
Arkansas Division; BG Thomas J. Churchill	Tappan's Brigade BG James C. Tappan	Dawson's and Portlock's Consolidated Arkansas Infantry: Ltc William R. Hardy; Shaver's and Gaither's Consolidated Arkansas Infantry: Col Robert G. Shaver; Grinsted's Arkansas Infantry Regiment: Col Hiram L. Grinsted (k)
Arkansas Division; BG Thomas J. Churchill	Gause's Brigade Col Lucien C. Gause	26th Arkansas Infantry: Ltc Iverson L. Brooks; 32nd Arkansas Infantry: Ltc William Hicks; 36th Arkansas Infantry: Col James M. Davie
Arkansas Division; BG Thomas J. Churchill	Hawthorn's Brigade BG Alexander T. Hawthorn	34th Arkansas Infantry: -; 35th Arkansas Infantry: -; 37th Arkansas Infantry: -; Cocke's Arkansas Infantry: Col John B. Cocke (k)
Missouri Division; BG Mosby M. Parsons	1st Brigade BG John Bullock Clark, Jr.	8th Missouri: Col Charles S. Mitchell; 9th Missouri: Col R. H. Musser; Ruffner's Missouri Battery: Cpt Samuel T. Ruffner
Missouri Division; BG Mosby M. Parsons	2nd Brigade Col Simon P. Burns	10th Missouri Infantry Regiment: Col William M. Moore; 11th Missouri: Ltc Thomas H. Murray; 12th Missouri: Col Willis M. Ponder; 16th Missouri: Ltc P. W. H. Cumming; 9th Missouri Battalion Sharpshooters: Maj L. A. Pindall; Lesueur's Missouri Battery: Cpt A. A. Lesueur
