= 18th Texas Infantry Regiment =

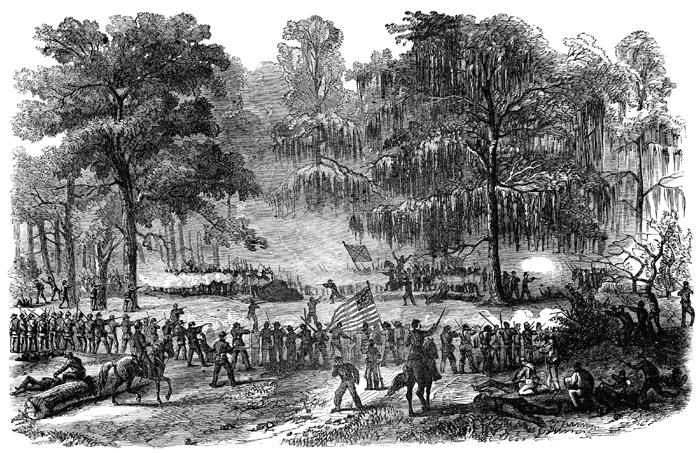
- Battle of Bayou Bourbeux sketch from Leslie's Illustrated
- Active: 13 May 1862 – 26 May 1865
- Country: Confederate States of America
- Allegiance: Confederate States of America, Texas
- Branch: Confederate States Army
- Type: Infantry
- Size: Regiment
- Nickname: Ochiltree's Regiment
- Engagements: American Civil War; Battle of Milliken's Bend (1863); Battle of Richmond, La. (1863); Battle of Bayou Bourbeux (1863); Battle of Mansfield (1864); Battle of Pleasant Hill (1864); Battle of Jenkins' Ferry (1864)

Commanders
- Notable commanders: W. B. Ochiltree; Wilburn H. King

The 18th Texas Infantry Regiment was a unit of volunteers recruited in Texas that fought in the Confederate States Army during the American Civil War. The regiment was enrolled in Confederate service in May 1862 and always campaigned west of the Mississippi River in the region known as the Trans-Mississippi Department. The unit was assigned to the Texas infantry division known as Walker's Greyhounds. The regiment fought at Milliken's Bend, Richmond (La.), and Bayou Bourbeux in 1863 and Mansfield, Pleasant Hill, and Jenkins' Ferry in 1864. The regiment disbanded in mid-May 1865, but its formal surrender date was 26 May 1865.

== Formation ==
The 18th Texas Infantry Regiment formed at Jefferson, Texas, and its muster date was listed as 13 May 1862. The unit organized during the summer and fall of 1862. The regiment was fated to spend its entire existence west of the Mississippi River. According to an 1863 muster roll, the field officers were Colonel W. B. Ochiltree, Lieutenant Colonel D. B. Culbertson, and Major Wilburn H. King. Personnel attached to regimental headquarters included Surgeon F. D. Halowguest, Assistant Surgeon J. N. B. Gwinn, Quartermaster William Colby, and Adjutant D. D. Walton. Eleven companies were enrolled, with captains and the counties where the men were recruited shown in the following table. Note that by 1863, Company L had disappeared.

Captains and Recruiting Counties: 18th Texas Infantry Regiment (Note: Blessington (pp. 47–48) gave an identical list of captains, but did not include Company L or the recruiting counties.)
Company	Captain	Recruiting County
A	Matthew A. Gaston	Cherokee
B	R. Z. Buckner	Marion and Rusk
C	Thomas R. Bonner	Cherokee and Rusk
D	John K. Cocke	Jefferson and Marion
E	Richard Keningham	Hopkins
F	Joseph G. W. Wood	Angelina and Titus
G	J. Dansby	Rusk
H	J. W. Duncan	Upshur
I	W. W. Thompson	Shelby and Rusk
K	W. H. Lovelady	Cherokee
L	James McKnight	not given

== Service ==
=== 1862 ===
Sometime in late 1862, part of the 18th Texas Infantry Regiment was mounted and ordered to ride south of the Rio Grande into Mexico to secure a large herd of cattle that was bought for the Confederate States. The cattle were safely escorted back to central Texas. At some time in the fall, the regiment marched to Camp Nelson in Arkansas. Illness and epidemics swept through the large number of soldiers who bivouacked there, so that 1,500 men died. The fatalities included Brigadier General Allison Nelson, commander of the Texas infantry, for whom the camp was named.

At Camp Nelson, Brigadier General Henry E. McCulloch organized the Texas soldiers into an infantry division. McCulloch assigned the dismounted 13th Texas Cavalry to the 1st Brigade under the command of Colonel Overton Young. The other units assigned to Young's 1st Brigade were the 12th Texas Infantry, 13th Texas Dismounted Cavalry, and 22nd Texas Infantry Regiments, and Captain Horace Halderman's 4-gun artillery battery. Subsequent commanders of the 1st Brigade were Brigadier Generals James Morrison Hawes, Thomas N. Waul, and Wilburn H. King. (Note: Blessington's account listed a Brigadier General Ward, but this was a typographical error for Waul (Derbes, 2011).) The division was originally made up of four brigades, but the 4th Brigade was ordered to Arkansas Post where it was captured by Union forces. After these captured troops were released by prisoner exchange, they served in Confederate armies east of the Mississippi River and never returned to the Trans-Mississippi Department. On 26 December 1862, Major General John George Walker took command of the division and McCulloch was given command of the 3rd Brigade.

=== 1863 ===
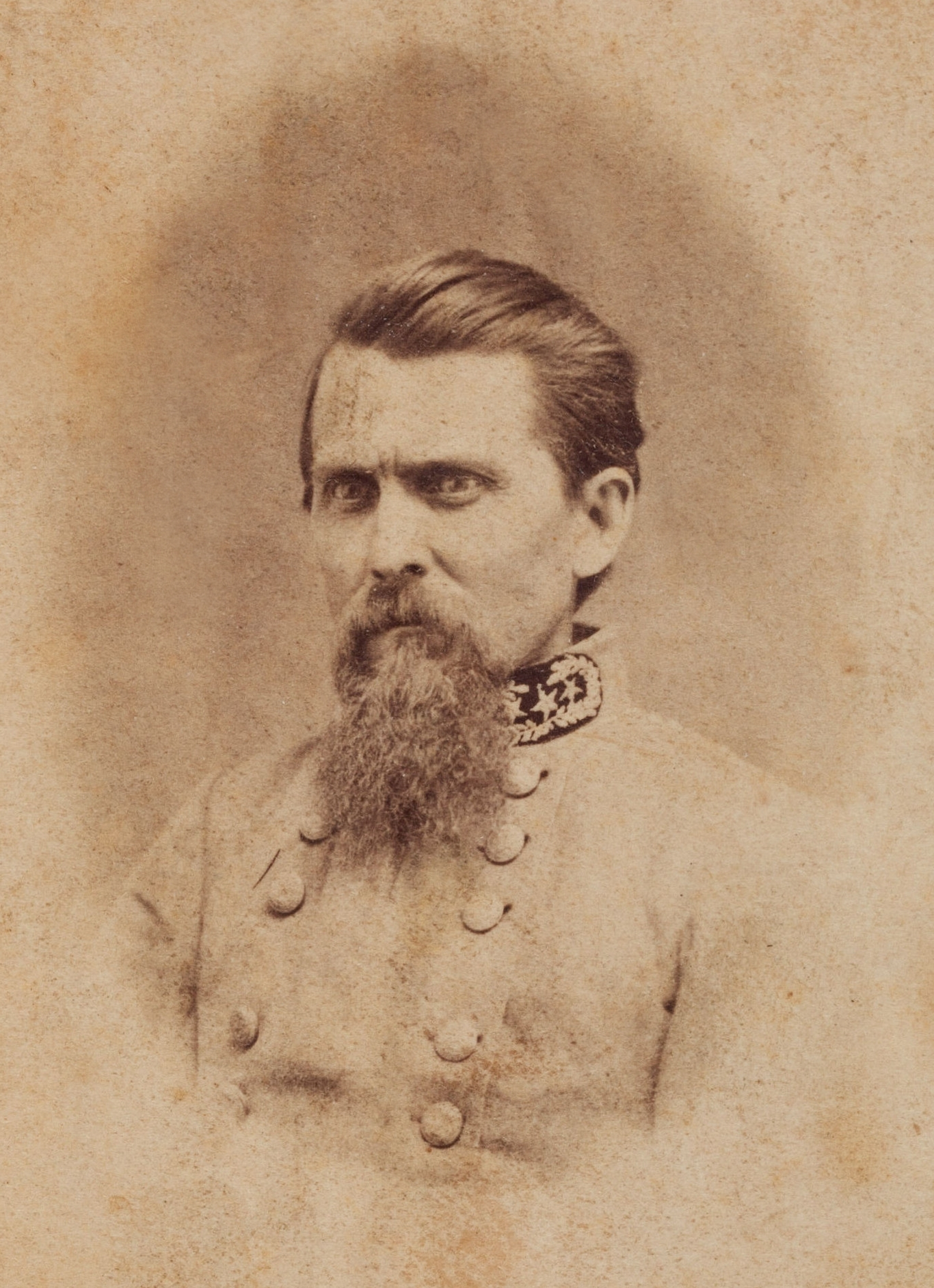
John G. Walker

The division marched to Pine Bluff, Arkansas, but on 11 January 1863, the troops were ordered to march to Arkansas Post. However, a day later they found that the place had surrendered. During the winter, Hawes replaced Young in command of 1st Brigade. The division remained at Pine Bluff until 24 April 1863, when it was ordered to march to Monroe, Louisiana. The Confederate commander in Louisiana, Lieutenant General Richard Taylor, planned to have Walker's division attack New Orleans, but his superiors insisted that something must be done to help the Confederate force trapped in the Siege of Vicksburg. Taylor ordered Walker to march to Richmond, Louisiana, in order to attack Federal positions on the west bank of the Mississippi River. The Texas division arrived at Richmond on the morning of 6 June where Walker received faulty intelligence which underestimated the Union strength at Milliken's Bend and Young's Point. That night, Walker's troops marched to Oak Grove Plantation where the road forked. Walker instructed Hawes' brigade to use the right fork to Young's Point and McCulloch's brigade to use the left fork toward Milliken's Bend. Walker held Brigadier General Horace Randal's brigade at Oak Grove as a reserve.

On 7 June 1863, in the Battle of Milliken's Bend, McCulloch's 1,500 troops assaulted 1,061 Union soldiers led by Colonel Hermann Lieb. The Union force was made up of elements of the 1st Mississippi (African), 8th Louisiana (African), 9th Louisiana (African), 11th Louisiana (African), 13th Louisiana (African), and 23rd Iowa Infantry Regiments. (Note: The 13th Louisiana was never authorized and disbanded one month later (Dobak, p. 183). All the "African" regiments except for the 13th were later taken into United States service (Dobak, p. 179).) Of these, about 900 were Black soldiers, while there were fewer than 200 white soldiers in the 23rd Iowa. Because the Black soldiers were badly trained, most of their first volley missed and the Texans charged into them. The Union soldiers briefly held the levee in a brutal melee of bayonets and musket butts, before fleeing to the riverbank. The Union gunboat USS Choctaw shelled the levee, keeping the Texans from approaching the riverbank. When it was joined by the USS Lexington, McCulloch stopped the attack. Union casualties numbered 652 while Confederate losses were 185.

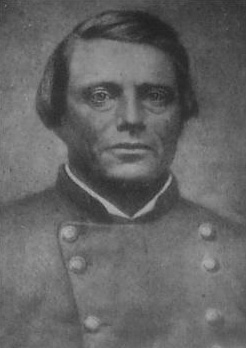
Thomas Green

Hawes' brigade, which had a longer march, was delayed by a destroyed bridge. When the 1st Brigade arrived at Young's Point in an exhausted state, they were confronted by Union soldiers in formidable defenses, backed by gunboats. Hawes decided not to attack the Union position. After the battle, Walker's division retired to Richmond where it camped until 15 June, when it was attacked by a Union force in the Battle of Richmond. Walker ordered the 18th Texas Infantry under Colonel Culbertson and Captain William Edgar's 1st Texas Field Battery to take a position behind Roundaway Bayou and delay the Federals while the division's wagon train made its escape. When the Union soldiers got within 150 yd (137 m), the 18th Texas and the battery opened fire, causing their foes to flee. The 18th Texas crossed the bayou in pursuit, and when the Union soldiers rallied in a nearby woods, Culbertson ordered his men to return to their original position. Walker withdrew the division from Richmond until it crossed Bayou Macon when the Union pursuit ended. The Union force was led by Brigadier General Joseph A. Mower and included his own 2nd Brigade, 3rd Division, XV Corps and Brigadier General Alfred W. Ellet's Mississippi Marine Brigade. Mower reported that his leading unit, the 5th Minnesota Infantry Regiment came into action and lost 1 man killed and 8 wounded.

For a time, Walker's division remained near Delhi, Louisiana, during which time disease badly diminished the number of his soldiers fit for duty. Walker's division was ordered south to Alexandria, where it remained until 10 August. The division moved south to oppose a Union expedition led by Major General William B. Franklin. On 23 October, Franklin's force occupied Washington, Louisiana. Taylor was prepared to offer battle near Washington with 11,000 men, but Franklin's superior force retreated. Taylor formed an ad hoc brigade led by Colonel Oran Milo Roberts, which consisted of the 18th Texas, 11th Texas, and 15th Texas Infantry Regiments, and sent it to assist Brigadier General Thomas Green's cavalry. The three Texas infantry regiments took part in a brilliant action at the Battle of Bayou Bourbeux on 3 November 1863. Green's plan was to have Roberts' brigade attack the Federals from the north, with Colonel Arthur P. Bagby Jr.'s cavalry on its right flank and Colonel James Patrick Major's partisan rangers on Bagby's right. Roberts' 950-man brigade was deployed with the 15th Texas on the right, the 18th under Colonel King in the center, and the 11th on the left. After a three-hour fight, the Union force under Brigadier General Stephen G. Burbridge was driven from the field with losses of 200 killed and wounded, and 600 captured. Roberts' brigade lost 21 killed, 82 wounded, and 38 prisoners. The 18th Texas reported losses of 10 killed, 40 wounded, and 4 missing.

=== 1864–1865 ===
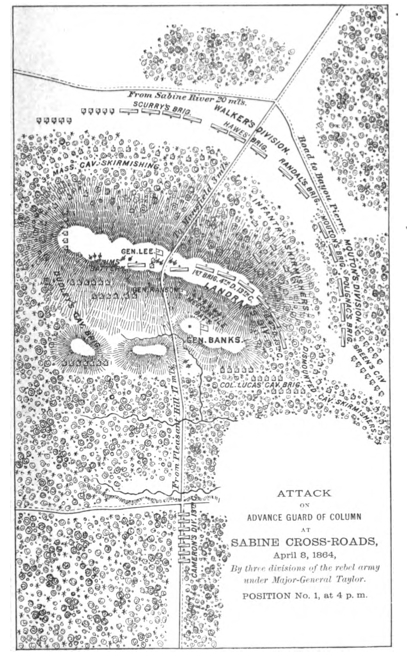
Battle of Mansfield, 8 April 1864

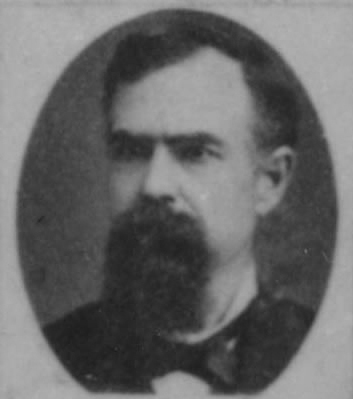
Wilburn H. King

The brigades of Hawes and Randal went into winter quarters at Marksville, Louisiana, in 1863–1864. At the end of February 1864, Waul replaced Hawes in command of the 1st Brigade. In the Red River campaign, a Union force of 26,000 men led by Major General Nathaniel P. Banks and supported by 13 gunboats attempted to seize Shreveport. At the Battle of Mansfield on 8 April 1864, Taylor commanded 11,000 soldiers in the infantry divisions of Walker and Brigadier General Alfred Mouton, and Green's cavalry division. Walker's division was deployed on the west side of the main highway with Brigadier General William R. Scurry's brigade on the right, Waul's brigade in the center, and Randal's brigade on the left. Mouton's division was on the east side of the highway. At 4 pm, Taylor ordered an assault which overwhelmed the Federals. In the rout, Banks' forces lost an estimated 200 killed, 900 wounded, 1,800 missing, 20 guns, and 250 wagons. Confederate casualties were about 1,000. This battle marked the defeat of Banks' campaign.

On 9 April 1864, Taylor was reinforced to 14,300 troops and he attacked Banks' Union forces in the Battle of Pleasant Hill. Walker's division attacked but the Federal troops opposing it held firm. Other Confederate attacks were also defeated. Both armies retreated, the Confederates after losing 1,500 casualties and the Federals after losing 1,369 casualties. Next, Walker's division was ordered to march into Arkansas to oppose another Federal invading force. At the Battle of Jenkins' Ferry on 30 April, Confederate Lieutenant General Edmund Kirby Smith attacked the withdrawing Union force under Major General Frederick Steele. Smith sent his troops into action piecemeal, and the Federals were able to repel every assault. Walker's division arrived last and was immediately thrown into action, but it was also beaten back. Scurry's brigade arrived first and fought for 40 minutes until Waul's brigade came into action, and Randal's brigade came even later. Both Scurry and Randal died of their wounds, and casualties among the rank and file were substantial. Steele continued retreating to Little Rock, Arkansas.

On 12 May 1864, Waul resigned his command of the 1st Brigade and was replaced by Colonel King of the 18th Texas Infantry; King was promoted brigadier general. On 17 June 1864, Major General John Horace Forney replaced Walker in command of the division. Until Forney arrived, King temporarily led the division. On 18 February 1865, Forney's division was in Shreveport where the soldiers put on a military review and enjoyed a feast. In late February 1865, Forney's division was augmented by several regiments and a new brigade was created. King was assigned to command the new 4th Brigade, to which the 18th Texas Infantry was transferred. The other regiments in the 4th Brigade were Wells' Texas Cavalry, the 16th Texas Infantry, 28th Texas Dismounted Cavalry, and 34th Texas Dismounted Cavalry Regiments. On 5 March, the division was ordered to march to Hempstead, Texas, and arrived there near Camp Groce on 15 April. By 19 May most of the soldiers had gone home, but the official surrender date for the Trans-Mississippi Department was 26 May 1865.

== Notes ==
Footnotes

Citations
