= 13th Texas Cavalry Regiment =

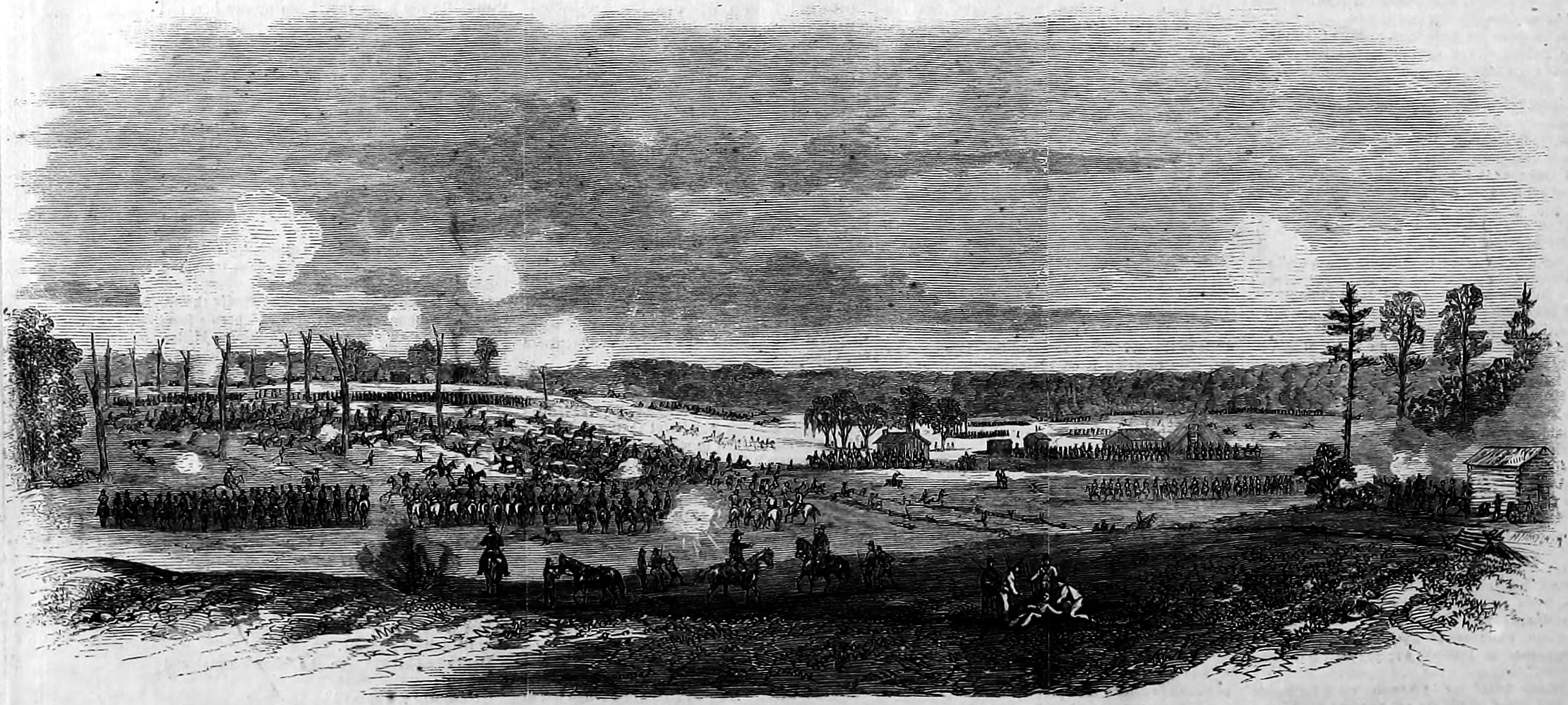
- Battle of Mansfield sketch from Leslie's Illustrated
- Active: 22 February 1862 – 2 June 1865
- Country: Confederate States of America
- Allegiance: Confederate States of America, Texas
- Branch: Confederate States Army
- Type: Cavalry, Infantry
- Size: Regiment
- Nickname: Burnett's Regiment
- Engagements: American Civil War; Battle of Lake Providence (1863); Battle of Mansfield (1864); Battle of Pleasant Hill (1864); Battle of Jenkins' Ferry (1864)

Commanders
- Notable commanders: John H. Burnett

The 13th Texas Cavalry Regiment was a unit of mounted volunteers recruited in Texas that fought in the Confederate States Army during the American Civil War. The regiment was enrolled in Confederate service in February 1862 and served exclusively west of the Mississippi River. The unit was later dismounted and became part of the Texas infantry division known as Walker's Greyhounds. The regiment fought at Milliken's Bend in 1863 and Mansfield, Pleasant Hill, and Jenkins' Ferry in 1864. The regiment disbanded in May 1865, but its official surrender date was 2 June 1865.

== Formation ==
The 13th Texas Cavalry Regiment organized at Crockett, Texas, in late 1861 and mustered into Confederate service at Camp Burnett on 22 February 1862. Its field officers were Colonel John H. Burnett, Lieutenant Colonel Anderson F. Crawford, and Majors Charles R. Beatty and Elias T. Seale. A total of 1,125 men enlisted from the following counties: Anderson, Angelina, Cherokee, Leon, Henderson, Houston, Hunt, Jasper, Kaufman, Madison, McLennan, Newton, Orange, Polk, Trinity, and Tyler. The provisions of the 1862 Confederate Conscription Act reduced the regiment to 842 men. Other personnel attached to regimental headquarters were Surgeon Thomas H. Hollis, Assistant Surgeon J. R. Cornish, Quartermaster R. J. Blain, and Adjutant J. Patrick Henry.

Captains of the 13th Texas Cavalry Regiment (1863)
| Company | Captain |
|---|---|
| A | G. W. Nash |
| B | J. F. Smith |
| C | C. J. English |
| D | James S. Hawks |
| E | James Eastland |
| F | Samuel Brown Thomas |
| G | Thomas S. Frunth |
| H | S. Stark |
| I | Samuel A. Fairchild |
| K | John F. Beam |

== Service ==
=== 1862 ===
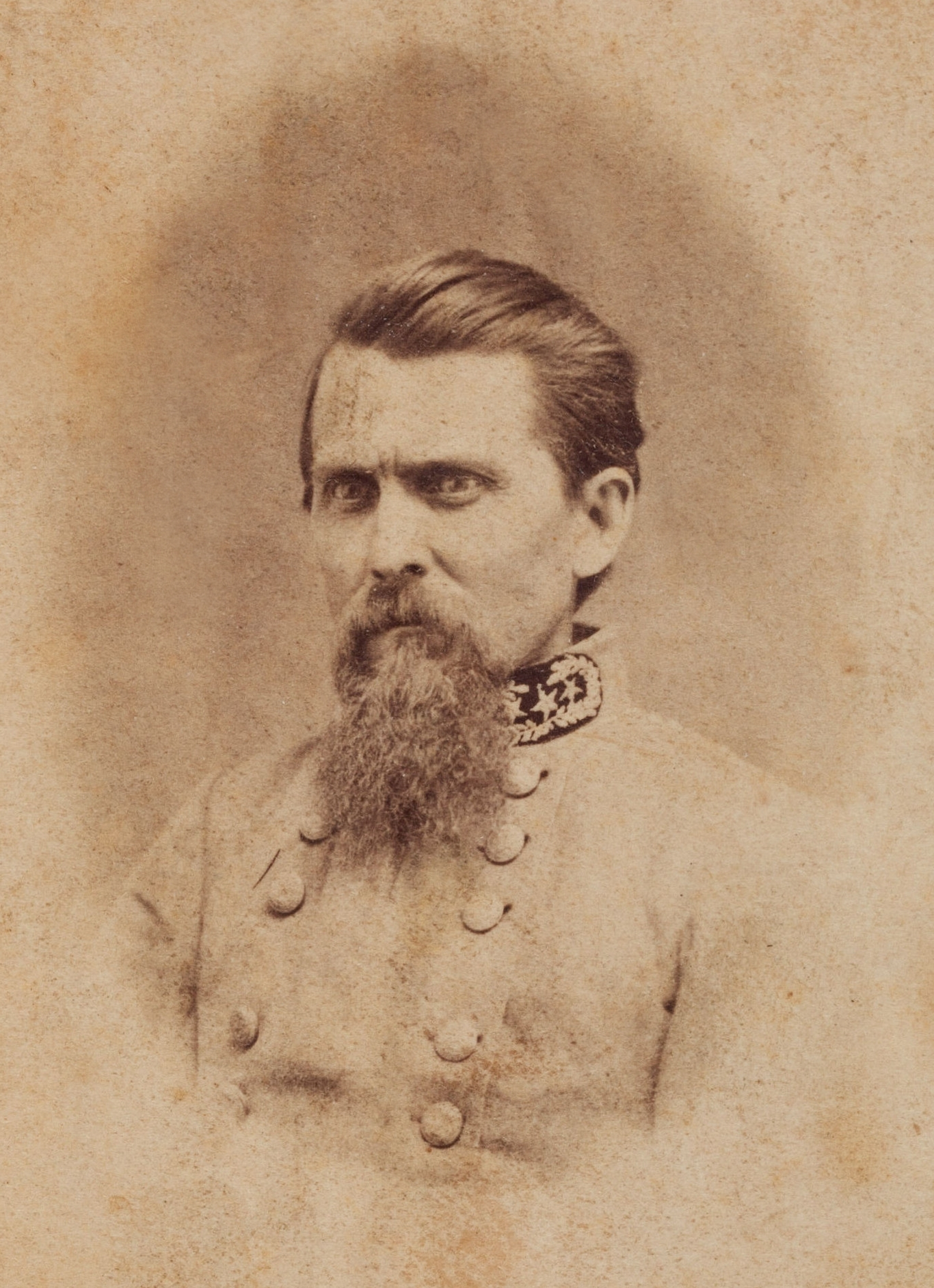
John G. Walker

On 2 July 1862, the 13th Texas Cavalry received orders to march from Camp McCulloch near Tyler, Texas, to Camp Nelson in Arkansas. While passing through Lafayette County, Arkansas, an epidemic of measles and typhoid fever broke out, killing 30 men and causing the regiment to pause its march. Cavalry service proved extremely popular among Texas soldiers, so much so, that there was not enough infantry manpower. Therefore, the Confederate authorities dismounted many Texas cavalry regiments, forcing the soldiers to serve as foot soldiers. Burnett's 13th Texas Cavalry was one of the regiments selected for conversion to infantry. The soldiers were not happy with this arrangement and complained at their treatment.

While at Camp Nelson, Brigadier General Henry E. McCulloch organized the Texas soldiers into an infantry division. McCulloch assigned the dismounted 13th Texas Cavalry to the 1st Brigade under the command of Colonel Overton Young. The other units assigned to Young's 1st Brigade were the 12th Texas Infantry, 18th Texas Infantry, and 22nd Texas Infantry Regiments, and Captain Horace Halderman's 4-gun artillery battery. Subsequent commanders of the 1st Brigade were Brigadier Generals James Morrison Hawes, Thomas N. Waul, and Wilburn H. King. (Note: Blessington's account listed a Brigadier General Ward, but this was probably a typographical error for Waul (Derbes, 2011).) The division originally consisted of four brigades, but the 4th Brigade was sent to Arkansas Post where it was captured in a body. After these captured troops were released via prisoner exchange, they served in Confederate armies east of the Mississippi River and never returned to the Trans-Mississippi Department.

=== 1863 ===
On 24 November 1862, the regiment was ordered to march to Bayou Meto, where the division was reviewed by the department commander Lieutenant General Theophilus H. Holmes three days later. On 26 December, Major General John George Walker assumed command of the division and McCulloch took over leadership of the 3rd Brigade. The division marched to Pine Bluff, Arkansas, but on 11 January 1863, the troops were ordered to go to Arkansas Post. After marching for one day, news arrived that the place had surrendered. While at Pine Bluff, the men of the 13th Texas Cavalry helped build fortifications. During the winter of 1862–63, many men were afflicted with typhoid fever, pneumonia, and tuberculosis, so that there were only 615 men left with the regiment by the end of February 1863. During the winter, Hawes replaced Young in command of 1st Brigade. The division remained at Pine Bluff until 24 April 1863, when it was ordered to march to Monroe, Louisiana.

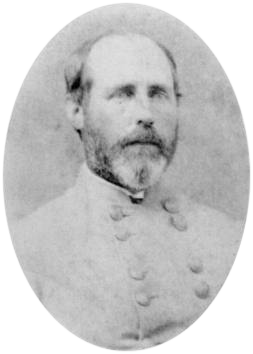
James M. Hawes

Lieutenant General Richard Taylor, the Confederate commander in Louisiana, wanted to use Walker's division to attack New Orleans, but his superiors were adamant that something should be done to help their compatriots trapped in the Siege of Vicksburg. Taylor ordered Walker to march to Richmond, Louisiana, so that his troops might attack Federal troops on the west bank of the Mississippi River. The Texas division arrived at Richmond on the morning of 6 June where Walker received faulty intelligence which underestimated the Union strength at Milliken's Bend and Young's Point. That night, Walker's troops marched to Oak Grove Plantation where the road forked. Walker directed Hawes' brigade to take the right fork to Young's Point and McCulloch's brigade to take the left fork toward Milliken's Bend while holding Brigadier General Horace Randal's brigade at Oak Grove.

In the Battle of Milliken's Bend on 7 June 1863, McCulloch's 1,500 men attacked 1,061 Union soldiers led by Colonel Hermann Lieb. The Union force consisted of elements of the 1st Mississippi (African), 8th Louisiana (African), 9th Louisiana (African), 11th Louisiana (African), 13th Louisiana (African), and 23rd Iowa Infantry Regiments. (Note: The 13th Louisiana was never authorized and disbanded one month later (Dobak, p. 183). Except for the 13th, the "African" regiments were later taken into United States service (Dobak, p. 179).) Of these, about 900 were Black soldiers, while there were fewer than 200 white soldiers in the 23rd Iowa. Because the Black soldiers were poorly trained, most of their first volley missed and the Texans charged into them. The Union soldiers briefly held the levee in a furious melee of bayonets and musket butts, before fleeing to the riverbank. The Union gunboat USS Choctaw was joined by the USS Lexington in shelling the levee, causing McCulloch to call off the attack. Union casualties numbered 652 while Confederate losses were 185. Hawes' brigade, which had a much longer march, was delayed by a destroyed bridge. When the soldiers arrived at Young's Point in an exhausted state, they were confronted by Union soldiers in formidable defenses, backed by gunboats. Hawes declined to attack. The 13th Texas Cavalry was part of a third strike towards Lake Providence, Louisiana. This operation resulted in the Battle of Lake Providence on June 9 and accomplished little.

Walker reported that while his division remained near Delhi, Louisiana, his troops were engaged in confiscating and burning cotton. At the same time, he noted that disease had severely reduced the number of his soldiers fit for duty. Walker's division was ordered south to Alexandria, where it remained until 10 August. On 17 October near Opelousas, the 13th Texas Cavalry had picket duty when a Union expedition led by Major General William B. Franklin was nearby. The 13th Texas was relieved by the 16th Texas Infantry Regiment on 21 October, and the next day Union forces drove them out of Opelousas. Taylor was prepared to offer battle near Washington, but Franklin retreated. In the Battle of Bayou Bourbeux on 3 November 1863, only three Texas regiments came into action, and these did not include the 13th Texas Cavalry.

=== 1864–1865 ===
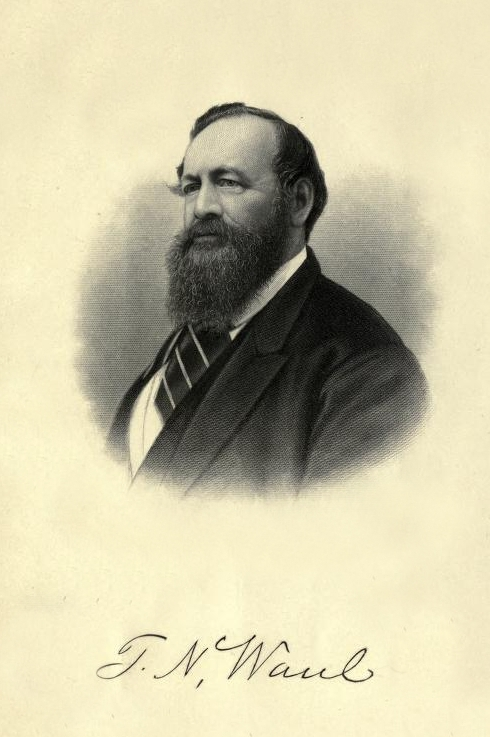
Thomas N. Waul

During the winter of 1863–64, the brigades of Hawes and Randal went into winter quarters at Marksville, Louisiana. At the end of February 1864, Hawes was relieved and replaced in command of the 1st Brigade by Waul. By February 1864, the 13th Texas Cavalry counted only 145 men. In the Red River campaign a Federal force of 26,000 men under Major General Nathaniel P. Banks supported by 13 gunboats moved toward Shreveport. Taylor had 11,000 soldiers in the infantry divisions of Walker and Brigadier General Alfred Mouton, and Brigadier General Thomas Green's cavalry. At the Battle of Mansfield on 8 April 1864, Walker's division was deployed on the south side of the highway with Brigadier General William R. Scurry's brigade on the right, Waul's brigade in the center, and Randal's brigade on the left. Mouton's division was north of the highway. At 4 pm, Taylor ordered an assault which routed the Union troops. The Federals lost an estimated 200 killed, 900 wounded, 1,800 missing, 20 guns, and 250 wagons. Confederate casualties were about 1,000.

On 9 April 1864, Taylor was reinforced to 14,300 troops and he attacked Banks' Union forces in the Battle of Pleasant Hill. This time, Walker's division was unable to drive back the Federals opposing it and the Confederate attacks were repulsed. Both sides retreated, the Confederates after losing 1,500 casualties and the Federals after losing 1,369 casualties. At Mansfield and Pleasant Hill, the 13th Texas Cavalry lost about 50 casualties. Burnett resigned his command on 22 April due to chronic illness and returned home. Next, Walker's division was ordered to march into Arkansas to oppose another column of Federal troops at the Battle of Jenkins' Ferry on 30 April. At Jenkins' Ferry, Confederate Lieutenant General Edmund Kirby Smith attacked the retreating Union force under Major General Frederick Steele. Smith sent his troops into action as they arrived on the field, and the Federals were able to repel every assault. Walker's division arrived last and was thrown into action, but it was also repulsed. Walker's troops were also committed piecemeal. Scurry's brigade fought for 40 minutes until Waul's brigade came into action, and Randal's brigade came last. Both Scurry and Randal were fatally wounded, and losses among the rank and file were serious. Steele continued his retreat to Little Rock, Arkansas.

On 17 June 1864, Walker was relieved of command of the division and soon replaced by Major General John Horace Forney. In November 1864, the regiment moved to Minden, Louisiana to prepare winter quarters. It marched to Shreveport where it enjoyed a feast on 18 February 1865. The 13th Texas Cavalry was ordered to return to Texas and arrived at Camp Groce near Hempstead on 27 April 1865. By 19 May most of the soldiers had gone home, but the official surrender date was 2 June 1865.

== Notes ==
Footnotes

Citations
