= 11th Texas Infantry Regiment =

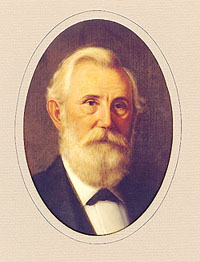
- Oran Milo Roberts was colonel of the 11th Texas. He was later elected governor (shown here) of Texas.
- Active: Winter 1861–62 – 26 May 1865
- Country: Confederate States of America
- Allegiance: Confederate States of America, Texas
- Branch: Confederate States Army
- Type: Infantry
- Size: Regiment
- Engagements: American Civil War; Battle of Milliken's Bend (1863); Battle of Bayou Bourbeux (1863); Battle of Mansfield (1864); Battle of Pleasant Hill (1864); Battle of Jenkins' Ferry (1864)

Commanders
- Notable commanders: Oran Milo Roberts

The 11th Texas Infantry Regiment was a unit of volunteers recruited in Texas that fought in the Confederate States Army during the American Civil War. The regiment organized in the winter of 1861–1862 and always served west of the Mississippi River in the Trans-Mississippi Department. The unit was assigned to the 2nd Brigade of the Texas infantry division known as Walker's Greyhounds. The regiment fought at Milliken's Bend and Bayou Bourbeux in 1863 and Mansfield, Pleasant Hill, and Jenkins' Ferry in 1864. The regiment disbanded in mid-May 1865, but its formal surrender date was 26 May 1865.

== Formation ==
The 11th Texas Infantry Regiment was mustered into Confederate service in the winter of 1861–62 near Houston. The unit would serve its entire existence west of the Mississippi River in the region known as the Trans-Mississippi Department. According to a muster roll from 1863, the field officers were Colonel Oran Milo Roberts, Lieutenant Colonel James M. Jones, and Major Nathaniel J. Caraway. On the regimental staff were Surgeon A. J. V. Doney, Quartermaster W. M. Ross, Commissary John H. Douglas and Adjutant W. H. Christian. Others who served as field officers during the war were Lieutenant Colonels Andrew J. Coupland and William G. Engledow, and Major Thomas H. Rountree. The regiment formed ten companies which included men from Cherokee, Franklin, Gregg, Harrison, Hopkins, Kaufman, Nacogdoches, Panola, Rusk, San Augustine, Shelby, and Van Zandt Counties.

Captains of the 11th Texas Infantry Regiment (1863)
Company	Captain
A	M. Mast
B	Thomas Smith
C	William G. Engledow
D	Thomas H. Rountree
E	A. F. Jordan
F	R. P. Sibley
G	G. T. Walker
H	A. H. Johnston
I	T. B. Smith
K	O. E. Roberts

== Service ==
=== 1862 ===
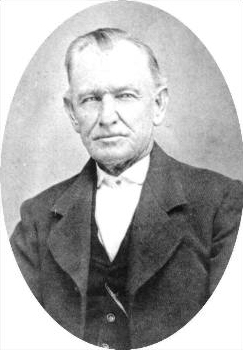
Henry McCulloch

On 1 March 1862, the 11th Texas Infantry Regiment was assigned to the Army of New Mexico, but there is no record that it ever served with that force. In May 1862, the regiment was located at Camp Lubbock in Harris County where 1,338 men were mustered, but only 408 were fit for duty. On 30 May, the unit left Camp Lubbock and marched to Camp Clough near Tyler, Texas, arriving on 20 June. The regiment remained in East Texas until August 1862, during which time it was provided with cloth for tents, knapsacks, and some uniforms by the Texas State Penitentiary at Huntsville. On 20 September 1862, the 11th Texas Infantry was assigned to the 2nd Brigade, 1st Division. By this time, the Texas infantry was camped near Brownsville, Arkansas, under the command of Brigadier General Allison Nelson. On 13 October, the 11th and Colonel Joseph W. Speight's 15th Texas Infantry Regiment, and Edgar's Texas Battery were ordered to march to Austin, Arkansas, followed the next day by the other Texas troops. The Texans went into winter quarters at Camp Nelson, near Austin. The camp, named for the general who had just died, was stricken with epidemics that killed 1,500 soldiers that fall and winter.

While at Camp Nelson, Brigadier General Henry E. McCulloch organized the Texas troops into an infantry division which consisted of four brigades. About three months later, McCulloch was replaced by Major General John George Walker and the division became known as Walker's Greyhounds. McCulloch then took command of the 3rd Brigade. The 11th Texas Infantry was assigned to Colonel Horace Randal's 2nd Brigade along with the 28th Texas Dismounted Cavalry and 14th Texas Infantry Regiments, Robert S. Gould's Texas Infantry Battalion, and Captain J. M. Daniel's Texas Battery. The 4th Brigade was soon detached and captured by Union forces at the Battle of Arkansas Post. Later, its soldiers were released by a prisoner exchange and subsequently served east of the Mississippi River.

=== 1863 ===
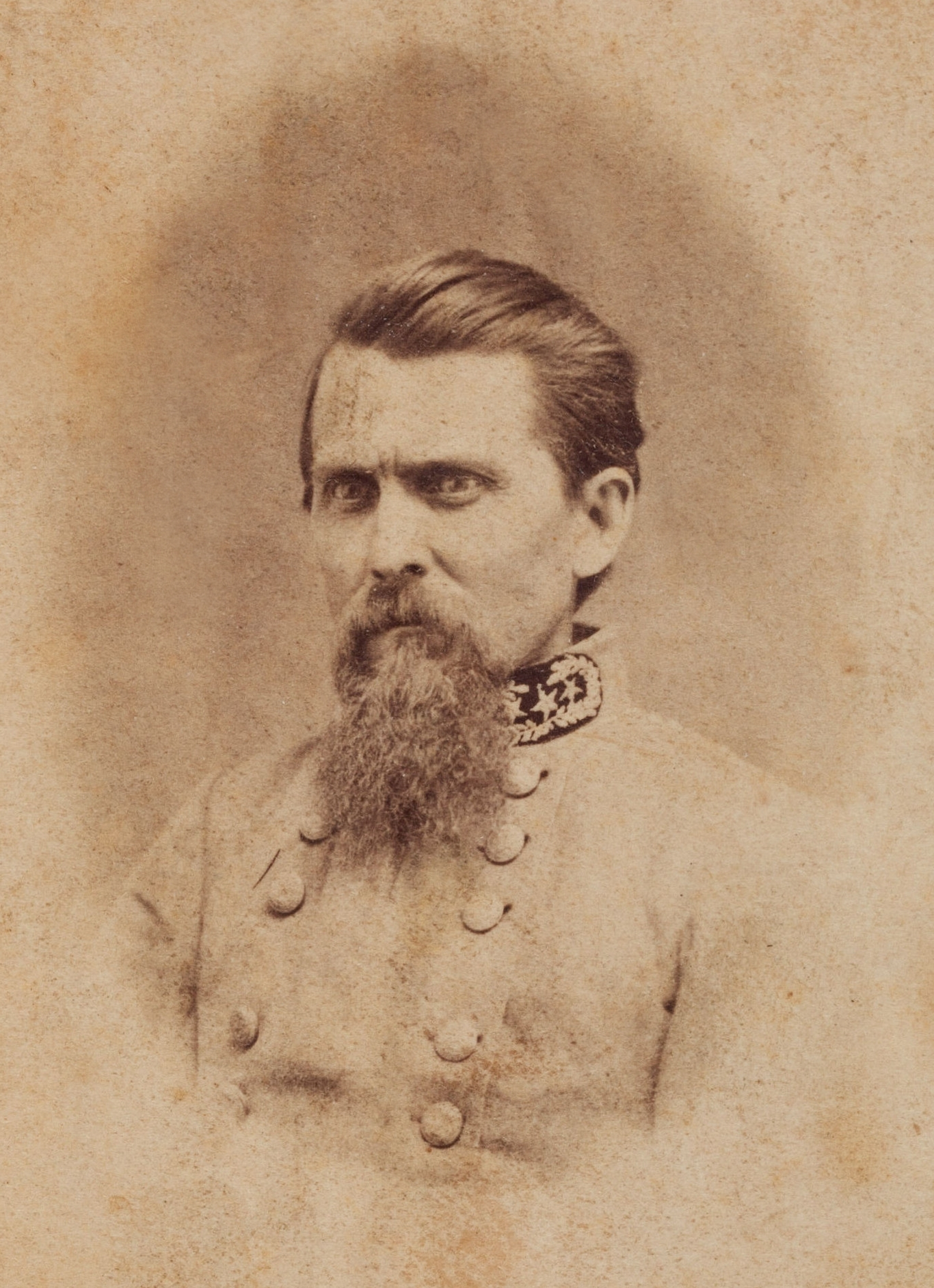
John G. Walker

On 11 January 1863, Walker's division arrived near Pine Bluff, Arkansas. That day, the division was ordered to march to the relief of Arkansas Post, but news was received the next day that the place surrendered. For several days, the division camped in that location, called "Camp Freeze-Out" by the soldiers because of the bitterly cold weather. On 19 January, the division marched back to Pine Bluff where they spent the winter in a comfortable and healthy camp. On 23 April, the division was ordered to march to Monroe, Louisiana. In mid-May, Walker's division marched from Monroe to Campti, and traveled by steamer on the Red River from Campti to Alexandria. On 31 May, the division reached Perkins' Landing which its Federal garrison hastily evacuated after a brief skirmish with McCulloch's 3rd Brigade. Confederate losses were 1 killed and 6 wounded.

Lieutenant General Richard Taylor, the Confederate commander in Louisiana was ordered to help the Confederate army trapped in the Siege of Vicksburg. Taylor instructed Walker to march to Richmond, Louisiana, to attack Union army camps on the west bank of the Mississippi River. Walker's division reached Richmond on the morning of 6 June where misleading intelligence was received that underestimated the size of the Federal forces at Milliken's Bend and Young's Point. That night, Walker's troops marched to Oak Grove Plantation where the road forked. Walker instructed Brigadier General James Morrison Hawes' brigade to use the right fork to Young's Point and McCulloch's brigade to use the left fork toward Milliken's Bend. Walker held Brigadier General Horace Randal's brigade at Oak Grove as a reserve.

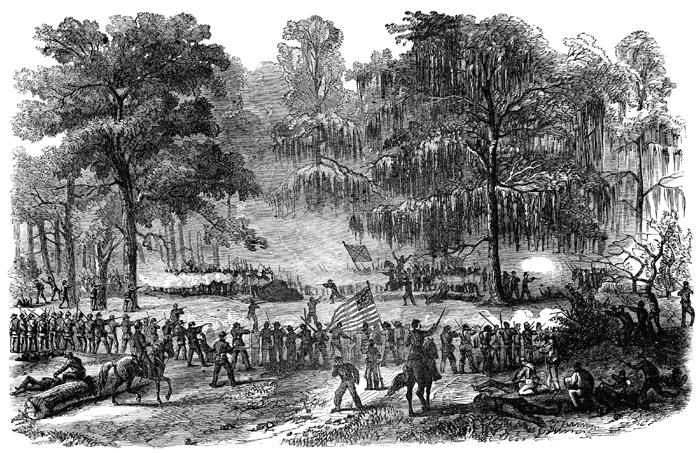
Battle of Bourbeux sketch is from Leslie's Illustrated.

On 7 June 1863, in the Battle of Milliken's Bend, McCulloch's 1,500 soldiers attacked 1,061 Union troops under Colonel Hermann Lieb. The Union force was made up of elements of the 1st Mississippi (African), 8th Louisiana (African), 9th Louisiana (African), 11th Louisiana (African), 13th Louisiana (African), and 23rd Iowa Infantry Regiments. (Note: The 13th Louisiana was never authorized and disbanded one month later (Dobak, p. 183). All the "African" regiments except for the 13th were later taken into United States service (Dobak, p. 179).) Of these, about 900 were Black soldiers, while there were fewer than 200 white soldiers in the 23rd Iowa. Because the Black soldiers were poorly trained, their first volley mostly missed and the Texans were able to come to grips with them. For a short time, the Union soldiers held the levee in a wild melee of bayonets and musket butts, before running to the safety of the riverbank. The Union gunboat USS Choctaw shelled the levee, keeping McCulloch's men from following up their advantage. When the USS Lexington arrived on the scene, McCulloch halted the attack. The Federals sustained 652 casualties while the Confederates lost 185. Randal's brigade came up in support, but by the time it arrived, the fighting was done.

Afterward, Walker's division camped near Delhi, Louisiana, where disease ravaged the ranks, reducing the number of men fit for duty. The division marched south to Alexandria, where it remained until 10 August. The division moved to confront a Union expedition led by Major General William B. Franklin that was marching north. On 23 October, Franklin's force seized Washington, Louisiana. Taylor massed his 11,000 available troops for battle near Washington, but Franklin's superior force retreated. Taylor created an ad hoc brigade under Colonel Oran Milo Roberts, which included the 11th Texas, 15th Texas, and 18th Texas Infantry Regiments, and sent it to assist Brigadier General Thomas Green's cavalry division. On 3 November 1863, the three Texas infantry regiments fought a skillful action at the Battle of Bayou Bourbeux. Green sent Roberts' brigade to attack the Federals from the north, while cavalry brigades led by Colonels Arthur P. Bagby Jr. and James Patrick Major took position on Roberts' right. Roberts' 950-man brigade formed with the 15th Texas on the right, the 18th in the center, and the 11th on the left. After a three-hour clash, the Union force under Brigadier General Stephen G. Burbridge was forced back with losses of 200 killed and wounded, and 600 captured. Roberts' brigade lost 21 killed, 82 wounded, and 38 prisoners. The 11th Texas reported losses of 4 killed, 15 wounded, and 32 missing out of a total of 355 men present for duty.

=== 1864–1865 ===
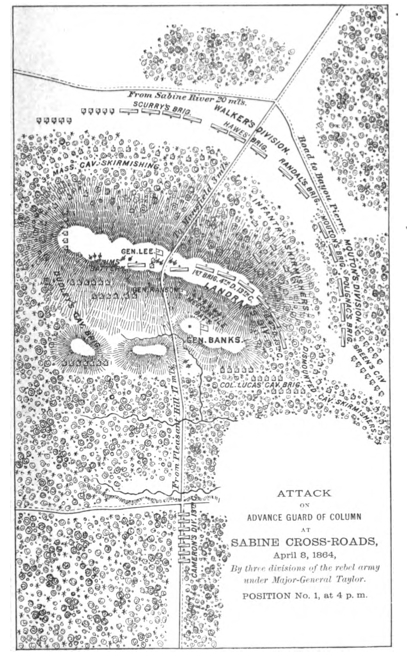
Battle of Mansfield, 8 April 1864

The brigade of Randal went into quarters at Marksville, Louisiana, in winter 1863–1864. On 20 January 1864, the 11th Texas was pitted against the 12th Texas Infantry Regiment in a match-drill which the 11th Texas won. In the Red River campaign, a 26,000-man Union army led by Major General Nathaniel P. Banks and supported by 13 gunboats tried to move up the river to capture Shreveport. At the Battle of Mansfield on 8 April 1864, Taylor assembled 11,000 soldiers in the infantry divisions of Walker and Brigadier General Alfred Mouton, and Green's cavalry division. Walker's division was deployed on the west side of the main highway with Brigadier General William R. Scurry's brigade on the right, Brigadier General Thomas N. Waul's brigade in the center, and Randal's brigade on the left. Mouton's division was on the east side of the highway. At 4 pm, Taylor ordered an assault which overwhelmed the Federals. In the rout, Banks' forces lost an estimated 200 killed, 900 wounded, 1,800 missing, 20 guns, and 250 wagons. Confederate casualties were about 1,000. This battle marked the limit of Banks' advance. At Mansfield, the 11th Texas lost 2 killed, 6 wounded, and 2 missing.

On 9 April 1864, Taylor, reinforced to a strength of 14,300 troops, attacked Banks' Union army at the Battle of Pleasant Hill. Walker's division attacked the Federal right flank but was repulsed. Confederate attacks on the Federal left flank were initially successful, but were finally beaten back. Both armies retreated, the Confederates after losing 1,500 casualties and the Federals after losing 1,369 casualties. At Pleasant Hill, the 11th Texas lost 3 killed and 18 wounded. Walker's division was then ordered to march north into Arkansas to drive off another Federal invading force. At the Battle of Jenkins' Ferry on 30 April, Confederate Lieutenant General Edmund Kirby Smith attacked the retreating Union force under Major General Frederick Steele. Smith ordered an attack but the Union soldiers drove back every assault. Walker's division arrived last and was immediately thrown into action, but it was also defeated. Scurry's brigade arrived first and fought for 40 minutes until Waul's brigade arrived, and Randal's brigade came last. Both Scurry and Randal were fatally wounded, and casualties among the rank and file were serious. The 11th Texas suffered losses of 9 killed and 39 wounded. Steele's force escaped to Little Rock, Arkansas. Brigadier General Robert Plunket Maclay assumed command of the 2nd Brigade.

On 17 June 1864, Major General John Horace Forney replaced Walker in command of the division. On 19 October 1864, Roberts resigned because of bad health, and was replaced in command of the 11th Texas Infantry by James M. Jones. On 18 February 1865, Forney's division marched to Shreveport where the soldiers put on a military review and enjoyed a hearty meal hosted by the townspeople. In late February 1865, Forney's division was expanded by several regiments and a new 4th Brigade was created. Sometime in early 1865, the 11th Texas may have guarded Union prisoners at Tyler, Texas. On 5 March, the division was ordered to march to Hempstead, Texas, and arrived there near Camp Groce on 15 April. By 19 May most of the soldiers had dispersed to their homes, though the official surrender date for the Trans-Mississippi Department was 26 May 1865.

== Notes ==
Footnotes

Citations
