= 28th Texas Cavalry Regiment =

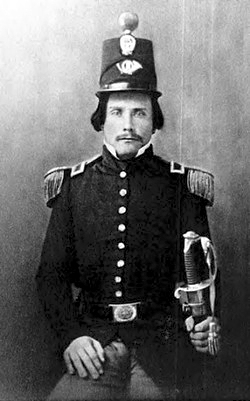
- Horace Randal, shown wearing a pre-war US Army uniform, was the regiment's first colonel.
- Active: May 1862 – 26 May 1865
- Country: Confederate States of America
- Allegiance: Confederate States of America, Texas
- Branch: Confederate States Army
- Type: Cavalry and Infantry
- Size: Regiment
- Engagements: American Civil War; Battle of Milliken's Bend (1863); Battle of Mansfield (1864); Battle of Pleasant Hill (1864); Battle of Jenkins' Ferry (1864)

Commanders
- Notable commanders: Horace Randal

The 28th Texas Cavalry Regiment was a unit of mounted volunteers recruited in east Texas that fought in the Confederate States Army during the American Civil War. In May 1862, the regiment entered Confederate service and served the entire war west of the Mississippi River in the region known as the Trans-Mississippi Department. The unit was soon dismounted before being assigned to the 2nd Brigade of the all-Texas infantry division known as Walker's Greyhounds. In 1863, the regiment played a secondary role at Milliken's Bend. The regiment fought in three major battles during April 1864, at Mansfield, Pleasant Hill, and Jenkins' Ferry. The Trans-Mississippi Department surrendered on 26 May 1865, but the survivors dispersed to their homes before that date.

== Formation ==
The 28th Texas Cavalry Regiment was organized and enrolled in Confederate service in May 1862. The regiment originally consisted of 1,021 men in 12 companies, though a muster roll from 1863 (see below) only showed 10 companies, from A to K, excluding J. Compared to regiments formed at the beginning of the conflict, the recruits were older, more likely to be married, less wealthy, and less likely to own slaves. The soldiers hailed from Anderson, Cass, Cherokee, Freestone, Harrison, Houston, Panola, Polk, Shelby, Smith, Trinity, and Upshur Counties. In order to secure enough weapons, an advertisement was published in the Texas Republican newspaper in Marshall, Texas. The field officers were Colonel Horace Randal, Lieutenant Colonel Eli H. Baxter, and Major H. G. Hall. Other regimental staff were Surgeon W. P. Smith, Assistant Surgeon E. W. Ceade, Quartermaster N. P. Ward, and Adjutant George T. Howard.

Captains of the 28th Texas Cavalry Regiment (1863)
Company	Captain
A	W. A. Jemison
B	P. Henry
C	A. W. D. Berry
D	J. M. Scott
E	O. M. Doty
F	Theophilus Perry
G	W. F. Roberts
H	J. C. Means
I	J. A. McLemore
K	W. H. Rumsey

== Service ==
=== 1862 ===
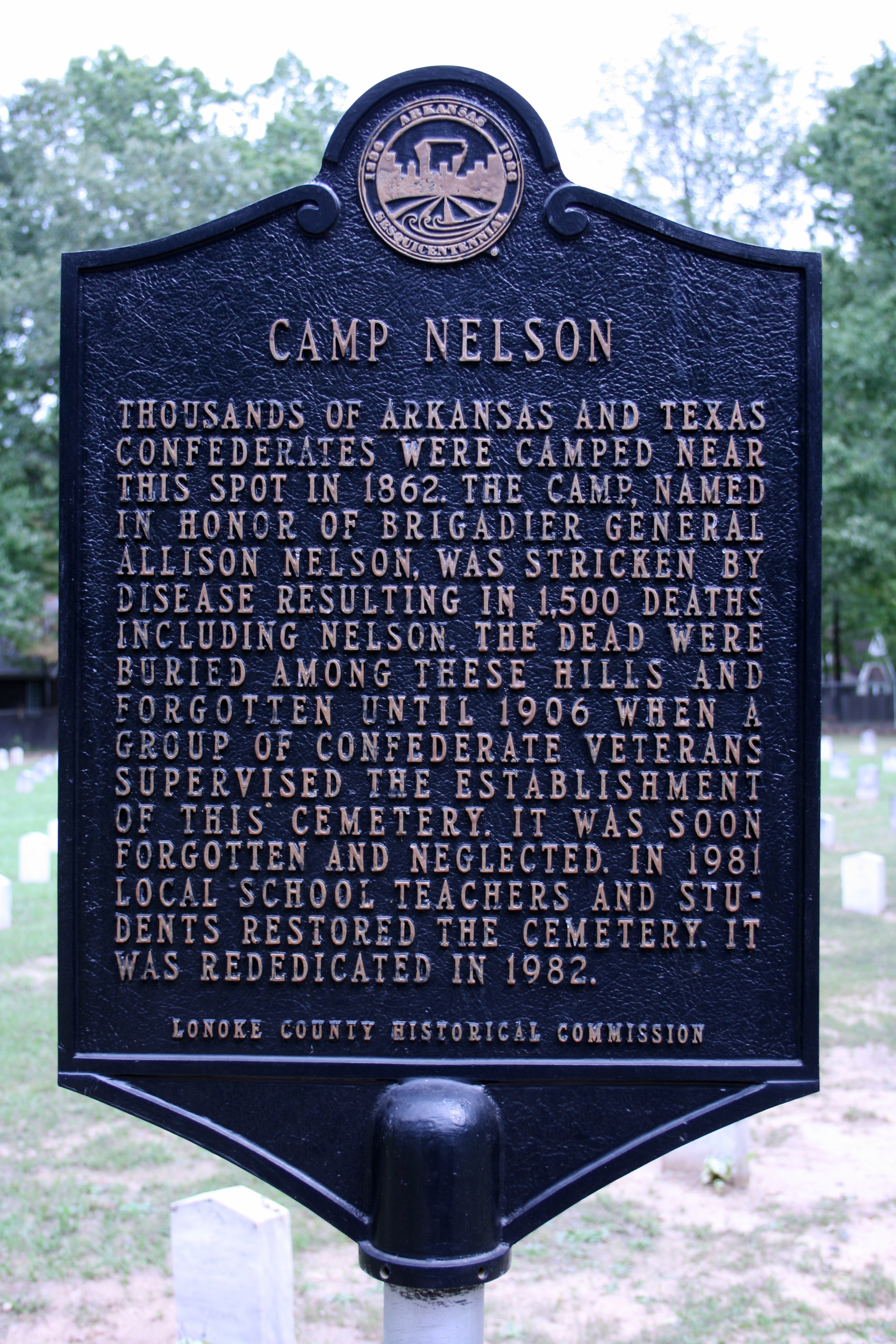
Camp Nelson

By mid-September 1862, the 28th Texas Cavalry was in Arkansas, with about 1,000 men under the command of Randal. When the Confederacy began conscription, many men considered it to be shameful to be drafted, and they volunteered. Since most enlisted in cavalry units, there were not enough foot soldiers. Therefore, the authorities ordered many cavalry regiments to be dismounted to serve as infantry. On 28 September, the 28th Texas Cavalry was ordered to give up their horses and join an infantry brigade. Dismounting was resented by the rank and file, and many men complained, to no avail. The Texas regiments marched to Camp Nelson near Austin, Arkansas. The camp was named for Texas Brigadier General Allison Nelson who died a few days before the soldiers arrived there. Diseases swept through the camp killing about 1,500 men in late 1862. The 28th Texas Cavalry lost 78 men during this period.

While at Camp Nelson, the Texas units were organized into a division under Brigadier General Henry E. McCulloch, and the 28th Texas Cavalry regiment was assigned to the 2nd Brigade. The other units in the brigade were the 11th Texas Infantry and 14th Texas Infantry Regiments, Robert S. Gould's 6th Texas Cavalry Battalion (dismounted), and J. M. Daniel's Texas Battery. Randal was appointed commander of 2nd Brigade, so Lieutenant Colonel Baxter assumed command of the regiment. (Note: Gould's was the 6th Texas Cavalry Battalion. (Oates, p. 28)) Later, McCulloch was replaced by Major General John George Walker and the division became known as Walker's Greyhounds. McCulloch then took command of the 3rd Brigade. The division originally had four brigades, but the 4th Brigade was soon detached and captured by Union forces at the Battle of Arkansas Post. The 4th Brigade soldiers were subsequently released by a prisoner exchange, but never returned to the division; instead they served east of the Mississippi River.

=== 1863 ===
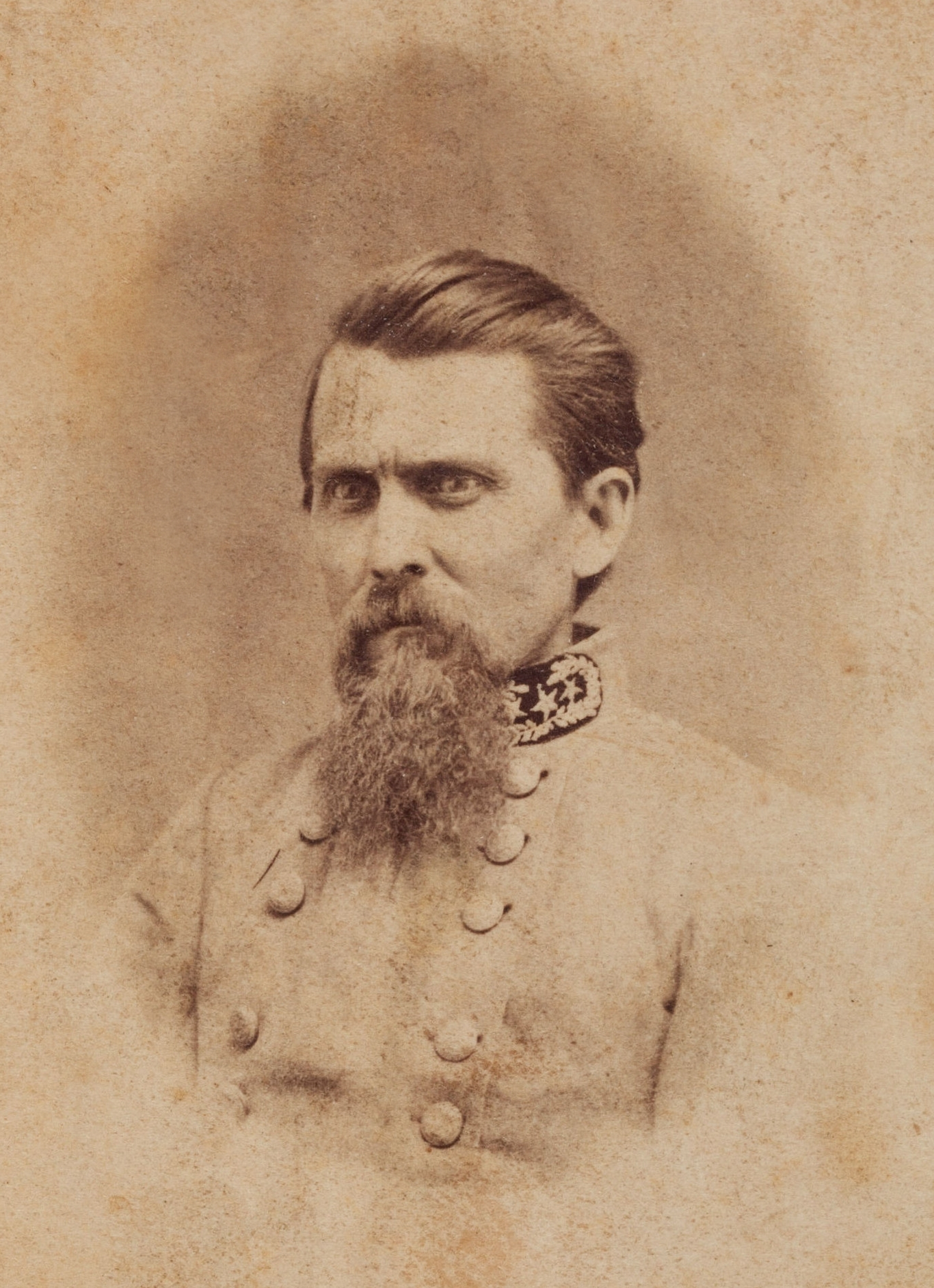
John G. Walker

On 11 January 1863, Walker's division arrived near Pine Bluff, Arkansas, and was immediately ordered to march to the relief of Arkansas Post. However, the next day it was found that the place already surrendered. The troops stayed a week in a place they remembered as "Camp Freeze-Out" because of the extremely cold weather. On 19 January, the division marched back to Pine Bluff where they went into winter quarters in more hospitable surroundings. On 23 April, the division broke camp and began to march to Monroe, Louisiana. In mid-May, Walker's division marched from Monroe to Campti, and then went by steamer on the Red River from Campti to Alexandria. On 31 May, the division reached Perkins' Landing which its Federal garrison quickly evacuated after skirmishing with McCulloch's 3rd Brigade. Confederate losses were 1 killed and 6 wounded.

The Confederate authorities ordered Lieutenant General Richard Taylor, the commander in Louisiana, to help the Confederate army trapped in the Siege of Vicksburg. Taylor directed Walker to take his division to Richmond, Louisiana, and attack Union camps on the west bank of the Mississippi River. Walker's division reached Richmond on the morning of 6 June where information was received that underestimated the strength of the Federals at Milliken's Bend and Young's Point. That night, Walker's troops marched to Oak Grove Plantation where the road forked. Walker ordered Brigadier General James Morrison Hawes' brigade to use the right fork to Young's Point and McCulloch's brigade to use the left fork toward Milliken's Bend. Walker held Randal's brigade at Oak Grove as a reserve.

On 7 June 1863, in the Battle of Milliken's Bend, McCulloch's 1,500 soldiers attacked 1,061 Union troops under Colonel Hermann Lieb. Lieb's command included 900 Black soldiers plus some white soldiers from the 23rd Iowa Infantry Regiment. Despite the Black soldiers being poorly trained, they put up a spirited fight before fleeing to the riverbank. The Union gunboat USS Choctaw shelled the levee, keeping McCulloch's men from pursuing the Federal infantry. When the USS Lexington arrived on the scene, McCulloch decided to suspend the attack. The Federals suffered 652 casualties while the Confederates lost 185. In response to McCulloch's appeal, Randal's brigade came forward to help, but by the time it arrived, the battle was over.

Walker's division bivouacked near Delhi, Louisiana, where illness reduced the number of men fit for duty. The division then marched south to Alexandria, where it stayed until 10 August. The division moved south to oppose a Union expedition under Major General William B. Franklin that was marching north along Bayou Teche. On 23 October, Franklin's force reached as far north as Washington, Louisiana. Taylor gathered 11,000 troops for battle north of Washington, but Franklin's numerically superior force suddenly withdrew. Three Texas infantry regiments, including two from Walker's division, helped win the Battle of Bayou Bourbeux on 3 November, but the 28th Texas Cavalry was not engaged. The Union force under Brigadier General Stephen G. Burbridge was forced back with losses of 200 killed and wounded, and 600 captured. The Texas infantry lost 21 killed, 82 wounded, and 38 prisoners. At the end of 1863, the 28th Texas Cavalry still had not fought in a major battle.

=== 1864–1865 ===
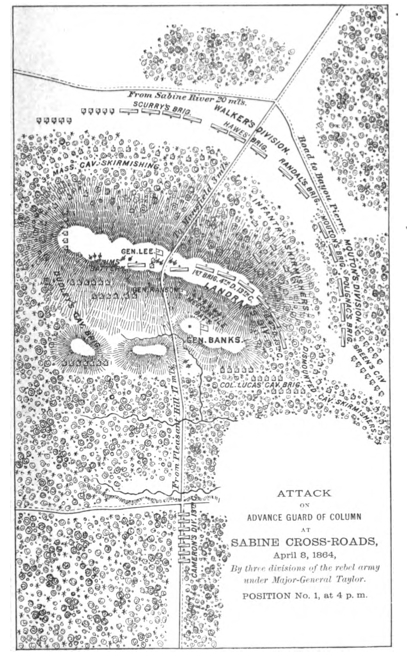
Battle of Mansfield, 8 April 1864

Randal's brigade went into its 1863–1864 winter quarters at Marksville, Louisiana. In the Red River campaign, a 26,000-strong Union army under Major General Nathaniel P. Banks and 13 gunboats tried to move up the river to capture Shreveport. At the Battle of Mansfield on 8 April 1864, Taylor massed 11,000 soldiers in the infantry divisions of Walker and Brigadier General Alfred Mouton, and Brigadier General Thomas Green's cavalry division. Walker's division deployed on the west side of the main road with Brigadier General William R. Scurry's brigade on the right, Brigadier General Thomas N. Waul's brigade in the center, and Randal's brigade on the left. Mouton's division lined up on the east side of the road. At 4 pm, Taylor ordered an assault which overran the Federal defenses. Banks' forces lost an estimated 200 killed, 900 wounded, 1,800 missing, 20 guns, and 250 wagons in the rout. Confederate casualties were about 1,000. Also known as Sabine Cross Roads, the battle marked the farthest limit of Banks' advance. At Mansfield, the 28th Texas Cavalry lost 4 killed and 17 wounded.

On 9 April 1864, Taylor, reinforced to a strength of 14,300 troops, again attacked Banks' Union army at the Battle of Pleasant Hill. Walker's division charged the Federal right flank but was repulsed. Confederate attacks on the Union left flank were initially successful, but were ultimately defeated. Both armies retreated, the Confederates after losing 1,500 casualties and the Federals after losing 1,369 casualties. At Pleasant Hill, the 28th Texas Cavalry lost 9 killed, 44 wounded, and 2 missing. Walker's division was then ordered to march north into Arkansas to drive off another Federal invading force.

At the Battle of Jenkins' Ferry on 30 April, Confederate Lieutenant General Edmund Kirby Smith attacked the retreating Union column under Major General Frederick Steele. However, the well-positioned Union soldiers drove back every assault. Walker's division arrived last and was immediately thrown into action, but it was also defeated. Scurry's brigade arrived first and fought alone for 40 minutes until Waul's brigade arrived; Randal's brigade came into action last. Both Scurry and Randal were mortally wounded, and casualties among the rank and file were substantial. The 28th Texas Cavalry sustained losses of 20 killed, 40 wounded, and 2 missing. Afterward, Steele's force retreated to Little Rock, Arkansas. Brigadier General Robert Plunket Maclay replaced Randal in command of the 2nd Brigade.

On 17 June 1864, Major General John Horace Forney assumed command of the division from the popular Walker. The soldiers disliked Forney because he was a strict disciplinarian. On 18 February 1865, Forney's division marched to Shreveport where the soldiers put on a military review and ate a good meal hosted by the townspeople. In late February 1865, Forney's division was expanded by several regiments and a new 4th Brigade was created. Still led by Colonel Baxter, the 28th Texas Cavalry was reassigned to the 4th Brigade which was led by Brigadier General Wilburn H. King. On 5 March, the division was ordered to march to Hempstead, Texas, and reached there on 15 April near Camp Groce. By 19 May most of the soldiers had gone home, though the formal surrender date for the Trans-Mississippi Department was 26 May 1865.

== See also ==
- List of Texas Civil War Confederate units
- Texas in the American Civil War

== Notes ==
Footnotes

Citations
