= Camden Expedition order of battle =

The order of battle for the Camden Expedition includes:

- Camden Expedition order of battle: Confederate
- Camden Expedition order of battle: Union
