= Robert Maclay =

Robert Maclay may refer to:

- Robert Samuel Maclay (1824–1907), American Christian missionary to the Far East
- Robert Maclay (merchant) (1834–1898), American merchant and businessman, with a son of the same name
- Robert Plunket Maclay (1820–1903), Confederate States Army officer
