= Oran Milo Roberts =

Governor of Texas from 1879 to 1883

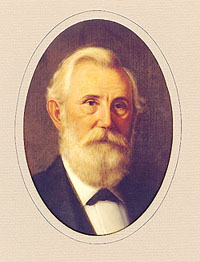

17th Governor of Texas
- In office January 21, 1879 – January 16, 1883
- Lieutenant: Joseph D. Sayers; Leonidas J. Storey
- Preceded by: Richard B. Hubbard
- Succeeded by: John Ireland

Chief Justice of the Supreme Court of Texas
- In office November 1864 – June 1866
- Preceded by: Royall T. Wheeler
- Succeeded by: George F. Moore
- In office January 1874 – 1879
- Preceded by: John David McAdoo
- Succeeded by: George F. Moore

Justice of the Supreme Court of Texas
- In office April 1857 – October 1862
- Preceded by: Abner Smith Lipscomb
- Succeeded by: George F. Moore

Personal details
- Born: July 9, 1815 Laurens County, South Carolina, U.S.
- Died: May 19, 1898 (aged 82) Austin, Texas, U.S.
- Resting place: Oakwood Cemetery
- Party: Democratic
- Spouse(s): Francis Wycliffe Edwards (m. 1837; died 1883) Catherine E. Border (m. 1887)
- Education: University of Alabama
- Profession: Attorney

Military service
- Allegiance: Confederate States
- Branch/service: Confederate States Army
- Rank: Colonel
- Commands: 11th Texas Infantry Regiment
- Battles/wars: American Civil War

Oran Milo Roberts (July 9, 1815 – May 19, 1898) was an American politician and jurist who served as the 17th governor of Texas from 1879 to 1883. Roberts County, Texas is named after him.

== Early life ==
Roberts was born in Laurens District, South Carolina. He studied at the University of Alabama, graduated in 1836, and was admitted to the bar the following year. After serving a term in the Alabama legislature, he moved to Texas, where he opened a successful law practice. In 1844, he was appointed a district attorney by Texas President Sam Houston. In 1846, after Texas had become a state, Roberts was appointed district judge by Governor James Pinckney Henderson. He also served as president of the board and was a well-respected lecturer in law for the University of San Augustine.

In 1856, Roberts ran for and won a position on the Texas Supreme Court. He became a spokesman for states' rights, and when the secessionist crisis appeared in 1860, he was at the center of the pro-Confederate faction.

== American Civil War ==
In January 1861, he was unanimously elected president of the Secession Convention in Austin, Texas, a meeting that he had been influential in calling. Along with his colleagues, Roberts led the passage of the ordinance removing Texas from the Union in 1861. In 1862, he resigned his seat on the bench and entered the Confederate Army and was elected as colonel of the 11th Texas Infantry Regiment with which he served as part of the Walker's Texas Division in the Trans-Mississippi Department during the greater part of the campaigns in Arkansas and Louisiana. In 1864, while he was with his command, Roberts was elected Chief Justice of the Supreme Court. He held the position until he was removed along with other state incumbents in 1865.

== Postbellum ==
During Reconstruction, he was a delegate to the Constitutional Convention of 1866. Along with David G. Burnet, he was elected by the state legislature to the U.S. Senate. However, as the Reconstruction Acts became law, the states were subject to military rule, and none of the delegations of the southern states were seated.

Roberts eventually returned to Gilmer, Texas, where he opened a law school in 1868. Among his students were a future Texas Supreme Court justice, Sawnie Robertson, and a future Dallas district judge, George N. Aldredge.

Upon the ascension of the Democrats to power in Austin in 1874, Roberts was appointed by Governor Richard Coke to his former position of Chief Justice of the Texas Supreme Court. Two years later, under the new Texas Constitution, he was elected to the same position. He served as chief justice for four years and was involved in rewriting much of Texas civil law. He resigned as Chief Justice after receiving a unanimous nomination from the Democratic Convention to run for governor. In 1878, he was elected governor of Texas and served two terms. He was elected governor of Texas on a platform of post-Reconstruction fiscal reform. His two gubernatorial terms were marked by a reduction in state expenditures. His plan for countering the high taxes and state debt of the Reconstruction years became known as "pay as you go." A major part of the plan involved the sale of public lands to finance the debt and to fund public schools. Though ultimately successful in both reducing the debt and increasing the public school fund, the decreased government appropriations under Roberts halted public school growth for a time. The present Capitol in Austin was contracted during Roberts's terms, and the cornerstone for the University of Texas was laid in 1882. Railroad mileage increased across West Texas, and the frontier became more secure.

In 1883, just before Roberts's second term as governor was to end, The University of Texas opened in Austin. After his term, he was appointed professor of law, a position that he held for the next ten years. He was immensely influential in the state's legal profession. His impact on a generation of young attorneys was symbolized by the affectionate title "Old Alcalde" bestowed upon him by his students.

In continuance of that legacy, the University of Texas named its alumni magazine "Alcalde" in his honor and, in 1963, built and named a residence hall after him. During his tenure at the university, Roberts wrote several professional works, among them a text, The Elements of Texas Pleading (1890), which was used for decades after his retirement from teaching. In 1893, he left the university and moved to Marble Falls, where he turned his attention to more general historical writings. Among his works were his essay The Political, Legislative, and Judicial History of Texas for its Fifty Years of Statehood, 1845–1895, which was published in an early general history of the state, Comprehensive History of Texas, 1685 to 1897 (1898), edited by Dudley G. Wooten; and chapters on Texas in volume eleven of C. A. Evans's Confederate Military History (1899). He participated in forming the Texas State Historical Association and served as its first president. He died in Austin, Texas, on May 19, 1898.

== Family ==
Roberts was married to Frances W. Edwards of Ashville, Alabama, from 1837 until her death in 1883. They were the parents of seven children. In 1887, Roberts married Mrs. Catherine E. Border. He is buried at the Oakwood Cemetery in Austin, Texas.

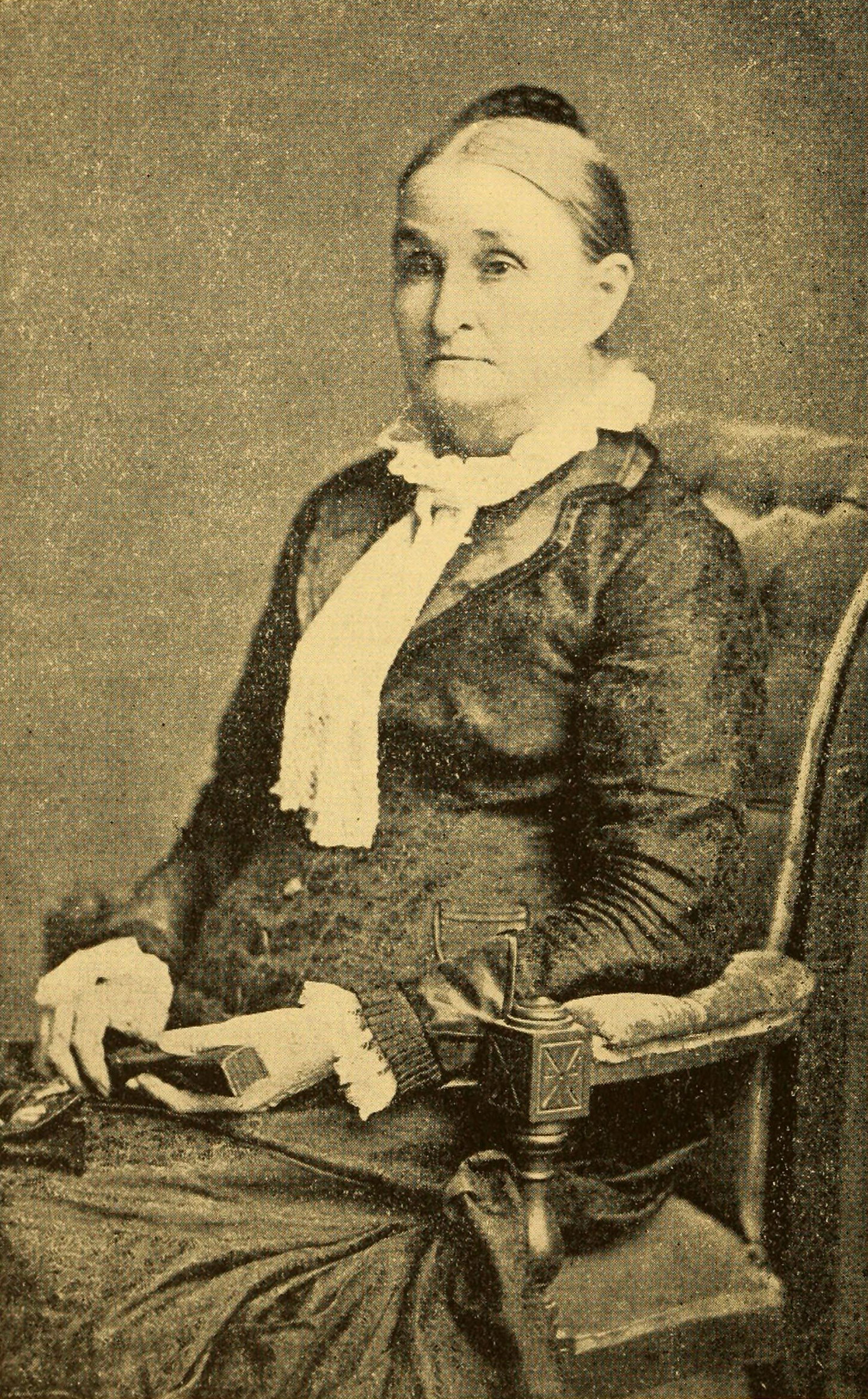
Frances Edwards Roberts

Party political offices
| Preceded by Richard Coke | Democratic nominee for Governor of Texas; 1878, 1880 | Succeeded by John Ireland |
Political offices
| Preceded by Richard B. Hubbard | Governor of Texas; 1879–1883 | Succeeded by John Ireland |
