= Greyhound Division =

Greyhound Division may refer to:

- Walker's Greyhounds, a Confederate States Army division during the American Civil War
- 116th Panzer Division (Wehrmacht), a German Army division during World War II
