= Walker's Greyhounds =

Confederate States Army division

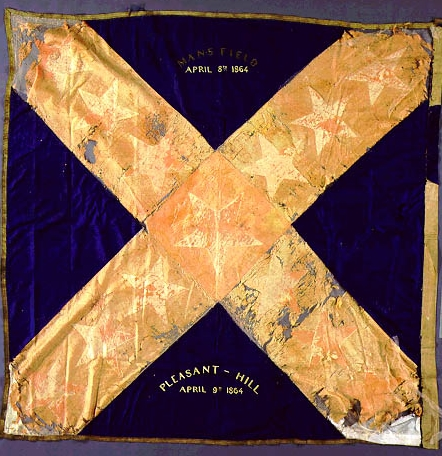
Walker's Texas Division Battle Flag

Walker's Greyhounds was the popular name for a division of the Confederate States Army under Major-General John George Walker, composed exclusively of units from Texas. It fought in the Western Theater and the Trans-Mississippi Department, gaining its nickname because the men were able to move long distances rapidly on foot.

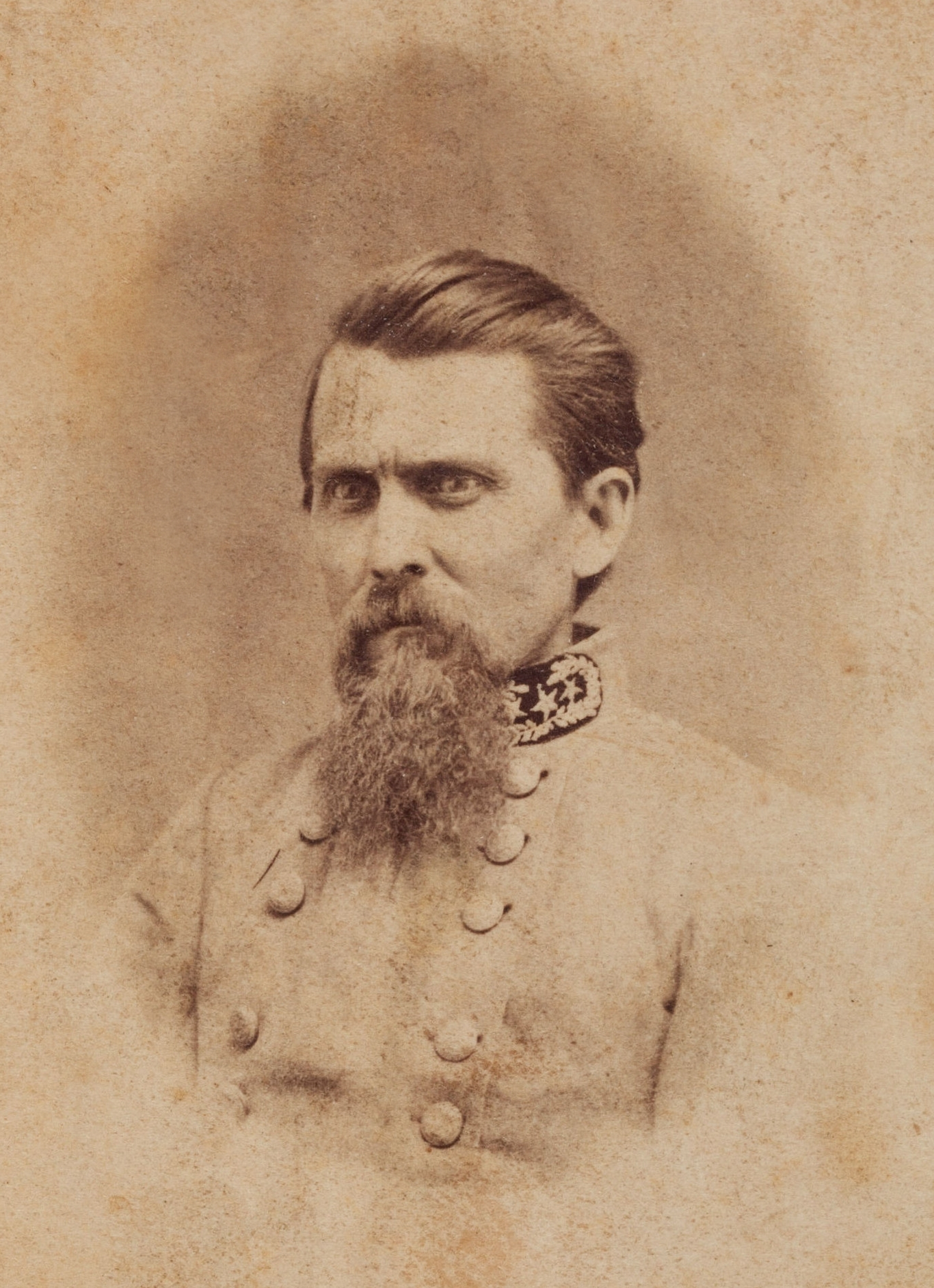
Gen. John George Walker

== Organization ==
Walker's Greyhounds, also known as Walker's Texas Division, was mustered at Camp Nelson, Arkansas, in July 1862. It was placed under the command of Maj. Gen. John George Walker in November 1862, and remained under his command until the end of the war. The division served exclusively in the Trans-Mississippi Department. When General Walker was given a district command in late 1864 the division was given to Maj. Gen. John H. Forney.

=== Composition ===
==== 1st Brigade ====
Col. Overton C. Young
Brig. Gen. James M. Hawes
Brig. Gen. Thomas N. Waul
Brig. Gen. Wilburn H. King
Col. Richard B. Hubbard

- 12th Texas Infantry Regiment - Also known as Young's 8th Regiment.
- 18th Texas Infantry Regiment - Transferred to the 4th Brigade in 1865.
- 22nd Texas Infantry Regiment
- 13th Texas Cavalry Regiment (Dismounted)
- 29th Texas Cavalry Regiment (Dismounted) - Joined brigade in 1865.
- Halderman's Texas Battery

==== 2nd Brigade ====
Brig. Gen. Horace Randal
Brig. Gen. Robert Plunket Maclay

- 11th Texas Infantry Regiment
- 14th Texas Infantry Regiment
- 28th Texas Cavalry Regiment (Dismounted) - Transferred to the 4th Brigade in 1865.
- 6th (Gould's) Texas Cavalry Battalion (Dismounted)
- Daniel's Texas Battery

==== 3rd Brigade ====
Col. George M. Flournoy
Brig. Gen. Henry E. McCulloch
Brig. Gen. William R. Scurry
Brig. Gen. Richard Waterhouse

- 16th Texas Infantry Regiment - Transferred to the 4th Brigade in 1865.
- 17th Texas Infantry Regiment
- 19th Texas Infantry Regiment
- 16th Texas Cavalry Regiment (Dismounted)
- 2nd Texas Partisan Rangers Regiment - Joined brigade in 1865.
- 3rd Texas Infantry Regiment - Served only during the Red River campaign.
- 1st Texas Field Battery (Edgar's)

==== Original 4th Brigade ====
Brig. Gen. James Deshler

- 10th Texas Infantry Regiment
- 15th Texas Cavalry Regiment (Dismounted)
- 18th Texas Cavalry Regiment (Dismounted)
- 25th Texas Cavalry Regiment (Dismounted)

==== 4th Brigade (1865) ====
Brig. Gen. Wilburn H. King

- 16th Texas Infantry Regiment
- 18th Texas Infantry Regiment
- 28th Texas Cavalry Regiment (Dismounted)
- 34th Texas Cavalry Regiment (Dismounted)
- Wells' Texas Cavalry Regiment

== Major engagements ==
=== Vicksburg Campaign ===
The Greyhounds fought at the Battle of Milliken's Bend and the Battle of Young's Point, incidental engagements of the Vicksburg Campaign, in June 1863. They remained in northern Louisiana for several months, and then returned to Arkansas in late 1863.

=== Red River Campaign ===
Sent from Arkansas to Louisiana again in April 1864, they served as part of Lt. Gen. Richard Taylor's Army at the significant Confederate victories at the Battle of Mansfield (April 8, 1864), and the Battle of Pleasant Hill (April 9, 1864), critical engagements in the Red River Campaign.

=== Camden Expedition ===
Rushed back to Arkansas by Trans-Mississippi Department Commander Edmund Kirby Smith, they fought at the Battle of Jenkins' Ferry on April 30, 1864, the last engagement of the Camden Expedition.

== Mustered out ==
In March 1865 the division was ordered to Hempstead, Texas. There it was awaiting the arrival of Confederate President Jefferson Davis in order to make a Last Stand. Davis failed to arrive, and with the main Confederate armies having surrendered and the war essentially being over, the approximately 8,000 soldiers constituting the remnants of the much depleted division simply went home from Hempstead in late May 1865.

== See also ==
- Texas Civil War Confederate Units

== Bibliography ==
- Lowe, Richard G., Walker's Texas Division, Louisiana State University Press, 2004.
- Blessington, Joseph P. (1875). The Campaigns of Walker's Texas Division. New York: Lange, Little & Co.
