= Robert Plunket Maclay =

Confederate States Army major (1820–1903)

- Born: February 19, 1820; Armagh, Pennsylvania
- Died: May 20, 1903 (aged 83); Pointe Coupee Parish, Louisiana
- Burial place: Fordoche, Louisiana
- Military career
- Allegiance: United States of America; Confederate States of America
- Branch: United States Army; Louisiana Militia; Confederate States Army
- Service years: 1840–1860; 1861–1862; 1862–1865
- Rank: Captain (USA); Major (Louisiana Militia); Major (CSA); Assigned to duty as: Brigadier General
- Units: 8th US Infantry; Pointe Coupee Militia Regiment
- Commands: 1st Brigade / Walker's Texas Division; 2nd Brigade / Walker's Texas Division
- Conflicts: Seminole Wars; Mexican–American War; American Civil War
- Other work: planter

Robert Plunket Maclay (February 19, 1820 – May 20, 1903) was a Confederate States Army major during the American Civil War (Civil War). On May 13, 1864, he was assigned to duty as a brigadier general to rank from April 30, 1864, by General E. Kirby Smith. He was never officially appointed by Confederate President Jefferson Davis, nor confirmed by the Confederate Senate to that grade.

== Early life ==
Robert Plunket Maclay was born in Armagh, Mifflin County, Pennsylvania, on February 19, 1820. His parents were Samuel Plunket Maclay and Elizabeth (Johnston) Maclay. His grandfather and granduncle were United States Senators. An uncle was a United States Congressman.

Maclay attended Lewiston Academy after which he became a cadet at the United States Military Academy at West Point, New York, in 1836. He graduated in the class of 1840, ranking 32nd of 42 class members. He was assigned as a second lieutenant to the 8th United States Infantry Regiment. He fought in the Second Seminole War in the early 1840s.

As an officer with Major General Zachary Taylor's forces, Maclay was wounded at the Battle of Resaca de la Palma, Texas, on May 9, 1846, at the start of the Mexican–American War. To help him recuperate, Maclay was sent home on recruiting duty. He returned to the army in time to participate in garrison duty defending Puebla, Puebla which the U.S. Army occupied in 1847 and left at the end of the war in 1848.

On January 22, 1849, Maclay was promoted to captain. He was on garrison duty in Texas for eleven years and was for a time the commander of Fort Inge.

Maclay married Virginia Medora Nutt in 1853. She died in 1856 and he inherited plantations in Louisiana and Mississippi from her. Maclay resigned as captain in the U.S. Army on December 31, 1860, in order to manage his Louisiana properties.

== American Civil War service ==
Robert P. Maclay was born in the North and had relatives in the Union Army. Nonetheless, he sympathized with his neighbors and in-laws in the South. He joined the Pointe Coupee Militia Regiment of the Louisiana Militia as a captain on December 16, 1861. He was appointed major and inspector general of the 6th Louisiana Militia Brigade on March 1, 1862.

It was not until October 31, 1862, that Maclay was appointed to a position in the Confederate States Army as major of artillery under the new head of the Confederate Trans-Mississippi Department, Lieutenant General Theophilus H. Holmes. Holmes assigned Maclay to the staff of Major General John George Walker, commander of an infantry division from Texas, on January 2, 1863. Maclay was assistant adjutant general and inspector general for Walker and later became chief of staff for the division, which fought in Louisiana and Arkansas at the Battle of Milliken's Bend, Red River Campaign, and Battle of Jenkins' Ferry in 1863 and 1864.

General E. Kirby Smith succeeded Holmes as commander of the Trans-Mississippi Army on January 14, 1863, and as commander of the Trans-Mississippi Department on February 9, 1863. General Smith assigned Maclay to duty as a brigadier general on May 13, 1864, to rank from April 30, 1864. Despite Smith having no authority to promote or appoint officers to general officer grade, Smith gave Maclay command of the 1st (Waul's) Brigade in John G. Walker's division. Later, Smith gave Maclay command of Horace Randal's division. Maclay was never appointed by Confederate President Jefferson Davis or confirmed by the Confederate Senate.

Smith's appointment of a staff major to brigade command over various colonels caused dissatisfaction despite Maclay being held in high regard by his men. In January 1865, Smith gave Maclay a 60-day leave of absence in order to deal with the situation. There is no record that Maclay ever returned to duty.

== Aftermath ==
After the war, Maclay returned to his Mississippi and Louisiana properties as a planter. He lived near New Roads, Louisiana, in Pointe Coupee Parish and was active in the Episcopal Church.

Robert Plunket Maclay died on May 20, 1903, at the home of his daughter, Levy Plantation in Pointe Coupee Parish. He is buried near Fordoche, Louisiana.

== See also ==
- List of American Civil War generals (Acting Confederate)
