= 1880 Texas gubernatorial election =

- November 2, 1880
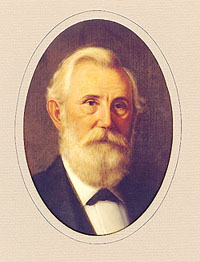

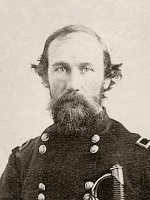

Candidate	Oran Milo Roberts	Edmund J. Davis	W. H. Hamman
Party	Democratic	Republican	Greenback
Popular vote	166,101	64,382	33,721
Percentage	62.87%	24.37%	12.76%
County results
Roberts
40–50%
50–60%
60–70%
70–80%
80–90%
90–100%
Davis
40–50%
50–60%
60–70%
70–80%
80–90%
Hamman
50–60%
No returns (Note: Counties which were not yet organized are shaded a lighter grey.)
Governor before election
Oran Milo Roberts
Democratic
Governor-elect
Oran Milo Roberts
Democratic

The 1880 Texas gubernatorial election was held to elect the governor of Texas. Governor Oran Milo Roberts was re-elected to a second term in office over former Governor Edmund J. Davis.

== General election ==
The Greenback Party, motivated by their success in the previous election in which they won twelve seats in the legislature and elected George W. Jones to Congress, renominated W. H. Hamman to be their candidate for governor.

There was factional split in the Republican party, but it was resolved at the party convention with former governor and Republican party chair Edmund Davis being selected as the gubenatorial nominee.

At the time Texas was a part of the "Solid South" and the Democratic party was heavily favored in state elections. Incumbent Oran Roberts was renominated at the state convention, after facing a challenge from lieutenant governor Joseph Sayers, and was reelected by a wide margin.

=== Candidates ===
- Dr. Archelaus M. Cochran, internal revenue collector, former postmaster, former member of the Dallas City Council, former state representative, Captain in Terry's Texas Rangers (Republican) (withdrawn)
- Edmund J. Davis, former governor (Republican)
- William H. Hamman, oil pioneer, 1878 nominee, and former Confederate brigadier general (Greenback)
- Oran Milo Roberts, incumbent governor (Democratic)
- Joseph D. Sayers, incumbent lieutenant governor (Democratic)

=== Results ===
1880 Texas gubernatorial election
Party	Candidate	Votes	%	±%
Democratic	Oran M. Roberts (incumbent)	166,101	62.87%	▼3.89
Republican	Edmund J. Davis	64,382	24.37%	▲14.37
Greenback	William H. Hamman	33,721	12.76%	▼8.44
Total votes		264,204	100.00%	
