= 29th Texas Cavalry Regiment =

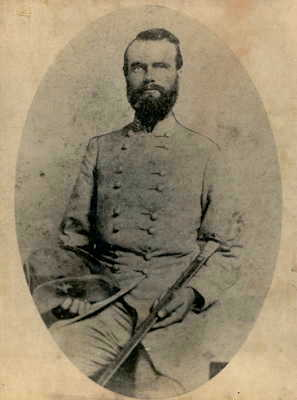
- The regiment served in Richard M. Gano's brigade.
- Active: July 1862 – May 1865
- Country: Confederate States of America
- Allegiance: Confederate States of America, Texas
- Branch: Confederate States Army
- Type: Cavalry
- Size: Regiment
- Engagements: American Civil War; Battle of Honey Springs (1863); Battle of Poison Spring (1864); Second Battle of Cabin Creek (1864)

Commanders
- Notable commanders: Charles DeMorse

The 29th Texas Cavalry Regiment was a unit of mounted volunteers from Texas that fought in the Confederate States Army during the American Civil War. Newspaper publisher Charles DeMorse formed the regiment at Clarksville, Texas, in July 1862 and became its colonel. The unit defended north Texas against Native American raids until March 1863, when it was ordered to march to Indian Territory. In July 1863, the regiment fought at Honey Springs. In October 1863, Richard Montgomery Gano assumed command of the brigade, which was troubled by poor morale and desertions. Gano's brigade moved to Arkansas where it fought at Poison Spring in April 1864. The regiment participated in a successful raid at Cabin Creek later that year. In early 1865, the unit was dismounted and added to an infantry division known as Walker's Greyhounds. The division was ordered to march to Hempstead, Texas, where it arrived in April 1865 and disbanded soon afterward.

== See also ==
- List of Texas Civil War Confederate units
