= 22nd Texas Infantry Regiment =

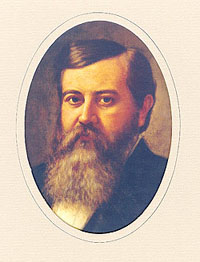
- Richard B. Hubbard was colonel of the 22nd Texas. He was later elected governor (shown here) of Texas.
- Active: 8 August 1862 – 26 May 1865
- Country: Confederate States of America
- Allegiance: Confederate States of America, Texas
- Branch: Confederate States Army
- Type: Infantry
- Size: Regiment
- Nickname: Hubbard's Regiment
- Engagements: American Civil War; Battle of Milliken's Bend (1863); Battle of Mansfield (1864); Battle of Pleasant Hill (1864); Battle of Jenkins' Ferry (1864)

Commanders
- Notable commanders: Richard B. Hubbard

The 22nd Texas Infantry Regiment was a unit of volunteers recruited in Texas that fought in the Confederate States Army during the American Civil War. In August 1862, the regiment was enrolled in Confederate service, and for its entire career served west of the Mississippi River in the region known as the Trans-Mississippi Department. The unit was assigned to the 1st Brigade of the Texas infantry division known as Walker's Greyhounds. In 1863, the regiment played a secondary role at Milliken's Bend. Within the month of April 1864, the regiment fought in three major battles at Mansfield, Pleasant Hill, and Jenkins' Ferry. Though the formal surrender occurred on 26 May 1865, the soldiers disbanded to their homes before that date.

== Service ==
On 16 October 1864, Captain John Guynes of Company F was shot for encouraging his soldiers to desert. He was motivated by the belief that the regiment was going to transfer to the east bank of the Mississippi River. Guynes was popular with his men and respected by other officers, however, appeals to spare his life were denied.
