= Bayou Meto, Lonoke County, Arkansas =

Bayou Meto, Arkansas
- Unincorporated community
- Location within Arkansas Location within the United States
- Coordinates: 34°42′31″N 91°52′18″W
- Country: United States
- State: Arkansas
- County: Lonoke
- Elevation: 223 ft (68 m)
- Time zone: UTC-6 (Central (CST))
  - Summer (DST): UTC-5 (CDT)
- GNIS feature ID: 61176

Bayou Meto is an unincorporated community in Lonoke County, Arkansas, United States. The community is located south of Lonoke. Its time zone is UTC-6 hours. The climate type is a humid subtropical climate, characterized by hot, humid summers and mild winters.
