= 14th Texas Infantry Regiment =

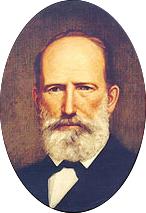
- Edward Clark was colonel of the 14th Texas. Previously, he was governor (shown here) of Texas.
- Active: Early summer 1862 – 26 May 1865
- Country: Confederate States of America
- Allegiance: Confederate States of America, Texas
- Branch: Confederate States Army
- Type: Infantry
- Size: Regiment
- Engagements: American Civil War; Battle of Milliken's Bend (1863); Battle of Bayou Bourbeux (1863); Battle of Mansfield (1864); Battle of Pleasant Hill (1864); Battle of Jenkins' Ferry (1864)

Commanders
- Notable commanders: Edward Clark

The 14th Texas Infantry Regiment was a unit of volunteers recruited in Texas that fought in the Confederate States Army during the American Civil War. The regiment organized in the summer of 1862 and spent its entire existence west of the Mississippi River in the Trans-Mississippi Department. The unit was assigned to the 2nd Brigade of the Texas infantry division known as Walker's Greyhounds. The regiment fought at Milliken's Bend in 1863 and Mansfield, Pleasant Hill, and Jenkins' Ferry in 1864. The regiment's formal surrender date was 26 May 1865, but it had already disbanded in mid-May 1865.
