= 12th Texas Infantry Regiment =

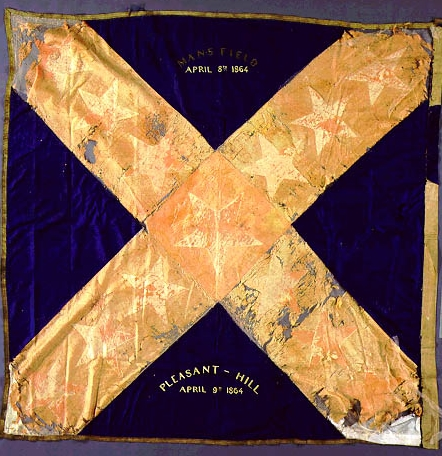
- Battle flag of Walker's Texas Division
- Active: Spring 1862 – 26 May 1865
- Country: Confederate States of America
- Allegiance: Confederate States of America, Texas
- Branch: Confederate States Army
- Type: Infantry
- Size: Regiment
- Nicknames: Young's Regiment, 8th Regiment
- Engagements: American Civil War; Battle of Milliken's Bend (1863); Battle of Mansfield (1864); Battle of Pleasant Hill (1864); Battle of Jenkins' Ferry (1864)

Commanders
- Notable commanders: Overton Young

The 12th Texas Infantry Regiment, sometimes known as the 8th Texas Infantry, was a unit of volunteers recruited in Texas that fought in the Confederate States Army during the American Civil War. In spring 1862, the regiment was enrolled in Confederate service at Waco, Texas, and always remained west of the Mississippi River in the area known as the Trans-Mississippi Department. The unit was assigned to the all-Texas infantry division known as Walker's Greyhounds. In 1863, the regiment played a minor role at Milliken's Bend. In April 1864, the regiment fought in three major battles at Mansfield, Pleasant Hill, and Jenkins' Ferry. The Trans-Mississippi's formal surrender occurred on 26 May 1865, but most of the soldiers dispersed to their homes before that date.
