= Horace Randal =

American Confederate army colonel

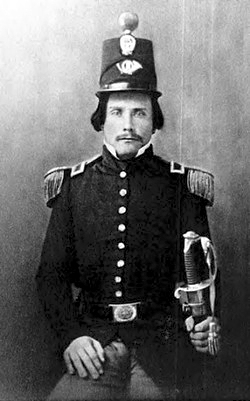
- Born: January 4, 1833; McNairy County, Tennessee
- Died: May 2, 1864 (aged 31); Grant County, Arkansas
- Burial place: Marshall, Texas
- Military career
- Allegiance: United States of America; Confederate States of America
- Branch: United States Army; Confederate States Army
- Service years: 1854–1861 (USA); 1861–1864 (CSA)
- Rank: Second Lieutenant, USA; Colonel, CSA; Assigned to duty as: Brigadier General
- Commands: 28th Texas Cavalry Regiment; 2nd Brigade, Walker's Division
- Conflicts: Apache Wars; American Civil War

Horace Randal (January 4, 1833 – May 2, 1864) was a Confederate States Army colonel during the American Civil War. Randal was mortally wounded while commanding a brigade at the Battle of Jenkins' Ferry, Arkansas, on April 30, 1864, dying two days later. Confederate President Jefferson Davis did not act upon a request made by General E. Kirby Smith on November 8, 1863, to promote Randal to brigadier general. After Randal's performance at the Battle of Mansfield, General Smith, as the Confederate commander of the Trans-Mississippi Department, assigned Randal to duty as a brigadier general on April 13, 1864. Randal was not officially promoted. Jefferson Davis subsequently revoked Smith's appointment of Randal as a brigadier general.

Randal graduated from the United States Military Academy in 1854 and was serving as a second lieutenant and brevet first lieutenant in the U.S. Army when the Deep South states seceded from the Union. Randal resigned from the U.S. Army on February 27, 1861, and was promptly appointed colonel of the 28th Texas Cavalry Regiment.

== Early life ==
Horace Randal was born in McNairy County, Tennessee, on January 4, 1833. His parents, John Leonard Randal and Sarah Kyle Randal, moved the family to Texas in 1838. John Leonard Randal served in the Texas Senate during the Republic of Texas period from 1842-1843.

After five years in attendance, Horace Randal graduated from the United States Military Academy in 1854, ranking 45th out of 46 in the class. Originally assigned to the infantry, Randal transferred to the 1st U.S. Dragoons in 1855. He fought Indians in the Southwest. In 1857, United States Secretary of War Jefferson Davis recommended that Randal receive the rank of brevet first lieutenant for gallant and meritorious conduct in the conflict with the Apaches.

Randal married first Julia Bassett, then Nannie E. Taylor.

Randal was in Washington, DC, during the week before Abraham Lincoln was inaugurated as President of the United States. The U.S. Army's General-in-chief, Brevet Lieutenant General Winfield Scott, offered Randal a Regular Army commission as major. Randal decided to go with his home state of Texas into the Confederacy. He resigned from the U.S. Army on February 27, 1861.

== American Civil War service ==
Randal was commissioned a first lieutenant in the Army of the Confederate States, the regular army of the Confederacy, on March 26, 1861, to rank from March 16, 1861. By April 25, 1861, when Randal was ordered to report to General Braxton Bragg at Pensacola, Florida, to serve as quartermaster on Bragg's staff. Randal, however, complained to President Davis that others who were junior to him in the U.S. Army had been given higher grades or ranks and resigned.

Randal intended to return to Texas to raise a regiment for the Confederate Army. At the request of his brother-in-law, Major General Gustavus Woodson Smith, he remained in northern Virginia as a volunteer aide on Smith's staff. Although Jefferson Davis was reluctant to reappoint an officer who had recently resigned, he was persuaded by Smith to appoint Randal as a lieutenant and aide to Smith. He became a favorite officer of General Joseph E. Johnston while acting as inspector general of G. W. Smith's corps during the winter of 1861–1862.

Randal was authorized to raise a regiment of cavalry in Texas on December 19, 1861. Randal was known by his contemporaries, such as his West Point roommate John Bell Hood, as an excellent horseman. On February 12, 1862, he returned to Texas to take command of the new 28th Texas Cavalry Regiment, which most often fought dismounted. By December 1862, Randal commanded a brigade under Brigadier General Henry McCulloch.

Randal's brigade was held in reserve at the Battle of Milliken's Bend during the Siege of Vicksburg.

General E. Kirby Smith recommended that Randal be promoted to brigadier general on November 8, 1863. No action was taken on the request. Historian Bruce S. Allardice says this was because the brigade was well below brigade strength at the time.

At the Battle of Mansfield, April 8, 1864, during the Red River Campaign, Randal's brigade broke the Union line and took about 500 prisoners and the Union Army wagon train while leading the pursuit of the fleeing Federal force. On April 13, 1864, General E. Kirby Smith appointed Randal to duty as a brigadier general. Randal and his brigade also performed with distinction at the Battle of Pleasant Hill on April 9, 1864.

Randal was mortally wounded while leading a charge at the Battle of Jenkins' Ferry, the culmination of the Union Camden Expedition under Major General Frederick Steele, which was part of Major General Nathaniel P. Banks's larger Red River Campaign, on April 30, 1864. He died on May 2, 1864, and initially was buried near the battlefield.

== Aftermath and legacy ==
At a later date, Horace Randal's remains were removed to Old Marshall Cemetery in Marshall, Texas. Despite the misspelling, Randall County, Texas, is named for Horace Randal.

== See also ==
- List of American Civil War generals (Acting Confederate)
