= Henry Eustace McCulloch =

American politician

Brigadier General Henry Eustace McCulloch
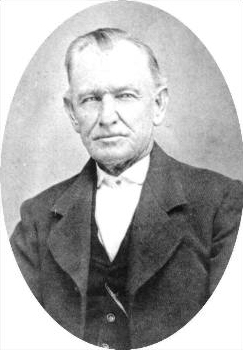
- Born: December 6, 1816; Rutherford County, Tennessee
- Died: March 12, 1895 (aged 78); Rockport, Texas
- Burial place: San Geronimo Cemetery in Seguin, Texas
- Spouse: Jane Isabella Ashby
- Military career
- Allegiance: Republic of Texas; Confederate States of America
- Branch: (Republic of Texas) Texas State Militia; Confederate States Army
- Service years: 1839–1842 (Texas Army); 1846–1847 (Texas Militia); 1861–1865 (CSA)
- Rank: First Lieutenant (Texas Army); Brigadier General (CSA)
- Conflicts: Texas Revolution; Mexican–American War; American Civil War

Henry Eustace McCulloch (December 6, 1816 – March 12, 1895) was a soldier in the Texas Revolution, a Texas Ranger, and a brigadier general in the army of the Confederate States during the American Civil War.

== Early life ==
Coat of Arrms of Henry Eustace McCulloch

McCulloch was born in Rutherford County, Tennessee, one of twelve children of Scots-Irish American Alexander McCulloch and French-American Frances Fisher LeNoir. Henry's father Alexander, a Yale University graduate, was a descendant of Captain Nicolas Martiau, the French Huguenot settler of Jamestown, Virginia and ancestor of President George Washington. Alexander was also an officer on Brig. Gen. John Coffee's staff during the Creek War of 1813 and 1814 in Alabama; his mother was a daughter of a prominent Virginia planter. The family had been wealthy, politically influential, and socially prominent in North Carolina before the American Revolution, but Alexander McCulloch had wasted much of his inheritance and was unable even to educate his sons. (Two of Henry McCulloch's older brothers briefly attended a school in Tennessee taught by their neighbor, Sam Houston.) After several moves, the family settled at Dyersburg, where one of their closest neighbors was Davy Crockett—a great influence on both McCulloch and his older brother, Ben McCulloch, who also would become a Confederate brigadier general.

== Texas career ==
Henry McCulloch shared in his brother Ben's economic attempts in the 1830s, including transporting goods by raft on the Mississippi, once all the way to New Orleans. When Davy Crockett went to Texas in 1835, Henry McCulloch and his brother made plans to meet Crockett's Tennessee Boys at Nacogdoches on Christmas Day. However, Ben contracted measles and was bedridden for several weeks and while ill convinced his brother Henry to return to Tennessee in November 1835. Luckily, the illness kept them from arriving with Crockett at the Alamo.

In 1838, both Henry and Ben McCulloch were making a living as surveyors. They also made a reputations as Indian fighters. Both took part in the Battle Creek Fight against the Comanche Indians in Navarro County, also known as "The Surveyors' Fight". In 1839, Henry McCulloch was on the muster roll of Capt. Mathew Caldwell's "Gonzales Rangers". Also in 1839, Ben was elected to the Republic of Texas House of Representatives after a contentious campaign that included assorted slanders between the candidates. As a result, Ben fought a rifle duel with his opponent, Reuben Ross and received a permanently crippling wound in the arm. The matter was considered closed but it flared up again the following year, this time involving Henry, who killed Ross with a pistol.

On August 20, 1840, McCulloch married Jane Isabella Ashby, daughter of John Miller Ashby and Mary Harris Garnett of Kentucky, who had been early settlers in the DeWitt Colony, which was centered on Gonzales. They had twelve children, most of whom remained in Texas.

Later in 1840, McCulloch took part in the Battle of Plum Creek, acting as a scout against the Comanches and being wounded. When a Mexican raiding force under Gen. Adrian Woll invested San Antonio in September 1842, he served as First Lieutenant of a company of volunteers from Seguin. He again operated as a scout, including infiltrating enemy lines, and commanded a spy company at the Battle of Salado Creek. With his brother, Ben, he subsequently took part in the failed Somervell expedition and both men were ordered to leave shortly before most of the Texans were captured at Mier, Mexico in Tamaulipas, December 25, 1842.

He was elected sheriff of Gonzales in 1843 and also opened a mercantile business there. The following year, he moved his family permanently to Seguin.

There are several letters written in the 1890s (now in the possession of the Texas State Library) in which McCulloch describes his (and his brother's) activities during the Texas Revolution and under the Republic.

In December 1847, McCulloch was in command of a Ranger company in Burnet County and established what became Fort Croghan. When the War with Mexico began, he took command of a volunteer company patrolling the same area of the western frontier against Indian raids. He continued this service after the war as captain of a company of Texas Mounted Volunteers out of Fort Murrill, and also operating a Ranger post in Kimble County.

He served in both houses of the Texas Legislature from Guadalupe County, being elected to the House of Representatives in 1853 and the Senate in 1855. Among other subjects, he introduced bills to regulate the use by slaveowners of "manager slaves" and to acquire the Alamo as a state monument. He then received an appointment as U.S. marshal from President Buchanan for the eastern district of Texas, and was a delegate from Guadalupe County to the Texas secession convention in January 1861. {His brother Ben had been 1852 US Marshal for the eastern District of Texas}

== Civil War ==
A few days after the convention voted for secession from the union on February 1, 1861 (though before the necessary referendum), the Texas Committee of Public Safety established a Provisional Army, in which McCulloch received a commission as colonel. On March 4, he was appointed commander of the 1st Texas Cavalry Regiment, also known (especially to its officers) as the 1st Texas Mounted Rifles. The unit was recruited from several counties in central Texas to serve for twelve months and was the first Texas cavalry regiment to enter Confederate service. Its mission was to maintain a line of patrol from the Red River southwest to the junction of the Concho and North Concho Rivers, a point near present-day San Angelo.

McCulloch was acknowledged by his superiors and others for his emphasis on precise discipline and gentlemanly conduct in his regiment. His training methods included complex cavalry and infantry maneuvers as well as sabre-fighting and the proper care of horses and equipment. Many Texas units maintained only lax rules of propriety and organization, but the 1st Texas remained a cohesive and loyal unit, disbanding only under the proper orders.

After receiving word of the action at Fort Sumter, McCulloch moved five companies to confront any federal troops remaining in Texas who had not yet embarked at the port of Indianola, but en route he received orders from Maj. Gen. Earl Van Dorn to intercept a federal force northwest of San Antonio. On May 9, McCulloch's troops, numbering some 1,300, captured the 8th U.S. Infantry near San Lucas Springs.

Late in June, McCulloch crossed the Red River with Maj. Edward Burleson to ensure the friendliness (or at least the neutrality) of the Wichita and Caddo Indians, following this with a warning that any raids across the river into Texas would bring retaliation—and over the following year, there were in fact a number of engagements between elements of the 1st Texas and Indian raiding parties. The success of the Texas troops in suppressing these raids is shown in the fact that the number of raids actually decreased during 1861 and 1862 from the numbers reported in previous years.

In September 1861, McCulloch, now a brigadier general, assumed temporary command of the Department of Texas until the arrival of Brig. Gen. Paul O. Hébert, and in December was named to command the new Western Military District, comprising that part of the state west and south of San Antonio. Early the next year, he was ordered to assume co-command of Texas State Troops being sent to Arkansas.

On September 6, 1862, following the death near Little Rock of his co-commander, Allison Nelson of Waco, McCulloch took command of the new Texas Division and organized it into four brigades, ultimately taking command of the Third Brigade himself while the division as a whole was under the command of Maj. Gen. John G. Walker. The division was attached to the District of Arkansas, Trans-Mississippi Department, and by April 1863 it was in Louisiana, where it took part in the Red River Campaign, the Camden Expedition, and the Battle of Milliken's Bend, which was an early phase of the Vicksburg campaign. In July 1863, the division arrived in Alexandria, Louisiana, where McCulloch was replaced by Col. George M. Flournoy. McCulloch was approached as a candidate for governor of Texas late that summer, but declined in order to remain on active service.

In 1864 and 1865, McCulloch was again in north Texas and in charge of the Western Sub-District of Texas (the entire District now being under the command of Maj. Gen. John B. Magruder), where he was active not only in dealing with Indian raids but in pursuing and arresting Confederate deserters and bushwhackers. At the end of the war, on his return to his home in Seguin, he found it necessary to travel with an armed escort because of threats against his life by deserters.

== Postbellum career ==
In 1874, he was active early in the administration of Gov. Richard Coke, especially in helping to physically remove Edmund J. Davis from the executive offices. In 1876, as a reward for his services to Texas, he was appointed superintendent of the Deaf and Dumb Asylum (later the Texas School for the Deaf) in Austin. Though a respected military commander, he proved an inept civil administrator and a legislative investigation forced him to resign his position in 1879; he was succeeded in that office by Col. John S. "Rip" Ford, his old commander in the Rangers.

McCulloch became an early leader of the Populist movement in Texas. He was the early favorite to win the party's nomination for the 1892 gubernatorial election, but he withdrew at the convention amid concerns about his declining health.

The retired general apparently enjoyed his retirement, frequently receiving distinguished visitors in his home, giving interviews and engaging in correspondence with inquiring historical writers, and was in regular demand as a speaker at July Fourth festivities throughout central Texas. He was also a trustee in the local Methodist Church. Henry E. McCulloch died March 12, 1895, at Rockport, Texas, and was buried in San Geronimo Cemetery in Seguin. He received a full masonic funeral, having been an active freemason after the War in the Guadalupe County lodge. His widow, Jane Ashby McCulloch died in 1896.

Camp Henry McCulloch was located at "Nuner's Mott", about four miles north of the present city limits of Victoria in Victoria County. It was the training site in the fall of 1861 for several infantry and cavalry companies of the 6th Texas Infantry Regiment, CSA (at the time when McCulloch was interim commander of the Department of Texas). A Texas state historical marker was erected at the site.

The Gen. Henry E. McCulloch Camp #843 of the Sons of Confederate Veterans, Texas Division, Central Texas Brigade, is located in Brownwood, Texas.

== Popular culture ==
His wife, Jane Isabella Ashby McCulloch, was a sister of Sarah Ashby McClure and Euphemia Ashby King, two of the main characters Janice Woods Windle's historical novel True Women, which was made into a TV movie.

== See also ==
- List of American Civil War generals (Confederate)

== Bibliography ==
- Eicher, John H., and David J. Eicher, Civil War High Commands. Stanford: Stanford University Press, 2001. ISBN 978-0-8047-3641-1.
- Greer, James K. Colonel Jack Hayes: Texas Frontier Leader and California Builder. College Station: Texas A&M University Press, 1987. (ISBN 0-89096-294-4)
- Hughes, William J. Rebellious Ranger: Rip Ford and the Old Southwest. Norman: University of Oklahoma Press, 1964. (ISBN 0-585-14869-4, electronic book)
- McGowen, Stanley S. Horse Sweat and Powder Smoke: The First Texas Cavalry in the Civil War. College Station: Texas A&M University Press, 1999. (ISBN 0-89096-903-5)
- Sifakis, Stewart. Who Was Who in the Civil War. New York: Facts On File, 1988. ISBN 978-0-8160-1055-4.
- Smith, David Paul. Frontier Defense in the Civil War: Texas' Rangers and Rebels. College Station: Texas A&M University Press, 1992. (ISBN 0-89096-484-X)
- Warner, Ezra J. (1959). Generals in Gray: Lives of the Confederate Commanders (1st ed.). Baton Rouge: Louisiana State University Press. OCLC 445052.
- Webb, Walter Prescott. The Texas rangers: A Century of Frontier Defense. Boston: Houghton Mifflin 1935. (2nd edition, Austin: University of Texas Press, 1965)

Texas Senate
Preceded by Claiborne Kyle	Texas State Senator from District 27 (Seguin); 1855–1859	Succeeded by Thomas Hinds Duggan
