= John George Walker =

Confederate States Army general

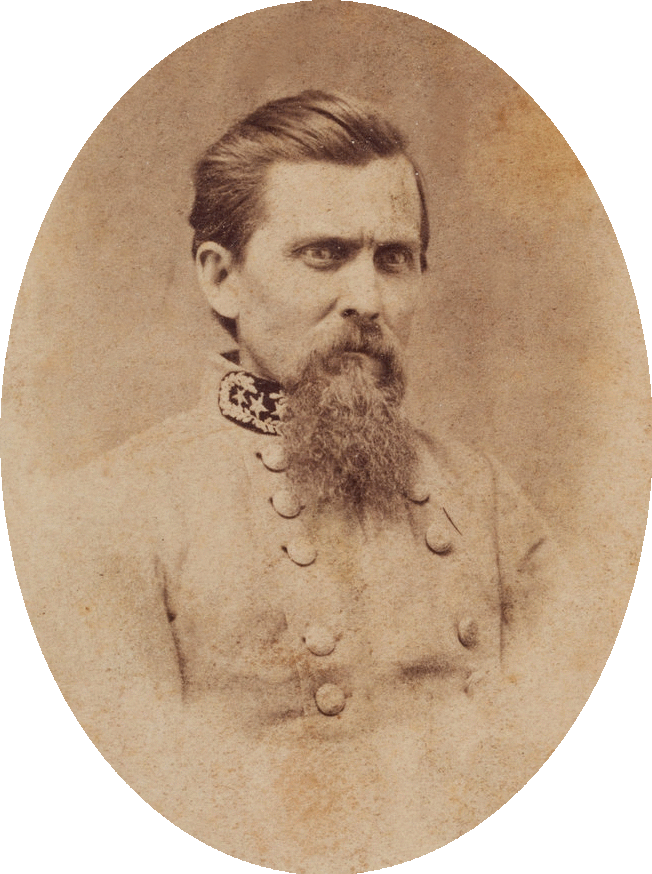
- Walker in uniform, c. 1862
- Born: July 22, 1821; Jefferson City, Missouri, U.S.
- Died: July 20, 1893 (aged 71); Washington, D.C., U.S.
- Burial place: Stonewall Cemetery, Winchester, Virginia, U.S.
- Military career
- Allegiance: United States; Confederate States
- Branch: United States Army; Confederate States Army
- Service years: 1846–1861 (USA); 1861–1865 (CSA)
- Rank: Captain (USA); Major-General (CSA)
- Commands: Walker's Texas Division
- Conflicts: Mexican–American War: Battle of San Juan de los Llanos; Battle of Molino del Rey; Apache Wars; Battle of the Diablo Mountains; American Civil War; Peninsula Campaign; Battle of Malvern Hill; Battle of Harpers Ferry; Battle of Antietam; Siege of Vicksburg; Battle of Milliken's Bend; Red River Campaign; Battle of Mansfield; Battle of Pleasant Hill; Battle of Jenkins' Ferry

Major-General John George Walker (July 22, 1821 – July 20, 1893) was a Confederate general in the American Civil War. He served as a brigadier general under Stonewall Jackson and James Longstreet, before commanding the Texas Division unit in the Trans-Mississippi Department, known as Walker's Greyhounds for their speed and agility. He was ordered to disrupt U.S. Grant's supply-line opposite Vicksburg, Mississippi, but Grant had managed to cross to the East Bank, and Walker was reduced to minor operations, one of them against some of the first African-American troops to serve in battle. He was able to make a bigger contribution to the Red River Campaign in support of General Richard Taylor.

== Early life and career ==
John George Walker was born in Jefferson City, Missouri. His mother Sarah Caffery Walker, was a niece of Rachel Jackson, the wife of Andrew Jackson. His father John Walker came from a distinguished political family from Kentucky and Missouri, with two brothers, George Walker and David Walker, serving in the United States Congress. John G. Walker grew up in the St. Louis area and graduated from the predecessor to Washington University in 1844.

Walker joined the United States Army as a first lieutenant of the Regiment of Mounted Rifles in 1846, and served with distinction in the Mexican–American War, where he was breveted to captain for San Juan de los Llanos and was wounded at Molino del Rey. He was promoted to the full rank of captain June 1851. In 1858, he married Sophie Baylor, whose family was responsible for the naming of Baylor University. Walker remained in the Army until July 1861, when he joined the Confederate States Army as a major in the cavalry.

== American Civil War ==
=== Service in the East ===
Walker was promoted of the 8th Texas Cavalry in August 1861, where he served in the Department of North Carolina. In September 1861, he was promoted to colonel. In January 1862, he was promoted to brigadier general and served in the Peninsula Campaign in the division of Brig. Gen. Theophilus H. Holmes, where he was wounded at Malvern Hill. His division occupied Loudoun Heights, overlooking Harpers Ferry, West Virginia before its garrison surrendered to Stonewall Jackson on September 15, 1862.

=== Trans-Mississippi ===
In November 1862, Walker was promoted to major general and transferred to the Trans-Mississippi Department, where he was given command of 12 Texas regiments, numbering 12,000 men, training at Camp Nelson in Arkansas. Walker formed the regiments into a Division, which earned the nickname "Walker's Greyhounds" for their ability to move quickly over many miles on foot. From November 1862 until the end of the war, the Greyhounds were formed exclusively of soldiers from Texas, and did not leave the Trans-Mississippi Department.

In March 1863, the new commander of the Trans-Mississippi Department, Lt. Gen. Edmund Kirby-Smith, assigned the Greyhounds to Maj. Gen. Richard Taylor's Western Louisiana command, and they were given the task of attacking Maj. Gen. Ulysses S. Grant's supply line that ran on the western bank of the Mississippi River on the Louisiana side opposite the besieged Vicksburg, Mississippi.

Grant, having recently moved his supply lines to the eastern banks of the Mississippi, was not harmed by the attack of Walker's Greyhounds. Hawes's Brigade was engaged in combat against the Federals at the Battle of Young's Point, and McCullough's Brigade fought African-American Union troops at the Battle of Milliken's Bend on June 6, 1863. This was one of the first times African-American troops engaged in combat. The troops fought bravely, but poorly trained, suffered heavy casualties at the hands of Walker's men. The battle became a Union victory when Federal gunboats supported the Union troops, driving McCullough's Brigade back.

Taylor, who commanded Walker in this campaign, had argued against the venture to his superior Smith. He argued that Walker's troops would be better used helping his Army of 4,000 attack New Orleans, whose defense had been severely weakened by the movement of Banks' Army of the Gulf upriver to Port Hudson.

After Milliken's Bend, Taylor again requested Walker's troops to aid in his attack on New Orleans, but Smith again denied the request. Walker spent the balance of the summer fruitlessly patrolling the northeastern area of Louisiana, unable to cross the Mississippi and support the besieged Vicksburg.

Walker headed back to Arkansas in late 1863, but in March 1864, joined Taylor once again in Alexandria to help Taylor defend against the advances of Nathaniel P. Banks and his Army of the Gulf in the Red River Campaign. Walker's troops played a critical role in the Confederate victory at the Battle of Mansfield on April 8, 1864. Rather than leave Walker's Greyhounds with Taylor as he sought to capture the retreating Banks, Smith sent Walker north to fight Union General Frederick Steele. Walker engaged Steele at the Battle of Jenkins' Ferry on April 30, 1864, about 30 miles south of Little Rock, Arkansas.

As Steele fled northward after the battle, clearly not intending to join Banks in his attempt to capture Shreveport, Louisiana, Walker reversed course and headed back south to join Taylor's pursuit of Banks. He arrived in Alexandria on May 23, 1864, the same day that Banks's retreating Army was being picked up by Federal troop transports at Simmesport.

=== Western Louisiana ===
When Taylor was given command of the Department of Alabama, Mississippi, and Eastern Louisiana in August 1864, Walker was given command of his former superior's District of Western Louisiana. By the end of the war, he had been transferred further west, and commanded the District of Texas, New Mexico, and Arizona.

== Later life ==
At the close of the American Civil War, Walker fled to Mexico, where he remained for several months. In August 1865, Walker travelled to London, England where his wife joined him. There he pursued business ventures. Returning to the United States, he later served as the United States Consul in Bogotá, Colombia, and as a Special Commissioner to the Pan-American Convention.

Walker died in Washington, D.C. He is buried in the Stonewall Cemetery, Winchester, Virginia.

== See also ==
- List of American Civil War generals (Confederate)

== Sources ==
- Eicher, John H., and David J. Eicher, Civil War High Commands. Stanford: Stanford University Press, 2001. ISBN 978-0-8047-3641-1.
- Lowe, Richard G.,Walker's Texas Division, C.S.A: Greyhounds of the Trans-Mississippi, Louisiana State University Press, 2004, ISBN 0-8071-2933-X.
- Sifakis, Stewart. Who Was Who in the Civil War. New York: Facts On File, 1988. ISBN 978-0-8160-1055-4.
- Warner, Ezra J. (1959). Generals in Gray: Lives of the Confederate Commanders (1st ed.). Baton Rouge: Louisiana State University Press. OCLC 445052.
