= Trans-Mississippi Department =

Territorial department of the Confederate States Army

- Active: 1862–1865
- Disbanded: May 26, 1865
- Country: Confederate States
- Branch: Army
- Type: Territorial department
- Headquarters: Little Rock, Arkansas (1862–63); Shreveport, Louisiana (1863–65); Houston, Texas (May 1865)
- Wars: American Civil War; Trans-Mississippi Theater

The Trans-Mississippi Department was a territorial department of the Confederate States Army that included Arkansas, Louisiana west of the Mississippi River, Texas (including what is now New Mexico and Arizona), and the Indian Territory. It was the last department to surrender to United States forces at the end of the American Civil War.

== History ==
The Trans-Mississippi Department was established pursuant to War Department General Orders No. 39, dated May 26, 1862, with headquarters at Little Rock, Arkansas. On April 24, 1863, the department moved to Shreveport, Louisiana, where it remained before finally relocating to Houston, Texas, on May 18, 1865.

Following the Union capture of the remaining strongholds at Vicksburg and Port Hudson resulting in the closing of the Mississippi to the Confederacy, General E. Kirby Smith was virtually cut off from the Confederate capital at Richmond. He had to command a nearly independent area of the Confederacy, with all the inherent administrative problems. The area became known in the Confederacy as "Kirby Smithdom". He was thought of as a virtual military dictator and negotiated directly with foreign countries.

== Field armies ==
Army of the Trans-Mississippi

- Commanded by General Edmund Kirby Smith. Originally formed as the Army of the Southwest it was the primary field army of the department operating in campaigns in Arkansas, Missouri, and Louisiana.

Army of Western Louisiana

- Commanded by Major General Richard Taylor. The field force of the subdistrict of the District of Western Louisiana. It was the main force during the Red River Campaign of 1864.

Army of Missouri

- Commanded Major General Sterling Price. Formed in September 1864, it was composed mostly of cavalry divisions tasked with invading Missouri ("Price’s Raid") to divert Union troops from the eastern theater.

Army of New Mexico

- Commanded by Brigadier General Henry Hopkins Sibley. A small, specialized field force that operated at the very beginning of the theater's organization from late 1861 to early 1862. It launched the New Mexico Campaign to capture Union forts and secure a pathway to the goldfields of Colorado and California. After tactical victories but a disastrous supply loss at the Battle of Glorieta Pass, it retreated back to Texas and Louisiana.

Army of the West

- Commanded by Major General Earl Van Dorn. Formed in early 1862 and participated in operations in Arkansas. Van Dorn led the army across the Mississippi River to reinforce positions in Tennessee, thus leaving the Trans Mississippi Department in September 1862.

== Commanding officers ==
Confederate Trans-Mississippi Department (from 1863)

- Brigadier-General Paul O. Hébert (May 26, 1862 – June 20, 1862)
- Major-General John B. Magruder (assigned June 20, 1862, but did not accept)
- Major-General Thomas C. Hindman (June 20, 1862 – July 16, 1862)
- Lieutenant-General Theophilus H. Holmes (July 30, 1862 – February 9, 1863)
- General E. Kirby Smith (March 7, 1863 – April 19, 1865)
- Lieutenant-General Simon Bolivar Buckner (April 19, 1865 – April 22, 1865)
- General E. Kirby Smith (April 22, 1865 – May 26, 1865)
