= 2nd Louisiana Cavalry Regiment =

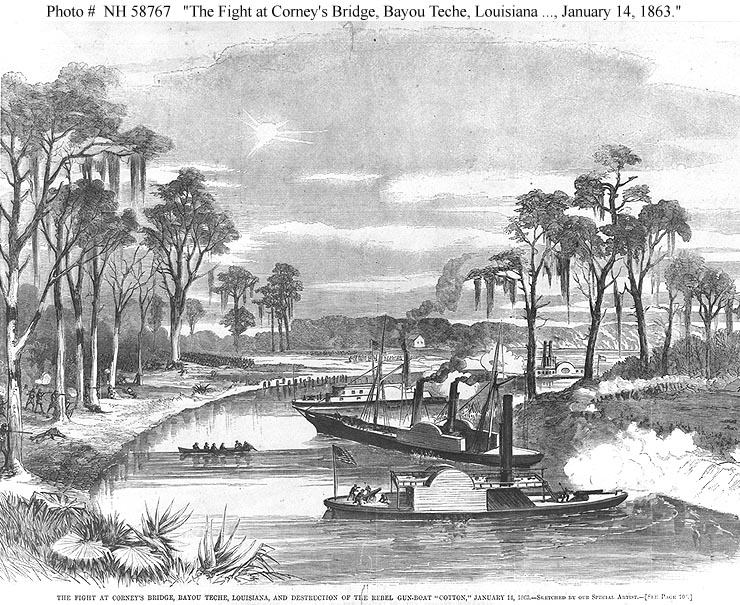
- On 14 January 1863, the regiment tried and failed to save the Confederate gunboat Cotton.
- Active: 1 September 1862 – 26 May 1865
- Country: Confederate States of America
- Allegiance: Confederate States of America; Louisiana
- Branch: Confederate States Army
- Type: Cavalry
- Size: Regiment
- Engagements: American Civil War: Battle of Georgia Landing; Capture of the Cotton; Battle of Fort Bisland; Battle of Irish Bend; Capture of Brashear City; Battle of Henderson's Hill; Battle of Mansfield

Commanders
- Notable commanders: William G. Vincent

The 2nd Louisiana Cavalry Regiment was a unit of mounted volunteers recruited in Louisiana that fought in the Confederate States Army during the American Civil War. Breazeale's Cavalry Battalion was formed in July 1862 and was augmented by five additional companies in September 1862 to form a regiment. It served for the entire war west of the Mississippi River in the Trans-Mississippi Department. The regiment fought at Georgia Landing, Fort Bisland, Irish Bend, and Brashear City in 1863 and Henderson's Hill and Mansfield in 1864. Afterward, the regiment fought in minor skirmishes before the Trans-Mississippi's final surrender on 26 May 1865.

== Formation ==
=== Breazeale's Cavalry Battalion ===
Breazeale's Cavalry Battalion organized at Natchitoches, Louisiana, on 27 July 1862. Major Winter W. Breazeale led the battalion which consisted of six companies labeled A through F. Louisiana Governor Thomas Overton Moore directed the battalion to relocate to Moreauville, but apparently this was not done. On 21 August, the battalion officially transferred to the Confederate Army while still at Natchitoches. Lieutenant General Richard Taylor ordered the battalion to march to Opelousas where five of its companies were merged with five independent cavalry companies to create the 2nd Louisiana Cavalry Regiment. Company D from Bienville Parish, originally titled the Du Lac Espagnol and led by Captain J. F. Scarborough, did not travel to Opelousas and was not incorporated into the new regiment. The battalion's companies became Companies B, C, D, E, and F in the new regiment.

=== 2nd Louisiana Cavalry ===
According to historian Arthur W. Bergeron Jr., the new regiment was formed about 1 September at Donaldsonville. Stephen B. Oates gave the formation date as 15 September and listed its strength as 908 soldiers in 10 companies. The field officers were Colonel William G. Vincent, Lieutenant Colonel James A. McWaters, and Major Winter W. Breazeale. McWaters was killed 14 January 1863 and replaced as lieutenant colonel by W. W. Breazeale who resigned 13 January 1864. Other lieutenant colonels were James D. Blair who resigned on 10 April 1865 and W. Overton Breazeale. After W. W. Breazeale was promoted, the rank of major was held by Blair, W. O. Breazeale, and S. C. Furman.

Captain B. S. Tappan was murdered 10 September 1862. Captain W. O. Breazeale was promoted major 13 January 1864. Captain W. F. Kephart was cashiered in 1864. Captain A. O. P. Pickens deserted 30 March 1865. Captain Furman was promoted major 10 April 1865. Captain Thomas J. Stafford resigned 28 April 1865. Captain Allen Jumel transferred to Quartermaster in 1865. The company commanders, nicknames, and recruitment areas are listed in the table below.

Company information for the 2nd Louisiana Cavalry Regiment
Company	Nickname	Captains	Recruitment Parish
A	Independent Rangers	James M. Thompson (r); Louis D. Prescott	St. Landry
B	Marion Rangers	James D. Blair (p); W. H. Kephart (c)	Natchitoches
C	Natchitoches Rangers	W. Overton Breazeale (p); H. Polycarp Gallien	Natchitoches
D	Ile Breville Rangers	F. A. Prudhomme	Natchitoches
E	Furman Rangers	S. C. Furman (p); J. F. Scarborough	Bienville
F	Alligator Rangers	A. O. P. Pickens (d)	Bienville
G	McWaters Rangers	Thomas J. Stafford (r); E. T. Lewis	Rapides
H	no name	B. S. Tappan (m); J. B. Whittington	Assumption
I	no name	Allen Jumel (t); Alexander Hebert	Iberville
K	no name	Severin Porche (u); Amedee C. Broussard	Pointe Coupee

- Key: c = cashiered, d = deserted, m = murdered, p = promoted, r = resigned, t = transferred, u = unknown.

== Service ==
=== 1862–1863 ===
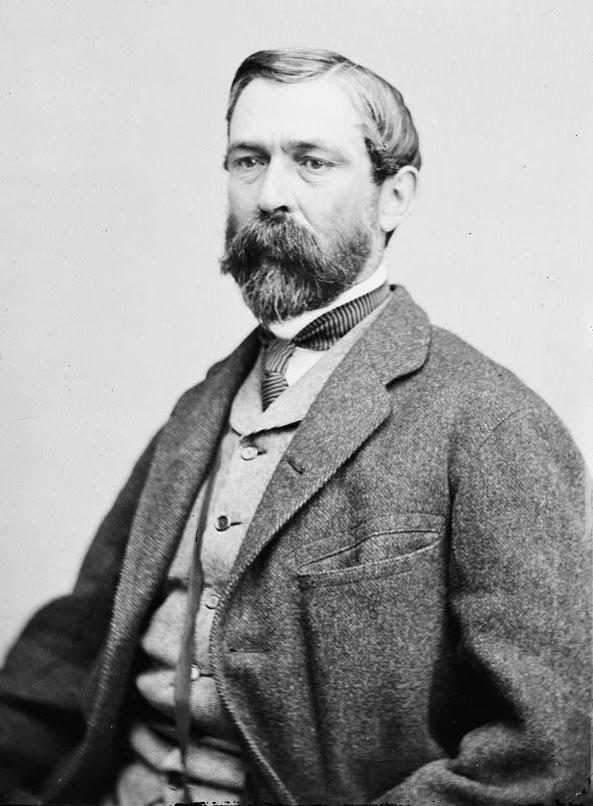
Richard Taylor

On 25 September 1862, elements of the 2nd Louisiana Cavalry encountered a small Federal force on Bayou Lafourche below Donaldsonville and compelled it to retreat to its gunboats. On 27 October, the regiment fought in the Battle of Georgia Landing (Labadieville) and withdrew with other Confederate forces to Patterson on Bayou Teche. At the end of 1862, the soldiers skirmished with Union troops. On 13 January 1863, the regiment tried without success to defend the gunboat Cotton on Bayou Teche.

In an attempt to clear Confederate forces from the west bank of the Mississippi River, Major General Nathaniel P. Banks moved north along Bayou Teche and the Atchafalaya River with 15,000 Federal troops. To oppose Banks, Taylor had about 5,000 Confederates. Banks planned to have part of his army pin the Confederates at Fort Bisland while sending Brigadier General Cuvier Grover's division up the Atchafalaya in river transports to land at Grand Lake and cut off Taylor's retreat. On 12–13 April 1863 in the Battle of Fort Bisland, the Federals pressed close to the fort but found it abandoned the next day. In the Battle of Irish Bend on 14 April, Taylor's soldiers blocked Grover's enveloping column and escaped Banks' intended trap. Union casualties numbered 350 while Confederate losses were not reported. On 12–13 April, the 2nd Louisiana Cavalry picketed the shore of Grand Lake and acted as a reserve. The next day, the unit played a major part in the fighting at Irish Bend. During Taylor's withdrawal to Alexandria, the regiment formed part of the rearguard.

In June 1863, the regiment was in the Confederate vanguard when they reoccupied much of south Louisiana. On 23 June, part of the regiment assisted in the Capture of Brashear City. The summer and fall were spent picketing along Bayou Teche and campaigning against Jayhawkers (pro-Union Louisianans) and Confederate deserters in the southwest part of the state. In October–November 1863, the regiment was engaged in skirmishing during the Union army's failed campaign along Bayou Teche. In the following winter, the unit was stationed at St. Martinville observing the Federal garrison at Brashear City.

=== 1864–1865 ===
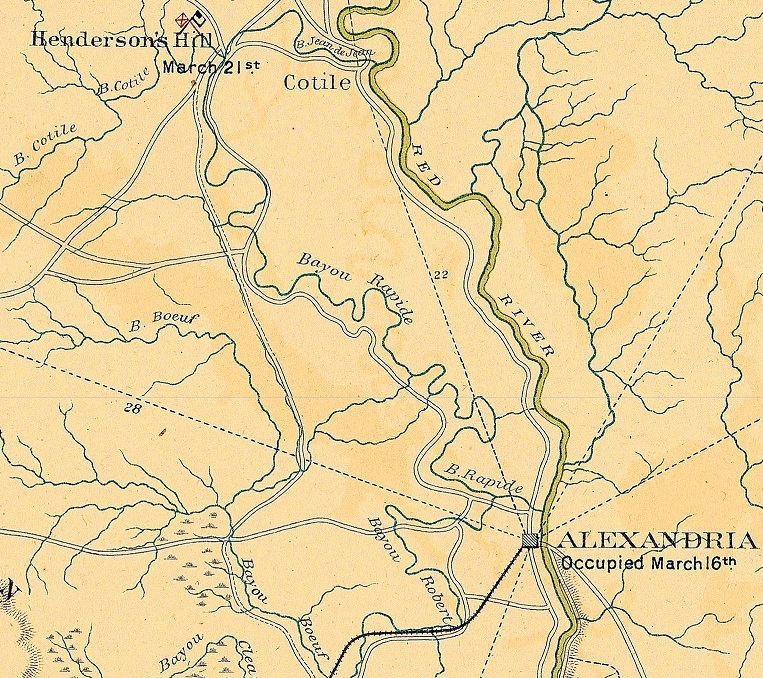
Map shows Henderson's Hill, Bayou Rapides, and Alexandria. The town of Cotile is now named Boyce.

In the Red River campaign, Banks and a Union army planned to ascend the Red River and capture Shreveport. While Banks marched north along Bayou Teche with 17,000 Union soldiers, Brigadier General Andrew Jackson Smith and 10,000 men would enter the Red River in river transports. The two forces proposed to join at Alexandria before heading upriver, supported by a gunboat fleet under Rear Admiral David Dixon Porter. The 2nd Louisiana Cavalry was initially deployed near Vermilionville on Bayou Teche, except for three companies with Major General John George Walker's infantry division at Marksville. On 13 March 1864, Smith's troops landed at Simmesport and the following day they captured Fort DeRussy. On 15 March, Porter's fleet reached Alexandria which was occupied the following day by Federal troops. Taylor's forces withdrew to the north.

On 18 March, Taylor massed the divisions of Walker and Brigadier General Alfred Mouton at Carroll Jones' plantation, approximately midway between Alexandria and Natchitoches. Delayed by bad weather, Banks' column was late. A Union cavalry division led by Brigadier General Albert Lindley Lee reached Alexandria on 19 March, but the infantry and artillery did not arrive until 25–26 March. Taylor reinforced Vincent's regiment with Captain William Edgar's 1st Texas Field Battery and sent it toward Alexandria, where it skirmished with the Federals for two days. Smith ordered Brigadier General Joseph A. Mower to take his infantry division and Colonel Thomas J. Lucas' cavalry brigade and probe to the north. Mower's force included the infantry brigades of Colonels Sylvester G. Hill and Lucius Frederick Hubbard, plus the 9th Indiana Battery.

On March 21, Mower's task force moved north along Bayou Rapides. Lucas' cavalry pushed the Confederates back to Henderson's Hill where Vincent formed a defensive line supported by Edgar's battery. Vincent asked Taylor to send reinforcements. While Lucas occupied the Confederates' attention from the front, Mower sent Hill's brigade on a march around Vincent's right flank. Hill's brigade included the 33rd Missouri and 35th Iowa Infantry Regiments. After marching through a rain and hailstorm, Hill's troops got behind the Confederate camp. The Federals advanced with fixed bayonets and completely surprised the Confederates, capturing 222 men, 4 cannons, 4 caissons, 32 artillery horses, 126 cavalry horses, 92 stands of small arms, and 1 ambulance. Vincent and some others escaped.

There were several explanations for the debacle. At first, the Confederates believed their assailants were Taylor's expected reinforcements. Taylor blamed "the treachery of citizens" who revealed to Mower, "a road unknown to my best guides". A soldier in Walker's division believed that Vincent's pickets were posted too far apart, allowing a Jayhawker to pose as a picket and get the countersign from a courier arriving from Taylor. The Jayhawker then went to the Federal camp and divulged the countersign, allowing them to capture Vincent's pickets without raising an alarm.

The remaining members of the regiment fought dismounted at the Battle of Mansfield on 8 April 1864. Taylor sent the 2nd and 7th Louisiana Cavalry Regiments to south Louisiana to eliminate small Union garrisons and Jayhawkers. Soon after, the regiment returned to take part in the final skirmishes of the Red River campaign. Until the end of the conflict, the 2nd Louisiana Cavalry performed picket and outpost duty in the Bayou Teche region, as well as raids into the Bayou Lafourche area. When the war ended, different parts of the regiment were in Natchitoches, Opelousas and Washington. The Confederate Trans-Mississippi Department surrendered on 26 May 1865.

== See also ==
- List of Louisiana Confederate Civil War units
- Louisiana in the Civil War
