= Mount Adnah Cemetery =

Historic cemetery in New York, United States

- U.S. National Register of Historic Places
- Location within New York Location within the United States
- Location: 706 East Broadway, Fulton, New York
- Coordinates: 43°19′14″N 76°24′12″W
- Area: 44.9 acres (18.2 ha)
- Built: 1853
- Architect: Peter Schenck, John Hopkins Shepard
- NRHP reference No.: 01000046
- Added to NRHP: February 2, 2001

Mount Adnah Cemetery is a historic rural cemetery located at Fulton in Oswego County, New York. It was designed in 1853 and within the boundaries of this contributing site are two contributing buildings (superintendent's house and barn), 10 contributing structures, and five contributing objects. Notable burials include M. Lindley Lee (1805–1876) and Albert Lindley Lee (1834–1907).

It was listed on the National Register of Historic Places in 2001.
