= Battle of Richmond, Louisiana =

Battle of the American Civil War

Battle of Richmond
- Part of the Vicksburg campaign
Date	June 15, 1863
Location	near Richmond, Louisiana 32.386°N 91.208°W
Result	Union victory

Belligerents
United States (Union)	(Confederate States of America) CSA (Confederacy)

Commanders and leaders
Joseph A. Mower; Alfred W. Ellet	John G. Walker

Units involved
Mower's brigade Mississippi Marine Brigade	Walker's Greyhounds

Strength
2,500	1,500 or 3,000

Casualties and losses
1 killed 11 wounded	5 killed 25 captured

The Battle of Richmond was fought on June 15, 1863, near Richmond, Louisiana, during the Vicksburg campaign of the American Civil War. Major General John George Walker's division of Confederate troops, known as Walker's Greyhounds had attacked Union forces in the Battle of Milliken's Bend and the Battle of Lake Providence earlier that month in hopes of relieving some of the pressure on the Confederate troops besieged in Vicksburg, Mississippi. While both of Walker's strikes were failures and the Confederates withdrew to Richmond, Union Major General Ulysses S. Grant still viewed the presence of Walker's men at Richmond to be a threat. On June 14, the Mississippi Marine Brigade and the infantry brigade of Brigadier General Joseph A. Mower were sent to attack the Confederates at Richmond.

The next morning, the two Union brigades joined forces. Confederate scouts greatly overestimated the Union strength, informing Walker that the Union had 7,000 or 8,000 men. Having at most 3,000 men, Walker deployed the 18th Texas Infantry Regiment and Edgar's Texas Battery in a forward position, with the rest of his force behind Roundaway Bayou and its single bridge. The Union advance was led by the Mississippi Marine Brigade and the 5th Minnesota Infantry Regiment. An attack by the 18th Texas Infantry drove in the Union skirmishers, but the Confederates were eventually forced to withdraw behind Roundaway Bayou. An hour-long artillery duel followed. After Walker learned that his supply wagons and ambulances were safely out of the area, he ordered his men to burn the bridge and withdraw. Union troops burned the town of Richmond, but did not pursue Walker's men, who withdrew to Delhi. Walker's men continued to operate in the area until July. Vicksburg surrendered on July 4.

== Background ==
During the American Civil War, control of the Mississippi River was a major strategic concern. One of the keys to controlling the river was the city of Vicksburg, Mississippi. The town of Richmond, Louisiana, lay along the Confederate supply line bringing food from the west to Vicksburg. This supply line was cut by Union troops commanded by Major General Ulysses S. Grant during the Vicksburg campaign. On May 18, Grant's forced reached Vicksburg and began the Siege of Vicksburg. Confederate president Jefferson Davis urged Lieutenant General E. Kirby Smith, the commander of the Trans-Mississippi Department (which was in charge of the territory west of the Mississippi River), to use some of his troops to attack Union positions in Louisiana and reduce the pressure on Vicksburg.

The Trans-Mississippi effort to reduce pressure on Vicksburg was led by Major General Richard Taylor and primarily utilized the division of Major General John George Walker, which was commonly known as Walker's Greyhounds. Walker's men were repulsed on June 7 in the Battle of Milliken's Bend, and two other Confederate thrusts, an abortive expedition to Young's Point, and the Battle of Lake Providence, accomplished little. Walker's men camped at Richmond after the attacks. One of Walker's three brigades was still returning from a movement down the Ouachita River, and the other two were greatly reduced in strength by disease. According to historian Richard Lowe, Walker had only about 1,500 Confederates in the area, but historian Ed Bearss rejects this figure, instead suggesting that Walker had about 3,000 men. Grant viewed the presence of the Confederates at Richmond to be a threat, and on June 14 sent 1,200 men from Brigadier General Joseph A. Mower's infantry brigade and 1,300 men of the Mississippi Marine Brigade on a strike against the Confederate position.

== Battle ==
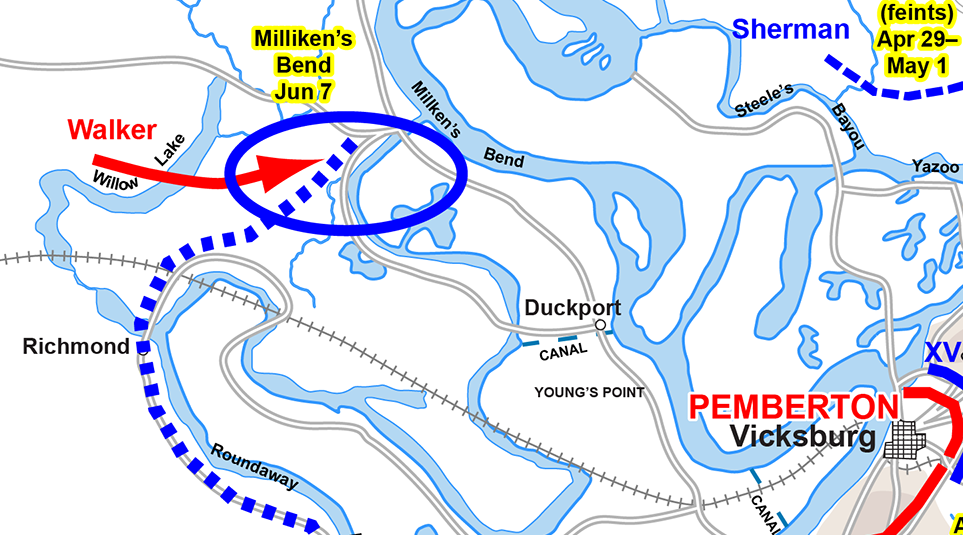
Map showing the relative locations of Milliken's Bend, Richmond, and Vicksburg

Mower's brigade was coming from Duckport, Louisiana, while the Mississippi Marine Brigade, under the command of Brigadier General Alfred W. Ellet, was moving from Milliken's Bend. The two forces met at a road junction on the morning of June 15, where they were observed by Confederate pickets. The Confederate scouts over-estimated the Union strength, and informed Walker that he was facing 7,000 or 8,000 Union soldiers. Walker responded by deploying the 18th Texas Infantry Regiment and Edgar's Texas Battery 1 mile (1.6 km) closer to the Union advance, sending the divisional supply wagons and ambulances towards Monroe, Louisiana, and positioned the rest of his force behind Roundaway Bayou, where it covered the sole bridge across the bayou to the town of Richmond. The 18th Texas Infantry was positioned in a ditch with its right flank on Walnut Bayou. The position was strong, but was susceptible to being outflanked on the left.

Ellet's brigade, accompanied by the 5th Minnesota Infantry Regiment, led the Union advance. The Union troops encountered Confederate fire, and a request was sent to Mower to bring up artillery. The 18th Texas Infantry charged, and drove in the Union skirmishers, but met the main Union line and was forced to withdraw. Aware that the Union forces outnumbered his forced and worried that he would be outflanked, the commander of the 18th Texas Infantry ordered his men to withdraw across the bayou. The Union batteries were brought up, and Edgar's battery and the Union artillery engaged in an artillery duel for an hour, delaying the Union advance. Mower grew impatient and sent most of his brigade to the right, but found that the bayou could not be crossed. Walker learned that his wagons were safely out of the area, so he ordered his men to retreat from the bayou and burn the bridge. The Union infantry was halted at the burned bridge, but a cavalry force waded the bayou and while pursuing captured roughly 25 Confederate stragglers. The Union forces rebuilt the bridge and entered Richmond, burning the town to the ground.

== Aftermath ==
Mower's brigade suffered casualties of one killed and eight wounded, while Ellet's brigade had another three men wounded. Walker lost five men killed and 25 captured. Mower and Ellet did not pursue the Confederates to Monroe, and instead withdrew from the area: Ellet back to Milliken's Bend, and Mower to Young's Point via Milliken's Bend. Ellet's men were back at Milliken's Bend by that night, while Mower's men returned to their camps on June 16. Walker's men withdrew to Delhi, Louisiana, and were joined by the brigade of Brigadier General James Camp Tappan along the way. After recuperating at Delhi for several days, Walker's men undertook a campaign against a series of cotton plantations leased by Union businessmen. The Confederate forces disrupted a number of these plantations, and captured hundreds of African American plantation workers, who were returned to slavery. Other Confederate troops captured a small Union camp in the Battle of Goodrich's Landing on June 29, but were driven off the next day. Vicksburg surrendered on July 4. On July 11, Walker began shifting his men to Monroe; they were soon ordered into south Louisiana.

== Sources ==
- Bearss, Edwin C. (1991) [1986]. The Campaign for Vicksburg. Vol. III: Unvexed to the Sea. Dayton, Ohio: Morningside Bookshop. ISBN 0-89029-516-6.
- Hearn, Chester G. (2000). Ellet's Brigade: The Strangest Outfit of All. Baton Rouge, Louisiana: Louisiana State University Press. ISBN 0-8071-2559-8.
- Kennedy, Frances H., ed. (1998). The Civil War Battlefield Guide (2nd ed.). Boston/New York: Houghton Mifflin. ISBN 978-0-395-74012-5.
- Lowe, Richard (2004). Walker's Texas Division C.S.A.: Greyhounds of the Trans-Mississippi. Baton Rouge, Louisiana: Louisiana State University Press. ISBN 0-8071-3153-9.
- Miller, Donald L. (2019). Vicksburg: Grant's Campaign that Broke the Confederacy. New York, New York: Simon and Schuster. ISBN 978-1-4516-4139-4.
- Shea, William L.; Winschel, Terrence J. (2003). Vicksburg Is the Key: The Struggle for the Mississippi River. Lincoln, Nebraska: University of Nebraska Press. ISBN 978-0-8032-9344-1.
- Winters, John D. (1991) [1963]. The Civil War in Louisiana. Baton Rouge, Louisiana: Louisiana State University Press. ISBN 0-8071-1725-0.
