= 35th Iowa Infantry Regiment =

- Iowa state flag
- Active: September 18, 1862, to August 10, 1865
- Country: United States
- Allegiance: Union
- Branch: Infantry
- Engagements: American Civil War: Siege of Vicksburg; Red River Campaign; Battle of Pleasant Hill; Battle of Nashville

The 35th Iowa Infantry Regiment was an infantry regiment that served in the Union Army during the American Civil War.

== Service ==
The 35th Iowa Infantry was organized at Muscatine, Iowa and mustered in for three years of Federal service on September 18, 1862.

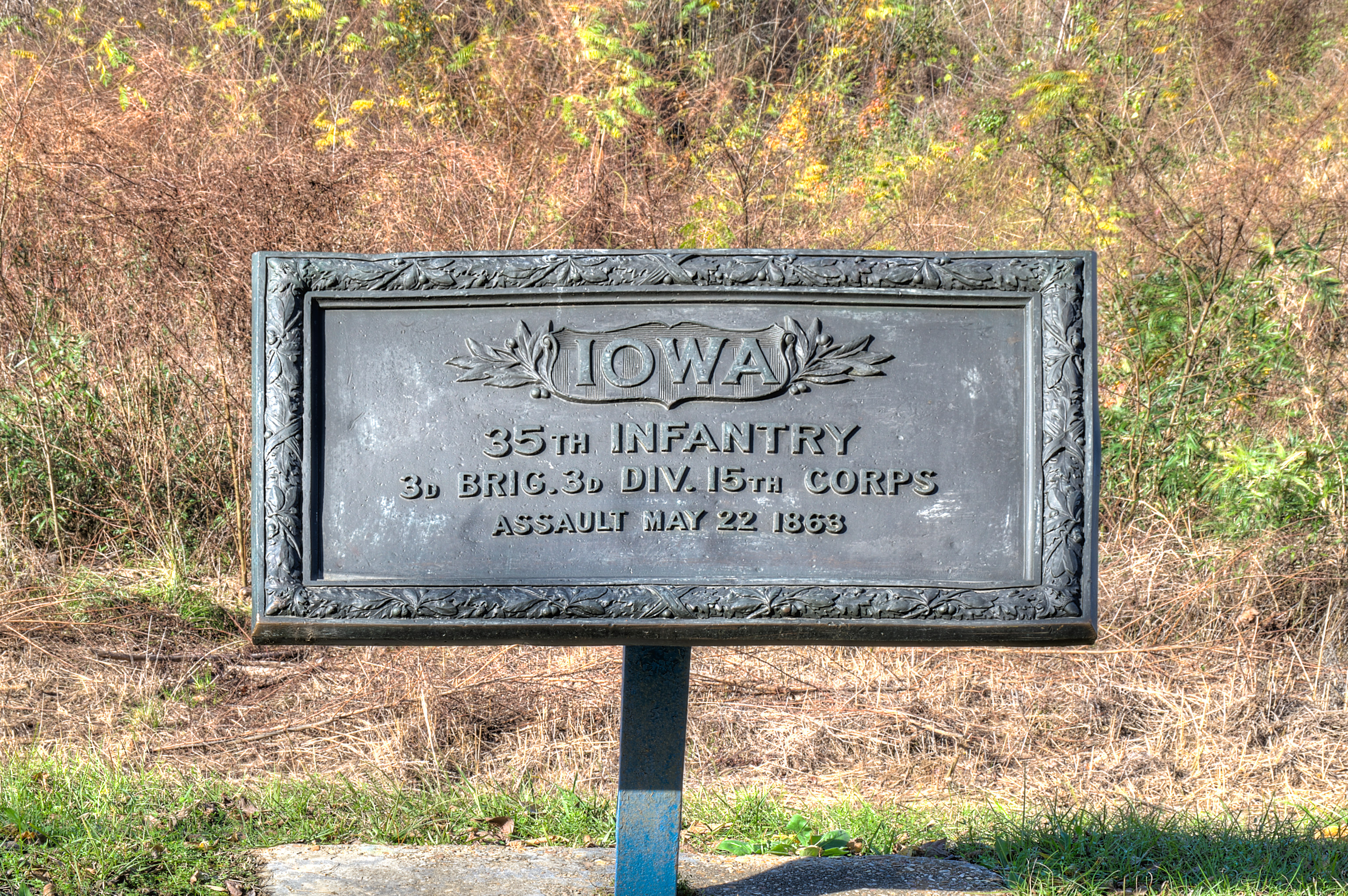
Position Marker at Vicksburg National Military Park

The regiment was mustered out on August 10, 1865.

== Total strength and casualties ==
A total of 1068 men served in the 35th Iowa at one time or another during its existence. It suffered 5 officers and 44 enlisted men who were killed in action or who died of their wounds and 3 officers and 185 enlisted men who died of disease, for a total of 237 fatalities.

== Commanders ==
- Colonel Sylvester G. Hill

== See also ==
- List of Iowa Civil War Units
- Iowa in the American Civil War
