= Sylvester G. Hill =

American colonel (1820–1864)

Sylvester Gardner Hill
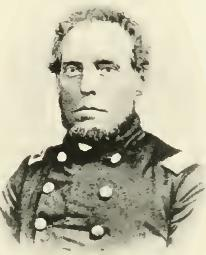
- Col. Sylvester G. Hill
- Born: June 10, 1820; North Kingstown, Rhode Island, U.S.
- Died: December 15, 1864 (aged 44); Nashville, Tennessee, U.S.
- Burial place: Greenwood Cemetery, Muscatine, Iowa
- Military career
- Allegiance: United States of America; Union
- Branch: United States Army; Union Army
- Service years: 1862–1864
- Rank: Colonel; Brevet Brigadier General
- Commands: 3rd Brigade, 1st Division, XVI Corps; 35th Iowa Infantry
- Conflicts: American Civil War: Siege of Vicksburg; Battle of Pleasant Hill; Battle of Tupelo; Battle of Yellow Bayou; Battle of Nashville †

Sylvester Gardner Hill (1820-1864) was a colonel in the Union Army during the American Civil War. He served as a brigade commander during the Red River Campaign and Battle of Nashville, where he was killed in action. He received a posthumous appointment as a brevet brigadier general.

== Early life ==
Sylvester Hill was born in North Kingstown, Rhode Island, but moved to Ohio in 1840. He settled in Cincinnati and was employed in the lumber business until 1849. Hill participated in the California Gold Rush but failed to achieve any profit from it. He traveled back eastward and settled in Muscatine, Iowa.

== Civil War ==
Hill was in Iowa when the Civil War began. Hill helped raise the 35th Iowa Volunteer Infantry Regiment, of which he was appointed Colonel on September 18, 1862. For the first several months of its existence the 35th Iowa was on garrison duty in Illinois and Kentucky until being ordered to join the Army of the Tennessee in the siege of Vicksburg. After the siege of Vicksburg, Colonel Hill assumed command of the 3rd Brigade, 1st Division, XVI Corps (Right Wing), a position he would maintain for much of the remainder of the war. Hill was wounded at the battles of Pleasant Hill and Yellow Bayou in 1864. He returned to regimental command at the Battle of Tupelo but was back in command of the 3rd Brigade during Price's Missouri Raid.

=== Battle of Nashville ===
Hill's final engagement came in December 1864 at the Battle of Nashville. On the first day of the battle Hill led his brigade against the Confederates on Montgomery Hill and was killed instantly from artillery fire from Redoubt No. 2. He was posthumously given a brevet promotion to brigadier general for his service at Nashville.
