= Battle of Fort DeRussy =

1864 battle of the American Civil War

- Part of the American Civil War
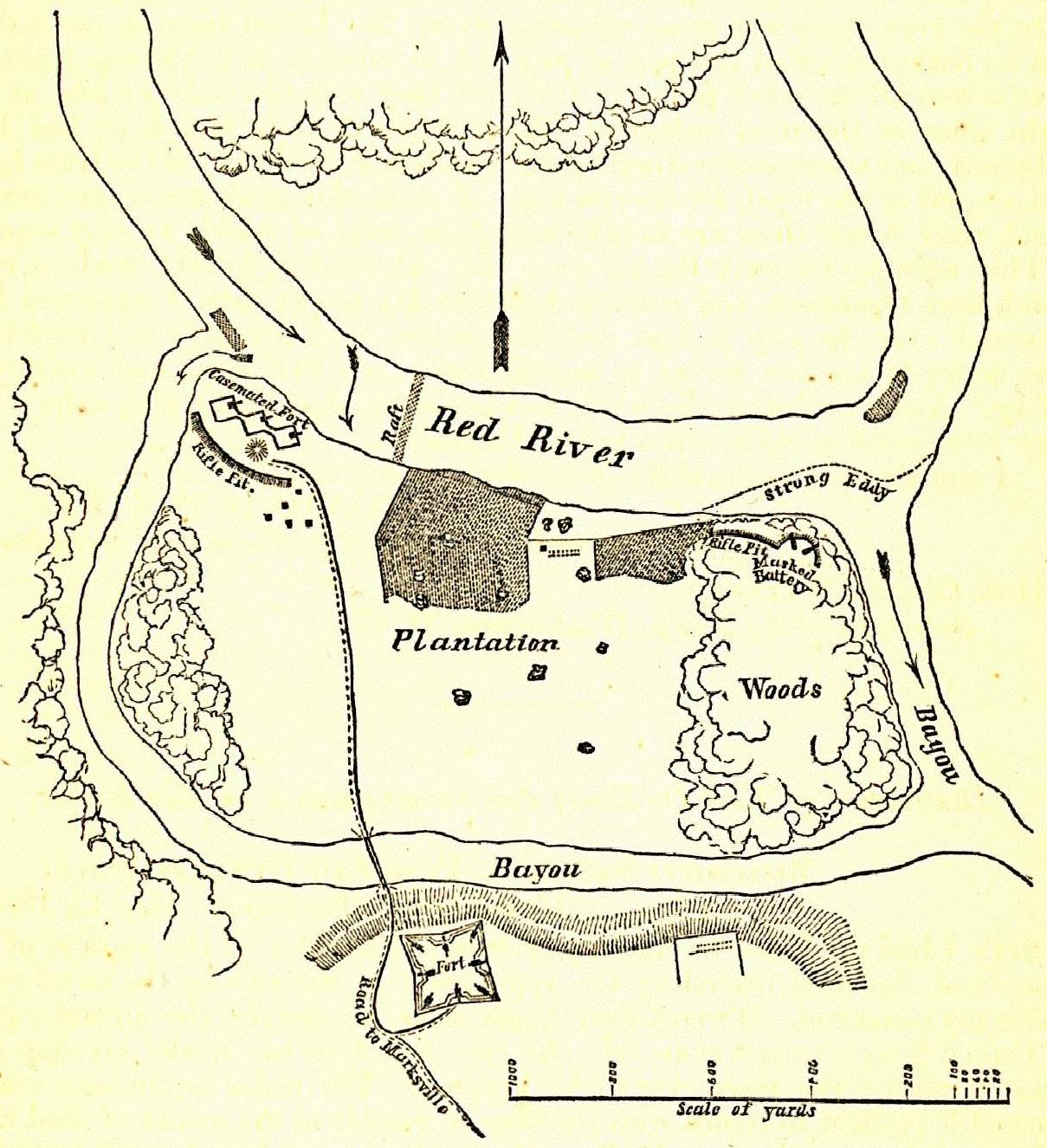
- Plan showing the defenses of Fort DeRussy on the Red River, Louisiana, destroyed May 9, 1863 by the flagship USS Benton (original sketch by Acting Rear Admiral David D. Porter)
| Date | March 14, 1864 |
| Location | Fort DeRussy, Louisiana 31°11′02″N 92°03′16″W |
| Result | Union victory |

Belligerents
| United States (Union) | Confederate States |

Commanders and leaders
| (United States) A.J. Smith (United States) Joseph Mower | (Confederate States of America) William Byrd |

Strength
| 10,000 men | 350 men |

Casualties and losses
| 48 killed and wounded 2 missing | 2 killed 5 wounded 317 captured, |
- Location in Louisiana

The Battle of Fort DeRussy was the first engagement in the Red River Campaign of March–May 1864 in the American Civil War.

The Union Army of the Gulf under General Banks aimed to capture Shreveport, state capital and headquarters of the Confederate command, west of the Mississippi. The operation was spearheaded by General A.J. Smith and Brigadier General Joseph Mower, who surprised and captured Fort DeRussy on March 14, taking over 300 prisoners and the enemy's only heavy guns. The Confederates, under General Richard Taylor, were forced to retreat, leaving south and central Louisiana to the Union forces.

== Background ==
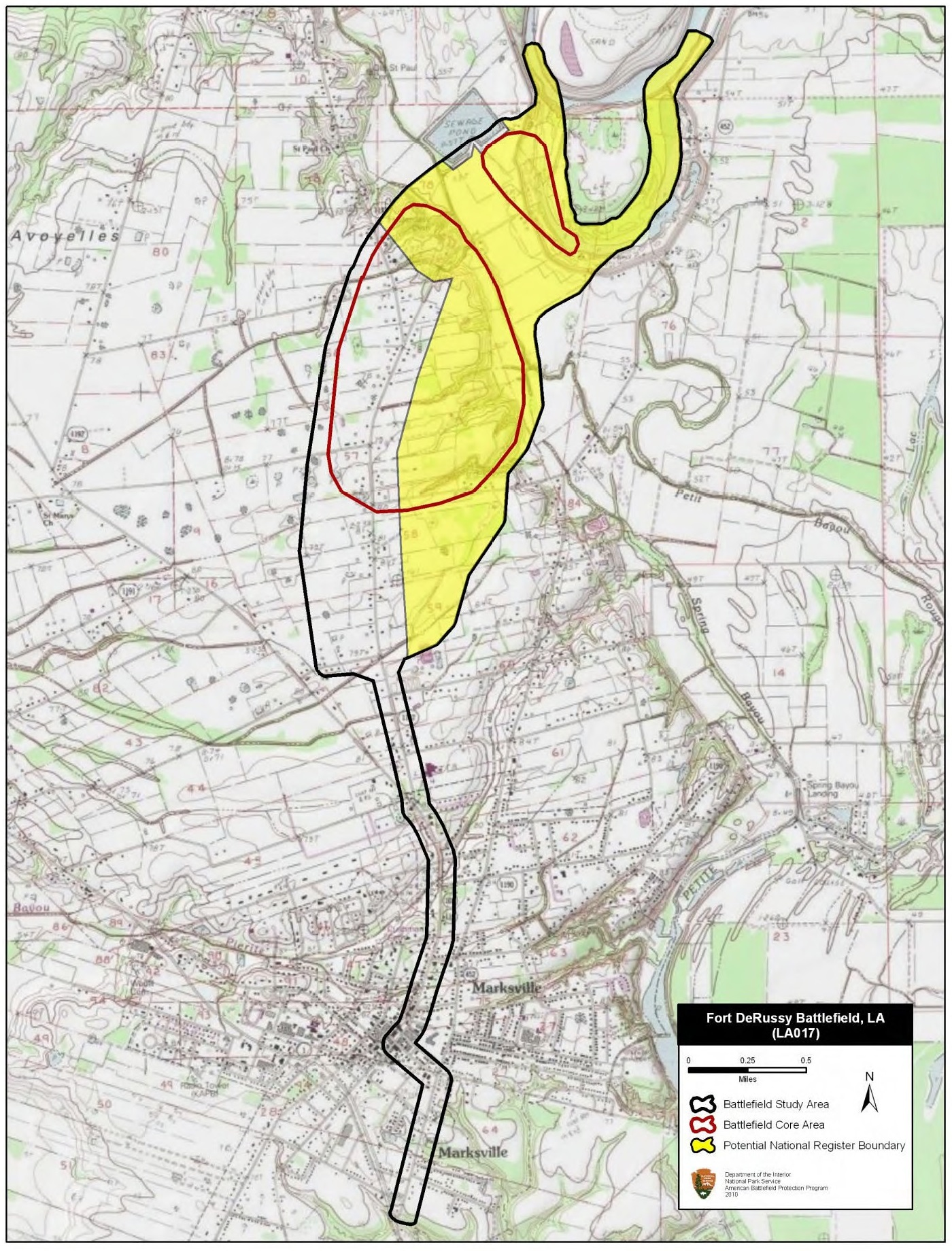
Map of Fort DeRussy Battlefield core and study areas by the American Battlefield Protection Program.

The Union launched a multi-purpose expedition into Confederate Gen. E. Kirby Smith's Trans-Mississippi Department, headquartered in Shreveport, Louisiana, in early 1864. Maj. Gen. Nathaniel P. Banks and Rear Adm. David D. Porter jointly commanded the combined force. Porter's fleet and Brig. Gen. A.J. Smith's XVI and XVII Army Corps detachments of the Army of the Tennessee set out on March 12, 1864, up the Red River, the most direct route to Shreveport. Banks with the XIII and XIX Army Corps advanced by way of Berwick Bay and Bayou Teche. After removing various obstructions that the Rebels had placed in the river, the major impediment to the Union expedition was the formidable Fort DeRussy, an earthen fortification with a partly iron-plated battery designed to resist the fire of Union ironclads that might come up river. Union Brig. Gen. A.J. Smith's command had embarked on transports at Vicksburg and then disembarked at Simmesport, on the 12th, about thirty miles from Fort DeRussy. Smith sent out some troops on the morning of the 13th to determine if any enemy was in their path. This force dispersed and chased an enemy brigade, after which, Smith set his men in motion up the Fort DeRussy road. They did not proceed far before night.

== Battle ==
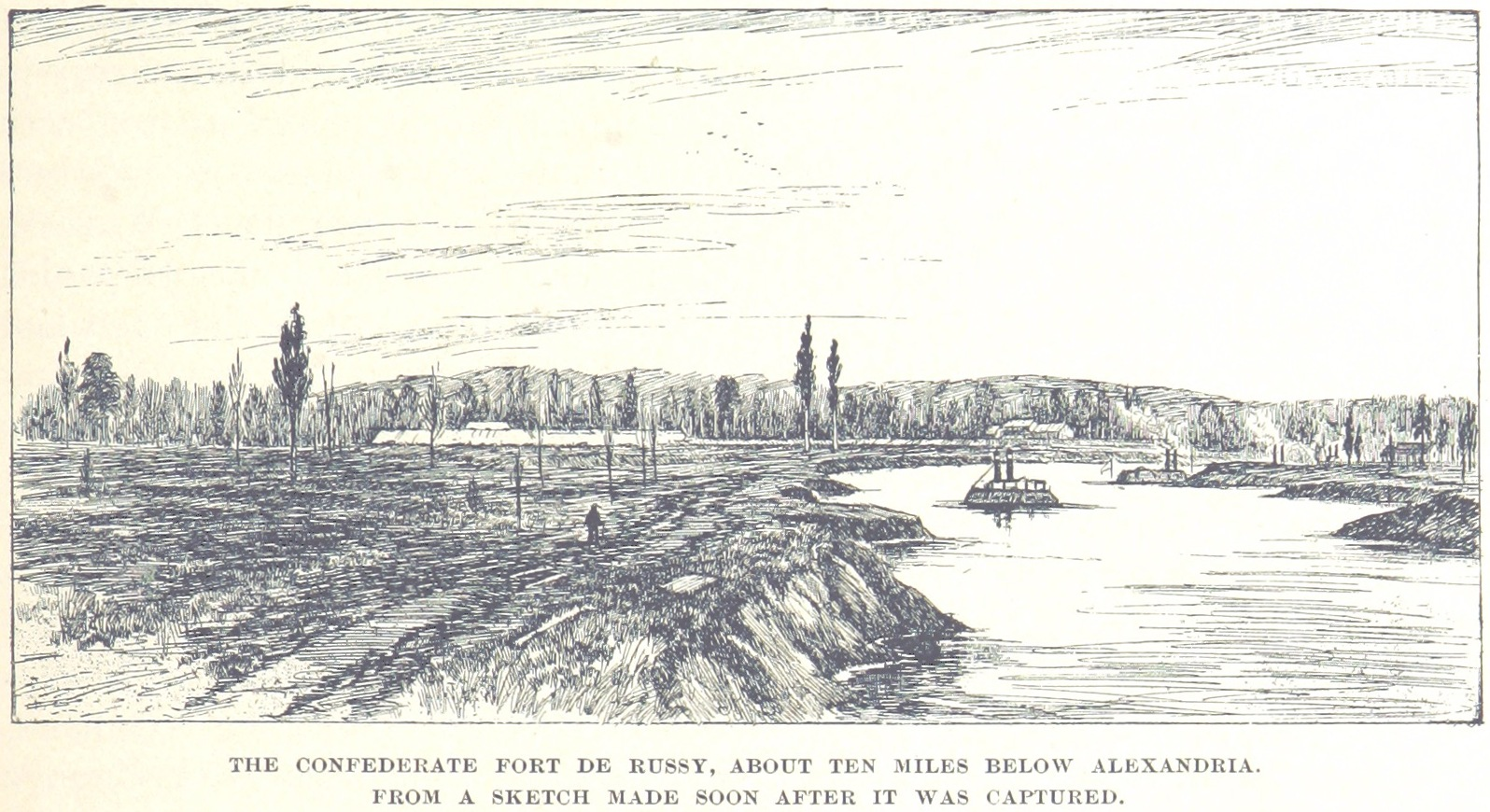
Fort DeRussy after its capture

Early the next morning, March 14, they continued the march, discovering that a Confederate division threatened their advance. Mindful of this threat, Smith had to place part of his command in a position to intercept these Confederate forces if they attacked. Upon arriving at the fort, the enemy garrison of 350 men opened fire. Smith decided to use Mower's division, XVI Army Corps, to take the fort and set about positioning it for the attack. Around 6:30 pm, Smith ordered a charge on the fort and about twenty minutes later, Mower's men scaled the parapet, causing the enemy to surrender.

Fort DeRussy, which some had said was impregnable, had fallen and the Red River to Alexandria was open.

Smith's Union troops captured 2 9-inch Dahlgren guns, 1 rifled 32-pounder gun, 1 32-pounder smoothbore gun, 2 32-pounder carronades, 2 24-pounder long guns, and 2 iron 6-pounder guns.

== Battlefield Preservation ==
The Civil War Trust (a division of the American Battlefield Trust) and its partners have acquired and preserved 73 acres of the Fort DeRussy Battlefield.
