= Joseph A. Mower =

American military officer (1827–1870)

Joseph Anthony Mower
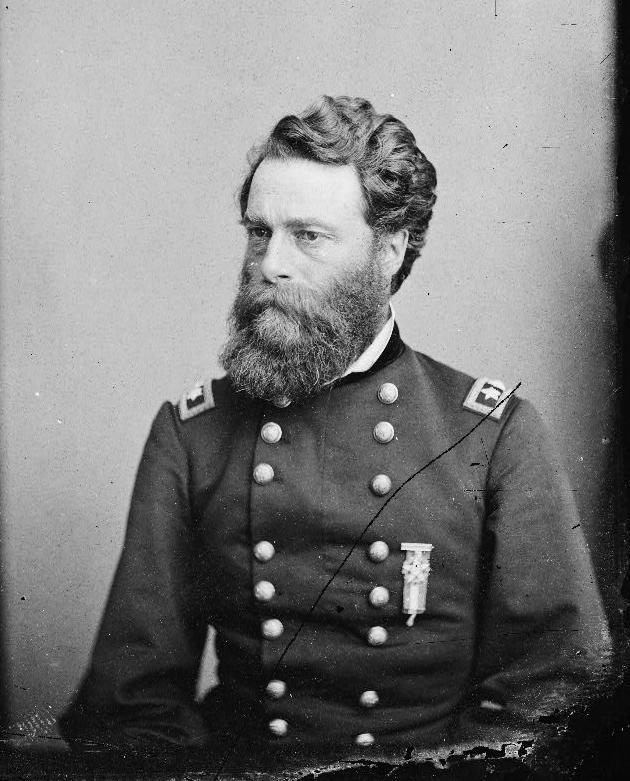
- Maj. Gen. Joseph A. Mower
- Born: August 22, 1827; Woodstock, Vermont, US
- Died: January 6, 1870 (aged 42); New Orleans, Louisiana, US
- Burial place: Arlington National Cemetery
- Military career
- Allegiance: United States of America
- Branch: United States Army; Union Army
- Service years: 1847–1848; 1855–1870
- Rank: Major General
- Unit: 1st U.S. Infantry
- Commands: 11th Missouri Infantry; XX Corps; 39th U.S. Infantry; 25th U.S. Infantry
- Conflicts: Mexican–American War; American Civil War: Battle of Iuka; Battle of Corinth; Battle of Jackson; Siege of Vicksburg; Battle of Richmond; Battle of Fort DeRussy; Battle of Pleasant Hill; Battle of Old River Lake; Battle of Tupelo; Battle of Rivers Bridge; Battle of Bentonville
- Other work: carpenter

Joseph Anthony Mower (August 22, 1827 – January 6, 1870) was a Union general during the American Civil War. He was a competent officer, and he was well respected by his troops and fellow officers. He was known among his troops as "Fighting Joe". Major General William Tecumseh Sherman said of Mower, "he's the boldest young officer we have".

== Biography ==
Mower was born in Woodstock, Vermont. He volunteered as a private in the Mexican–American War. In 1855 he entered the U.S. army as a 2nd Lieutenant in the 1st U.S. Infantry. As part of the 1st US Infantry, Mower saw action in the Battle of Wilson's Creek in August 1861. Still with the regiment during the Battle of Island No. 10, Major-General John Pope selected Mower to construct a siege battery in front of New Madrid, leading to the capture of that river port early in the campaign. He later became colonel of the 11th Missouri Infantry Regiment and fought at the Siege of Corinth. He assumed command of the 2nd Brigade of the 2nd Division in the Army of the Mississippi and led it into action at the Battle of Corinth. He was wounded in the neck and taken prisoner by Confederate forces but he was recovered by Union soldiers the same day.

He was promoted to brigadier general of volunteers on November 29, 1862. He recovered from his wounds and returned to command a brigade during the Vicksburg Campaign and siege of Vicksburg where he caught the attention of William T. Sherman. During the Red River Campaign he commanded the 1st and 3rd Divisions of the XVI Army Corps and won brevets in the regular army for actions at the battles of Fort DeRussy and Yellow Bayou. He commanded the 1st Division of the Right Wing, XVI Corps at the Battle of Tupelo.

He was promoted to major general on August 12, 1864, and General Sherman ordered Mower to join the Union forces in Atlanta. He commanded the 1st Division of the XVII Army Corps during the March to the Sea and the Carolinas campaign. His division played a significant role in the battles of Salkehatchie and Bentonville. Sherman made him commander of XX Corps in the Army of Georgia late in the war. After the fighting had ceased, he sailed for Texas along with General Gordon Granger. He was placed in command of the District of Eastern Texas. After the war he stayed in the army and became Colonel of the 39th U.S. Infantry and the 25th U.S. Infantry. He died in New Orleans, Louisiana, on January 6, 1870.

== See also ==
- List of American Civil War generals (Union)
