= Red River campaign =

Military campaign during the American Civil War

The Red River Campaign
- Part of the American Civil War
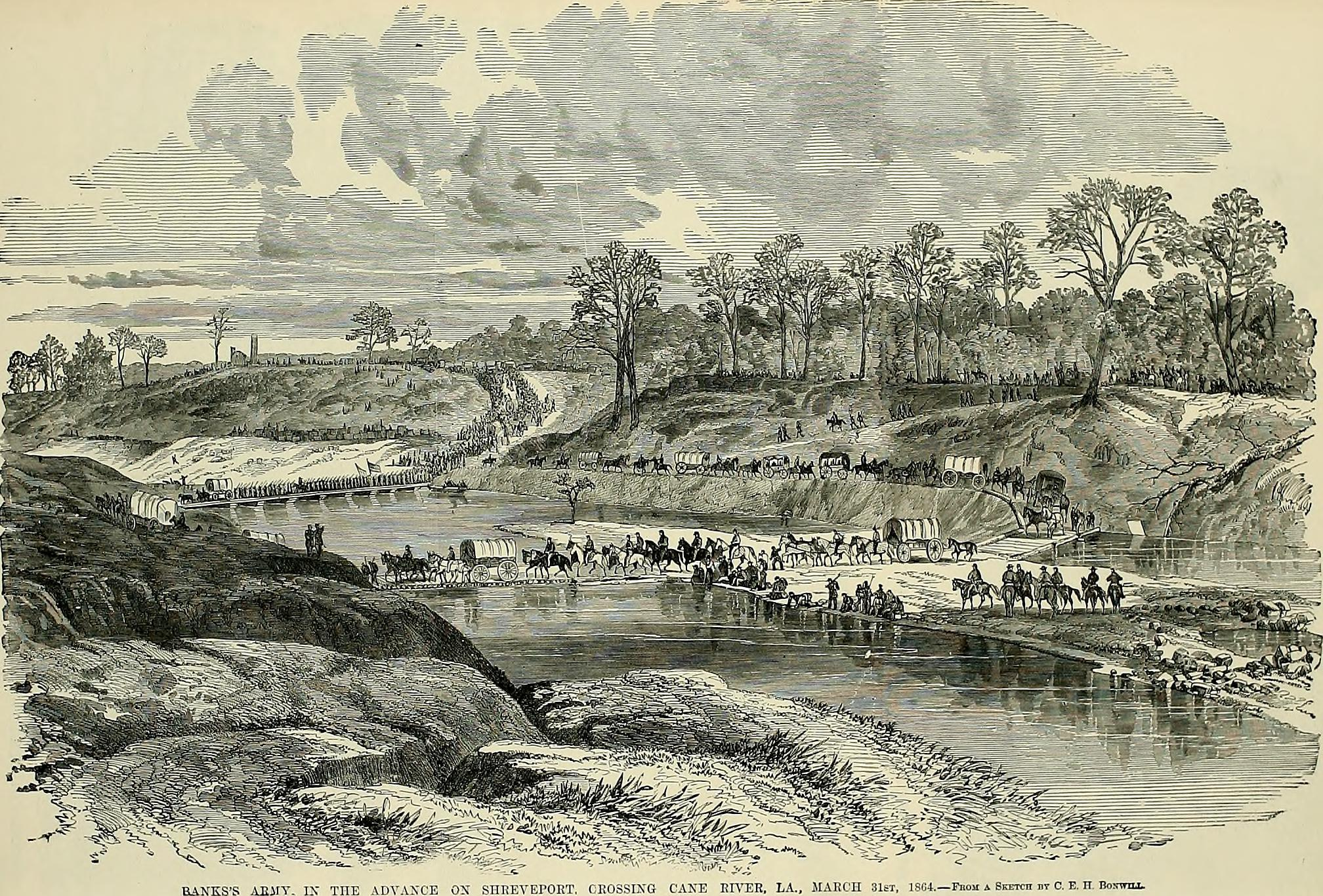
- Banks' army crossing the Cane River, March 31, 1864
Date	March 10 – May 22, 1864 (2 months, 1 week and 5 days)
Location	Red River Valley, Louisiana
Result	Confederate victory

Belligerents
Confederate States	United States

Commanders and leaders
Edmund Smith; Richard Taylor	Nathaniel P. Banks; David Dixon Porter

The Red River campaign, also known as the Red River expedition, was a major Union offensive campaign in the Trans-Mississippi theater of the American Civil War, the campaign taking place from March 10 to May 22, 1864. It was launched through the densely forested Gulf Coastal Plain region between the Red River Valley and central Arkansas towards the end of the war. The offensive was intended to stop Confederate use of the Louisiana port of Shreveport, open an outlet for the sugar and cotton of northern Louisiana, and to split the Confederate lines, allowing the Union to encircle and destroy the Confederate military forces in Louisiana and southern Arkansas. It marked the last major offensive attempted by the Union in the Trans-Mississippi theater.

The expedition was a Union military operation, fought between roughly 35,000 federal troops under the command of Major General Nathaniel P. Banks and Confederate forces under General E. Kirby Smith, whose strength varied from 6,000 to 15,000. The Battle of Mansfield was a major part of the Union offensive campaign, which ended in defeat for General Banks.

The expedition was primarily the plan of Major General Henry W. Halleck, former General-in-Chief of the Armies of the United States. A diversion from Lieutenant General Ulysses S. Grant's plan to surround the main Confederate armies by using Banks' Army of the Gulf to capture Mobile, it was characterized by poor planning and mismanagement, and led to bitter enmity between Major General Richard Taylor and his immediate superior, Kirby Smith, after Smith ordered Taylor to send half of his army to north to Arkansas, rather than south in pursuit of Banks, following the battles of Mansfield and Pleasant Hill.

== Union strategy ==
The Union had four goals at the start of the campaign:

1. Capture of Shreveport, the state capital and headquarters of the Trans-Mississippi Department
2. Destroy Confederate forces in the District of West Louisiana commanded by General Richard Taylor
3. Confiscate as much as 100,000 bales of cotton from the plantations along Red River
4. Organize pro-Union state governments throughout the region under Lincoln's "ten percent" plan

Union strategists in Washington thought that the occupation of East Texas and control of the Red River would separate Texas from the rest of the Confederacy. Texas was the source of much needed guns, food, and supplies for Confederate troops.

Other historians have claimed that the campaign was also motivated by concern regarding the 25,000 French troops in Mexico sent by Napoleon III and under the command of Emperor Maximilian. At the time, the Confederates offered to recognize the government of Maximillian in return for French recognition of the Confederacy; the Confederates also hoped to gain access to valuable war goods through this recognition. However, Banks' campaign on the Texas coast during November and December 1863 had satisfied U.S. President Abraham Lincoln, who wrote to Banks, "My thanks for your successful and valuable operations in Texas."

== Planning ==
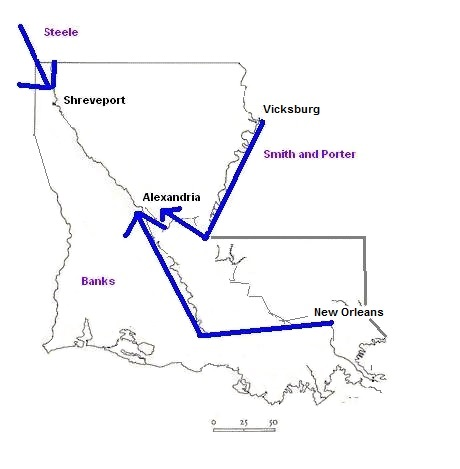
Halleck's plan for the expedition

Halleck's plan, finalized in January 1864, called for Banks to take 20,000 troops upriver from New Orleans to Alexandria, including the 47th Pennsylvania Infantry Regiment, the only regiment from the Keystone State to fight in this campaign, on a route up the Bayou Teche (in Louisiana, the term bayou is used to refer to a slow-moving river or stream), where they would be met by 15,000 troops sent down from Major General William T. Sherman's forces in Vicksburg, Mississippi, and under the command of Brigadier General Andrew J. Smith. Smith's forces were available to Banks only until the end of April, when they would be sent back east, where they were needed for other Union military actions.

Banks would command this combined force of 35,000, which would be supported in its march up the Red River towards Shreveport by Rear Admiral David Dixon Porter's fleet of gunboats. At the same time, 7,000 Union troops from the Department of Arkansas under the command of Major General Frederick Steele would be sent south from Arkansas to rendezvous with Banks in his attack on Shreveport, and to serve as the garrison for that city after its capture.

This plan was ready to be set in action in early March 1864, after somewhat belated communication initiated by Banks to inform Sherman and Porter of their roles in Halleck's strategy. Banks sent Sherman, Halleck, and Porter a report prepared by Major David Houston clearly showing the near-impossibility of maintaining an occupation in Shreveport and East Texas without major resources. Most of Banks' men, accompanied by a large, poorly trained cavalry force would march north toward the middle river. Banks would allow cotton speculators to come along, and Porter was bringing barges to collect cotton as lucrative naval prizes.

Senior staff officers of the Confederate States Army were confused as to whether the Red River region, Mobile Bay, or coastal Texas was the primary objective of the Union army spring 1864 campaign. General E. Kirby Smith, commanding general of the Trans-Mississippi Department, nevertheless started moving many of his troops to the Shreveport area.

== Opposing forces ==
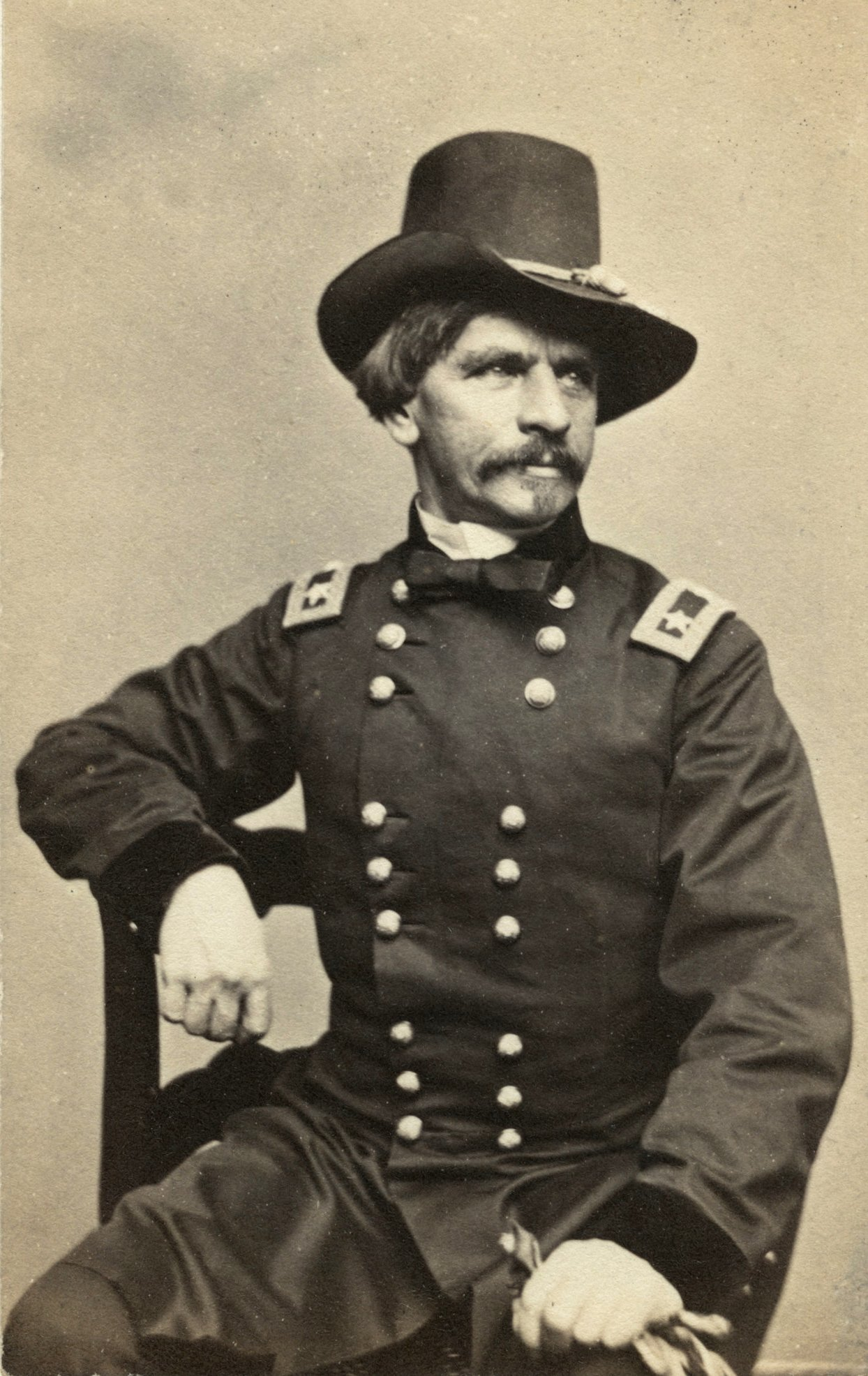
Maj. Gen. Nathaniel P. Banks, commander of the Department of the Gulf

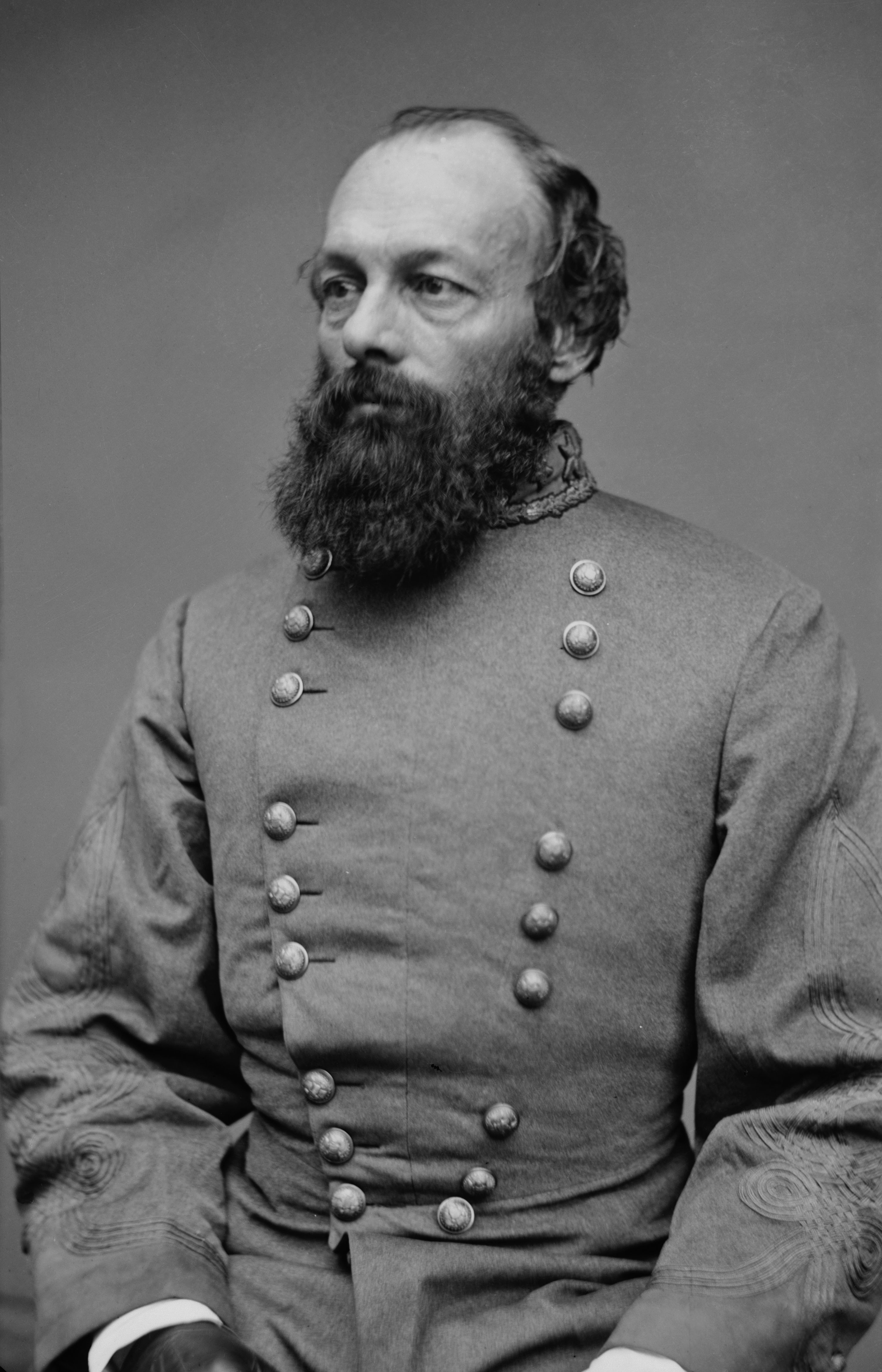
Gen. E. Kirby Smith, commander of the Trans-Mississippi Department

=== Union ===
The Union order of battle at the start of the campaign was as follows:

Department of the Gulf
Major-General Nathaniel P. Banks

19th Army Corps (Major General William B. Franklin)
Detachment of the 13th Army Corps (Brigadier General Thomas E. G. Ransom)
Detachment of the 16th and 17th Army Corps (Brigadier General Andrew J. Smith)
Department of Arkansas (Major General Frederick Steele)
Artillery Reserve (Captain Henry W. Closson)
Cavalry Division (Brigadier-General Albert L. Lee)
1st Brigade, Corps D'Afrique (Colonel William H. Dickey)
Mississippi Squadron (Rear Admiral David D. Porter)

=== Confederate ===
The Confederate order of battle at the start of the campaign was as follows:

Trans-Mississippi Department
General E. Kirby Smith

District of West Louisiana (Major General Richard Taylor)

Walker's Division (Brigadier General John G. Walker)
Mouton's Division (Brigadier-General Alfred Mouton †)
Sub-District of North Louisiana (Brigadier General St. John R. Liddell)
Cavalry Division (Brigadier General Thomas Green †)

Detachment of the District of Arkansas (Brigadier General Thomas J. Churchill)

Missouri Division (Brigadier General M. M. Parsons)
Arkansas Division (Brigadier General James C. Tappan)

== The campaign ==
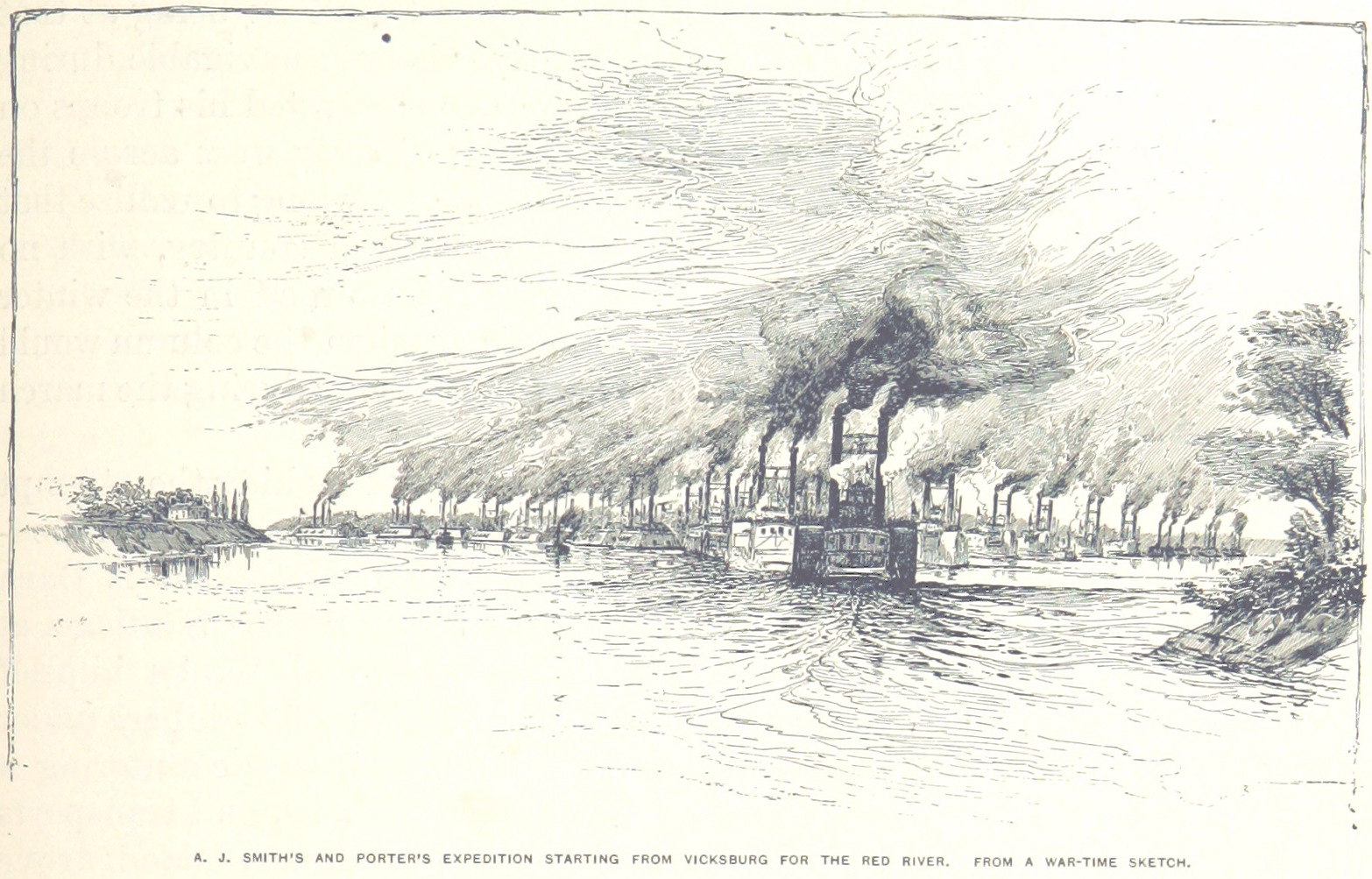
A. J. Smith and Porter's expedition starting from Vicksburg for the Red River

Major General William B. Franklin, commanding the advance divisions of Banks' Army of the Gulf, began his march from southern Louisiana on March 10. Meanwhile, A. J. Smith and his two corps detachments traveled via boat from Vicksburg down to Simmesport. After an all-night march, Smith's men surprised and captured Fort DeRussy on the Red River on March 14, capturing 317 Confederate prisoners and the only heavy guns available to the Confederates. This signaled the beginning of the expedition. Admiral Porter was then able to remove a giant raft blocking the river without much difficulty. Taylor was forced to retreat, abandoning Alexandria, and ceding south and central Louisiana to the Union forces.

Banks' unsuccessful 1864 campaign culminated in his defeat at the battle of Mansfield; blue arrows indicate the movement of Banks' forces, red those of Kirby Smith's forces.

A. J. Smith's force arrived at Alexandria on March 20, 1864, intending to rendezvous with Banks' forces, under the immediate command of Franklin. However, Franklin did not arrive at Alexandria until March 25, 1864, and Banks himself, travelling separately from his troops, did not arrive at Alexandria until March 26, 1864. Banks' failure to arrive in a timely manner for his rendezvous with Smith was the first of many logistical miscues that caused much acrimony between Banks and his subordinates during the expedition. While he waited for Banks to arrive, Smith sent Brigadier General Joseph A. Mower on a successful mission to capture much of Taylor's cavalry and his outpost upriver from Alexandria at the Battle of Henderson's Hill on March 21. Nearly 250 Confederates and a four-gun artillery battery were captured without a shot being fired.

When he arrived at Alexandria, Banks found an important message waiting for him. Two weeks earlier, on March 12, 1864, Lieutenant General Ulysses S. Grant had been named General-in-Chief of the Armies of the United States, replacing Halleck. In Grant's message, he told Banks it was "important that Shreveport be taken as soon as possible," because A. J. Smith's command must be returned to Sherman by the middle of April, "even if it leads to the abandonment of the main object of your expedition."

Kirby Smith had nearly 80,000 men to call upon, but was undecided where to move them to counter the three Union forces now known to be moving toward Shreveport. Taylor would never fight with more than 18,500 men throughout the entire campaign.

By March 31, Banks' men had reached Natchitoches, only 65 miles south of Shreveport. Franklin's men had been delayed most of a week by rain, but it had not mattered because Admiral Porter had a similar delay trying to get his heaviest gunboats over the falls at Alexandria, which was covered with mines because the river had failed to achieve its seasonal rise in water level. Porter had also spent time gathering cotton in the interior, and Banks had conducted an election in the interim. Taylor now stationed himself 25 miles northwest at Pleasant Hill, still with fewer than 20,000 men. Once Banks had assembled more supplies, he continued advancing a week later.

External video
- Book TV interview with Gary Joiner on the Red River Campaign of 1864, February 6, 2012, C-SPAN

Constant cavalry and naval skirmishing had been going on since March 21. On April 2, Brigadier General Albert L. Lee's division of Union cavalry collided with 1,500 arriving Confederate Texas cavalrymen. These Confederates would continue to resist any Union advance. Union intelligence, meanwhile, had determined that additional forces besides Taylor and the cavalry were up the road from them. All of the senior Union officers expressed doubts that any serious Confederate opposition would occur, except for the naval flotilla. Banks' army followed Taylor and the cavalry into a dense pine forest area away from the river, probably to keep them in their front. Approaching Pleasant Hill, the Union army was excessively strung out due both to the existence of only a few camping areas with water and the lack of monitoring of the position of the rear elements. Taylor kept moving back toward Shreveport.

=== Battle of Mansfield ===
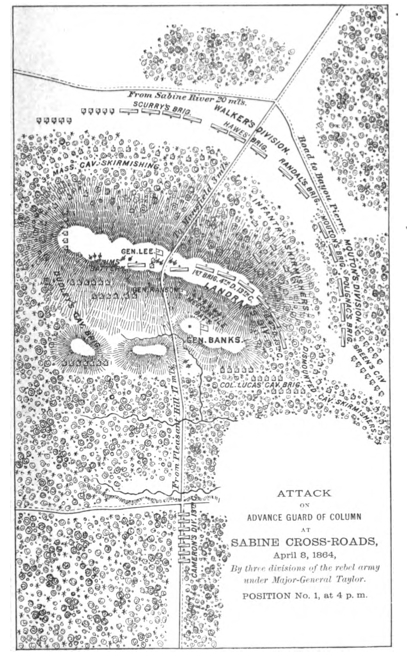
Attack on Banks' advance guard at Sabine Crossroads, April 8, 1864

Heavy cavalry fighting, often dismounted, had continued on April 7 at Wilson's Farm and Tenmile Bayou. On April 8, Lee boldly charged a small force of Confederate cavalry at the Moss Plantation, three miles south of Mansfield, Louisiana, and pushed the Confederate horsemen off Honeycutt Hill. Taylor had stationed one infantry division (led by Brigadier-General Alfred Mouton) in the woods along the edge of the clearing just north of Honeycutt Hill and east of the road. Seeing this increase in enemy strength, Lee requested infantry support. Landram's 2,400-man division of the 13th Corps was sent to Lee's aid and deployed to face Mouton. Banks went to the front to see for himself. Meanwhile, Taylor brought up a second infantry division (Walker's) to the woods on the other side of the road in the middle of the day. The arrival of Walker's division gave Taylor a numerical edge – he had about 9,000 men; Banks had about 5,000 men. More significantly, the Union deployment was aligned to its right, facing Mouton, with only a cavalry brigade holding the left wing.

Taylor had hoped to provoke Banks into attacking him, but following an artillery duel, he became convinced that the Union army was in disarray and would not attack. Around 4:00 pm, Taylor ordered the attack to begin. Mouton led his infantry across an 800-yard-wide field and attacked the Union right, formed behind a rail fence. While Mouton's assault was repulsed by Landram's infantry, Taylor advanced the rest of his entire line, including Walker's division, against the Union left. Walker's men brushed aside the lone cavalry brigade, sweeping in behind the rest of the Union forces. Banks had called for additional reinforcements, but they were too late. The Union line collapsed and a significant number of men from Landram's division were captured. A few hundred yards down the road, the reinforcements – Cameron's division – set up a second line, but this line also broke when faced with Taylor's superior numbers. The wagon train of the Union cavalry obstructed the road, resulting in the loss of artillery, which could not be extracted in the retreat. However, Confederate soldiers halted to loot some of the Union wagons, giving Banks' troops needed time to fall back.

As Confederate command and control was re-established for the pursuit, the men ran into a third Union force, under Brigadier General William H. Emory, about 5,800 men sitting atop a ridge overlooking Chatman's Bayou. The Confederates pushed forward, but Emory's division repulsed attempts to take this location. However, the Union forces did not have control of the precious water in the bayou. During the night, Banks decided to withdraw back to Pleasant Hill because of lack of water and the desire to unite with A. J. Smith's men.

The Battle of Mansfield was over. The Federals suffered around 2,400 casualties, almost half of which were from Landram's division – two of his eight regiments were captured in the battle, and both of his brigade commanders were wounded and captured. The Confederates suffered about 1,000 casualties, including Mouton, who was killed leading his men in the opening charge.

=== Battle of Pleasant Hill ===
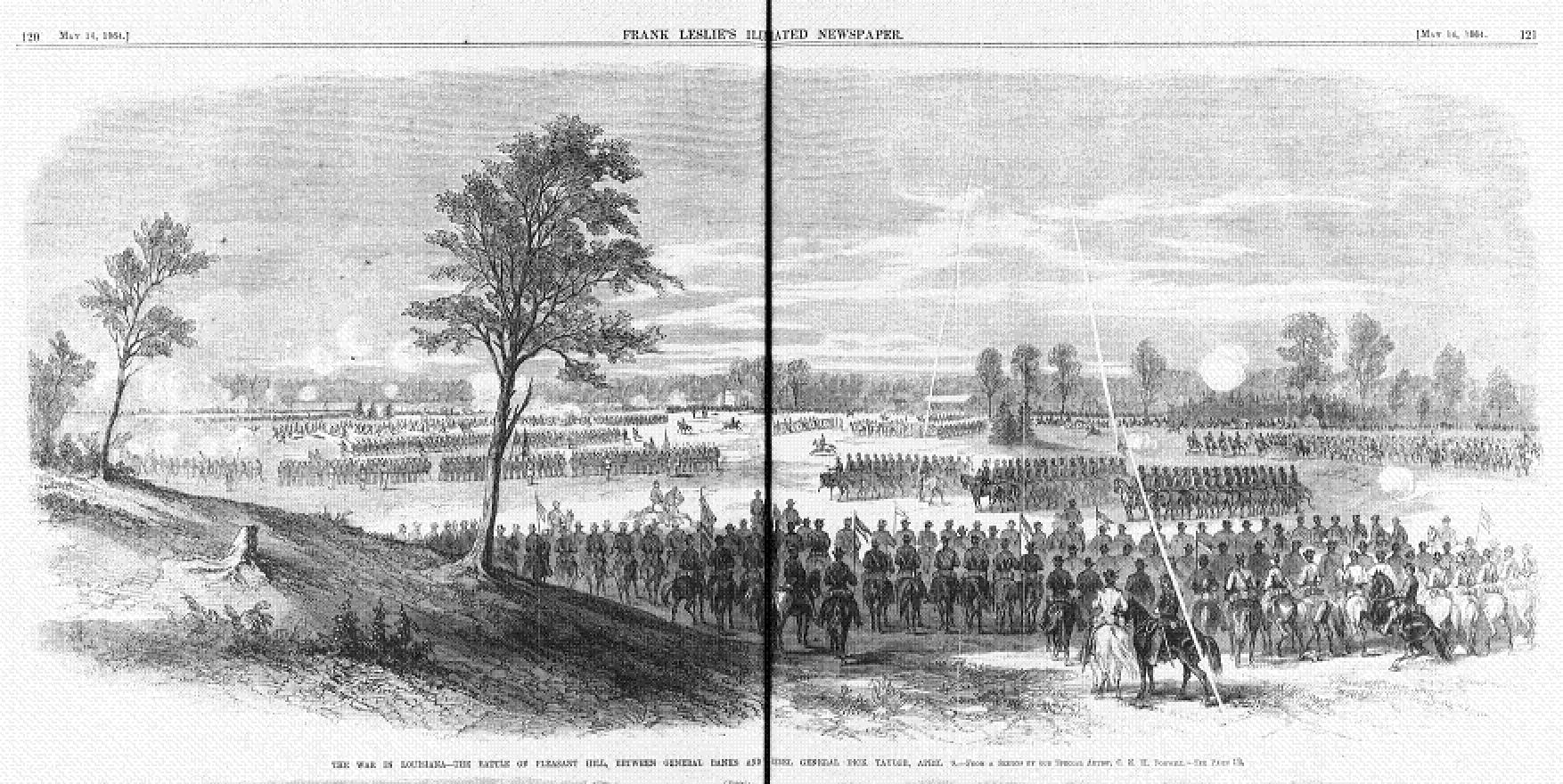
Battle of Pleasant Hill, April 9, 1864

Taylor did not learn of Banks' retreat until dawn the next day; he then ordered an immediate pursuit with Brigadier General Thomas Green's cavalry. When they came upon Banks' line of battle near the town of Pleasant Hill, Taylor had the cavalry retreat a mile and wait for the infantry to arrive, which started arriving shortly after noon. Since the infantry had marched 45 miles in 36 hours, Taylor let them rest for two hours before ordering an attack.

At 4:00 pm the next day, Confederate Brigadier General Thomas J. Churchill's arriving infantry started the attack on the Union forces. Churchill thought he was sending them into the Union flank, but it was actually the center. Confederate cavalry also miscalculated positions and suffered heavily from flank fire. Churchill's men did succeed in collapsing this Union center position, but this also brought his men into the middle of a U-shaped position, with A. J. Smith's unused divisions forming the base of the "U". Though part of the advanced Union right had also collapsed, the forces of Smith and Mower next launched a counterattack, and joined by neighboring regiments, they routed Taylor's men from the vicinity of Pleasant Hill. Some cannon were recaptured.

Short of water and feed for the horses, not knowing where his supply boats were, and receiving divided opinions from his senior officers, Banks ordered a rapid retreat downriver to Natchitoches and Grand Ecore. Both sides at the Battle of Pleasant Hill suffered roughly equal casualties of 1,600. It was a tactical victory for the Federals, but a strategic Confederate one because the Union army retreated following the battle.

More than 2,000 Union soldiers were captured during the battles of Mansfield and Pleasant Hill, many of whom were marched to Camp Ford near Tyler, Texas, where they were held until their release during subsequent prisoner exchanges between the Union and Confederate armies, or until their deaths there from disease or malnutrition.

=== Splitting of General Taylor's command ===
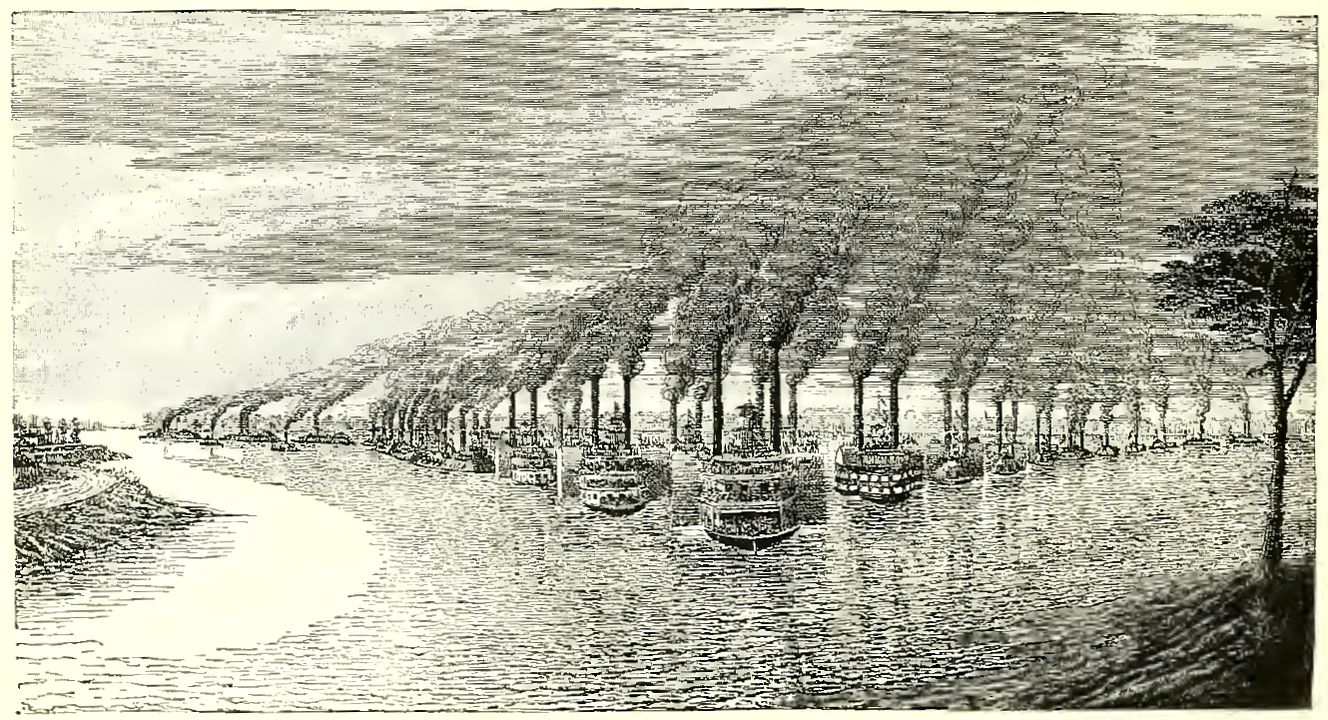
Mississippi River Squadron on the Red River

On the river, the Confederates had diverted water into a tributary, causing the already low Red River level to fall further. When Admiral Porter, slowly heading upriver, learned that Banks was retreating, he followed suit. A brief engagement near Blair's Landing occurred on April 12, in which General Green was decapitated by a naval shell. At Grand Ecore near Natchitoches, Banks received confidential orders from Grant to move the army to New Orleans. The river also continued to fall, and all the supply boats had to return downriver. Sensing that they were involved in a perceived defeat, Banks' relations deteriorated with the cantankerous A. J. Smith and the Navy and with most of the other generals, as well.

General Kirby Smith decided to take three infantry divisions from Major General Richard Taylor and lead them north into Arkansas to crush Steele's army, despite Taylor's strong protests that they should be used against Banks. General Steele never made it to Shreveport, due to supply difficulties and fights with Confederates. The Camden Expedition ended with the Battle of Jenkins' Ferry and Steele retreating to Little Rock. Smith left Taylor with one infantry division and the cavalry with which to continue to harass Banks. Learning that some of Taylor's 5,000 men had gotten south of him and that the fleet had left for Alexandria, Banks ordered a retreat from Grand Ecore. At the Battle of Monett's Ferry on April 23, some of Banks' forces crossed the Cane River on the Confederate flank and forced a division of Confederate cavalry under Brigadier General Hamilton P. Bee to flee. The rest of the march to Alexandria was unremarkable, but Porter ran into a delaying ambush at the mouth of Cane River after he tarried to blow up the stuck USS Eastport.

=== Banks' retreat ===
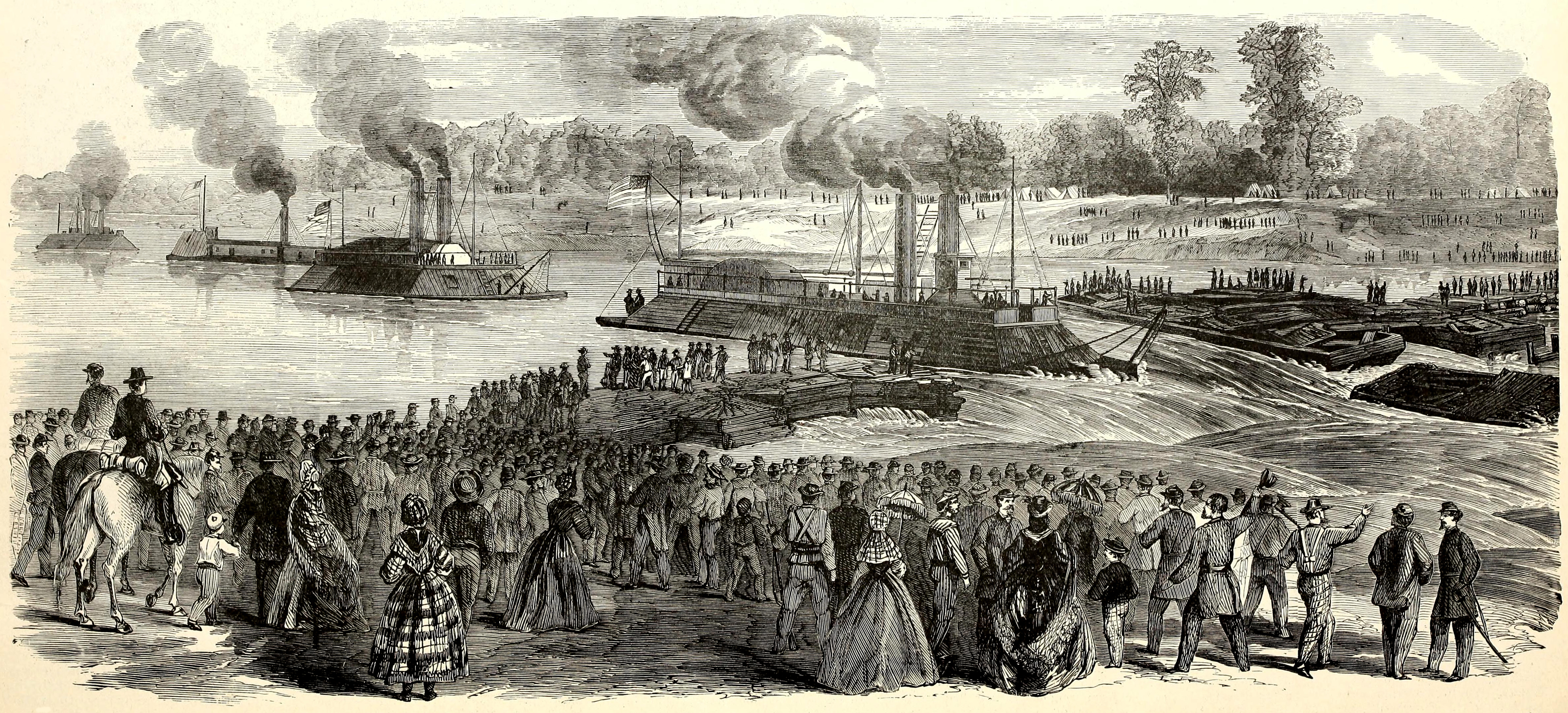
Bailey's Dam at Alexandria, Louisiana

At Alexandria, relations between Banks and many of the others deteriorated further. Each side sent exaggerated accounts to friendly newspapers and supporters. Major General John A. McClernand arrived with reinforcements from Texas, and he had also previously had poor relations with A. J. Smith and Porter. Smith obeyed only those orders he wanted to obey.

Porter could not get many of his ironclads over the falls at Alexandria. Colonel Joseph Bailey designed Bailey's Dam, to which Banks soon gave night-and-day attention. Several boats got through before a partial dam collapse. An extra upriver dam provided additional water depth, allowing the march to resume. When the Federals left Alexandria, the town went up in flames, the origins of which are disputed. Because the Confederates had already burned most of the cotton, many speculators at Alexandria were disappointed.

Taylor attempted to fool the Union command into believing many more men were present, but he did not try to stop the dam construction. He did shut down the lower river by attacking boats. Yet though General Taylor had promised to prevent the escape of the Federals, he could not do so. He blamed Kirby Smith for lack of support. En route to the Mississippi, an engagement at Mansura on May 16 was fought with almost no casualties. Yellow Bayou, the final conflict of the campaign, took place on May 18 with significant casualties in a burning forest. Transport ships were lashed together to allow Union forces to cross the wide Atchafalaya River. General Banks, on arrival near the Mississippi, was met by Brigadier General Edward Canby, who had been named Banks's superior in a newly created regional department.

== Aftermath ==
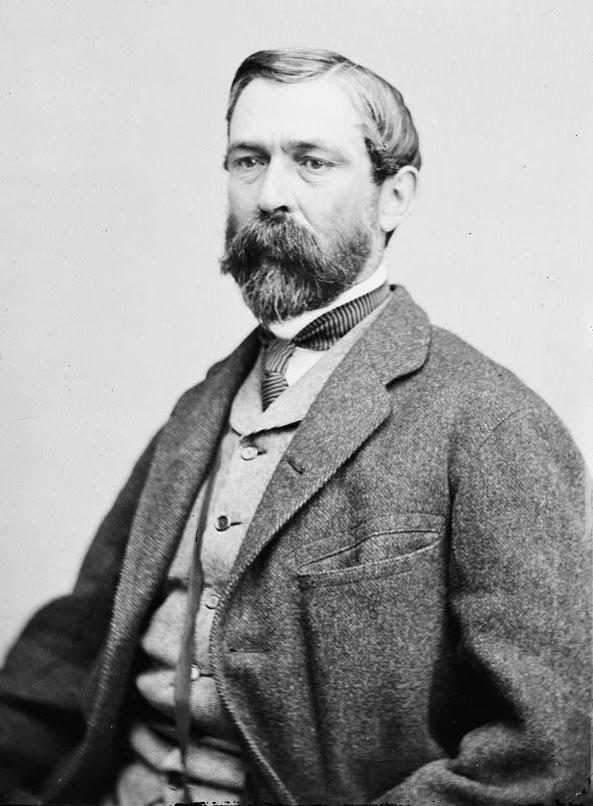
Richard Taylor in later years

The expedition was a Union failure, the outcome of which did not have a major impact on the war. Conversely, it may have extended the length of the war by several months, as it diverted Union efforts from the far more important objective of capturing Mobile, Alabama. That event did not occur until 1865, and could probably have been accomplished by June 1864 if not for the Red River campaign.

The failure of the expedition effectively ended the military career of Banks, and controversy surrounding his retreat, the presence of cotton speculators, and the use of military boats to remove cotton dogged his early postbellum congressional campaigns. Admiral Porter realized a substantial sum of money during the expedition from the sale of cotton as prizes of war.

The Confederates lost two key commanders, Mouton and Green, and suffered casualties they could not afford. Perhaps more importantly, relations between the aggressive Taylor and cautious Smith were permanently damaged by their disagreement over Smith's decision to remove half of Taylor's troops following the Battle of Pleasant Hill. The lost opportunity to capture the entire Union fleet as it lay helpless above the falls at Alexandria haunted Taylor to his dying day; he was certain that Smith had robbed him a chance to cripple the Union forces. The arguments between the two generals resulted in Taylor's transfer to command of the Department of East Louisiana, Mississippi, and Alabama soon after the campaign ended.
