= 13th Texas Infantry Regiment =

- Active: September 1861 – June 1865
- Country: Confederate States of America
- Allegiance: Confederate States of America, Texas
- Branch: Confederate States Army
- Type: Infantry
- Size: Regiment (352 men, Apr. 1864)
- Engagements: American Civil War

Commanders
- Notable commanders: Joseph Bates

The 13th Texas Infantry Regiment was a unit of volunteers recruited in Texas that fought in the Confederate States Army during the American Civil War. The regiment organized between September 1861 and January 1862, and was originally called the 4th Texas Volunteer Regiment. It spent its entire existence patrolling the Texas Gulf Coast between Matagorda and Galveston. The unit was actually made up of infantry, cavalry, and artillery units, but was not designated a legion. In April 1862, four infantry companies transferred to the 15th Texas Infantry Regiment, while three cavalry and one artillery company transferred to Reuben R. Brown's 12th Texas Cavalry Battalion. In fall 1863, three additional infantry companies of the 13th Texas Infantry were added when the 12th Cavalry Battalion consolidated with Lee C. Rountree's Cavalry Battalion to form the 35th (Brown's) Texas Cavalry Regiment. The regiment's soldiers suffered from poor morale due to the lack of military action, disease, monotony, and lack of food. The troops were only involved in a few skirmishes with the United States Navy. The formal surrender date was in June 1865, but by that time most of the soldiers had returned home.

== See also ==
- List of Texas Civil War Confederate units
- Texas in the American Civil War
