= 1st Texas Cavalry Regiment =

1st Texas Cavalry Regiment may refer to:

- 1st Texas Cavalry Regiment (Confederate)
- 1st Texas Cavalry Regiment (Union)
- 1st Texas Cavalry Regiment (Arizona Brigade), a Confederate regiment
- 1st Texas Partisan Rangers, a Confederate unit

== See also ==
- 1st Texas Infantry Regiment
- 1st Texas Field Battery
