= 21st Texas Infantry Regiment =

- Active: 1862 – May 1865
- Country: Confederate States of America
- Allegiance: Confederate States of America, Texas
- Branch: Confederate States Army
- Type: Infantry
- Size: Regiment (249 men, spring 1864)
- Engagements: American Civil War; Battle of Calcasieu Pass (1864)

Commanders
- Notable commanders: Ashley W. Spaight

The 21st Texas Infantry Regiment was a unit of volunteers recruited in Texas that fought in the Confederate States Army during the American Civil War. The regiment was formed in spring 1864 by consolidating William Henry Griffin's 21st Texas Infantry Battalion and Ashley W. Spaight's 11th Texas Cavalry Battalion. Spaight became colonel and Griffin became lieutenant colonel. Spaight's 11th Battalion existed as early as September 1862 with a strength of 400 men. In the 21st Regiment's only notable action, it ambushed and captured two Union gunboats in the Battle of Calcasieu Pass on 24 April 1864. The unit's duties were mainly guarding the Texas Gulf Coast. It moved to Marshall, Texas, in the winter of 1864–1865, then marched to Shreveport, Louisiana. In April 1865, the regiment returned to Texas before disbanding in May.

== See also ==
- List of Texas Civil War Confederate units
- Texas in the American Civil War
