= Dillard Rucker Fant =

American cattle driver and soldier (1841–1908)

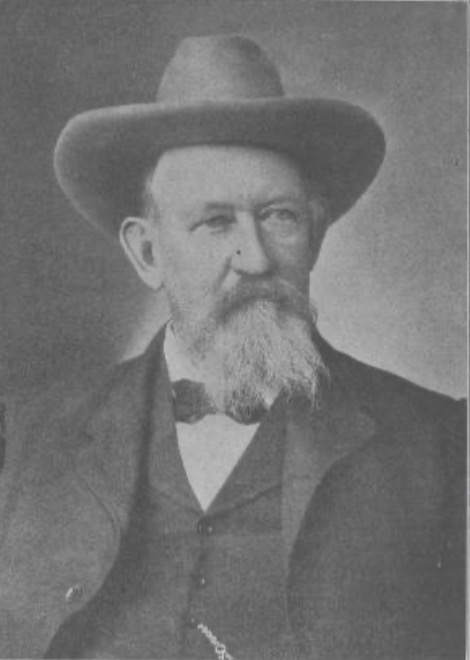
- Born: July 21, 1841; Anderson, South Carolina, US
- Died: January 15, 1908 (aged 66); Goliad County, Texas, US
- Occupation: Cattle drover
- Military career
- Unit: 21st Texas Infantry Regiment
- Conflicts: American Civil War

Dillard Rucker Fant (July 21, 1841 – January 15, 1908) was an American cattle driver and soldier.

== Biography ==
Fant was born on July 21, 1841, in Anderson, South Carolina. His father was William A. Fant, who would later serve as county judge of Goliad County, Texas, and his mother was Mary A. Fant (née Burriss). They moved to Goliad County in 1852. Fant received little schooling, and instead grew in knowledge by befriending intelligent businessmen. As a young adult, Fant worked transporting goods on ox-wagon between Goliard County and Indianola, a port city.

During the American Civil War, Fant enlisted in the 21st Texas Infantry Regiment, serving in company "K", under Benjamin F. Carter. On October 15, 1865, Fant married Lucy A. Hodges, daughter of colonel John Hodges.

From 1867 to 1869, Fant drove cattle to Rockport, later droving to Kansas in 1869. He held government contracts to bring cattle to Wyoming, Nebraska, Idaho and the Dakota Territory. He brought between 175,000 and 200,000 cattle there in fifteen years of work. He helped extend the Chisholm Trail to Corpus Christi. He also worked alongside George Washington West.

Fant stopped droving by 1889, selling all the cattle for $1,000,000. He used this money to purchase 700,000 acres of ranchland in Refugio, Frio, Live Oak and Tarrant Counties, among others. George W. Saunders apprenticed under him.

Fant retired in April 1901, moving to the King William District in San Antonio. He died on January 15, 1908, aged 66, during a visit to Goliad County.
