= List of Confederate units from Texas in the American Civil War =

This is a list of Texas American Civil War Confederate Units. The Texas Union Army units are listed separately.

== Confederate States Army ==
=== Major Formations ===
- Walker's Texas Division (Walker's Greyhounds)
- Texas Brigade

=== Infantry ===
- 1st Texas Infantry Regiment (2nd Infantry, Ragged Old First)

- Company A (Marion Guards)
- Company B (Livingston Guards)
- Company C (Palmer Guards)
- Company D (Star Rifles)
- Company E (Corsicana Invincibles; Marshall Guards)
- Company F (Woodsville Rifles)
- Company G (Anderson Co. Guards; Reagan Guards)
- Company H (Texas Guards)
- Company I (Crockett Southerns)
- Company K (Daniel Boone Rifles; Texas Invincibles)
- Company L (Lone Star Rifles)
- Company M (Sumter Light Infantry)

- 1st Infantry, Consolidated (6th, 7th & 10th Infantry, 15th, 17th, 18th, 24th & 25th Cavalry)
- 2nd Texas Infantry Regiment (Moore's 1st Infantry; Galveston Regiment; Van Dorn Regiment)

- Company A (San Jacinto Guards)
- Company B (Confederate Guards)
- Company C (Bayland Guards)
- Company D (Confederate Grays)
- Company E
- Company F (Mounted Riflemen)
- Company G (Burleson Guards)
- Company H (Lexington Grays)
- Company I (Gonzales Invincibles; Wilson Rifles)

- 3rd Texas Infantry Regiment (Luckett's 1st Infantry)

- Company A (Gillespie Rifles)
- Company B
- Company C (Lone Star Defenders)

- 4th Texas Infantry Regiment (Hood's Regiment; John Bell Regiment)
- 5th Texas Infantry Regiment (Archer's Regiment)
- 6th Texas Infantry Regiment (Likens's Battalion; Garland's Regiment; 1st Infantry, Consolidated)
- 7th Texas Infantry Regiment (Gregg's Regiment; 1st Infantry, Consolidated)

- Company A (Waco Guards)
- Company B (Johnson Guards)
- Company C
- Company E (Cherokee Rifles)
- Company A (Van Dorn Guards)
- Company B (Ruess Battery)

- 8th Texas Infantry Regiment (Hobby`s)
- 9th Texas Infantry Regiment (Young's; Maxey's 8th Infantry)

- Company A (German Citizen Guards)
- Company B (Galveston Guards; German Citizen Guards)
- Company C (German Citizen Guards)
- Company D (Cypress Rifles)

- 9th Texas Infantry Regiment (Nichols's 5th Infantry) (6 months)
- 10th Texas Infantry Regiment (Nelson's Regiment; 1st Infantry, Consolidated)

- Company A (Grimes Boys)
- Company B
- Company C (Alvarado Rifles)
- Company D (Wilson's Guards)
- Company E
- Company F
- Company G (Labadie Rifles)
- Company H (Coryell Yankee Hunters)
- Company I
- Company K

- 11th Texas Infantry Regiment (Roberts's Rangers)

- Company A (Engledow's Texas Rebels)
- Company D (Titus Hunters)

- 12th Texas Infantry Regiment (Young's 8th Infantry)

- Company A (Lavaca County)
- Company B (Nacogdoches County)
- Company C (Robertson County)
- Company D (Grimes County)
- Company E (Tarrant County)
- Company F (Milam County)
- Company G (Grimes County)
- Company I (Freestone County)
- Company K (Hill County)

- 13th Texas Infantry Regiment (Bates's Infantry Battalion)

- Company A (Austin Grays)
- Company B (Perkins' 1st Company; Austin Grays)
- Company D (Moseley's Battery)
- Company E
- Company G (Brazoria Rangers)
- Company H (Field Battery)

- 14th Texas Infantry Regiment (Clark's Regiment)

- Company D

- 15th Texas Infantry Regiment (Speight's Regiment)

- Company E (Navarro Countians)
- Company G (Fouty's Company)

- 16th Texas Infantry Regiment (Flournoy's 7th Infantry)
- 17th Texas Infantry Regiment (Allen's Regiment)
- 18th Texas Infantry Regiment (Ochiltree's Regiment)
- 19th Texas Infantry Regiment (Waterhouse's Regiment)
- 20th Texas Infantry Regiment (Elmore's Regiment)
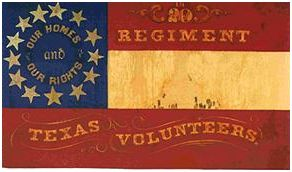
  Flag of the 20th Texas Infantry
- 21st Texas Infantry Regiment (Speight's Battalion; Swamp Angels; Spaight's Regiment)

- Company A (Sabine Pass Guard)
- Company B
- Company C
- Company D
- Company E
- Company F

- 22nd Texas Infantry Regiment (Hubbard's Battalion)

- Company F

- 1st Infantry Battalion (15th Infantry)
- 1st Infantry Battalion (Burnet's Sharp Shooters)
- 4th Infantry Battalion (Oswald's German Battalion) (6 months)
- 5th Infantry Battalion (22nd Infantry)
- 6th Infantry Battalion (11th Infantry & Cavalry Battalion)
- 8th Infantry Battalion (Hobby's Battalion; 8th Infantry)
- 21st Infantry Battalion (Griffin's Battalion; 21st Infantry)

=== Cavalry ===
==== Brigades ====
- Texas Cavalry Brigade Whitfield's Brigade; Ross' Brigade

Organized OCTOBER 23, 1862 in Mississippi with 3rd, 6th, 9th, and 27th Texas Cavalry Regiments. Temporary commanded by Lieutenant Colonel Griffith while Colonel Whitfield and Lieutenant Colonel Ross were on convalescence leave.

==== Regiments ====
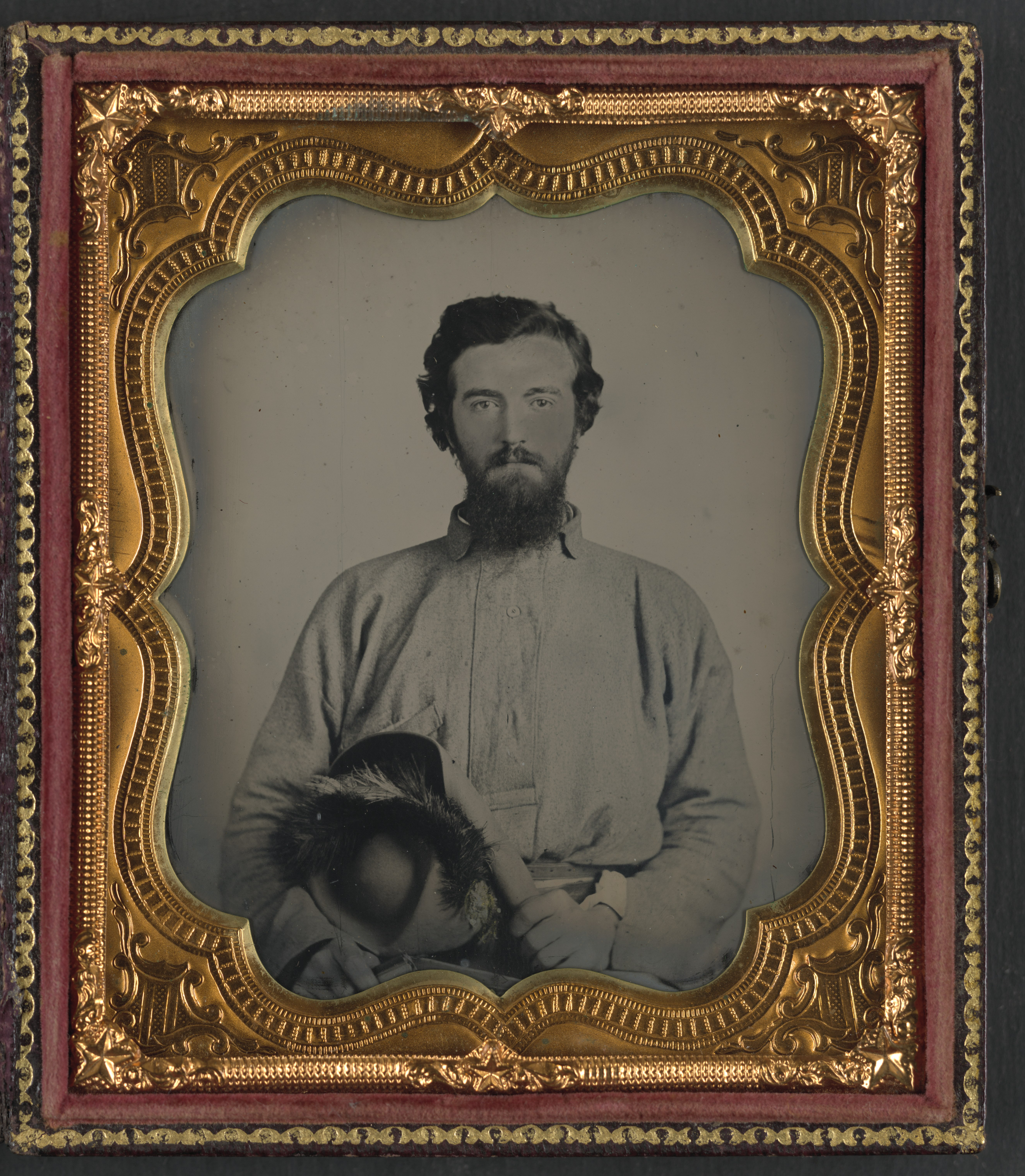
Private Benjamin W. Varnell of Co. B, 1st Texas Cavalry Regiment with plumed had

- 1st (McCulloch's) Mounted Riflemen

State service, March 4, 1861 - mid-April 1861. Confederate service, mid-April 1861 - mid-April 1862 as the First Regiment, Texas Mounted Riflemen, also known as the First Texas Mounted Rifles (mustered out at the expiration of the enlistment period). Some of the men returned to frontier service, but most enlisted in the Eighth Texas Cavalry Battalion, which later became part of the First Texas Cavalry Regiment (Buchel's).

- 1st Texas Cavalry Regiment (Buchel's; Yager's 1st Mounted Rifles)

- Company H (Rusk Co. Volunteers)

- 2nd Texas Cavalry Regiment (2nd Mounted Rifles; Chisum's Regiment; Partisan Rangers)

- Company B (German Company; Gidding's Battalion; Carrington's Company)
- Company E (Texas Rangers)
- Company F (Mounted Riflemen; W.P. Lane Rangers)
- Company K
- Coopwood's Spy Company (attached)

- 3rd Texas Cavalry Regiment (Greer's Regiment; South Kansas-Texas Mounted Volunteers)

- Company A Harrison County (The Texas Hunters)
- Company B Rusk County
- Company C Cherokee County (Lone Star Defenders)
- Company D Hunt County
- Company E Shelby County
- Company F Kaufman County
- Company G Marion County (Dead Shot Rangers)
- Company H Upshur County
- Company I Cass County
- Company K (Flora Legion)

- 4th Texas Cavalry Regiment (4th Mounted Volunteers; 1st Regiment, Sibley's Brigade)

- Company A
- Company B (Davis Guards; Dockwallopers)
- Company C (Victoria Volunteers; Victoria Invincibles)
- Company D (San Andres Light Horse Company)
- Company E (Milam Co. Guards)

- 5th Texas Cavalry Regiment (5th Mounted Volunteers; 2nd Regiment, Sibley's Brigade)

- Company I (Killough's Volunteer Company, Fayette County)

- 6th Texas Cavalry Regiment (Stone's Regiment; 2nd Cavalry)

- Company A Kaufman County (Rockwall cavalry)
- Company B Kaufman County (Rockwall Cavalry)
- Company C Dallas County
- Company D Greyson County (Bear Skins)
- Company E Van Zandt County (Wide Awakes)
- Company F Dallas County (Lancaster Guards)
- Company G McLennan County
- Company H Bell County (Bob Whites)
- Company I Henderson County (Titus Greys)
- Company K Collin County (Mounted Riflemen)

- 7th Texas Cavalry Regiment (7th Mounted Volunteers; 3rd Regiment, Sibley's Brigade)
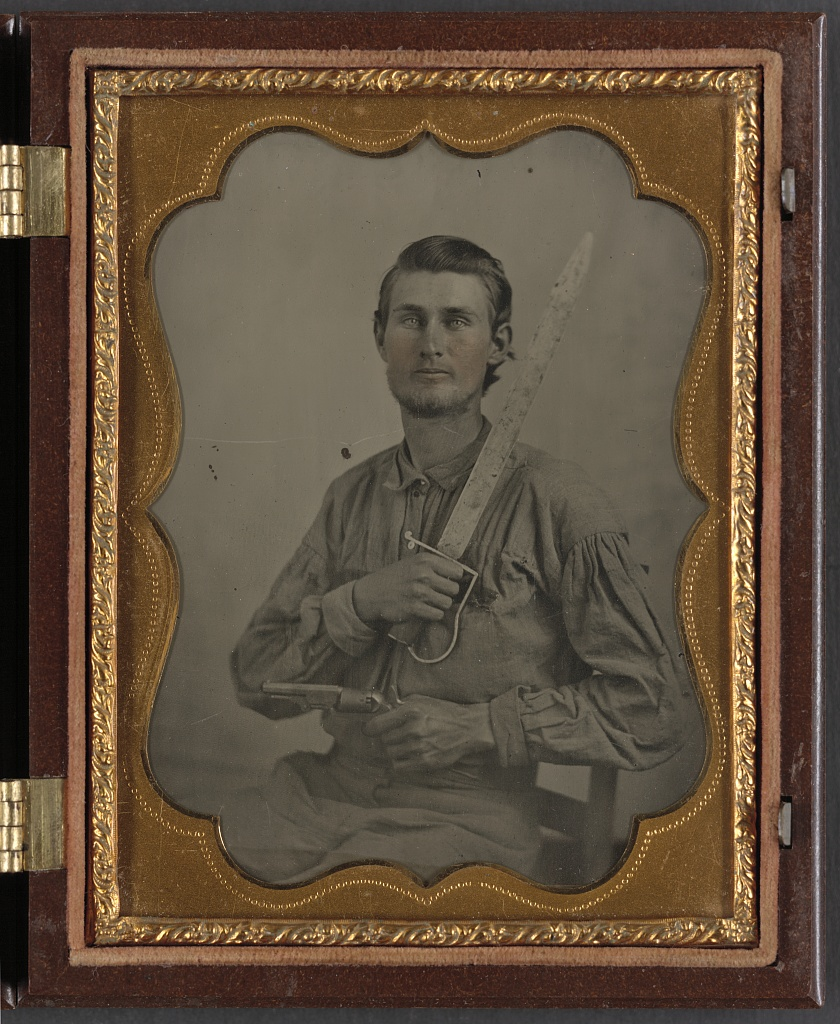
  Private Simeon J. Crews of Co. F, 7th Texas Cavalry Regiment, with cut down saber and revolver

- Company A
- Company B (Comal Co.; Hoffmann's Company; German Company)
- Company C (Williamson Co. Grays)
- Company D (Angelina Troop)
- Company E (Trinity Co. Cavalry)
- Company F (New Salem Invincibles)
- Company I (Anderson Co. Company of Cavalry)

- 8th Texas Cavalry Regiment (Terry's Texas Rangers)
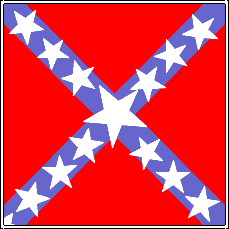
  Flag attributed to Terry's Texas Rangers

- Company B (Mounted Rangers)
- Company F (Lone Star Rangers)
- Company K (Tom Lubbock Guards)
- Company L (Wharton Guards)

- 9th Texas Cavalry Regiment (Sims's 4th Cavalry)

- Company A Tarrant County (Volunteers)
- Company B Fannin County (Red River Boys)
- Company C Grayson County
- Company D Tarrant County
- Company E San Augustine County (Cypress Rangers)
- Company F Titus County
- Company G Hopkins County
- Company H Dallas County (Sharpshooters)
- Company I Titus County (Titus Grays)
- Company K Hopkins County

- 10th Texas Cavalry Regiment (Locke's Regiment)
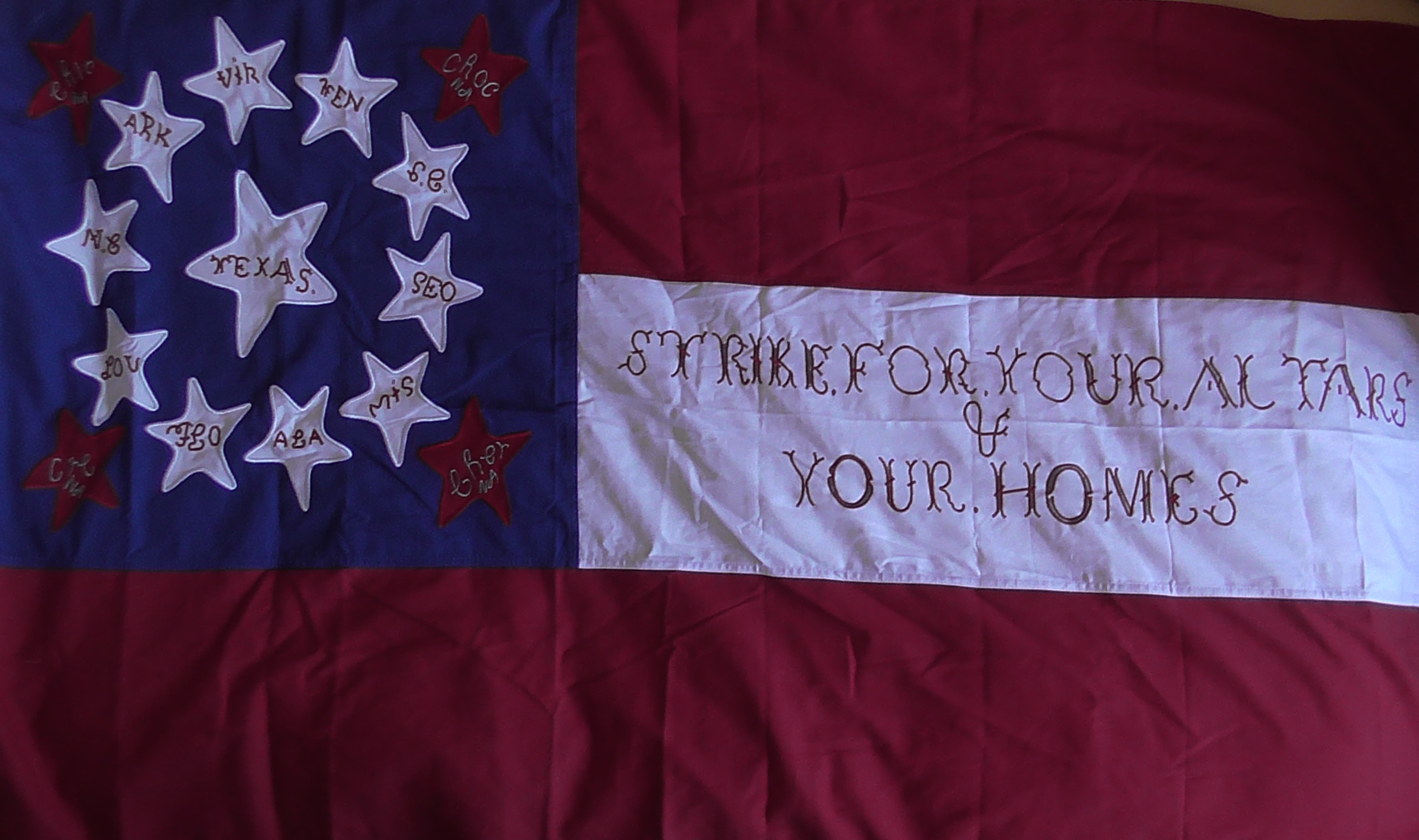
  An example of the 10th Texas Cavalry standard

- Company B (Wood Co. Rebels)

- 11th Texas Cavalry Regiment (Young's 3rd Cavalry)
  Flag of the 11th Texas Cavalry

- Company B (Holford Cavalry)
- Company E (Red River Dixie Boys)

- 12th Texas Cavalry Regiment (Parsons's 4th Mounted Dragoons)
- 13th Texas Cavalry Regiment (Burnett's Mounted Volunteers)

- Company G (Dreadnaughts)

- 14th Texas Cavalry Regiment (Johnson's Mounted Volunteers; Camp's; 1st Regiment, Johnson's Brigade)
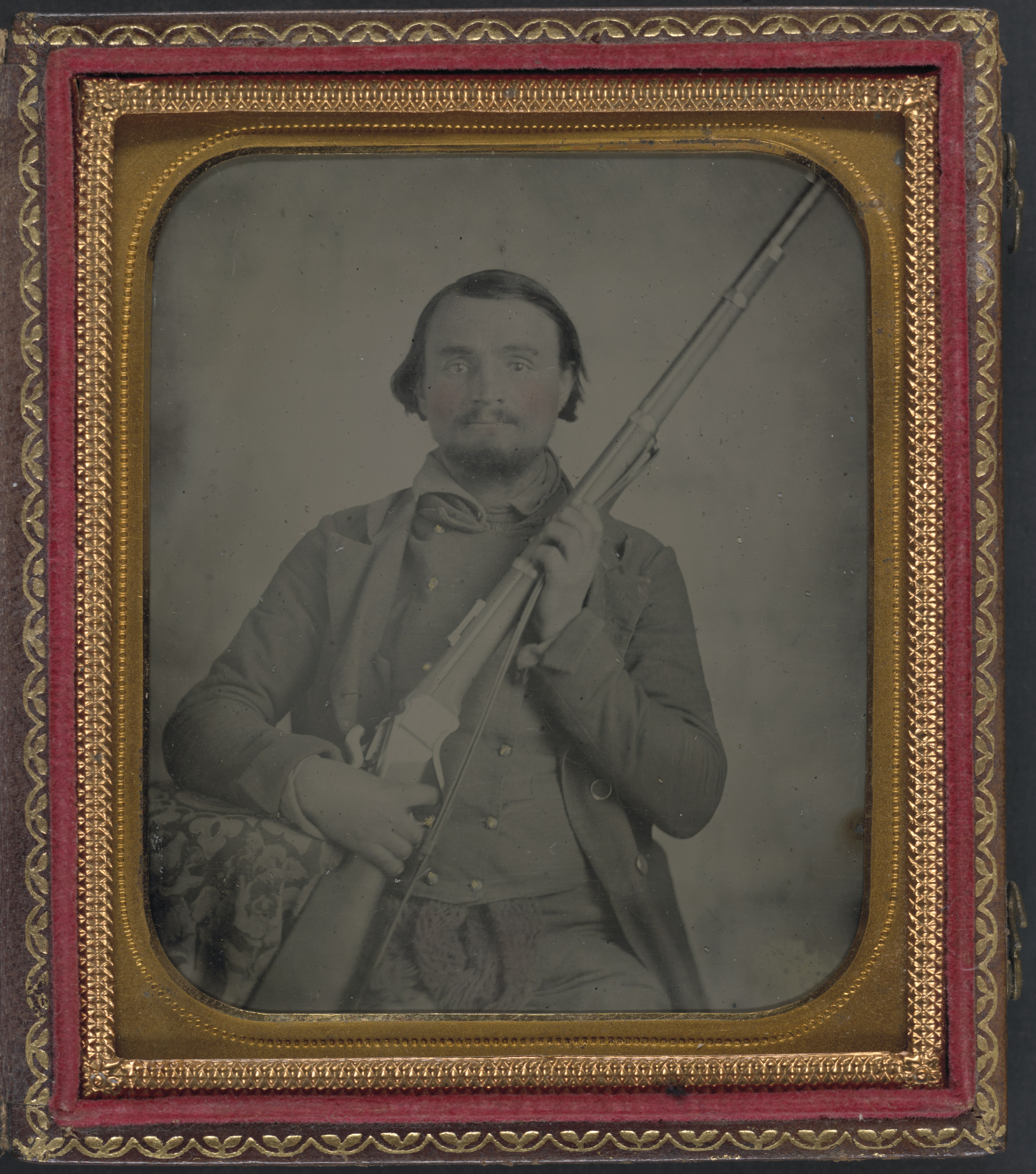
  Third Lieutenant John Alphonso Beall of Company D, 14th Texas Cavalry Regiment
- 15th Texas Cavalry Regiment (Sweet's Regiment; 2nd Regiment, Johnson's Brigade; 1st Infantry, Consolidated)
- 16th Texas Cavalry Regiment (Fitzhugh's Regiment; 3rd Regiment, Johnson's Brigade)

- Company G

- 17th Texas Cavalry Regiment (Moore's Regiment; 1st Infantry, Consolidated)

- Company K (Clough Rangers)

- 17th (Consolidated) Dismounted Cavalry
- 18th Texas Cavalry Regiment (Darnell's Regiment; 1st Infantry, Consolidated)
- 19th Texas Cavalry Regiment (Burford's Regiment)

- Company F
- Company G
- Company I

- 20th Texas Cavalry Regiment (Bass' Regiment)

- Company B (Caldwell Co. Rangers)
- Company G
- Company H

- 21st Texas Cavalry Regiment (Carter's 1st Texas Lancers; 1st Regiment, Carter's Brigade)
- 22nd Texas Cavalry Regiment (1st Indian-Texas Cavalry)

- Company D (Stephens Cavalry)

- 23rd Texas Cavalry Regiment (Gould's Regiment; 27th Cavalry)
- 24th Texas Cavalry Regiment (Wilkes's 2nd Lancers; 2nd Regiment, Carter's Brigade; 1st Infantry, Consolidated)

- Company B (Caldwell Co. Rangers)

- 25th Texas Cavalry Regiment (Gillespie's 3rd Lancers; 3d Regiment, Carter's Brigade; 1st Infantry, Consolidated)
- 26th Texas Cavalry Regiment (Davis's Cavalry; Debray's Mounted Battalion)
  Flag of the 26th Texas Cavalry

- Company A (Moore's Rebels)
- Company B (Caldwell Co. Rangers)
- Company C (Moore's Rangers)
- Company E (Hebert Rangers)
- Company G (Galveston Videttes)
- Company H (Debray's Rangers)

- 27th Texas Cavalry Regiment (4th Battalion; Whitfield's Legion; 1st Legion)

- Company A (Texas Fencibles; Titus Invincibles)
- Company B Arkansas Company, (Transferred to Stirman's Sharpshooter Regiment July 23 1862, Permanent)
- Company C (J.P. Henderson Rangers)
- Company D (Whitfield Rifles)
- Company E (Lone Star Rangers)
- Company F
- Company G
- Company H
- Company I (Titus Rangers)
- Company K
- Company M
- Company N

- 28th Texas Cavalry Regiment (Randal's 1st Lancers)

- Company L

- 29th Texas Cavalry Regiment (De Morse's Regiment)
- 30th Texas Cavalry Regiment (Gurley's Regiment)
- 31st Texas Cavalry Regiment (Hawpe's Regiment; Guess's Cavalry Battalion)
- 32nd Texas Cavalry Regiment (Andrews's 15th Cavalry; Crump's Battalion; Mounted Volunteers)

- Company G (Lamar Cavalry)
- Company K

- 33rd Texas Cavalry Regiment (Duff's Regiment)
- 34th Texas Cavalry Regiment (Alexander's Regiment)
- 35th (Brown's) Texas Cavalry Regiment (Rountree's Cavalry Battalion; Brown's Regiment)

- Company A (Columbia Blues)
- Company G (Brazoria Rangers)
- Hargrove's Company (Hood's Guerillas)

- 35th (Likens') Texas Cavalry Regiment (Likens' and Burns' Cavalry Battalions and three companies transferred from Terrell's Regiment; Likens's Regiment)
- 36th Texas Cavalry Regiment (Woods's 32nd Cavalry)
- 37th Texas Cavalry Regiment (Terrell's Cavalry Battalion; Terrell's 34th Cavalry)

- Company A

- 46th Texas Cavalry Regiment

The Frontier Regiment (McCord's) was transferred to Confederate service on March 1, 1864 under this designation (see below).

==== Battalions ====
- 1st Cavalry Battalion (Crump's, see 32nd Texas Cavalry)
- 3rd Cavalry Battalion (Yager's Mounted Rifles; 1st Cavalry)
- 4th Cavalry Battalion (Whitfield's, see 27th Texas Cavalry)
- 6th Cavalry Battalion (Gould's Battalion)
- 7th Cavalry Battalion (26th Cavalry)
- 8th Cavalry Battalion (Taylor's Mounted Rifles; 1st Cavalry)

Formed in mid-April 1862, from men mustered out of 1st (McCulloch's) Mounted Riflemen; later part of the 1st Cavalry regiment.

- 12th Cavalry Battalion (35th Cavalry)
- 13th Cavalry Battalion
- 14th Cavalry Battalion (33rd Cavalry)
- Border's Cavalry Regiment of Cadets
- Morgan's Texas Cavalry Battalion (C. L. Morgan's Battalion)

==== Partisan Rangers ====
- 1st Partisan Rangers

Organized in June 1862 by Walter P. Lane; disbanded after the surrender of the Trans-Mississippi Department on May 26, 1865.

- 2nd Partisan Rangers

Began to be organized in October 1862, by B. Warren Stone, Jr.; operational in March 1863. Disbanded after the surrender of the Trans-Mississippi Department on May 26, 1865.

- Company K

- 5th Cavalry (Partisan Rangers)

Organized February 6, 1863, through the merger of 10th Cavalry Battalion (see below) with two independent companies and Randolph's First Battalion Texas Partisan Rangers. Disbanded on May 15, 1865.

- 30th Cavalry (Gurley's 1st Partisan Rangers)

- Company K (Dixie Boys)

- 33rd Cavalry (Benavides' Cavalry Regiment(Duff's Partisan Rangers, 14th Cavalry Battalion)
- 34th Cavalry (Alexander's 2nd Partisan Rangers)
- 9th Cavalry Battalion (Partisan Rangers, 5th Partisan Rangers)
- 10th Cavalry Battalion (5th Partisan Rangers)

Organized October 23, 1862 by Leonidas M. Martin to act as "Police Guards" in Cooke County. Merged with other units to form the Fifth Texas Partisan Rangers (see above), February 6, 1863.

=== Artillery ===
==== Light Artillery ====
- 4th (Shea's) Battalion, Artillery
- 1st Texas Field Battery (Edgar's Company, Light Artillery)
- 2nd Texas Field Battery (McMahan's Company)
- 4th Texas Field Battery (Mechling's Company; Van Dorn Light Artillery)
- 5th Texas Field Battery (Creuzbauer's Company)
- 6th Texas Field Battery
- 7th Texas Field Battery (Moseley's Company, Light Artillery)
- 8th Texas Field Battery (Dege's Light Artillery Battalion)
- 9th Texas Field Battery (Daniel's Company; Lamar Artillery)
- 10th Texas Field Battery (Pratt's/Hynson's Company; Sewart Artillery)
- 11th Texas Field Battery (Howell's Company, Light Artillery)
- Val Verde Texas Battery (12th Texas Battery, Sayers/Nettles Company)
- 13th Texas Field Battery (Wilson's/Gonzales'/Hughes's Company, Light Artillery)
- 14th Texas Field Battery (Dashiell's Company)
- 15th Texas Field Battery (Nichols's Company)
- 16th Texas Field Battery (Gibson's Company)
- 17th Texas Field Battery (Krumbhaar's/Stafford's Company; Texas Guards Artillery)
- Douglas's Texas Battery (Good's Battery; Dallas Light Artillery)

==== Heavy Artillery ====
- 1st Heavy Artillery (Cook's Regiment)

- Company C (Houston Turner Rifles)
- Company F (Jeff Davis Guards; Houston's Rough & Ready Company)
- Company H (Catching's Company)

== State Troops ==
=== Infantry ===
- 1st State Troops
- 1st State Troops, Infantry (6 months)
- 2nd State Troops, Infantry (6 months)
- 3rd State Troops, Infantry (6 months)
- 4th Infantry, State Troops (6 months)
- 5th Infantry, State Troops (6 months)
- 1st Battalion, State Troops, Infantry
- 20th Battalion, State Troops
- 24th Battalion, Infantry, State Troops
- 30th State Troops (The Medina Guards)
- Arnold's Company, Infantry Riflemen, Militia
- Atkins's Company, State Troops (The Galveston Coast Guards)
- Edgar's Company, State Troops (Alamo City Guards)
- Gould's Company, State Troops (Clarksville Light Infantry)
- Hampton's Company, State Troops (Victoria Blues)
- Teel's Company, State Troops (6 months)

=== Cavalry ===
- 1st Cavalry, State Troops (6 months)
- 2nd Cavalry, State Troops (6 months)
- 3rd Cavalry, State Troops (6 months)
- 4th Cavalry, State Troops (6 months)
- 1st Battalion, Cavalry, State Troops (6 months)
- 2nd Battalion, Cavalry, State Troops (6 months)
- 3rd Battalion, Cavalry, State Troops (6 months)
- Doughty's Company, Cavalry, State Troops (Refugio Spies)
- Graham's Company, Mounted Coast Guards, State Troops
- Terry's Mounted Company (State Troops)

=== Artillery ===
- Good's Company, State Troops, Artillery (Dallas Light Artillery)

=== Frontier ===
- Frontier Organization, Texas State Troops

Organized March 1, 1864, as a replacement for the Frontier Regiment (McCord's) (see below), transferred to Confederate service. The Frontier Organization contained all men liable for military service living in the 59 frontier counties. They were formed into three districts of together 4,000 men (one-fourth of the men, on a rotation basis, in service at any one time). The organization was in operation several months after the end of the war.

== Misc ==
- Waul's Legion (Infantry, Cavalry, and Artillery)
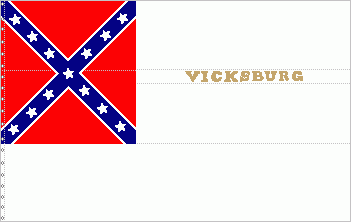
  Flag of Waul's Legion
- Granbury's Consolidated Brigade (1st Consolidated Regiment)
- 3rd (Kirby's) Battalion, Infantry and Cavalry (6 months)
- 6th and 15th (Consolidated) Volunteers, Cavalry and Infantry
- 11th (Spaight's) Battalion (Cavalry, Artillery, and Infantry)
- 13th Volunteers (Cavalry, Artillery, and Infantry)
- Bean's Battalion, Reserve Corps
- Brush Battalion
- Panna Maria Grays, Militia
- Greer's Rocket Battery
- Benton's Company, Volunteers
- Duke's Company, Volunteers (Jefferson Guards)
- Killough's Company, Home Guards (Wheelock Home Guards)
- McMinn's Company
- McNeel's Company, Local Defense Troops (McNeel Coast Guards)
- Merriman's Company, Local Defense Troops (Orange County Coast Guards)
- Nolan's Mounted Company (Local Defense)
- Pearson's Company, Partisan Rangers (Local Defense)
- Perry's Company, Local Defense Troops (Fort Bend Scouts)
- Rainey's Company, Volunteers (Anderson County Invincibles)
- Simms' Company, Home Guards
- Teague's Company, Volunteers (Southern Rights Guards)
- Thomas' Company, Partisan Rangers (4 months)
- Trevenio's Squad, Partisan Mounted Volunteers
- Brazoria County Minutemen
- Conscripts, Texas
- Lavaca County Minutemen
- Miscellaneous, Texas

=== Cavalry ===
- Arizona Brigade
  - 1st Regiment, Arizona Brigade (Hardeman`s, 31st Cavalry)
  - 2nd Regiment, Arizona Brigade (Baylor’s, Arizona Rangers)
  - 3rd Regiment, Arizona Brigade (Madison`s/Phillips')
  - 4th Regiment, Arizona Brigade (Baird's/Showalter's)
- Border's Battalion, Cavalry
- Frontier Battalion, Cavalry
- Gidding's Battalion, Cavalry
- Good's Battalion, Cavalry
- Mann's Battalion, Cavalry
- Ragsdale's Battalion, Cavalry
- Saufley's Scouting Battalion, Cavalry

A temporary field organization under William Saufley; formed in January 1864, for the defense of Galveston. Disbanded in March 1864; the companies returning to duty with their regiments.

- Wells' Battalion, Cavalry
- Border's Cavalry (Anderson's Regiment)
- Bourland's Cavalry (Bourlands Border Regiment)
- Chisum's Cavalry (Dismounted), (2d Partisan Rangers; Stone's Regiment)
- Mann's Cavalry (Bradford's Regiment)
- Martin's Cavalry (5th Partisan Rangers)
- Frontier Regiment (McCord's)

Mustered into service for three years in February 1863 as a replacement for the disbanded Frontier Regiment (Norris'). The new regiment was officially called the Mounted Regiment of Texas State Troops, later Mounted Regiment, Texas State Troops. The regiment was transferred to Confederate service on March 1, 1864 as the 46th Texas Cavalry (see above).

- Frontier Regiment (Norris')

Authorized by the Legislature on December 21, 1861 as a replacement for 1st (McCulloch's) Mounted Riflemen in frontier defense. Mustered into State service for one year in March and April 1862. Disbanded at the end of January 1863, by order of Governor Lubbock. It was replaced by a reorganized Frontier Regiment (McCord's).

- Morgan's Cavalry
- Waller's Cavalry
- Bone's Company, Cavalry
- San Elizario Spy Company (Coopwood's Cavalry)
- Crump's Cavalry (Lane's Cavalry, 1st Partisan Rangers)
- Durant's Company, Cavalry (Local Defense)
- Lilley's Company, Cavalry (Pardoned Deserters)
- McDowell's Company, Cavalry (Lockhart Volunteers)
- Ragsdale's Company, Cavalry (Red River Dragoons)
- Randolph's, W. H. Company, Cavalry
- Sutton's Company, Cavalry (Graham Rangers)
- Trevenio's, L. Company, Cavalry
- Upton's Company, Cavalry (Local Defense)
- Gano's Squadron, Cavalry
- Steele's Command, Cavalry
- Mounted Mountain Guards (Capt. R.T. Posey) (West Texas Defence Force, Frontier Brigade)

=== Infantry ===
- Chambers' Battalion, Reserve Corps, Infantry
- Griffin's Battalion, Infantry (Griffin's Regiment, Infantry; 21st Regiment or Battalion, Infantry)
- Houston Battalion, Infantry (Detailed Men)
- Cameron's, Watts Company, Infantry
- Carter's Company, Infantry (Austin City Light Infantry)
- Cotton's Company, Infantry (Sabine Volunteers)
- Cunningham's Company, Infantry (The Mustang Grays)
- Currie's Company, Infantry
- Maxey's Company, Light Infantry and Riflemen (Lamar Rifles, State Service)
- Rutherford's Company, Infantry (Unattached)
- Townsend's Company, Infantry (Robertson Five Shooters)
- Whaley's Company, Infantry
- Yarbrough's Company, Infantry (Smith County Light Infantry)
- Timmons' Infantry

=== Artillery ===
- Dege's Battalion, Light Artillery
- Douglas's Company, Artillery
- Hughes's Company, Light Artillery
- Jones's Company, Light Artillery
- (Lt.) van Buren's Company, Light Artillery

== See also ==
- Texas in the American Civil War
- List of Texas Civil War Union units
- Lists of American Civil War Regiments by State
