= 30th Texas Cavalry Regiment =

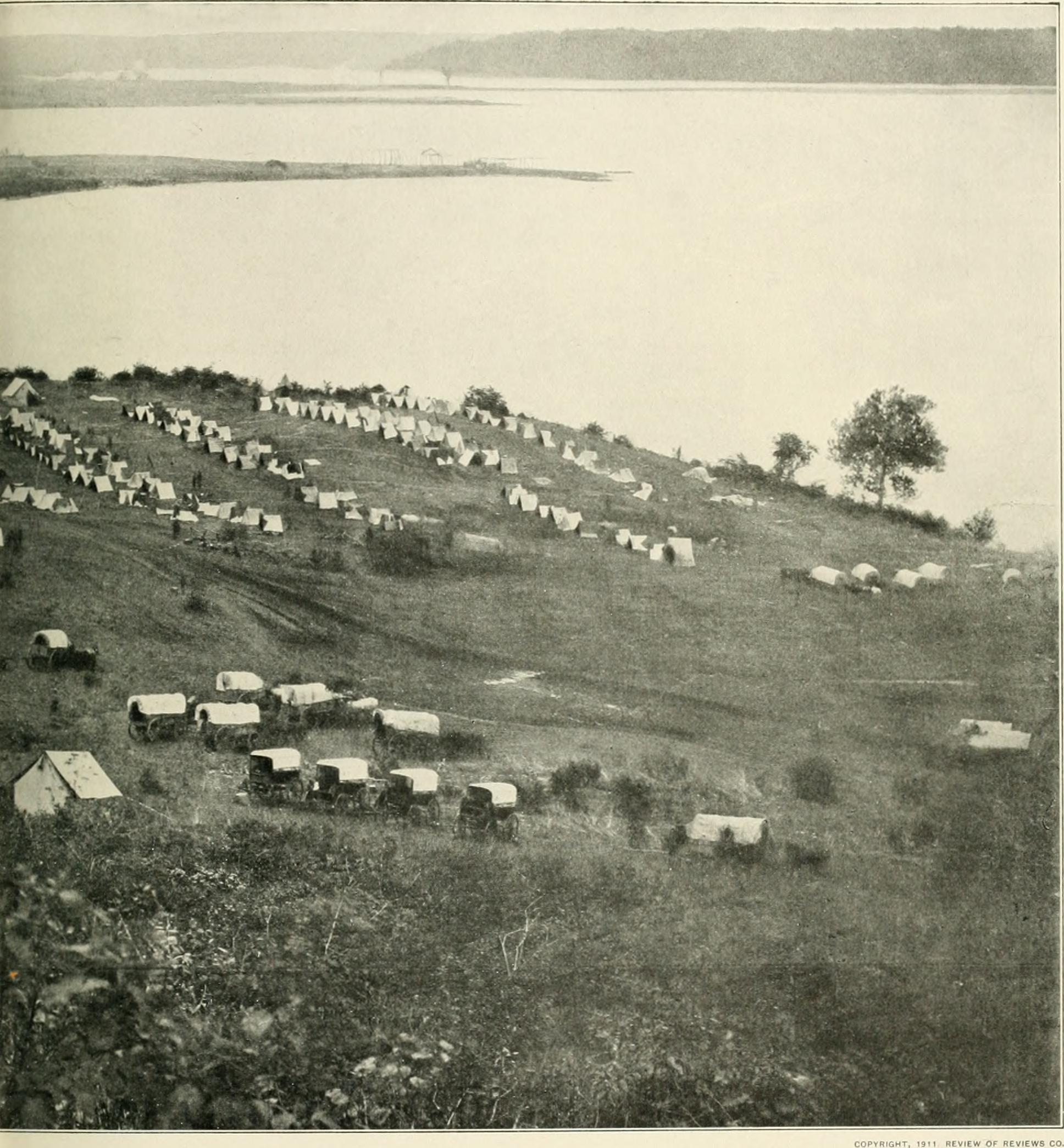
- The regiment helped destroy a Federal wagon train at Cabin Creek. A group of wagons are in the foreground in this Civil War photo of a Union camp.
- Active: 18 August 1862 – May 1865
- Country: Confederate States of America
- Allegiance: Confederate States of America, Texas
- Branch: Confederate States Army
- Type: Cavalry
- Size: Regiment
- Nickname: 1st Texas Partisan Rangers
- Engagements: American Civil War; Roseville Raid (1864); Second Battle of Cabin Creek (1864)

Commanders
- Notable commanders: Edward J. Gurley

The 30th Texas Cavalry Regiment was a unit of mounted volunteers from Texas that fought in the Confederate States Army during the American Civil War. Attorney Edward J. Gurley organized the regiment at Waco, Texas, in August 1862 and elected its colonel. Most of the recruits came from Waco and environs. Many men enlisted to escape the shame of being swept up by the Confederate Conscription Act, while others preferred to join the cavalry rather than serve in the infantry. For a year, the regiment remained within the state, defending the Texas Gulf Coast. In August 1863, the unit was reassigned to Smith P. Bankhead's cavalry brigade and ordered to march to Indian Territory. Since the brigade suffered from bad morale and desertions, in October 1863 Richard Montgomery Gano was appointed the new brigade commander. In March 1864, the bulk of the regiment raided Roseville, Arkansas, where Federal supplies were destroyed. After returning to Indian Territory, the regiment helped destroy a Union wagon train at Cabin Creek. In March 1865, the unit successfully resisted an order to dismount and serve as infantry. In May 1865, the regiment disbanded at Wallace Prairie near Austin, Texas.

== See also ==
- List of Texas Civil War Confederate units
