= List of Texas Civil War Union units =

This is a list of Texas Union Army units that served in the American Civil War. The Confederate civil war units are listed separately. Although Texas seceded in 1861, there was a pro-Union minority within the state that organized several units for the Union Army. It is estimated that some 2,000 Texans served the Union during the war.

- 1st Texas Cavalry Regiment
- 2nd Texas Cavalry Regiment (merged with 1st Texas Cavalry Regiment in 1864)
- 2nd Texas Cavalry Regiment (1865)
- Hamilton's Body Guard, Texas Cavalry
- Independent Partisan Rangers, Texas Cavalry

== See also ==
- Texas in the American Civil War
- List of American Civil War regiments by state
- Southern Unionists
