= George W. Saunders =

American cattleman (1854–1933)

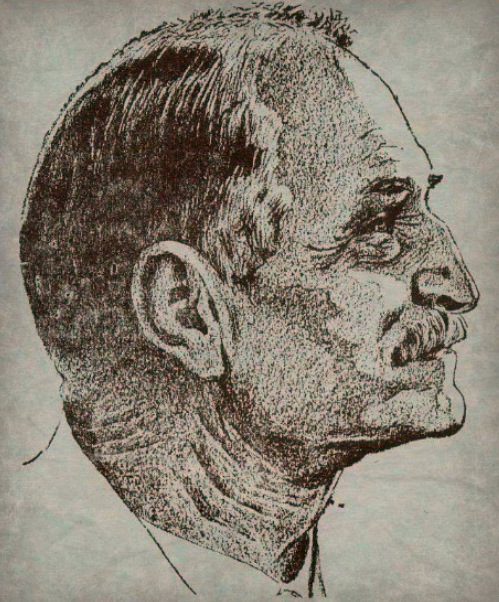
- Born: George Washington Saunders; February 12, 1854; Rancho, Texas, US
- Died: July 3, 1933 (aged 79); San Antonio, Texas, US
- Occupation: Cattleman

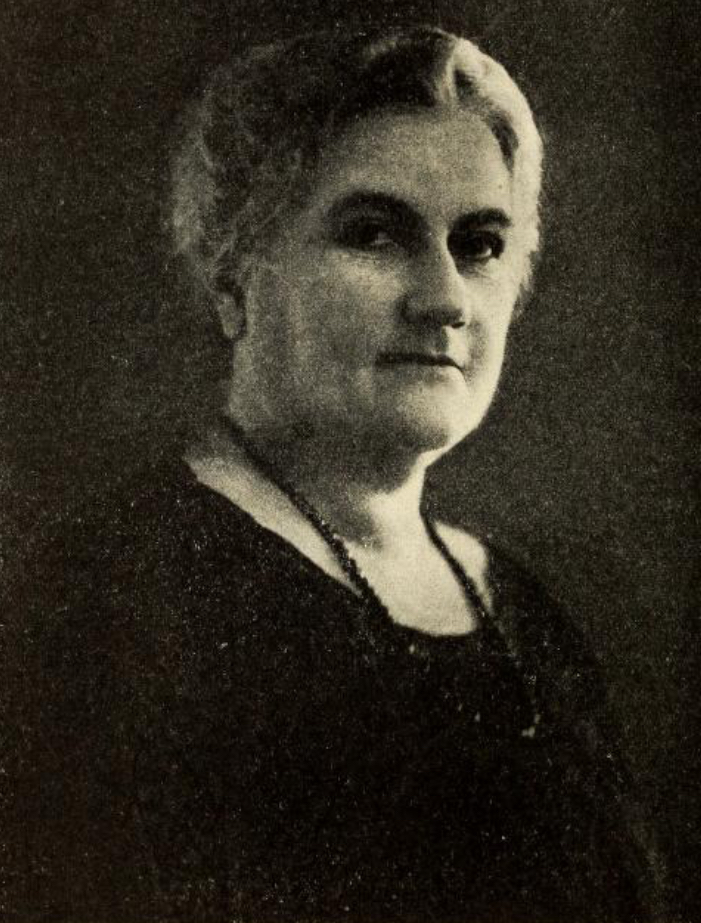
Rachel Reeves—Saunders' wife—in a 1925 publication

George Washington Saunders (February 12, 1854 – July 3, 1933) was an American cattleman.

== Biography ==
Saunders was born on February 12, 1854, in Rancho, Texas, the sixth of eleven children. His parents Thomas and Elizabeth Emily Bailey (née Harper) had moved to Texas from Fayetteville, North Carolina, in 1850. He grew up on a ranch, and was gifted ten cattle for his tenth birthday. He attended Concrete College.

Saunders first drove cattle to Kansas in 1871, later droving to the Texas Gulf Coast, New Orleans and Mexico. On July 15, 1874, he married Rachel Reeves. They had two daughters and a son who died during infancy. By 1880, they moved to San Antonio for Rachel's medical care, where she later died on February 8, 1883. During that time, Saunders ran a hack business. After running a drove of horses north, he returned to San Antonio in 1886, to work with livestock as an apprentice to Dillard Rucker Fant. On January 1, 1889, he married Ida Friedrich, having one daughter. By 1910, he started his own livestock company, which made him $5,000,000 (~33,000,000 in 2025) per year. The company dissolved in 1958. He also owned four ranches and a 700-acre farm.

Saunders was a founding member of the Trail Drivers Association, serving from February 15, 1915, to 1917, when he was elected president. He was also a member of the Texas and Southwestern Cattle Raisers Association. He died on July 3, 1933, aged 79, in San Antonio, following a myocardial infarction.
