= 1st Texas Cavalry Regiment (Arizona Brigade) =

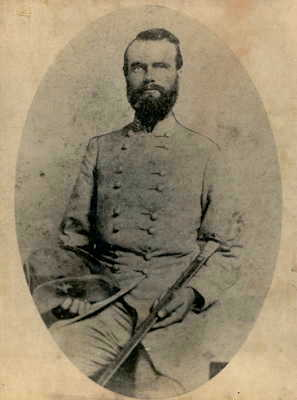
- The regiment served in Richard M. Gano's brigade.
- Active: 29 May 1862 – 26 May 1865
- Country: Confederate States of America
- Allegiance: Confederate States of America, Texas
- Branch: Confederate States Army
- Type: Cavalry
- Size: Regiment
- Engagements: American Civil War; Battle of Poison Spring (1864); Battle of Cabin Creek (1864)

Commanders
- Notable commanders: Philemon T. Herbert; Peter Hardeman; William Polk Hardeman

The 1st Texas Cavalry Regiment (Arizona Brigade) was a unit of mounted volunteers from Texas that served in the Confederate States Army during the American Civil War. In fall 1861, John R. Baylor first conceived the idea of forming a brigade of cavalry to conquer the southwestern territories for the Confederacy. Baylor recruited a four-company battalion of cavalry which was placed under the command of Philemon T. Herbert.

In May 1862, the Confederate States Army empowered Baylor to organize five battalions of Partisan Rangers, each consisting of each companies. Since its aim was to recapture the territories lost during the New Mexico campaign, the unite become known as theArizona Brigade.

Henry Hopkins Sibley dismissed Baylor and appointed Peter Hardeman as the battalion's commander. It camped at Victoria, Texas, from summer 1862 to April 1863, part of the time under the temporary leadership of William Polk Hardeman. Eventually expanded to a full regiment, the unit joined Richard Montgomery Gano's cavalry brigade in the Indian Territory. In 1864, it fought at Poison Spring and Cabin Creek.

Subsequently, the regiment was ordered to march to Hempstead, Texas, where it was dismounted. Its numbers eventually dwindled to just 175 men. On May 15, 1865, the unit disbanded while camped near Richmond, Texas.

== See also ==
- List of Texas Civil War Confederate units
- Texas in the Civil War
