= 35th (Brown's) Texas Cavalry Regiment =

- Active: October 1863 – 2 June 1865
- Country: Confederate States of America
- Allegiance: Confederate States of America, Texas
- Branch: Confederate States Army
- Type: Cavalry
- Size: Regiment (927 men, Oct. 1863)
- Engagements: American Civil War; Action at Fort Esperanza (1863)

Commanders
- Notable commanders: Reuben R. Brown

The 35th (Brown's) Texas Cavalry Regiment was a unit of mounted volunteers from Texas that fought in the Confederate States Army during the American Civil War. The regiment was created by merging the 12th Texas Cavalry Battalion and Rountree's Texas Cavalry Battalion in October 1863. The new unit's commander was Reuben R. Brown. Its first assignment was to threaten Fort Esperanza, which Federal troops had recently captured. An attack on the fort failed at the end of December 1863. From February 1864 until the end of the war, the regiment patrolled the Texas Gulf Coast. The unit officially surrendered on 2 June 1865.

== See also ==
- List of Texas Civil War Confederate units
- Texas in the American Civil War
