= Trans-Mississippi =

Former region of the United States

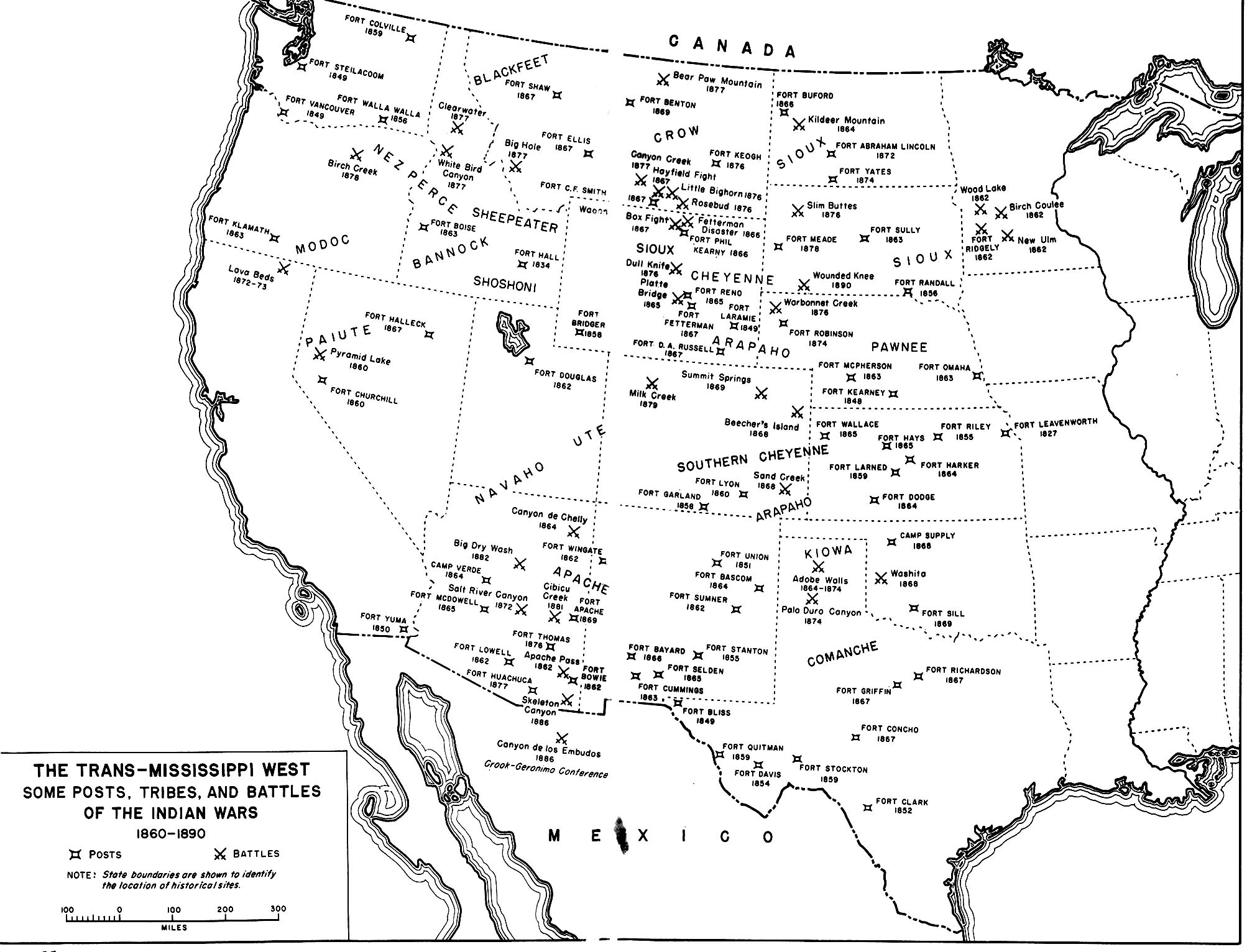
Indian battles in the Trans Mississippi West

Trans-Mississippi was a common name of the geographic area west of the Mississippi River during the 19th century. The term "Trans-Mississippi" was historically used to refer to any land "across the Mississippi" (or the entire western two-thirds of the United States), including Nebraska, Iowa, North Dakota, South Dakota, Kansas, Minnesota, Arkansas, Louisiana, Missouri, Texas, New Mexico, Arizona, California, Nevada, Utah, Colorado, Montana, Wyoming, Idaho, Washington and Oregon. It also included Indian Territory (now Oklahoma), Alaska, Hawaii, and other U.S. territories.

== History ==
The postage stamps of the Trans-Mississippi Exposition Issue are considered some of the most beautiful stamps ever issued by the United States, and a complete set of the "Trans-Miss" has been highly prized since its 1898 issue. Demonstrating the ongoing significance of the event and its focus, on its 100th anniversary in 1998, a set of stamps using designs derived from the original issue was issued to commemorate its 100th anniversary. In 1898, a Trans-Mississippi Exposition was held in Omaha, Nebraska.
