= Battle of Calcasieu Pass =

Battle of the American Civil War

- Part of the Trans-Mississippi Theater of the American Civil War
Date	May 6, 1864
Location	Cameron, Louisiana 29°47′43.4184″N 93°18′58.13″W
Result	Confederate victory

Belligerents
United States (Union)	(Confederate States of America) CSA (Confederacy)

Commanders and leaders
Lt. Benjamin Loring; Lt. C. W. Lamson	Col. W. H. Griffin
- Location of the battle within Louisiana

The Battle of Calcasieu Pass was a minor skirmish fought on May 6, 1864, at the mouth of the Calcasieu River in southwestern Louisiana, during the American Civil War. The engagement was between the forces of Confederate Col. W. H. Griffin and Union Lieutenants Benjamin Loring and C. W. Lamson. In the battle, Confederates fought and captured two Union gunboats (Wave and Granite City) and later converted them into blockade runners.

The participants of the battle were Lt. Benjamin Loring and Lt. C. W. Lamson on the Union’s side, and Col. W. H. Griffin on the Confederate side.

The union brought along two naval vessels, the U.S.S. Wave and the U.S.S. Granite City. The U.S.S. Wave did not prove too effective during the battle and was captured early on, it was soon turned into a Confederate cargo ship. The U.S.S. Granite City was originally a confederate blockade vessel, but was captured in 1863 by the U.S.S. Tioga (Union). The U.S.S. Granite City was now back in the hands of the Confederates.

Captain Joseph A. Brickhouse, a Confederate veteran, said, “We fought in the open prairie, bringing on the attack with four small pieces of artillery and less than 300 infantry, poorly armed, attacking in the open prairie two such boats as the Granite City and Wave—Union gunboats—and capturing them after an action of less than two hours and 40 minutes duration.” He described his own Confederate forces as unprepared, and he stated that they still had an easy battle that was short in duration.

The Confederate forces in this battle consisted of five battalions. The first was Creuzbauer's Battery, 5th Texas Artillery. Every soldier in this battalion was born in Germany, and they all migrated to the U.S. during the Civil War. The second battalion, named Griffin’s Battalion, was led by Col. William Henry Griffin. The third battalion was Spaight’s Battalion, led by Lt. Col. Ashley W. Spaight. The last one was Daly’s Battalion, the only cavalry unit in the battle.

The U.S.S. Wave and the U.S.S. Granite City received orders to proceed to Calcasieu Pass. On arrival, they immediately bombed an abandoned Confederate fort at the mouth of the river. The gunboats were sent with money to purchase cattle from local southern farmers. The U.S.S. Granite City ended up stealing cattle and horses from multiple farms, which prompted a Confederate attack. The local Confederate forces arrived quietly and prepared for a night attack on the Union forces. When the Union went to sleep, they let less-experienced soldiers man the guns.

The Confederates seized the opportunity and moved their cannons closer. The cannons lined up 1,000 yards from the gunboats, while the cavalry and foot-soldiers advanced. Numerous cannon shells penetrated the gunboats' hulls. While the cavalry and foot-soldiers moved in, the artillery advanced as well, and finished off the vessels.

On May 8, Ella Morse, a Union Supply ship did not know of the Union casualties. Then brought moved up all the way to the other ships with supplies. When she noticed that confederates were manning the guns, it was too late. They gunned the ship down. The Union Forces suffered many casualties. They lost the Ella Morse, the U.S.S. Granite City, the U.S.S. Wave, and the U.S.S. New London. On their side, the Confederates lost only a few men from each battalion.
