= 1st Texas Cavalry Regiment (Union) =

- Active: November 6, 1862 – November 4, 1865
- Country: United States of America
- Allegiance: Texas
- Branch: Union Army
- Type: Regiment
- Role: Cavalry
- Size: 8 companies (initially); 12 companies
- Part of: Department of the Gulf
- Organized at New Orleans: New Orleans, Louisiana
- Engagements: Second Bayou Teche Campaign; Battle of Irish Bend; Battle of Fort Bisland; Army of the Gulf South Texas Expedition; Battle of Brownsville; Battle of Laredo

Commanders
- Notable commanders: Col. Edmund J. Davis; Col. John L. Haynes

The 1st Texas Cavalry Regiment was a cavalry regiment from Texas that served in the Union Army during the American Civil War. This regiment, composed of eight companies, was organized at New Orleans, Louisiana from November 6, 1862, to February 26, 1864, to serve three years. (Note: The core of the regiment were survivors of the Nueces Massacre and other refugees from the German immigrant and Tejano population of the Texas Hill Country. For more information see the Nueces massacre.) It served in the Department of the Gulf and in Texas. It was increased to twelve companies on September 10, 1864, by the consolidation of the 2nd Texas Cavalry Regiment. Afterwards, it continued to serve until it was mustered out of service November 4, 1865, in accordance with orders from the War Department.

== Affiliations, battle honors, detailed service, and casualties ==
=== Organizational affiliation ===
Attached to:

- Attached as an independent command, Department of the Gulf, to January 1863
- Defenses of New Orleans to May, 1863
- Cavalry, XIX Corps, Army of the Gulf, to July, 1863
- Defenses of New Orleans to October 1863
- Unattached Cavalry, XIII Corps, Army of the Gulf, to June, 1864
- Cavalry Brigade, United States Forces, Texas, to July 1864
- District of Morganza, LA, Department of the Gulf, to August 1864
- Cavalry Brigade, XIX Corps, Army of the Gulf, to November 1864
- 2nd Separate Cavalry Brigade, XIX Corps, Army of the Gulf, to December 1864
- Separate Cavalry Brigade, Reserve Corps, Department of the Gulf, to February 1865
- Cavalry Brigade, District of Baton Rouge, to July 1865
- Department of Texas to November. 1865

=== List of battles ===
The official list of battles in which the regiment bore a part:

- Second Bayou Teche Campaign
- Army of the Gulf South Texas Expedition
  - Battle of Brownsville
  - Battle of Laredo

=== Detailed service ===
Detailed service is as follows:

==== 1862 ====
- Duty in the Defences of New Orleans, La., till September, 1863

==== 1863 ====
- Sabine Pass Expedition September 4–11
- Western Louisiana ("Teche") Campaign October 3–17
- Nelson's Bridge, near New Iberia, October 4
- Vermillion Bayou October 9–10
- Carrion Crow Bayou October 14–15
- Ordered to New Orleans, La., October 17
- Expedition to the Rio Grande, Texas, October 23-December 2 (Note: On this expedition, they fought the 3rd Texas Cavalry which was commanded by Col. Duff who had commanded the unit that committed the Nueces Massacre.)
- Occupation of Brazos Santiago November 2, and of Brownsville November 6
- Duty at Brownsville and on line of the Rio Grande till July, 1864

==== 1864 ====
- Rancho las Rinas June 26, 1864 (Cos. "A" and "C")
- Ordered to New Orleans July, thence to Morganza, LA August 6
- Duty Morganza till November. (A Detachment remained in Texas at Brownsville till January, 1865 and participated in skirmish at Palmetto Ranch September 6, 1864)
- Operations about Morganza September 16–25, 1864
- Williamsport September 16
- Atchafalaya River September 17
- Bayou Alabama and Morgan's Ferry September 20
- Ordered to Baton Rouge November 19
- Davidson's Expedition against Mobile & Ohio Railroad November 27-December 13
- Ordered to Lakeport December 17
- United States Forces at mouth of White River and at Baton Rouge, till May, 1865

==== 1865 ====
- Expedition to Clinton and the Comite River March 30-April 2, 1865
- Ordered to Vidalia, District of Natchez, MS, May 23, 1865
- Duty Natchez till June 29
- Ordered to Military District of the Southwest and duty in Texas till November
- Mustered out November 4, 1865.

== Commanders ==
- Col. Edmund J. Davis (promoted to Brigadier General)
- Col. John L. Haynes

== See also ==
- List of Texas Civil War Union units
- Nueces Massacre, one of the events leading to enlistment in the Regiment
