= 15th Texas Infantry Regiment =

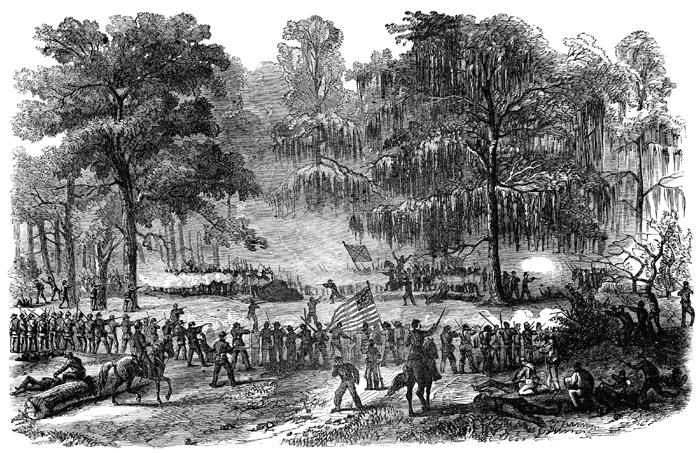
- The regiment fought at the Battle of Bayou Bourbeux.
- Active: Early 1862 – 26 May 1865
- Country: Confederate States of America
- Allegiance: Confederate States of America, Texas
- Branch: Confederate States Army
- Type: Infantry
- Size: Regiment
- Engagements: American Civil War; Battle of Stirling's Plantation (1863); Battle of Bayou Bourbeux (1863); Battle of Mansfield (1864); Battle of Pleasant Hill (1864); Battle of Yellow Bayou (1864)

Commanders
- Notable commanders: Joseph Warren Speight

The 15th Texas Infantry Regiment was a unit of volunteers recruited in Texas that fought in the Confederate States Army during the American Civil War. The regiment organized in early 1862 and throughout the war served west of the Mississippi River in the Trans-Mississippi Department. In October 1863, the unit was assigned to a brigade led by the French aristocrat Prince Camille de Polignac. The 15th Texas Infantry fought at Stirling's Plantation and Bayou Bourbeux in 1863 and Mansfield, Pleasant Hill, and Yellow Bayou in 1864. The regiment disbanded in May 1865, though the formal surrender date was 26 May 1865.
