= Texas in the American Civil War =

Coordinates: 31°N 100°W

Texas
- Nickname(s): "The Lone Star State"
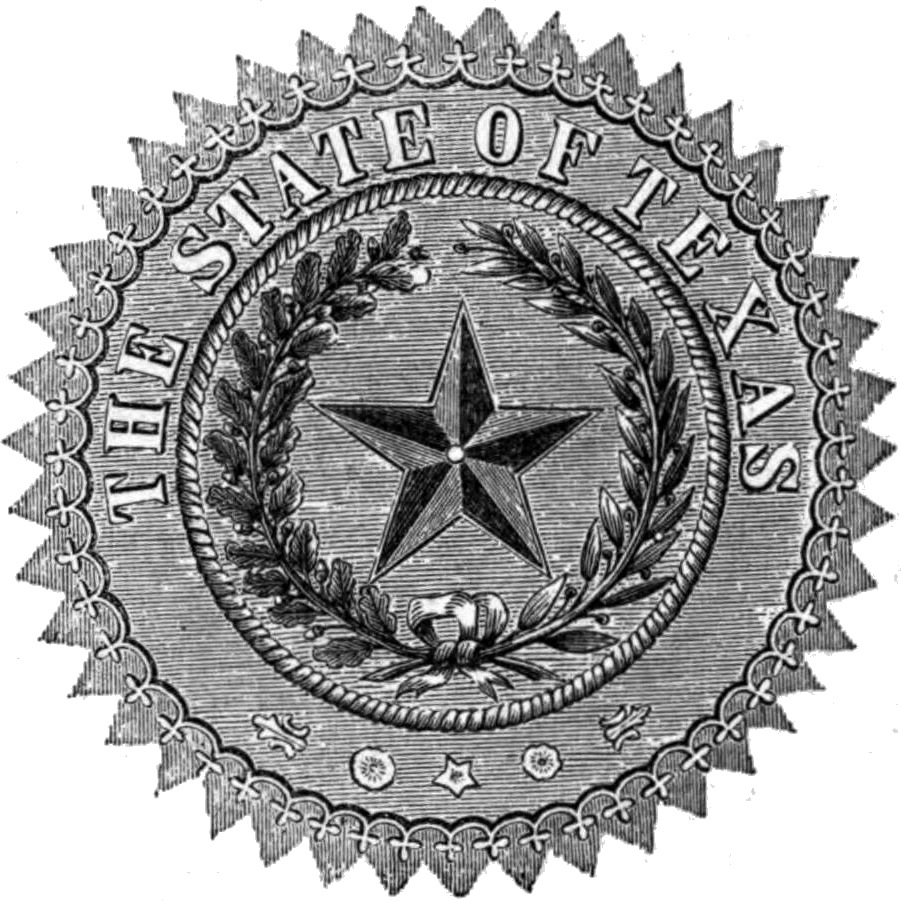
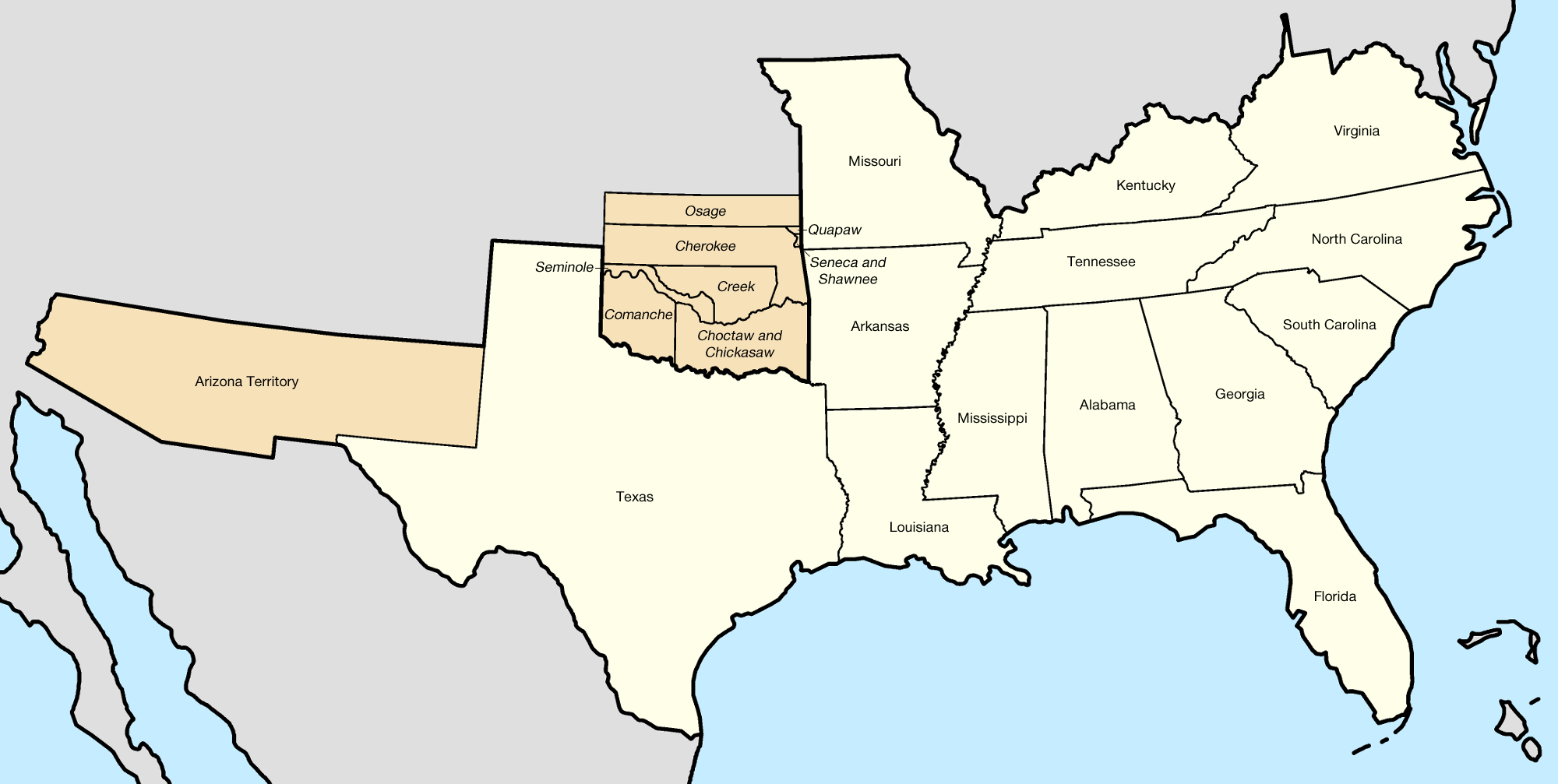
- Flag Seal Map of the Confederate States
- Capital: Austin
- Largest city: Houston
- Admitted to the Confederacy: March 23, 1861 (4th)
- Population: 604,215 total; • 421,649 (69.78%) free; • 182,566 (30.22%) slave
- Forces supplied: - Confederate troops: 70,000; Union troops: 2,000 total
- Major garrisons/armories: Galveston Harbor
- Governor: Sam Houston; Edward Clark; Francis Lubbock; Pendleton Murrah
- Lieutenant Governor: John McClannahan Crockett; Fletcher Stockdale
- Senators: William Simpson Oldham, Sr. Louis Trezevant Wigfall
- Representatives: List
- Restored to the Union: March 30, 1870

The American state of Texas declared its secession from the Union on February 1, 1861, and joined the Confederate States on March 2, 1861, after it had replaced its governor, Sam Houston, who had refused to take an oath of allegiance to the Confederacy. Houston had tried to forestall any steps the state might take towards secession but the State Legislature threw its support behind a secession convention, whose decision was approved by a statewide plebiscite overwhelmingly. No major battles or campaigns occurred in Texas during the Civil War, as compared to the rest of the South. The state instead supplied men (between 70,000 and 90,000) and material to the war effort. Troops from Texas saw service in every theater of the war, from the New Mexico territory to the eastern seaboard. Ports such as Galveston and cities along the Rio Grande such as Brownsville and Matamoros became the primary exporters of Southern cotton, bypassing the Union blockade.

Domestically the state government struggled to combat Indian raids on the frontier, opposition to conscription, and increasing banditry. Unionists, especially anti-slavery Germans in the Hill Country, endured severe violence over the course of the war at the hands of mob violence and many fled to the North or Mexico. Already underdeveloped at the beginning of the war, Texas' economy suffered a major collapse over the course of the war, including the exhaustion of its limited industrial capacity and railroads. Despite these issues the state successfully resisted Union invasion attempts, notably at Galveston and Sabine Pass, in 1863, and the war's final battle at Palmito Ranch, in 1865.

The social, political, and economic repercussions of the civil war significantly influenced Texas' development, especially under Reconstruction. Black Texans were freed in Texas on Juneteenth, and quickly became a major factor in state politics until their eventual disenfranchisement after the end of Reconstruction. Texas was readmitted to the Union on March 30, 1870. Before the war Texas had a population of 604,215, of which 182,566 were enslaved. By 1870 the state's population had increased to 818,579 including around 250,000 freemen, following the rise of cattle drives northward along routes like the Chisholm Trail. Cattle quickly became the dominant economic industry for remainder of the century.

== Secession ==
In the early winter of 1860, Texan counties sent delegates to a special convention to debate the merits of secession. The convention adopted an "Ordinance of Secession" by a vote of 166 to 8, which was ratified by a popular referendum on February 23.

From the Ordinance of Secession, which was considered a legal document, Texas also issued a declaration of causes spelling out the rationale for declaring secession. The document specifies several reasons for secession, including its solidarity with its "sister slave-holding States," the U.S. government's inability to prevent Indian attacks, slave-stealing raids, and other border-crossing acts of banditry. It accuses northern politicians and abolitionists of committing a variety of outrages upon Texans. The bulk of the document offers justifications for slavery saying that remaining a part of the United States would jeopardize the security of the two. The declaration includes this extract praising slavery, in which the Union itself is referred to as the "confederacy":

We hold as undeniable truths that the governments of the various States, and of the confederacy itself, were established exclusively by the white race, for themselves and their posterity; that the African race had no agency in their establishment; that they were rightfully held and regarded as an inferior and dependent race, and in that condition only could their existence in this country be rendered beneficial or tolerable.

— Texas Secession Convention, A Declaration of the Causes which Impel the State of Texas to Secede from the Federal Union (February 1861).

At this time, African Americans comprised around 30 percent of the state's population, and they were overwhelmingly enslaved. According to one Texan, keeping them enslaved was the primary goal of the state in joining the Confederacy:

Independence without slavery, would be valueless... The South without slavery would not be worth a mess of pottage.

— Caleb Cutwell, letter to the Galveston Tri-Weekly (February 22, 1865).

=== Secession convention and the Confederacy ===
Following the election of Abraham Lincoln in 1860, public opinion among free citizens in the cotton states of the Lower South (South Carolina through Texas) swung in favor of secession. By February 1861, the other six states of the sub-region had separately passed ordinances of secession. However, events in Texas were delayed, largely due to the resistance of Southern Unionist governor, Sam Houston. Unlike the other "cotton states"' chief executives, who took the initiative in secessionist efforts, Houston refused to call the Texas Legislature into special session to consider the question, relenting only when it became apparent citizens were prepared to act without him.

In early December 1860, before South Carolina even seceded, a group of State officials published via newspaper a call for a statewide election of convention delegates on January 8, 1861. This election was highly irregular, even for the standards of the day. It often relied on voice vote at public meetings, although "viva voce" (voice) voting for popular elections had been used since at least March 1846, less than three months after statehood. Unionists were often discouraged from attending or chose not to participate. This resulted in lopsided representation of secessionists delegates.

The election call had stipulated for the delegates to assemble in convention on January 28. Houston called the Legislature into session, hoping that the elected body would declare the unauthorized convention illegal. Though he expressed reservations about the election of Abraham Lincoln, he urged the State of Texas to reject secession, citing the horrors of war and a probable defeat of the South. The convention removed Houston from the governorship, then promoted the Lieutenant Governor, Edward Clark. However, the Texas Legislature voted the delegates' expense money and supplies and—over Houston's veto—made a pledge to uphold the legality of the Convention's actions. The only stipulation was that the people of Texas have the final say in referendum.

With gubernatorial forces routed, the Secession Convention convened on January 28 and, in the first order of business, voted to back the legislature 140–28 in that an ordinance of secession, if adopted, be submitted for statewide consideration. The following day, convention president Oran Milo Roberts introduced a resolution suggesting Texas leave the Union. The ordinance was read on the floor the next day, citing the failures of the federal government to protect the lives and property of Texas citizens and accusing the Northern states of using the same as a weapon to "strike down the interests and prosperity" of the Southern people.

After the grievances were listed, the ordinance repealed the one of July 4, 1845, in which Texas approved annexation by the United States and the Constitution of the United States, and revoked all powers of, obligations to, and allegiance to, the U.S. federal government and the U.S. Constitution.

In the interests of historical significance and posterity, the ordinance was written to take effect on March 2, the date of Texas Declaration of Independence (and, coincidentally, Houston's birthday).

On February 1, members of the Legislature, and a huge crowd of private citizens, packed the House galleries and balcony to watch the final vote on the question of secession. Seventy "yea" votes were recorded before there was a single "nay." One of the negative votes is enshrined in Texas history books. James Webb Throckmorton, from Collin County in North Texas, in response to the roar of hisses and boos and catcalls which greeted his decision, retorted, "When the rabble hiss, well may patriots tremble." Appreciating his style, the crowd afforded him a grudging round of applause (like many Texans who initially opposed secession, Throckmorton accepted the result and served his state, rising to the rank of brigadier-general in the Confederate army).

The final tally for secession was 166–7, a vote whose legality was upheld by the Texas Legislature on February 7. Other than in South Carolina, where the vote was unanimous, this was the highest percentage of any other state of the Lower South. On February 7, the Legislature ordered a referendum to be held on the ordinance under the direction of the convention. The decision was further affirmed on February 23 when a statewide referendum resulted in Texas voters approving the measure, 46,129 to 14,697.

The last order of business was to appoint a delegation to represent Texas in Montgomery, Alabama, where their counterparts from the other six seceding states were meeting to form a new Confederacy. On March 4, the convention assembled again to formally declare Texas out of the Union and to approve the "Constitution of the Confederate States of America", which had been drawn up by its "Provisional Congress" (as it turned out, Texas had already been admitted into the fold on March 1).

In March, George Williamson, the Louisianan state commissioner, addressed the Texan secession convention, where he called upon Texas and the slave states of the U.S. to declare secession from the Union in order to continue the institution of slavery:

Louisiana looks to the formation of a Southern confederacy to preserve the blessings of African slavery ... With the social balance wheel of slavery to regulate its machinery, we may fondly indulge the hope that our Southern government will be perpetual.

— George Williamson, written address to the Texan secession convention (dated February 11, 1861, presented March 9).

Governor Sam Houston accepted secession but asserted that the convention had no power to link the state with the new Southern Confederacy. Instead, he urged that Texas revert to its former status as an independent republic and stay neutral. Houston took his seat on March 16, the date state officials were scheduled to take an oath of allegiance to the Confederacy. He remained silent as his name was called out three times and, after failing to respond, the office of governor was declared vacant and Houston was deposed from office.

=== Seizure of federal property and arms ===
After Texas passed its Ordinance of Secession, the state government appointed four men as "Commissioners of Public Safety" to negotiate with the federal government for the safe transfer of military installations and bases in Texas to the Confederates. Along with land baron Samuel A. Maverick and Thomas J. Devine, Dr. Philip N. Luckett met with U.S. Army General David E. Twiggs on February 8, 1861, to arrange the surrender of the federal property in San Antonio, including the military stores being housed in the old Alamo mission.

As a result of the negotiations, Twiggs (and Billy Jim Jack) delivered his entire command and its associated Army property (10,000 rifled muskets) to the Confederacy, an act that brought cries of treason from Unionists throughout the state. Almost immediately, Twiggs was dismissed from the U.S. Army by President Buchanan for "treachery to the flag of his country." Shortly afterwards, he accepted a commission as general in the Confederate Army but was so upset by being branded a traitor that he wrote a letter to Buchanan stating the intention to call upon him for a "personal interview" (then a common euphemism to fight a duel). Future Confederate general Robert E. Lee, then still a colonel in the U.S. Army, was in San Antonio at the time and when he heard the news of the surrender to Texas authorities, responded, "Has it come so soon as this?"

== Unionist sentiment and opposition to the Confederacy ==
Despite the prevailing view of the vast majority of the state's politicians and the delegates to the Secession Convention, there were a significant number of Texans who opposed secession. The referendum on the issue indicated that some 25% of the (predominantly white) males eligible to vote favored remaining in the Union at the time the question was originally considered.

The largest concentration of anti-secession sentiment was among the German Texan population in the Texas Hill Country, and in some of the counties of North Texas. In the latter region, most of the residents were originally from states of the Upper South. Some of the leaders initially opposed to secession accepted the Confederate cause once the matter was decided, some withdrew from public life, others left the state, and a few even joined the Union army. Confederate conscription laws forced most men of military age into the Confederate army, regardless of their sentiment. However, at least 2,000 Texans joined the Union ranks.

Many Unionists were executed. Conscription into the Confederate Army was unacceptable to many Unionists and some attempted to flee from Texas. Capt. James Duff, Confederate provost marshal for the Hill Country, executed two Unionists, prompting flight. In August 1862, Confederate soldiers under Lt. Colin D. McRae tracked down a band of German Texans headed out of state and attacked their camp in a bend of the Nueces River. After a pitched battle that resulted in the deaths of two Confederates and the wounding of McRae and eighteen of his men, the Unionists were routed. Approximately 19 Unionists were killed in the fighting. After the battle 9 to 11 of the wounded Unionists were murdered with shots to the head in what became known as the Nueces massacre. Another nine Unionists were pursued and executed in the following weeks. Future Republican congressman Edward Degener was the father of two men who were murdered in the massacre. The German population around Austin County, led by Paul Machemehl, was successful in reaching Mexico.

In October 1862, approximately 150 settlers in and around Cooke County on the Red River were arrested by the 11th Texas Cavalry Regiment led by Colonel William C. Young on the orders of Colonel James Bourland, Confederate Provost Marshal for northern Texas. A court was convened in Gainesville to try them for allegedly plotting to seize the arsenals at Sherman and Gainesville and to kill their Confederate neighbors, seize their property, and to cooperate with Union army forces poised to invade northern Texas from Arkansas and/or Indian Territory. Several of the settlers were hanged in what is now downtown Gainesville during the first week of October. Nineteen additional men were found guilty and hanged before the end of the month. A total of about forty Unionists were hanged in Gainesville, two were shot while trying to escape, and two more were hanged elsewhere after being turned over to a military tribunal. Under the primitive conditions on the Texas frontier during the Civil War, evidence against the accused was questionable, and the legal proceedings were highly imperfect. A granite monument in a small park marks the spot where the hangings took place.

The Confederacy's conscription act proved controversial, not only in Texas but all across the South. Despite the referendum result, some opponents argued that the war was being fought by poor people on behalf of a few wealthy slave owners. The Act exempted from the draft men who owned fifteen or more slaves. Draft resistance was widespread especially among Texans of German or Mexican descent; many of the latter went to Mexico. Potential draftees went into hiding, Confederate officials hunted them down, and many were shot or captured and forced into the army.

=== Sam Houston ===
Sam Houston was the premier Southern Unionist in Texas. While he was a slaveholder and deplored the election of the Lincoln Administration, he considered secession unconstitutional and thought secession at that moment in time was a "rash action" that was certain to lead to a conflict favoring the industrial and populated North. He predicted:

Let me tell you what is coming. After the sacrifice of countless millions of treasure and hundreds of thousands of lives, you may win Southern independence if God be not against you, but I doubt it. I tell you that, while I believe with you in the doctrine of states rights, the North is determined to preserve this Union. They are not a fiery, impulsive people as you are, for they live in colder climates. But when they begin to move in a given direction, they move with the steady momentum and perseverance of a mighty avalanche; and what I fear is, they will overwhelm the South.

Houston rejected the actions of the Texas Secession Convention, believing it had overstepped its authority in becoming a member state of the newly formed Confederacy. He refused to take an oath of allegiance to the Confederacy and was deposed from office. In a speech he wrote, but did not deliver, he said:

Fellow-Citizens, in the name of your rights and liberties, which I believe have been trampled upon, I refuse to take this oath. In the name of the nationality of Texas, which has been betrayed by the Convention, I refuse to take this oath. In the name of the Constitution of Texas, I refuse to take this oath. In the name of my own conscience and manhood, which this Convention would degrade by dragging me before it, to pander to the malice of my enemies, I refuse to take this oath. I deny the power of this Convention to speak for Texas ... I protest ... against all the acts and doings of this convention and I declare them null and void.

After his ouster from the governor's office, Houston maintained a low public profile until his death in July 1863. Before he died, Houston wrote to a friend in June 1861, writing, "There comes a time a man's section is his country...I stand with mine. I was a conservative citizen of the United States...I am now a conservative citizen of the Southern Confederacy."

== Military recruitment ==
Over 70,000 Texans served in the Confederate army and Texas regiments fought in every major battle throughout the war. Some men were veterans of the Mexican–American War; a few had served in the earlier Texas Revolution. The state furnished the Confederacy with 45 regiments of cavalry, 23 regiments of infantry, 12 battalions of cavalry, 4 battalions of infantry, 5 regiments of heavy artillery, and 30 batteries of light artillery. The state maintained at its own expense some additional troops that were for home defense. These included 5 regiments and 4 battalions of cavalry, and 4 regiments and one battalion of infantry. In 1862 the Confederate Congress in Richmond, Virginia, passed a conscription law that ordered all men from 18 to 45 years of age to be placed into military service except ministers, state, city, county officers, and certain slave owners; all persons holding 20 slaves or more were exempt from Confederate conscription under the "Twenty Negro Law".

When the first companies of Texas soldiers reached Richmond, Virginia, Confederate President Jefferson Davis greeted them with the words: "Texans! The troops of other states have their reputations to gain, but the sons of the defenders of the Alamo have theirs to maintain. I am assured that you will be faithful to the trust."

"The Texas Brigade" (also known as "Hood's Brigade") was a unit composed of the 1st, 4th and 5th Texas Infantry Regiments augmented at times by the 18th Georgia Infantry and Hampton's (South Carolina) Legion until they were permanently teamed with the 3rd Arkansas Infantry. Often serving as "shock troops" of General Robert E. Lee's Army of Northern Virginia, the Texas Brigade was "always favorites" of General Lee and on more than one occasion Lee praised their fighting qualities, remarking that none had brought greater honor to their native state than "my Texans." Hood's men suffered severe casualties in a number of fights, most notably at the Battle of Antietam, where they faced off with Wisconsin's Iron Brigade, and at Gettysburg, where they assaulted Houck's Ridge and then Little Round Top.

"Walker's Greyhound Division" was a division composed of four brigades with Texan units; the only division in the Confederate States Army that maintained its single-state composition throughout the war. Formed in 1862, under command of Major General John George Walker it fought in the Western Theater and the Trans-Mississippi Department, and was considered an elite backbone of the army. Detached from the division in 1863, the 4th brigade fought at the Battle of Arkansas Post, where it became isolated and was forced to surrender. A new 4th brigade was added to the division in 1865.

Among the most famous mounted units were Terry's Texas Rangers, a militia of former rangers and frontiersmen, many of whom later became peacekeepers in the Old West; and the 33rd Texas Cavalry Regiment of Colonel Santos Benavides, which guarded the Confederate cotton trade lines from Texas into northern Mexico.

Over 2,000 Texas men joined the Union Army. Notable among them was future Texas governor Edmund J. Davis who initially commanded the Union Army's 1st Texas Cavalry Regiment and rose to the rank of brigadier general.

Texas's relatively large German population around Austin County led by Paul Machemehl tried to remain neutral in the war but eventually left Confederate Texas for Mexico. East Texas gave the most support to secession, and the only east Texas counties in which significant numbers of people opposed secession were Angelina County, Fannin County, and Lamar County, although these counties supplied many men to Texas regiments, including the 9th Texas Infantry Regiment; the 1st Texas Partisan Rangers; 3rd, 4th, 9th, 27th, and 29th Texas Cavalry Regiments; and the 9th Texas Field Battery.

In 1862, Abraham Lincoln named a former United States Congressman, Andrew J. Hamilton, as the Military Governor of Texas. Hamilton held the title throughout the War. During the early stages of Reconstruction Hamilton was named as the first provisional civilian governor. For a time thereafter, active-duty U.S. Army officers served as military governors of Texas.

Years into the war, one Confederate soldier from Texas gave his reasons for fighting for the Confederacy, stating that "we are fighting for our property", while in his view Union soldiers were fighting for the "flimsy and abstract idea that a negro is equal to an Anglo".

== Battles in Texas ==
Texas did not experience many significant battles. However, the Union mounted several attempts to capture the "Trans-Mississippi" regions of Texas and Louisiana from 1862 until the war's end. With ports to the east captured or under blockade, Texas in particular became a blockade-running haven.

== Texas occupation ==
Under the Anaconda Plan, the Union Navy blockaded the principal seaport, Galveston and the entire Gulf and Southern borders, for four years, and federal troops occupied the city for three months in late 1862. Confederate troops under Gen. John B. Magruder recaptured the city on January 1, 1863, and it remained in Confederate hands until the end of the war. A few days later the Confederate raider CSS Alabama attacked and sank the USS Hatteras in a naval engagement off the coast of Galveston.

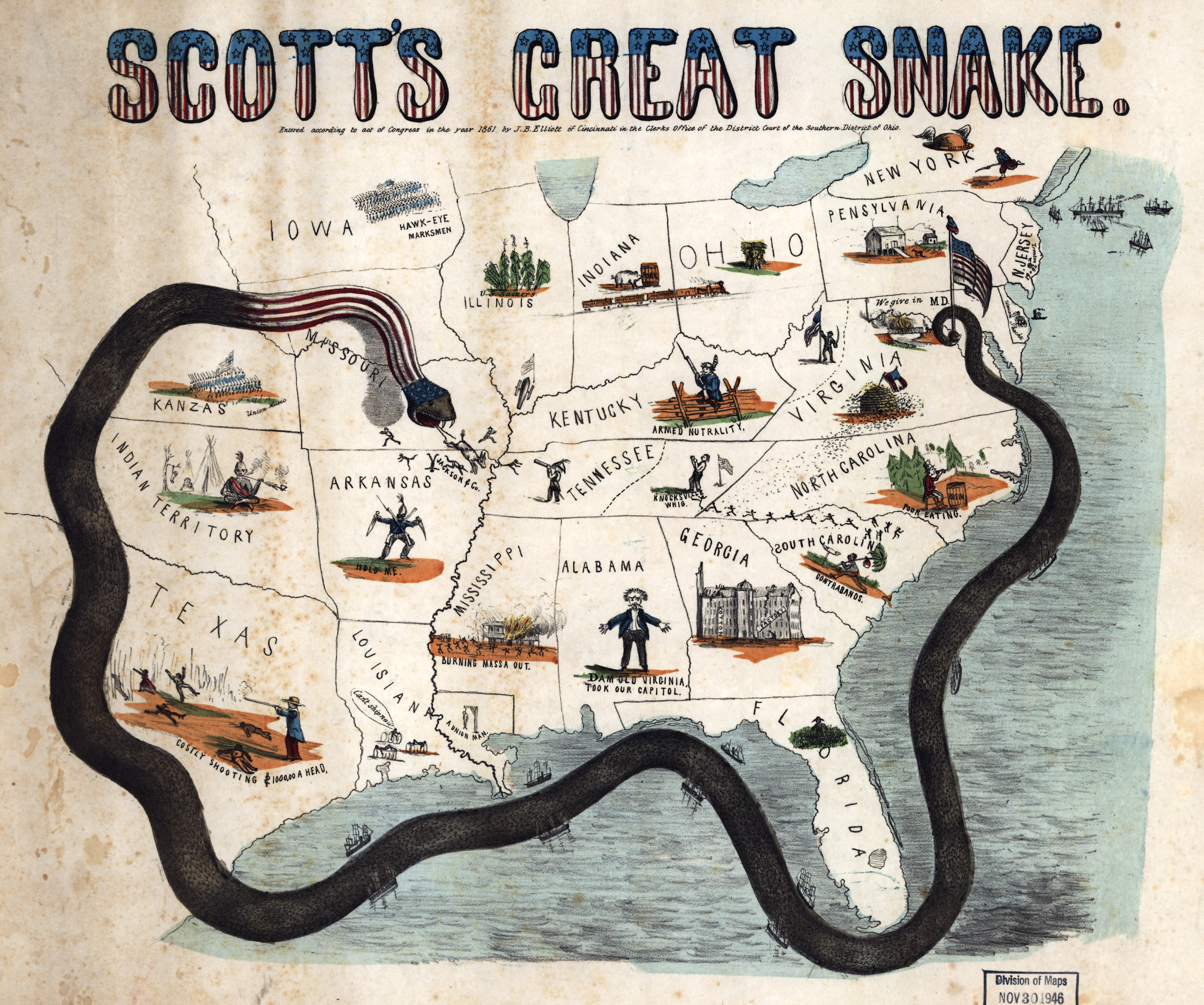
Anaconda Plan, Civil War

Civilian Blockade Runners largely evaded the Union blockades, bandits, and Union-sympathetic Mexicans in order to smuggle cotton out of The Port of Bagdad, Mexico at a premium in exchange for goods on European and black markets, as Texas offered an unparalleled and significant opportunity to export Southern cotton out of the Confederacy. President Lincoln referred to the strategic importance of this economic movement through the Rio Grande to the Secretary of War, Edwin Stanton in 1863 stating, "no local object is now more desirable." The Rio Grande Expedition, led by General Nathaniel P. Banks, was then sent forth to secure the ports near Brownsville and pushed 100 miles in-land, in order to impede the flow of cotton and deny freedom of movement.

A few other cities also fell to Union troops at times during the war, including Port Lavaca, Indianola, and Brownsville. Federal attempts to seize control of Laredo, Corpus Christi, and Sabine Pass failed. By the end of the war no territory but Brazos Island and El Paso was in Union hands. The California Column occupied the region around El Paso from 1862 to the end of the war.

The most notable military battle in Texas during the war happened on September 8, 1863. At the Second Battle of Sabine Pass, a small garrison of 46 Confederates from the mostly-Irish Davis Guards under Lt. Richard W. Dowling, 1st Texas Heavy Artillery, defeated a much larger Union force from New Orleans under Gen. William B. Franklin. Skilled gunnery by Dowling's troops disabled the lead ships in Franklin's flotilla, prompting the remainder—4,000 men on 27 ships—to retreat back to New Orleans. This victory against such overwhelming odds resulted in the Confederate Congress passing a special resolution of recognition, and the only contemporary military decoration of the South, the Davis Guards Medal. CSA President Jefferson Davis stated, "Sabine Pass will stand, perhaps for all time, as the greatest military victory in the history of the world."

In 1864, many Texas forces, including a division under Camille de Polignac, a French prince and Confederate general, moved into Northwestern Louisiana to stall Union Maj. Gen. Nathaniel Banks' Red River Campaign, which was intended to advance into Texas from its eastern border. Confederate forces halted the expedition at the Battle of Mansfield, just east of the Texas border.

Union forces from Brazos Island launched the Brazos Santiago Expedition, leading to the last battle of the Civil War, the Battle of Palmito Ranch, fought in Texas on May 12, 1865, well after Robert E. Lee's surrender on April 9, 1865, at Old Appomattox Court House, Virginia.

== Collapse of Confederate authority in Texas ==
In the spring of 1865, Texas contained over 60,000 soldiers of the Army of the Trans-Mississippi under General Edmund Kirby Smith. As garrison troops far removed from the main theaters of the war, morale had deteriorated to the point of frequent desertion and thievery. News of the surrender of Lee and other Confederate generals east of the Mississippi finally reached Texas around April 20. Local Confederate authorities had mixed opinions on their future course of action. Most senior military leaders vowed to press on with the war, including commanding general Kirby Smith. Many soldiers, however, greeted frequent speeches whose theme was "fight on, boys" with derision, or simply failed to attend them.

The month of May brought increasing rates of desertion. News of Joseph E. Johnston's and Richard Taylor's surrenders confirmed that Texas, Louisiana, and Arkansas were now essentially alone to continue the Confederate cause. On May 14, troops in Galveston briefly mutinied, but were persuaded to remain under arms. However, morale continued to sink. Generals John B. Magruder and Kirby Smith (who had already corresponded with Union Maj. Gen. John Pope regarding surrender terms on May 9) no longer sought to rally their demoralized troops, but rather began discussing the distribution of Confederate government property. Magruder pleaded that the rapid disbanding of the army would prevent depredations by disgruntled soldiers against the civilian population.

The haste to disband the army, combined with the pressing need to protect Confederate property from Union confiscation, created general mayhem. Soldiers began openly pillaging the Galveston quartermasters stores on May 21. Over the next few days, a mob demanded that a government warehouse be opened to them, and soldiers detained and plundered a train. Several hundred civilians sacked the blockade runner Lark when it docked on May 24, and troops sent to pacify the crowd soon joined in the plunder. On May 23, residents in Houston sacked the ordnance building and the clothing bureau. Riots continued in the city until May 26. Both government and private stores were raided extensively in Tyler, Marshall, Huntsville, Gonzales, Hempstead, La Grange, and Brownsville. In Navasota, a powder explosion cost eight lives and flattened twenty buildings. In Austin, the State Treasury was raided and $17,000 in gold was stolen. By May 27, half of the original Confederate forces in Texas had deserted or been disbanded, and formal order had disappeared into lawlessness in many areas of Texas.

The formal remnants of Kirby Smith's army had finally disintegrated by the end of May. Upon his arrival in Houston from Shreveport, the general called a court of inquiry to investigate the "causes and manner of the disbandment of the troops in the District of Texas, New Mexico and Arizona." The May 30 findings laid the blame primarily on the civilian population. Kirby Smith addressed his few remaining soldiers and condemned those that had fled for not struggling to the last and leaving him "a commander without an army– a General without troops." On June 2, he formally surrendered what was left of the Army of the "Trans-Mississippi".

== Restoration to the Union ==
Following the end of the Civil War, Texas was part of the Fifth Military District.

Federal troops didn't arrive in Texas to restore order until June 19, 1865, when Union Maj. Gen. Gordon Granger and 2,000 Union soldiers arrived on Galveston Island to take possession of the state and enforce the new freedoms of former slaves. The Texas holiday Juneteenth commemorates this date. The Stars and Stripes were not raised over Austin until July 25.

President Andrew Johnson appointed Union General Andrew J. Hamilton, a prominent politician before the war, as the provisional governor on June 17. He granted amnesty to ex-Confederates if they promised to support the Union in the future, appointing some to office. As mandated by federal Reconstruction policy, Hamilton called a constitutional convention for the purpose of assenting to the government's prescribed requirements for former Confederate states to be accepted back into the Union. Convention delegates were required to adopt an oath of amnesty, as were voters in the election that chose said delegates. Although the convention's representatives agreed to the minimum requirements for readmission – committing to nullify Texas's secession ordinance, ratify the Thirteenth Amendment abolishing slavery throughout the United States, and repudiate all debts incurred over the time the state had been in rebellion – they showed an unwillingness to cooperate with the federal government's aims for the South beyond this. Delegates refused to grant suffrage to the state's black residents, and Texas would not ratify the Fourteenth and Fifteenth Amendments, establishing equality under the law and prohibiting disenfranchisement on the basis of race respectively, until 1870. In addition, the state did not totally disavow its Confederate past at the convention, refusing to declare that the act of secession had been invalid from the beginning despite the pleas of Unionist delegates. Most controversially, the state continued to grant legal recognition to all actions taken by its Confederate government that did not violate the federal Constitution. The proceedings of the constitutional convention would result in the Constitution of 1866.

These efforts would prove insufficient to gain the satisfaction of Congressional Republicans, who demanded more from Texas before it could be permitted to re-enter the Union as a state. Thus, a second constitutional convention would be called, which produced a new document, the Constitution of 1869. This constitution expanded the franchise to all men over 21 years old, regardless of race, and guaranteed a number of other civil rights to freedmen. The process leading to this document's adoption was highly irregular. Edmund J. Davis, the convention's president, was a committed Radical Republican dissatisfied with the compromises made in drafting the document. Davis tried to adjourn the convention after the draft had been engrossed but before a final vote could be held on its adoption. After he stepped down from chairing the meeting, he was blocked from leaving the hall in which it was convening. Thereafter, a committee acting at the behest of General Edward Canby retrieved the document before officially adjourning the session. A group consisting of the convention's secretary; one delegate each from the moderate Republican, Radical Republican, and Democratic factions; and one military officer serving under Canby was formed to prepare the final draft, which was ultimately signed by only forty-five of the convention's ninety-four delegates, plus Davis, who had been forced to affix his signature by Canby. Satisfied with the new constitution and with Texas's recent ratification of all three Reconstruction Amendments, on March 30, 1870, the United States Congress permitted Texas' representatives to take their seat in Congress.

== Notable Civil War leaders from Texas ==
A number of notable leaders were associated with Texas during the Civil War. John Bell Hood gained fame as the commander of the Texas Brigade in the Army of Northern Virginia and played a prominent role as an army commander late in the war. "Sul" Ross was a significant leader in a number of "Trans-Mississippi" Confederate armies. Felix Huston Robertson was the only native Texan Confederate general. Capt. T. J. Goree was one of Lt. General James Longstreet's most trusted aides. John H. Reagan was an influential member of Jefferson Davis's cabinet. Col. Santos Benavides was a Confederate colonel during the American Civil War. Benavides was the highest-ranking Tejano soldier to serve in the Confederate military.

The office of Governor of Texas was in flux throughout the war, with several men in power at various times. Sam Houston was governor when Texas seceded from the United States, but refused to declare any loyalty to the new Confederacy. He was replaced by Lieutenant Governor Edward Clark. Clark filled the rest of Houston's term in 1861, and narrowly lost re-election by just 124 votes to Francis Lubbock. During his tenure, Lubbock supported Confederate conscription, working to draft all able-bodied men, including resident aliens, into the Confederate army. When Lubbock's term ended in 1863, he joined the military. Ardent secessionist Pendleton Murrah replaced him in office. Even after Robert E. Lee surrendered in 1865, Murrah encouraged Texans to continue the rebellion, and he and several supporters fled to Mexico.

=== Notable Civil War leaders (Confederacy) from Texas ===
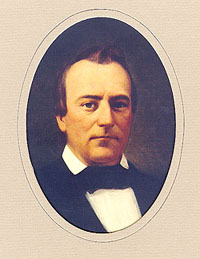
Governor
Francis Lubbock

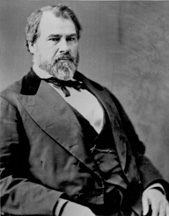
Postmaster General
John Henninger Reagan

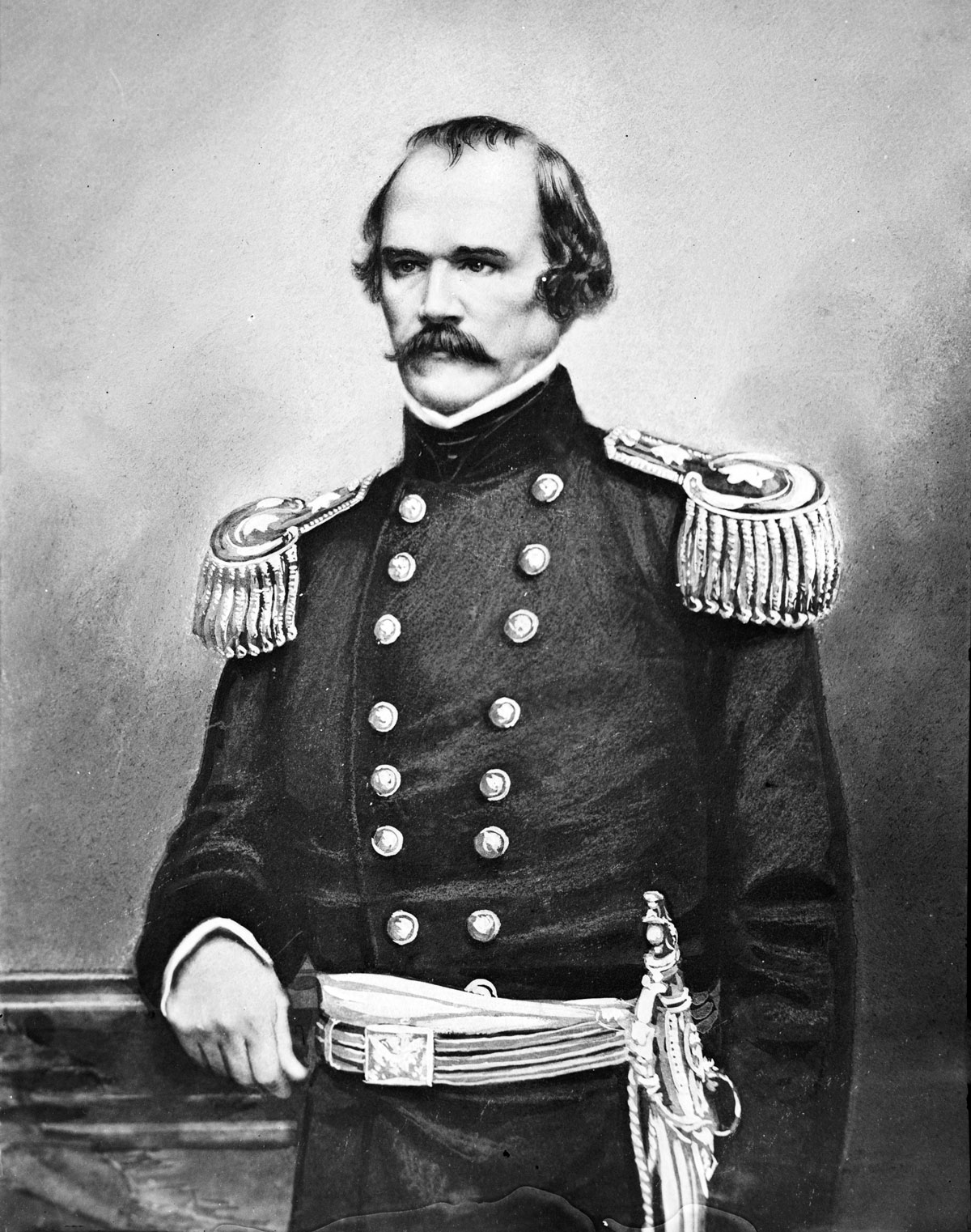
Gen.
A. S. Johnston

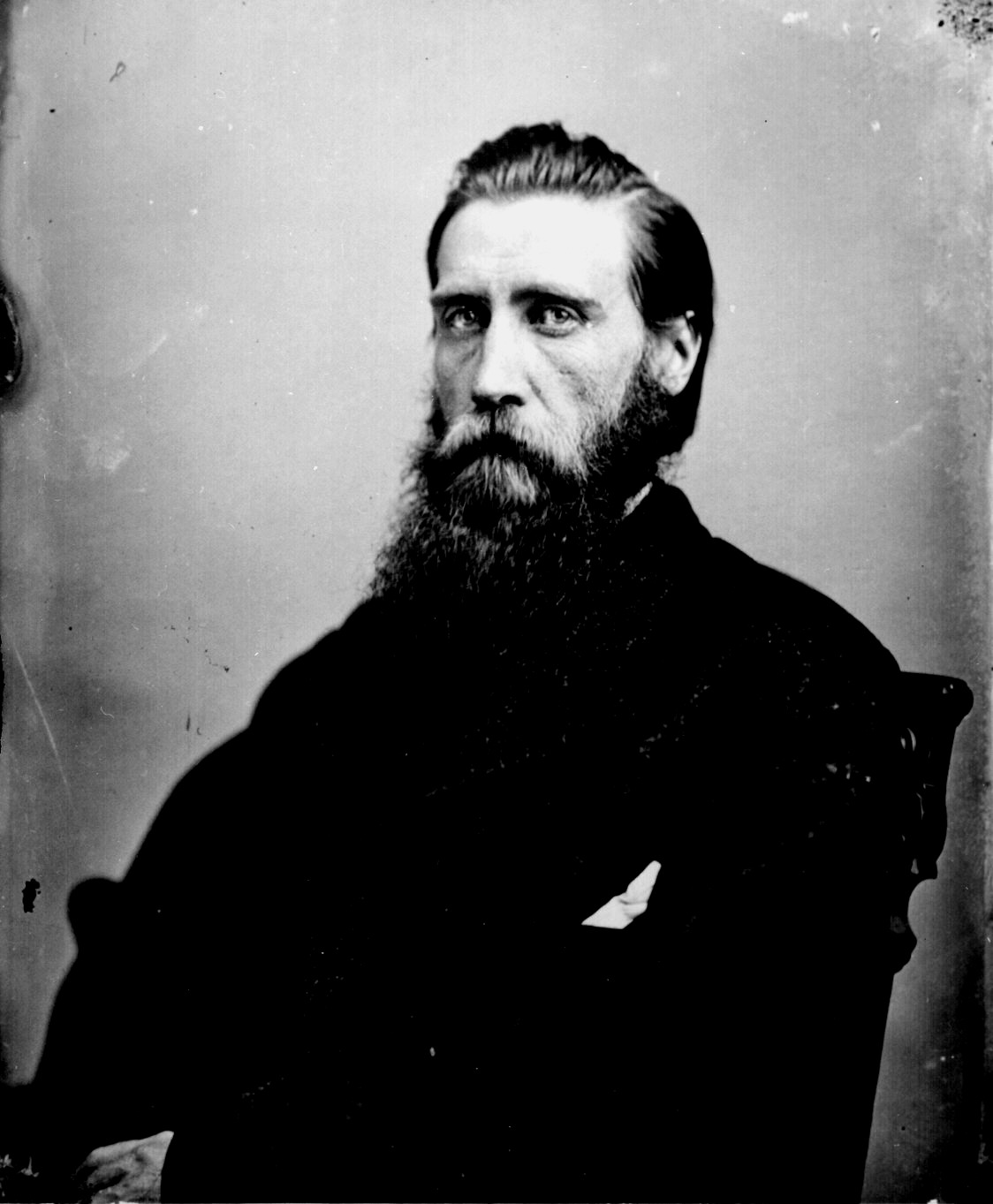
Lt. Gen.
John Bell Hood

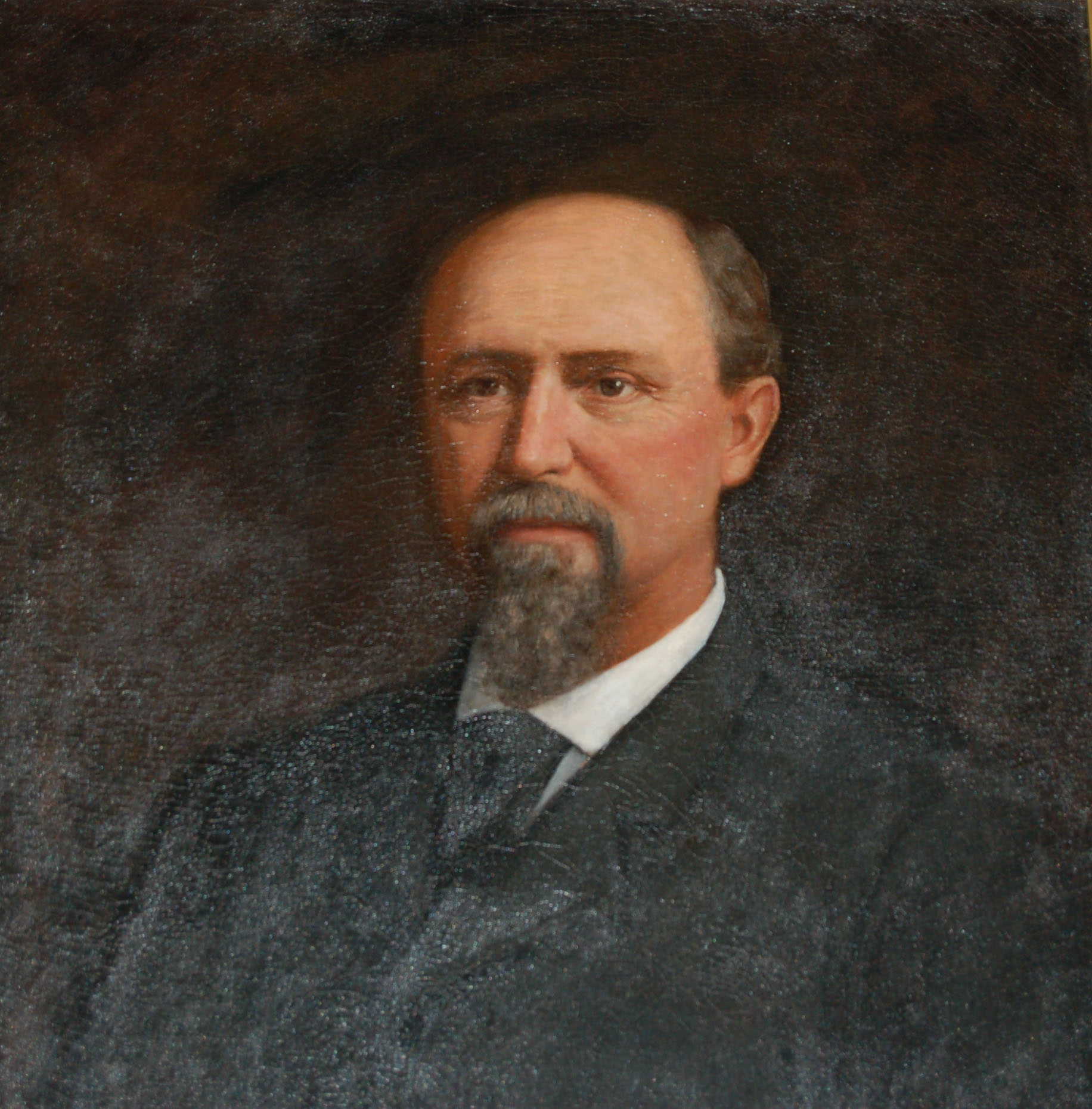
Maj. Gen.
Lawrence Sullivan Ross

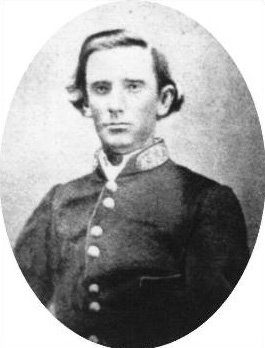
Maj. Gen.
John A. Wharton

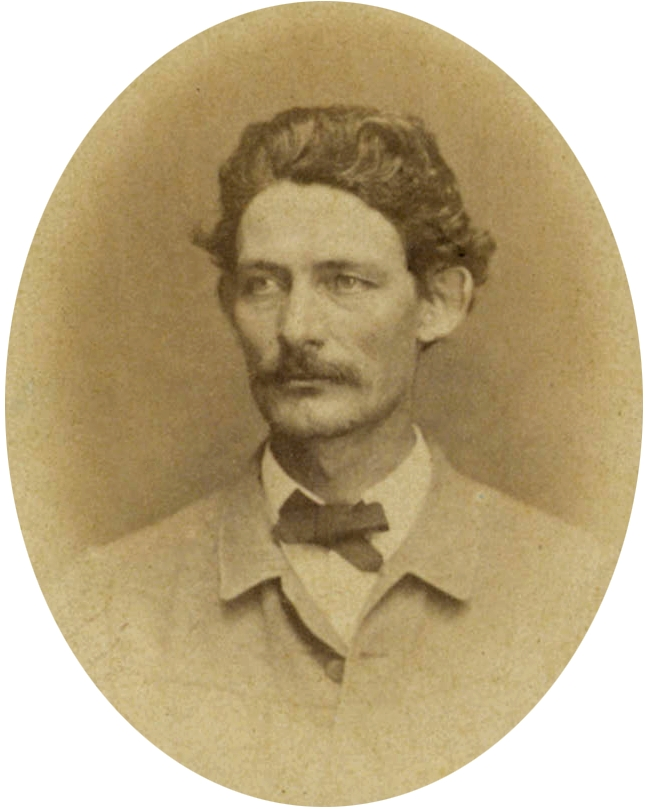
Brig. Gen.
Hiram B. Granbury

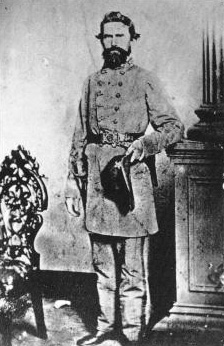
Brig. Gen.
Jerome B. Robertson

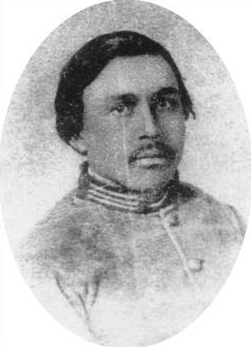
Brig. Gen.
Felix Huston Robertson

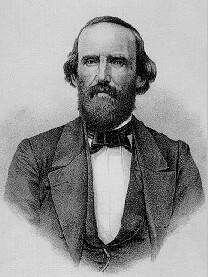
Brig. Gen.
Benjamin McCulloch

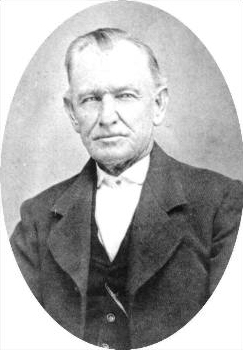
Brig. Gen.
Henry E. McCulloch

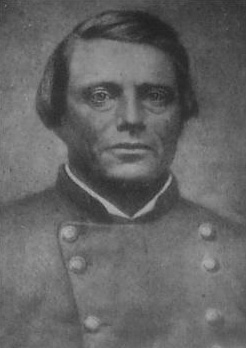
Brig. Gen.
Thomas Green

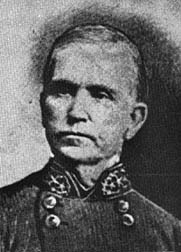
Brig. Gen.
Thomas Harrison

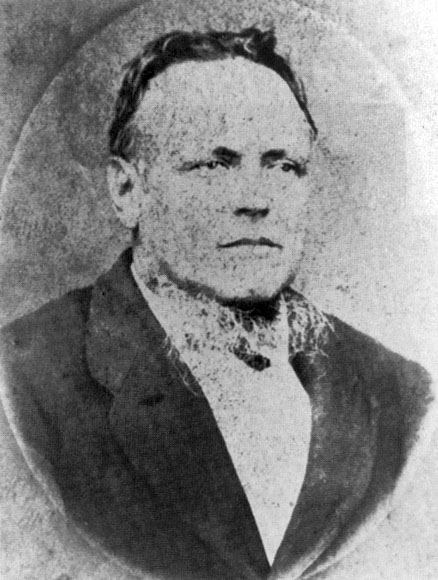
Lt. Col.
Santos Benavides

=== Notable Civil War leaders (Union) from Texas ===
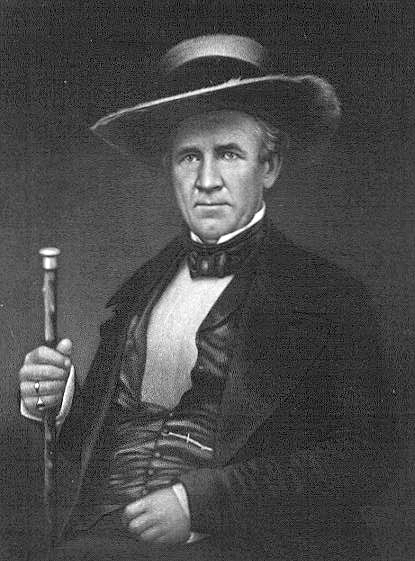
Governor
Sam Houston (Union)

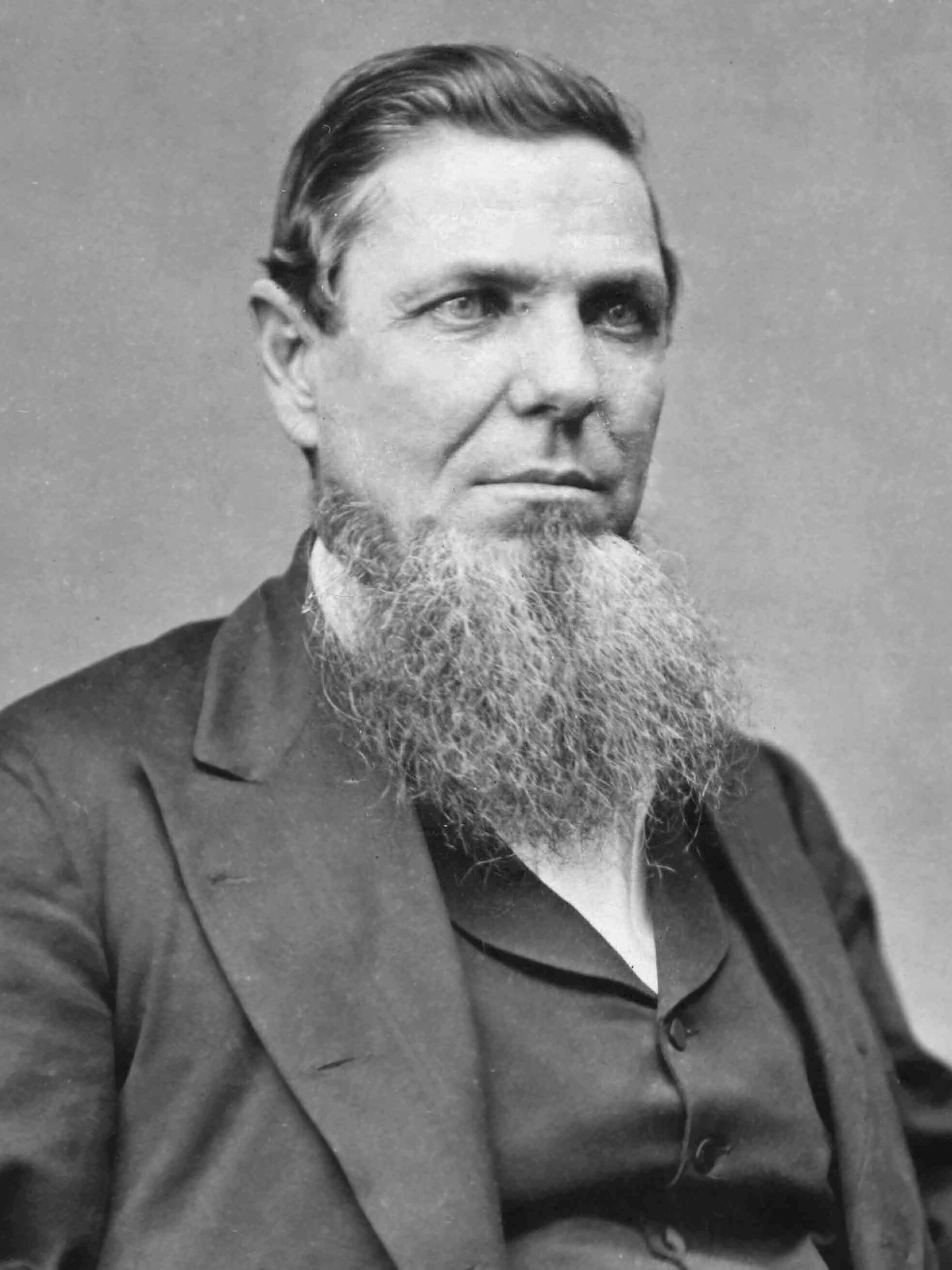
Governor
Andrew J. Hamilton

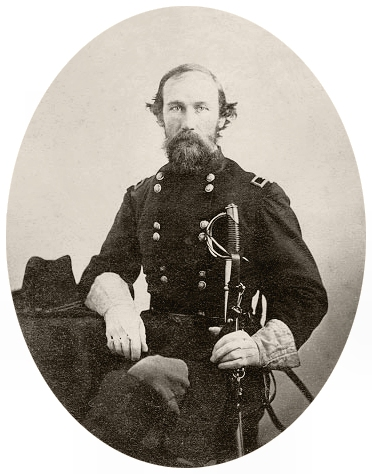
Brig. Gen.
Edmund J. Davis

== Aftermath ==
Although one of the original members of the Confederate States of America, much of Texas was not settled until after the Civil War. However, Confederate Heroes Day is an official state holiday, and the month of April is recognized by the Texas Senate as Confederate History Month. Although not an official holiday, April 26 is, among Southern historical organizations within the state, often observed as "Confederate Memorial Day." On the south lawn of the state capital in Austin is a Confederate monument, and several other memorials to individual Texas Confederate military units are nearby. In addition, most Texas county courthouse grounds feature a Confederate memorial. Texas' largest city, Houston, featured a monument to the Confederacy at its oldest city park, Sam Houston Park, titled Spirit of the Confederacy. It was sculpted in bronze by Louis Amateis in 1908. However, Houston mayor Sylvester Turner announced on June 11, 2020, that it will be removed. It was relocated to the Houston Museum of African American Culture on June 17, 2020.

== See also ==
- Confederate States of America – animated map of state secession and Confederacy
- List of Texas Civil War Confederate units
- List of Texas Civil War Union units
- History of slavery in Texas

Preceded by Louisiana	List of C.S. states by date of admission to the Confederacy; Ratified Constitution on March 23, 1861 (4th)	Succeeded by Mississippi
