= James Weston Miller =

American Presbyterian minister (1815–1888)

- Born: November 15, 1815; Erie County, Pennsylvania
- Died: April 29, 1888 (aged 72); Gay Hill, Washington County, Texas
- Education: Waterford Academy; Jefferson College; Presbyterian Western Theological Seminary
- Occupations: Clergyman, educator
- Title: Reverend
- Spouses: Elizabeth McKennan; Elizabeth Scott Stuart
- Children: 4 sons, 3 daughters
- Parent(s): Jeremiah Miller; Elizabeth (Weston) Miller

James Weston Miller (1815-1888) was an American Presbyterian minister, educator and Confederate chaplain in Texas during the American Civil War. He helped establish the First Presbyterian church in Houston and many Baptist and Methodist churches and schools for blacks. He also taught many daughters of the Southern aristocracy at the Live Oak Female Seminary in Gay Hill, Texas.

== Biography ==
=== Early life ===
James Weston Miller was born on November 15, 1815, in Erie County, Pennsylvania. His father was Jeremiah Miller and his mother, Elizabeth (Weston) Miller. He had eight siblings. His family was Methodist.

He graduated from Waterford Academy in 1835 and graduated from Jefferson College in Canonsburg, Pennsylvania, in 1840. He then graduated from the Presbyterian Western Theological Seminary in Allegheny, Pennsylvania.

=== Career ===
He served as assistant to Matthew Brown, the President of Jefferson College, his alma mater, in 1841. He then became a Principal at the Grove Academy in Steubenville, Ohio, where he became friends with Dr Charles Clinton Beatty, the President of Steubenville Female Seminary, until 1843.

He moved to Houston, Texas, in 1844. He gave sermons in the Texas Capitol, sometimes attended by Sam Houston, the President of the Texas Republic. A year later, in 1845, he oversaw the construction of the First Presbyterian Church of Houston. He served as Presbyterian minister there from 1847. Theologically, he believed that salvation was for the living, and that one could not repent just before death. He also became a delegate to the Presbyterian General Assembly that same year. He was a member of the Texas Literary Institute. In 1849, he helped decide on Huntsville, Texas, as the location of the Presbyterian Texas College. He also helped charter Austin College in Austin, Texas, where he served on the Board of Trustees from 1849 to 1878.

In 1850, he moved to Gay Hill, Washington County, Texas, a small town home to the Mount Prospect Presbyterian Church, where he served as Presbyterian minister for one year. The church was the second oldest Presbyterian church in Texas, having been established by Hugh Wilson in 1839. The following year, in 1851, he became the first clerk of the Synod of Texas in Austin, Texas. From 1851 to 1861, he was a pastor in Washington-on-the-Brazos. Meanwhile, he established the (now defunct) Live Oak Female Seminary in Gay Hill, where he taught many daughters of the Southern aristocracy.

He was a minister to many blacks, included those on the Glenblythe Plantation owned by Thomas Affleck in Gay Hill. During the American Civil War of 1861-1865, he served as a Confederate chaplain under Brigadier General Thomas Neville Waul. Shortly after the war, he helped establish many Baptist and Methodist churches, cemeteries and schools for blacks.

He taught at the Post Oak Academy from 1865 to 1867. He then resumed his ministry in Washington-on-the-Brazos up until 1876. From 1877 to 1880, he was a pastor in Galatia, Texas. He also served as minister in Round Top, Brenham, and Chapel Hill. In 1881, he joined the Board of Trustees of the Stuart Academy in Austin, founded by his sister-in-law, Rebecca Stuart.

He made mustang wine every fall.

=== Personal life ===
He married Elizabeth McKennan in 1847. They had two sons. She died in 1850, he got remarried to Elizabeth Scott Stuart, his first cousin, in 1852. They had two sons and three daughters.

=== Death ===
He died on April 29, 1888, in Gay Hill, Texas.

== Legacy ==
His private residence, Oak Lodge, also known as "the old Miller Home," was dedicated as a library-museum in 1933.
