= Mustang wine =

Red wine from Texas

Mustang wine is a type of red wine made with mustang grapes, Vitis mustangensis, in Texas.

== History ==
Prior to the American Civil War of 1861–1865, Thomas Affleck (1812–1868), a Scottish immigrant and nurseryman who became a Southern planter, made mustang wine on his Glenblythe Plantation located in Gay Hill, Washington County, Texas, and advertised it for commercial sale. He described it as "a pleasant and wholesome table drink" and "a tonic for patients recovering from prostrating fevers, and for Females who may have been long in delicate health." Moreover, he published a recipe, which was used by others and commented upon in the Southern press, as in the Southern Cultivator.

The wine was sometimes used as a way to thank guests and friends. For example, Dr J. H. Lyons, who went on to serve as the Mayor of San Antonio, Texas in 1865 and again in 1866–67, offered it to guests in the 1860s. Additionally, pioneer explorer Gideon Lincecum (1793–1874) once gave a bottle and the recipe to geologist George Getz Shumard (1823–1867) to thank Shumard for sending him a copy of his pamphlet entitled, Notice of Fossils from the Permian Strata of Texas to New Mexico. Presbyterian minister James Weston Miller (1815–1888), a Confederate chaplain and founder of Live Oak Female Seminary in Gay Hill, also made mustang wine every fall.

In the nineteenth century, mustang wine was thought to prevent malaria, and it was often given to children.

== Recipe ==
As described in a recipe published in 1871, mustang grapes would first have to be crushed and left to ferment for twelve to fifteen hours. The next step is to remove the hulls and keep the juice. Sugar then needs to be added. After letting it rest for a day, it is transferred into a barrel, where sugar (and sometimes white whiskey) are added.

== Cultural references ==
Mustang wine has also been alluded to in popular culture. For example, country music singer Steve Earle, a Texas native, has a song called Mustang Wine. Later, singer Carl Perkins recorded another version of Mustang Wine. The song was scheduled to be recorded by Elvis Presley, but he failed to go to the studio to record it.
