= Thomas Affleck (planter) =

Scottish-American nurseryman, almanac editor, and agrarian writer and Southern planter.

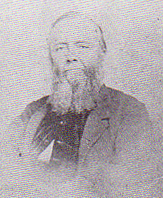
- Born: July 13, 1812; Dumfries, Scotland
- Died: December 30, 1868 (aged 56); Gay Hill, Washington County, Texas
- Occupations: Planter, editor, writer
- Spouse: Anna Dunbar Smith
- Children: 1
- Relatives: Mary Hunt Affleck (daughter-in-law)

Thomas Affleck (July 13, 1812 – December 30, 1868) was a Scottish-American nurseryman, almanac editor, and agrarian writer and Southern plantation owner. He published the Southern Rural Almanac and Plantation and Garden Calendar from 1851 to 1861.

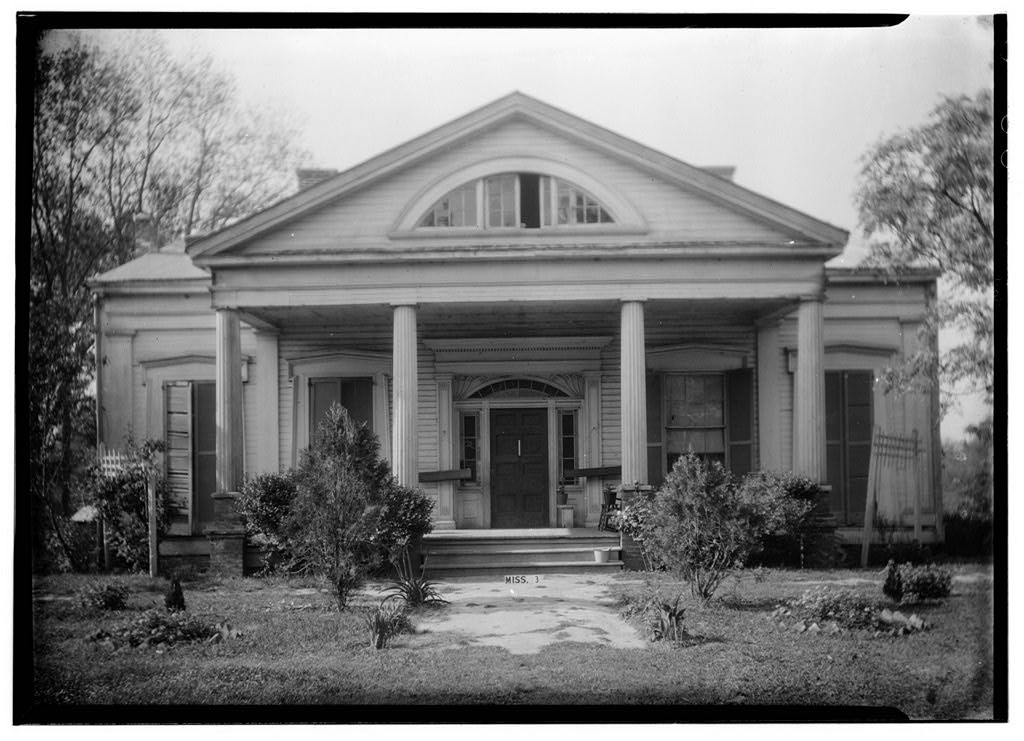
Ingleside in Washington, Mississippi

He and his wife, Anna M. Dunbar Smith, owned Ingleside, an estate in Washington, Mississippi, where he founded his Southern Nurseries, one of the South's earliest nurseries. His wife also owned several plantations and enslaved people in Adams and Wilkinson Counties. In the mid-1850s, Affleck purchased Glenblythe Plantation in Gay Hill, Washington County, Texas, where he, his family, and enslaved people moved in 1860. Affleck also published Affleck's Southern Rural Almanac and Plantation and Garden Calendar from Ingleside, 1851 to 1859, and Glenblythe, 1860 to 1861. At Glenblythe, he established Central Nurseries. He was the first Southern writer whose work on plants was widely read; he also published two best-selling guides for cotton and sugar plantation and farming accounting.

== Early life ==
Thomas Affleck was born on July 13, 1812, in Dumfries, Scotland. His father was Thomas Affleck and his mother, Mary (Hannay) Affleck. He graduated from the University of Edinburgh, where he studied agriculture. Not yet 20, he immigrated to the United States, arriving on May 4, 1832.

== Career ==
From 1832 to 1840, Affleck worked as a clerk and merchant in New York City, Pennsylvania, Indiana and Ohio. He served as the editor of the Western Farmer and Gardener in Cincinnati, Ohio from 1840 to 1842.

Affleck acquired Ingleside Farm in Washington, Mississippi, where he established Southern Nurseries in 1848. It became one of the earliest commercial plant nurseries in the Southern United States. He was one of the first nurserymen in the South, selling plants and writing about plants from the South. Most agricultural and gardening advice had previously been written by authorities from Europe or the Northern United States.

In 1848, Affleck edited Norman's Southern Agricultural Almanac, an almanac published by Benjamin Moore Norman (1809–1860). He also published the Southern Rural Almanac and Plantation and Garden Calendar from 1851 to 1861. His "Report on Agricultural Grasses," appeared as a Senate executive document in 1879. He is credited with advancing agriculture in Texas thanks to his writing. Moreover, he published two books about his plantation, where he cultivated the commodity crops of cotton and sugar cane with slave labor: Cotton Plantation Record and Account Book and Sugar Plantation Record and Account Book. They became widely popular among the planter class, who used them as models for their own plantations.

In 1859, he purchased the Glenblythe Plantation in Gay Hill, Washington County, Texas. The China rose cultivar, ‘Old Gay Hill Red China’, was likely grown by Affleck, and was found in Old Gay Hill. He made mustang wine with mustang grapes found on the plantation. During the American Civil War of 1861–1865, he invited Thomas Neville Waul (1813–1903), a brigadier general in the Confederate States Army, to organize the Waul's Legion at Glenblythe plantation, who used it as a military camp.

Affleck supported recruiting more English and Scottish immigrants to come to Texas. He tried to establish beef-packing factories with direct shipping lines from Texas to Europe.

== Personal life ==
He married Anna Dunbar Smith, the niece of Jane Herbert Wilkinson Long (1798–1880), on April 19, 1842, in Washington, Mississippi. They had one son, Isaac Dunbar Affleck, who married the poet Mary Hunt Affleck.

== Death ==
Affleck died on December 30, 1868, on the Glenblythe Plantation in Gay Hill, Washington County, Texas.

== Bibliography ==
- Bee-Breeding in the West (1841)
- Cotton Plantation Record and Account Book (1847)
- Sugar Plantation Record and Account Book (1848)
- Hedging and Hedging Plants in the Southern States (1869)
