= Gay Hill, Texas =

Gay Hill, Texas may refer to following ghost towns:

- Gay Hill, Washington County, Texas
- Gay Hill, Fayette County, Texas, in Fayette County, Texas, six miles southeast of La Grange, Texas
- Gay Hill, Milam County, Texas, in Milam County, Texas, seven miles away from Rockdale, Texas
