= Cotton Plantation Record and Account Book =

1840s book by Thomas Affleck

Broadside advertisement for the Cotton Plantation Record and Account Book

The Cotton Plantation Record and Account Book is a best-selling and pioneering guide to farm accounting in the antebellum cotton-producing regions of the United States. It was first published in 1847 or 1848 by Thomas Affleck (1812–1868), a Scottish immigrant and owner of the town house Ingleside, in Washington, Adams County, Mississippi, 1842 to 1860, and later Glenblythe Plantation in Gay Hill, Washington County, Texas, beginning in the late 1850s. The book contains a detailed system, including blank tables to be filled in, that allowed plantation owners to track the efficiency of their production. It also includes essays on various aspects of plantation management, such as the proper care and discipline of slaves.

== History and influence ==
Thomas Affleck published the first edition of the Cotton Plantation Record and Account Book in 1847 or 1848. In 1848 he established a plant nursery and experimental cotton farm at Ingleside, Washington, Mississippi. Later, discussing the origin of his Account Book, Affleck wrote:

During my first year's planting, I prepared two books with the pen, almost identical to that now published for the cotton plantation, and gave one to each of my next year's overseers, making it a part of my contract with them, that these books were to be correctly kept and returned to me at the end of the year. And, with a little assistance and encouragement, it was done. And what a satisfaction it was to me! Soon after that, at the suggestion of a New Orleans Publisher, I prepared him a transcript of the plan for publication.

Affleck published new editions every year thereafter until the American Civil War of 1861–1865. After the war, the name of the book was changed to The Farmers' Record and Account Book and the scope widened to include "any system of husbandry, ... the products of any climate, and ... farms of any extent." Affleck's book was a consistent antebellum bestseller in the cotton-producing states of the lower Mississippi River Valley.

Historian Mark M. Smith has noted that "it was precisely on plantations that masters employed the most rigorous, capitalist management techniques," which created a need for specialized ledgers and accounting techniques, Affleck's being "one of the most popular [of these] record book brands." By the end of the 1850s, his Account Book had sold over three thousand copies, contributing to his powerful influence on the direction of the "plantation economy into scientific and systematic channels."

According to historian Robert Williams, Affleck's manual included "a number of other forms which marked an improvement in the system of rural book-keeping. The record forms were essentially consistent with the intent and purpose of modern cost-accounting, and followed the best and most advanced principles of efficient administrative management."

Advertisement for the Cotton Plantation Record and Account Book published in 1854 in The American Cotton Planter

== Contents ==
The book contained a detailed system which allowed plantation owners to record and track the accounts of their plantations, including pounds of cotton produced per slave, per acre, per bale of cotton, and the gross and net value of production. Space was also provided for recording births and deaths of slaves, their clothing and tools, and other such assets and debits. Unlike many contemporary systems of agricultural book-keeping, Affleck's book took account of depreciation, the costs of labor, and other "often neglected factors." According to historian Walter Johnson, the book "provided a convenient table by which slaves' annual increase in value could be tracked in the same set of tables as their daily cotton production, and a page at the back where the planter could fill in the value of his slave force, and calculate "interest on the same at ten percent.""

It was published in four numbers for plantations with fewer than 40, 80, 120, and 160 "hands," which retailed for $2.50, $3.00, $3.50, and $4.00 respectively. It also contained advertising for the slave markets of New Orleans.

Affleck's book also contained essays and advice on slave management, including, e.g., George Washington's instructions to his own slave overseer and instructions for managing the health of slaves.

=== The Duties of an Overseer ===
The Account Book included Affleck's essay, The Duties of an Overseer, which noted that one of the most important aspects "of a fine crop is an increase in the number and a marked increase in the condition and value of the negroes." Slaveowners, for various reasons, were willing or eager to allow their slaves to attend religious services and Affleck, in The Duties of an Overseer, agreed with this practice:

You will find that an hour devoted every Sabbath morning to their moral and religious instruction would prove a great aid to you in bringing about a better state of things amongst the Negroes. It has been thoroughly tried, and with the most satisfactory results, in many parts of the South. As a matter of mere interest it has proved to be advisable, to say nothing of it as a point of duty. The effect upon their general good behavior, their cleanliness, and good conduct on the Sabbath is such as alone to recommend it to the Planter and Overseer.
