= Glenblythe Plantation =

Plantation in Texas, United States

Coordinates: 30.271°N 96.495°W

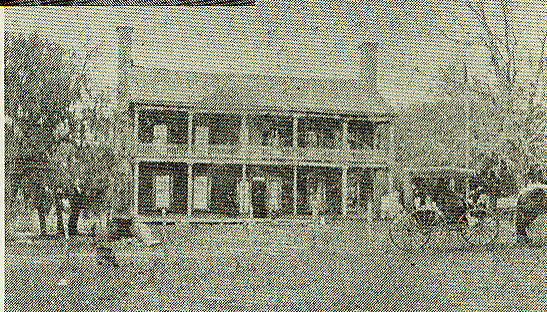
Glenblythe Plantation, former home of Thomas Affleck (1812–1868).

The Glenblythe Plantation is a former plantation in Gay Hill, Washington County, Texas. Before the American Civil War, it was cultivated with slave labor. The plantation home is no longer standing, however in 1967, a historical marker was installed where it used to stand, as a reminder of a bygone era.

== History ==
=== Beginnings ===
It was established in 1859 by Thomas Affleck (1812–1868), a Scottish immigrant, nurseryman, agrarian writer and planter, who also had property in Washington, Mississippi. The Glenblythe Plantation was located in what is now the ghost town of Gay Hill near Brenham in Washington County, Texas. The name Glenblythe is Scottish Gaelic for "joyous valley."

The plantation house had two and a half floors. It included six bedrooms, two halls, a kitchen, a laundry room, a store room, a dining room, a parlor, three enclosed galleries, and two long galleries alongside the house. Next door, there was a lumber room, a carriage house, a granary, stables, a poultry yard, a pigeonry, and servants' houses. There were also six houses for farmhands. Additionally, there was another house for the overseer. Two miles away, there was a church, a hospital, a storehouse, and twenty frame houses, a sugar mill, a flour mill, a gin house, a press, a sawmill, a blacksmith shop, and another house for the mill foreman.

=== Commercial uses ===
The plantation was primarily used for agricultural purposes and contained a winery. There were fields of cotton, corn, barley, millet, hay, and sorghum. Affleck also bred stock such as sheep, cows, mules, oxen, and horses. The plantation was home to one of the largest and earliest plant nurseries in the American South, known as "Central Nurseries." Affleck, who had studied agriculture at the University of Edinburgh, experimented with new crops and also discovered some plants endemic to the South. For example, he discovered the Old Gay Hill Red China, a rose plant which is native to Gay Hill.

There was also a winery, where mustang wine was made with mustang grapes, or vitis mustangensis, for commercial use. Affleck advertised his wine in some of his writing.

=== Slaves ===
On top of the overseer and white farmhands, there were about 120 black slaves on the plantation. They were looked after by a black nurse and a doctor, who saw them at least once a month. In his essay entitled The Duties of an Overseer, published in his 1847 best-selling book, the Cotton Plantation Record and Account Book, Affleck emphasized the need to provide slaves with adequate food, clothing, medical care, and access to Christian church services, in order to increase their productivity. However, shortly after the American Civil War of 1861 to 1865, he complained that his freed slaves had become lazy, neglectful, and disrespectful; by then, he had lost much of his financial clout.

=== Civil War ===
This plantation played a minor role in the American Civil War. In 1862, Thomas Neville Waul (1813–1903), a brigadier general in the Confederate States Army, was a guest at the plantation. During his stay, he organized the Waul's Legion, who used the grounds of the plantation as a camp. After the war was lost, Affleck rented his plantation to recoup his financial loss. He advertised it in the New York Herald.
