= Southern Cultivator =

American publication

- Founder(s): J. W. Jones; W. S. Jones
- Publisher: J. P. Harrison
- Editor: Dennis Redmond; Charles Wallace Howard
- Founded: 1843
- Ceased publication: 1935
- Language: English
- Headquarters: Augusta, Georgia

The Southern Cultivator is a defunct agrarian publication that was published in the Southern United States.

== History ==
The journal was started by J. W. Jones and W. S. Jones in Augusta, Georgia in 1843. Its publication started prior to De Bow's Review, which was established three years later, in 1846. Indeed, the Southern Cultivator has been said to be "the Confederacy's oldest, strongest, and intellectually most impressive agricultural journal." Its editors were Dennis Redmond and Charles Wallace Howard. Its publisher was J. P. Harrison.

Southern Cultivator was published twice a month. After the American Civil War of 1861–1865, its offices moved to Athens, Georgia. It was then moved to Atlanta. It later absorbed other similar publications, including the Dixie Farmer. The title shifted over time to reflect these absorptions; it was known as The Southern Cultivator and Dixie Farmer from the 1880s until 1926, and as Southern Cultivator and Farming in 1926 and 1927, and once again as Southern Cultivator from 1928 to 1935. It was renamed Southern Farmer in 1935.

== Content ==
The primary readership of the journal was Southern planters. As a result, much of the content focused on agricultural matters. However, it also published articles about politics, education and literature. Indeed, the byline read, "Devoted to Southern Agriculture, Designed to improve the Mind, and Elevate the Characters of the Tillers of the Soil, and to Introduce a More Enlightened System of Culture.".

A large number of poems written by Confederate poets were published in its pages. They also described books published in the North as "evil." Moreover, author Bill Arp (1823-1906) had a monthly column in the journal. As the journal publisher, J. P. Harrison, also served as the publisher of Arp's books, the Southern Cultivator' also ran advertisements for those books.

Among its pages, some readers also discussed the recipe of mustang wine, a wine made from mustang grapes in Texas.

== Digitalization ==
It has been digitized by Duke University Libraries. Original copies are kept at the University of Illinois at Urbana–Champaign, Duke University, and Princeton University.
