= Mary Hunt (disambiguation) =

Mary Hunt (1830–1906) was an American activist in the United States temperance movement. Mary Hunt may also refer to:

- Mary E. Hunt (born 1951), American feminist theologian
- Mary Hunt Affleck (1847–1932), American agrarian poet
