= Geniocane people =

Former Indigenous tribe in Texas

The Geniocane people were a Native American tribe in the area of present-day Texas. They lived in an arroyo of the Edwards Plateau north of the Rio Grande, where they may have cultivated mustang grapes. Their name is also spelled Giniacane or Heniocane.

Juan Larios and [lFernando del Bosque encountered the Geniocane on a 1675 expedition. At that time, the Geniocane were at war with the Gueiquesale, and allied with the Bibits and Yoricas under a Bobole chief.
