= Tornadoes of 1983 =

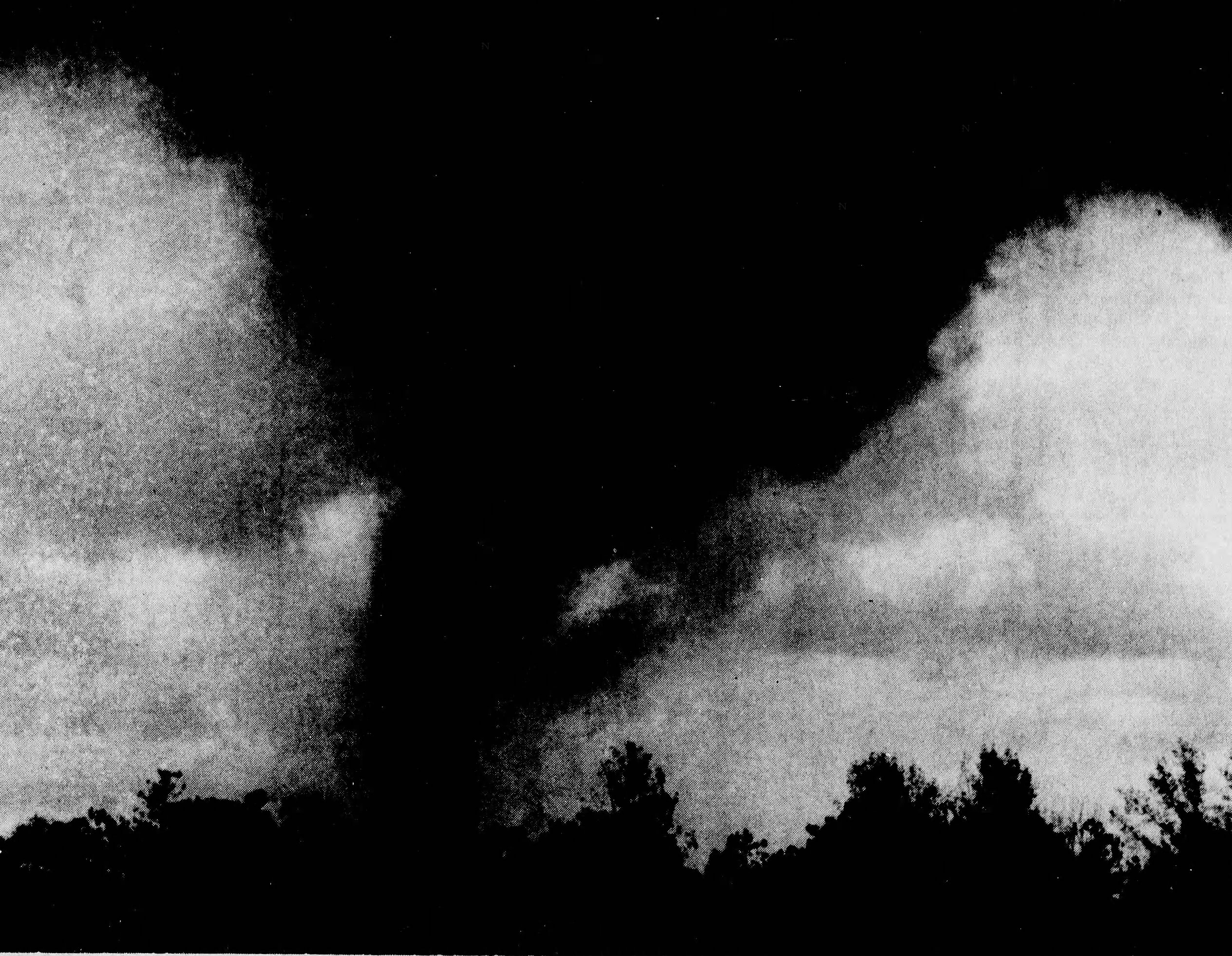
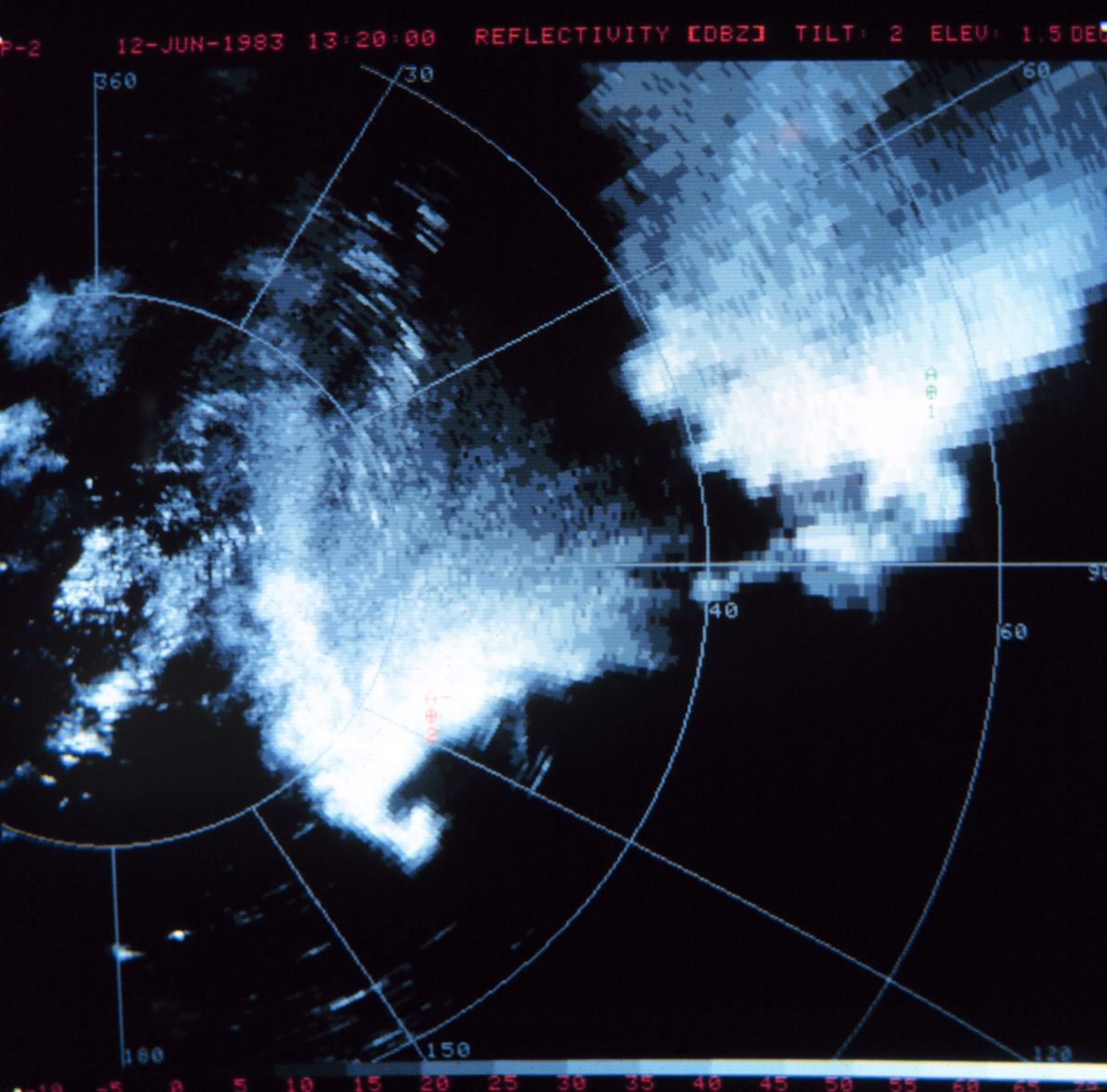
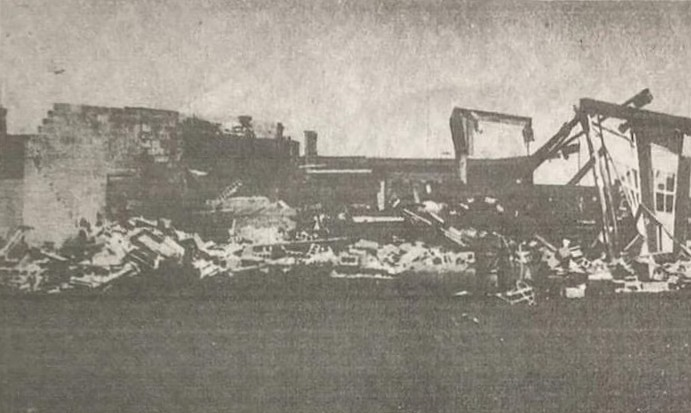
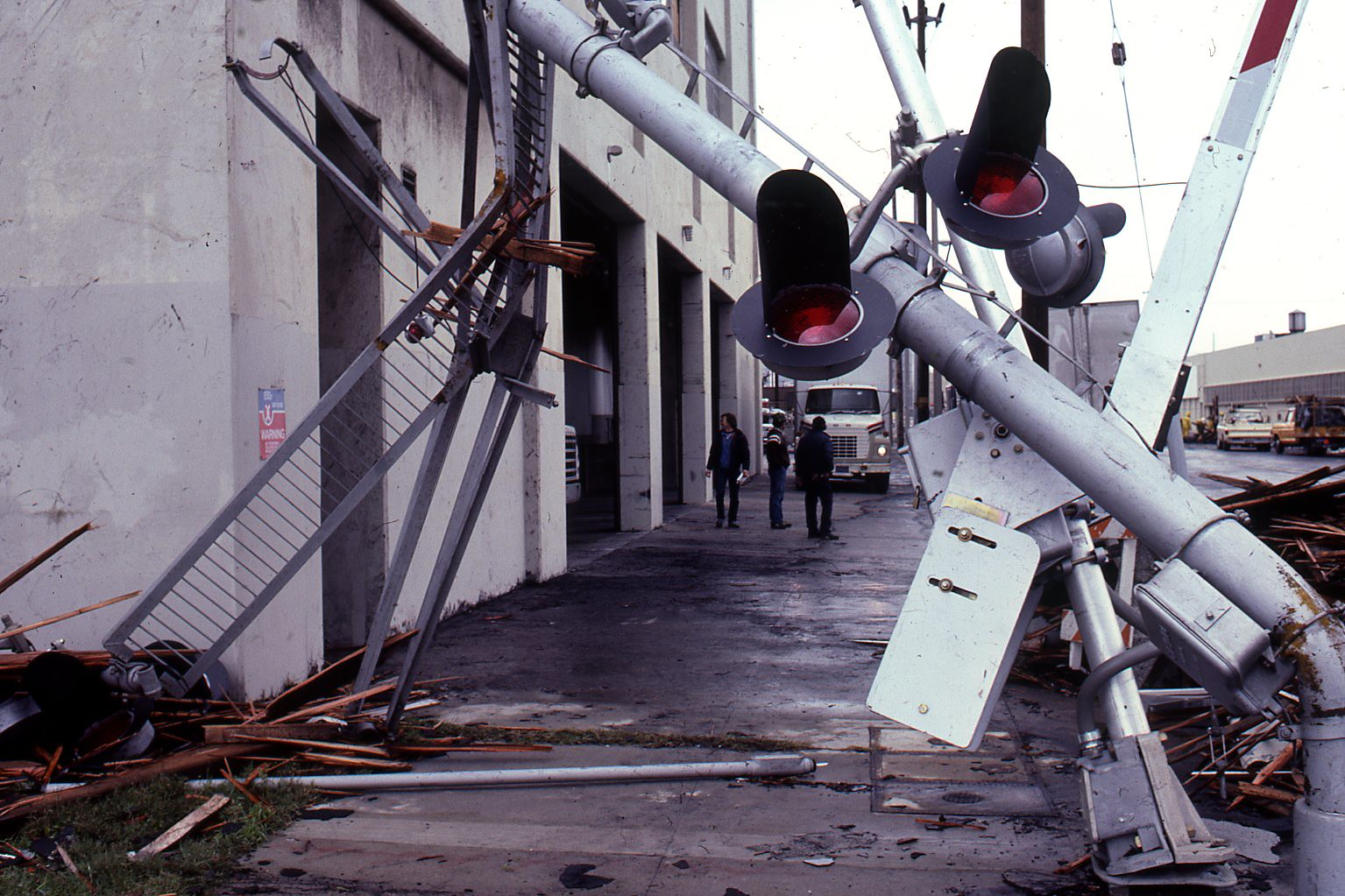
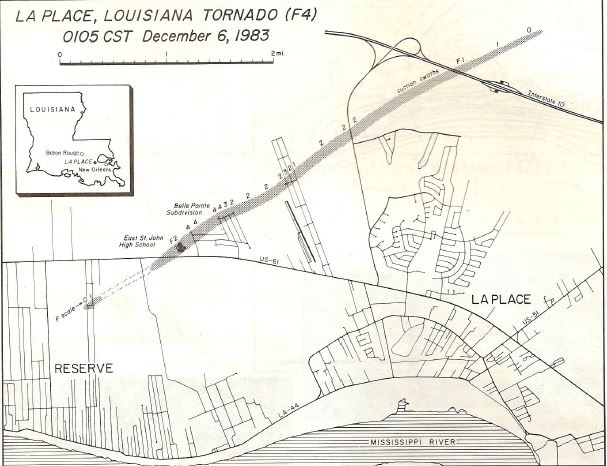
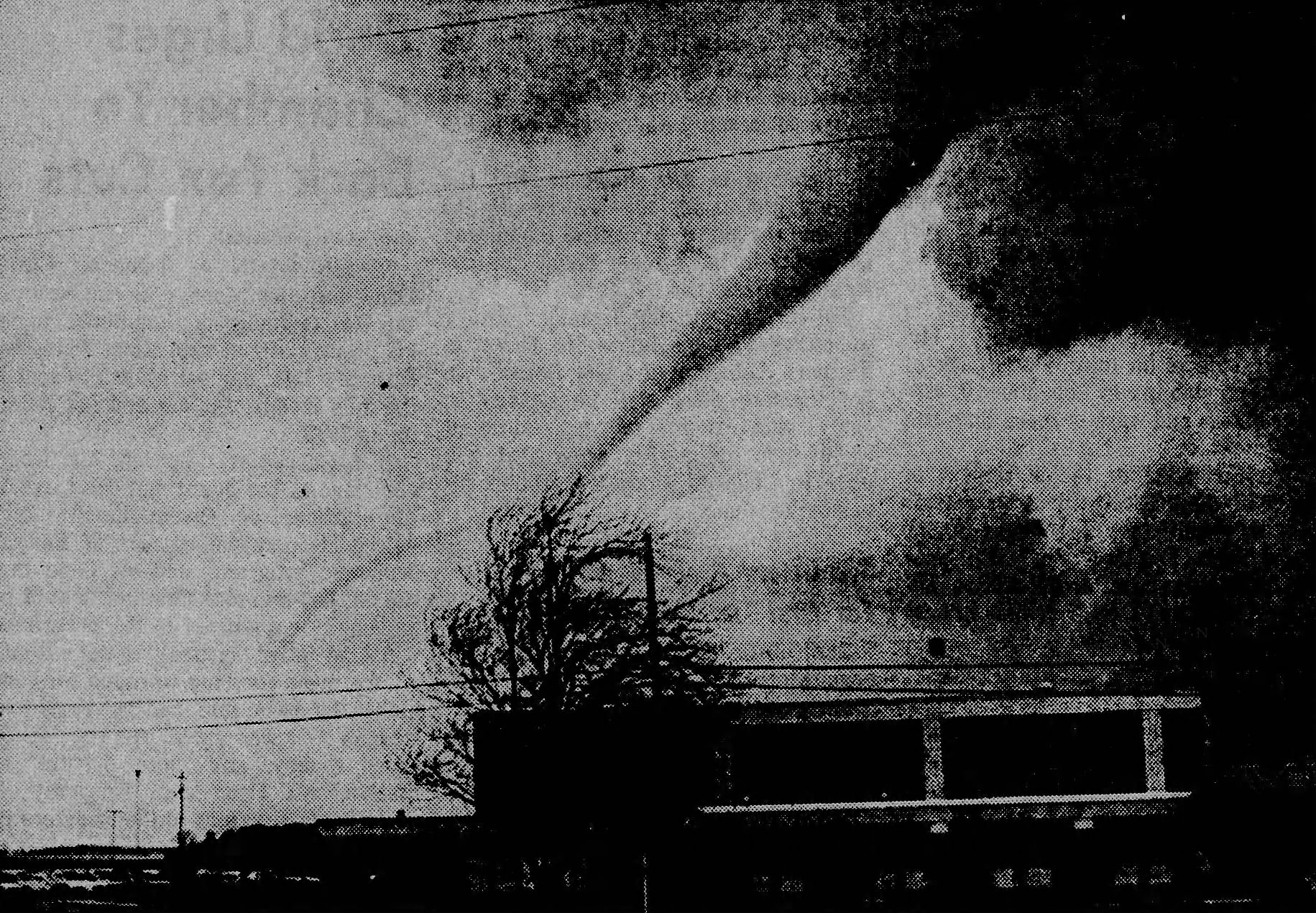
- Clockwise from top: A large F1 in northern Columbus, Georgia on November 20; A destroyed business north of Dodgeville, Wisconsin after an F4 tornado on July 3; A map showing the track of an F4 tornado that tracked through LaPlace, Louisiana on December 5; An F3 tornado that struck Weston, Ohio shortly after its formation on May 2; Damage in Los Angeles, California after an F2 tornado on March 1; A radar photo showing a supercell in far eastern Colorado on June 12.
- Timespan: January–December 1983
Maximum rated tornado
F4 tornado
- List
  – Collinston, Louisiana
  on April 1
  – Xiangyin County, China
  on April 27
  – Reece’s Corners, Ontario
  on May 2
  – Andover, Minnesota
  on July 3
  – Dodgeville, Wisconsin
  on July 3
  – LaPlace, Louisiana
  on December 6
- Tornadoes in U.S.: 931
- Damage (U.S.): >$65 million
- Fatalities (U.S.): ≥34
- Fatalities (worldwide): >96

This page documents the tornadoes and tornado outbreaks of 1983, in the United States. Most tornadoes form in the U.S., although some events may take place internationally. Tornado statistics for older years like this often appear significantly lower than modern years due to fewer reports or confirmed tornadoes.

== Synopsis ==
Fatal United States tornadoes in 1983
- Approximate touchdown location of killer tornadoes in 1983
Summary of tornadoes
- January 31 – Louisiana (1 death)
- January 31 – Louisiana (1 death)
- February 2 – Florida (1 death)
- April 1 – Louisiana (2 deaths)
- April 9 – Florida (3 deaths)
- April 29 – Missouri (1 death)
- May 1 – Illinois (2 deaths)
- May 2 – Ohio (1 death)
- May 2 – Ohio (1 death)
- May 2 – New York (2 deaths)
- May 2 – New York (1 death)
- May 6 – Kansas (1 death)
- May 19 – Louisiana (1 death)
- May 20 – Texas (1 death)
- May 20 – Texas (1 death)
- May 20 – Texas (1 death)
- May 20 – Texas (1 death)
- May 20 – Texas (1 death)
- June 9 – Texas (1 death)
- June 27 – Oklahoma (1 death)
- July 9 – Montana (1 death)
- July 21 – Delaware (2 deaths)
- July 21 – Michigan (1 death)
- December 3 – Alabama (2 deaths)
- December 6 – Alabama (1 death)
- December 10 – Texas (1 death)
- December 10 – Texas (1 death)
Total fatalities: 34

The 1983 season saw a relatively average number of tornadoes in the United States, but just four "violent" tornadoes (all F4) and the number killed by tornadoes, listed in official records was lower than average at just 34, and no tornado killed more than three people. However, local news media state that the Los Angeles tornado of March 1 killed nine people, even though none are listed in official records. Two notable outbreaks took place in May, but it was generally a much less destructive tornado season, particularly in the main tornado alley, which saw no tornadoes stronger than F3.

== Events ==
Confirmed tornado total for the entire year 1983 in the United States.

Confirmed tornadoes by Fujita rating
FU	F0	F1	F2	F3	F4	F5	Total
0	350	372	147	58	4	0	931

== January ==
There were 13 tornadoes confirmed in the US in January.

=== January 31 – February 2 ===
FU	F0	F1	F2	F3	F4	F5
0	2	8	6	3	0	0

A large upper-level trough that developed over New Mexico and produced a large storm complex that produced a blizzard in the north and severe weather in the south. Two people were killed in Louisiana in separate F3 tornadoes on January 31 and one person was killed by an F2 tornado in Florida, on February 2. A total of 33 tornadoes were confirmed in the outbreak.

== February ==
There were 41 tornadoes confirmed in the US in February.

=== February 9 - 10 ===
FU	F0	F1	F2	F3	F4	F5
0	3	5	3	1	0	0

A powerful winter storm swept across the United States, producing a small tornado outbreak of 12 tornadoes, primarily on Texas. A strong F2 struck southwestern Houston on Texas, damaging a carport and four warehouses, injuring three people. A multiple-vortex F3 tornado impacted the towns of Church Point and Courtableau in Louisiana. A church and several homes were demolished. Seven people were injured and the damage was estimated at $2,500,000 (1983 USD)

== March ==
There were 71 tornadoes confirmed in the US in March.

=== March 1 ===
An F2 tornado in Los Angeles, California hit just south of downtown, destroying property and causing 30 injuries, the highest number of tornado-related injuries in California history. While official records for this tornado list no fatalities, local news media have stated that nine people were killed.

=== March 17 ===
FU	F0	F1	F2	F3	F4	F5
0	0	1	1	0	0	0

A severe weather event struck South Florida. Although only two tornadoes were confirmed, there may have been at least five in the region and as many as 17 were reported. Two injuries were reported from the F2 tornado.

== April ==
There were 65 tornadoes confirmed in the US in April.

=== April 1 ===
Two were killed and 20 others were injured by an F4 tornado in Collinston, Louisiana. It was part of an outbreak that spawned 13 tornadoes.

=== April 3 (Vietnam) ===
A long-duration tornadic waterspout would impact several fishing village in Hải Châu district, Nghệ An province. 60 people would be killed, along an unknown injuries, mostly while on fishing trip.

=== April 9 ===
Three people were killed by an F3 tornado in Inverness, Florida.

=== April 23 ===
An F3 tornado tracked through Barnwell County, South Carolina without causing any fatalities.

=== April 27 (China) ===
A large, violent F4 tornado tore through Xiangyin County, Miluo City and Pingjiang County in Hunan province, China. 81 were killed and over 900 were injured by the tornado, which destroyed 2,600 homes and thousands of trees. Fish and shrimp were deposited in the nearby mountains.

=== April 29 ===
One person was killed by an F3 tornado in Springfield, Missouri.

== May ==
There were 249 tornadoes confirmed in the US in May, resulting in 14 fatalities.

=== May 1–2 (U.S. and Canada) ===
Two were killed by an F0 tornado in Illinois on May 1 and an F3 tornado in Linn, Missouri caused no fatalities. On May 2, five were killed by tornadoes in Ohio and New York, while outside the US, an F4 tornado in Reece's Corners, Ontario caused no fatalities.

=== May 12–23 ===
FU	F0	F1	F2	F3	F4	F5
0	60	48	33	16	0	0

At least four tornadoes were confirmed every day between May 12 and May 23, with 157 tornadoes confirmed over 12 days in a prolific tornado outbreak sequence.

The outbreak started on May 12, with eight tornadoes confirmed in Kansas, Oklahoma and northwestern Texas. Two of the tornadoes were rated F2, both of which occurred in southwestern Oklahoma near the towns of Mangum and Blair. The next day, 32 tornadoes were confirmed, primarily in Oklahoma. One of the tornadoes was rated F3, which occurred near Kingfisher. Another F2 tornado caused a significant injury south of Sulphur, Oklahoma that same day. On May 14, four tornadoes were confirmed. An F3 tornado directly hit the city of Pine Bluff, Arkansas causing two significant injuries. Four more tornadoes would be confirmed on May 15, including another F3 tornado which struck New Brockton, Alabama. Nine more tornadoes would be confirmed on May 16, as the first storm system moved into the Atlantic Ocean. On May 17, another storm system moved into the Great Plains yet again, producing tornadoes in Oklahoma, Kansas, and Colorado. An F2 tornado occurred just north of El Reno, Oklahoma that afternoon. On May 18, 21 tornadoes were confirmed, with Louisiana and Mississippi being the most affected. Two F3 tornadoes were confirmed in Louisiana, near the towns of Newellton and Tallulah. 26 tornadoes were confirmed on May 19, with multiple F3 tornadoes striking northern Louisiana. On May 20–21 a tornado outbreak struck Southeast Texas, killing five people, three in Harris County alone. On May 22, an F3 tornado touched down in Emmitsburg, Maryland, causing no deaths or injuries. It was the third recorded F3 tornado in Maryland history. On May 23, the last day of the outbreak sequence, four weak tornadoes were confirmed in Texas and Pennsylvania. In total, six fatalities occurred throughout the entire outbreak sequence.

== June ==
There were 178 tornadoes confirmed in the US in June and two fatalities, one in Texas the other in Oklahoma.

=== June 27 ===
A F2 tornado touched down on the north edge of Collinsville in Oklahoma, a trailer house was destroyed resulting in the death of a woman.

== July ==
There were 99 tornadoes confirmed in the US in July. An F3 tornado in Ocean County, New Jersey caused no fatalities or injuries while tornado–related fatalities were recorded in Michigan and Montana.

=== July 3 ===
An outbreak in the Upper Mississippi Valley resulted in 26 tornadoes, including two F4 tornadoes in Andover, Minnesota and Dodgeville, Wisconsin. There were no fatalities.

=== July 8 (Canada) ===
An F3 tornado hit the city of Lloydminster, Alberta and Saskatchewan, causing thousands of dollars' worth of damages and injuring one person.

=== July 21 ===
Two people were killed by an F2 tornado in Hartly, Delaware while nine others were injured. This was the only deadly tornado ever recorded in Delaware until an EF3 tornado killed a person in Sussex County on April 1, 2023.

== August ==
There were 76 tornadoes confirmed in the US in August.

=== August 2 (Italy and USSR) ===
FU	F0	F1	F2	F3	F4	F5
0	0	4	1	0	0	0

Four tornadoes struck Italy, killing two people and injuring two others, with a fifth tornado impacting the Soviet Union.

== September ==
There were 19 tornadoes confirmed in the US in September.

=== September 8 (Lithuanian Soviet Socialist Republic) ===
A significant tornado struck the town of Birzai, located in modern day Lithuania. The tornado had a maximum width of 200 metres (220 yd) and stayed on the ground for 6 kilometres (3.7 mi). The European Severe Storms Laboratory rated the tornado F2 with a note that a damage survey occurred by a severe weather expert, but gave no further information.

== October ==
There were 13 tornadoes confirmed in the US in October.

=== October 13 ===
An F2 tornado in Maryland touched down in St. Mary's County (near Hollywood) and tracked through Calvert County, dissipating near Broomes Island. It was the only significant tornado to hit St. Mary's County since tornado records began in 1950.

== November ==
There were 49 tornadoes confirmed in the US in November.

=== November 15 ===
A F3 tornado impacted areas around Cullman, Alabama, injuring 19 people. In Bolte, the tornado reached its peak width of 200 yards (180 m) as it flattened multiple homes, including a two-story brick home, where the basement was the only thing remaining. Further down the path, a frame-home was completely leveled.

== December ==
There were 58 tornadoes confirmed in the US in December.

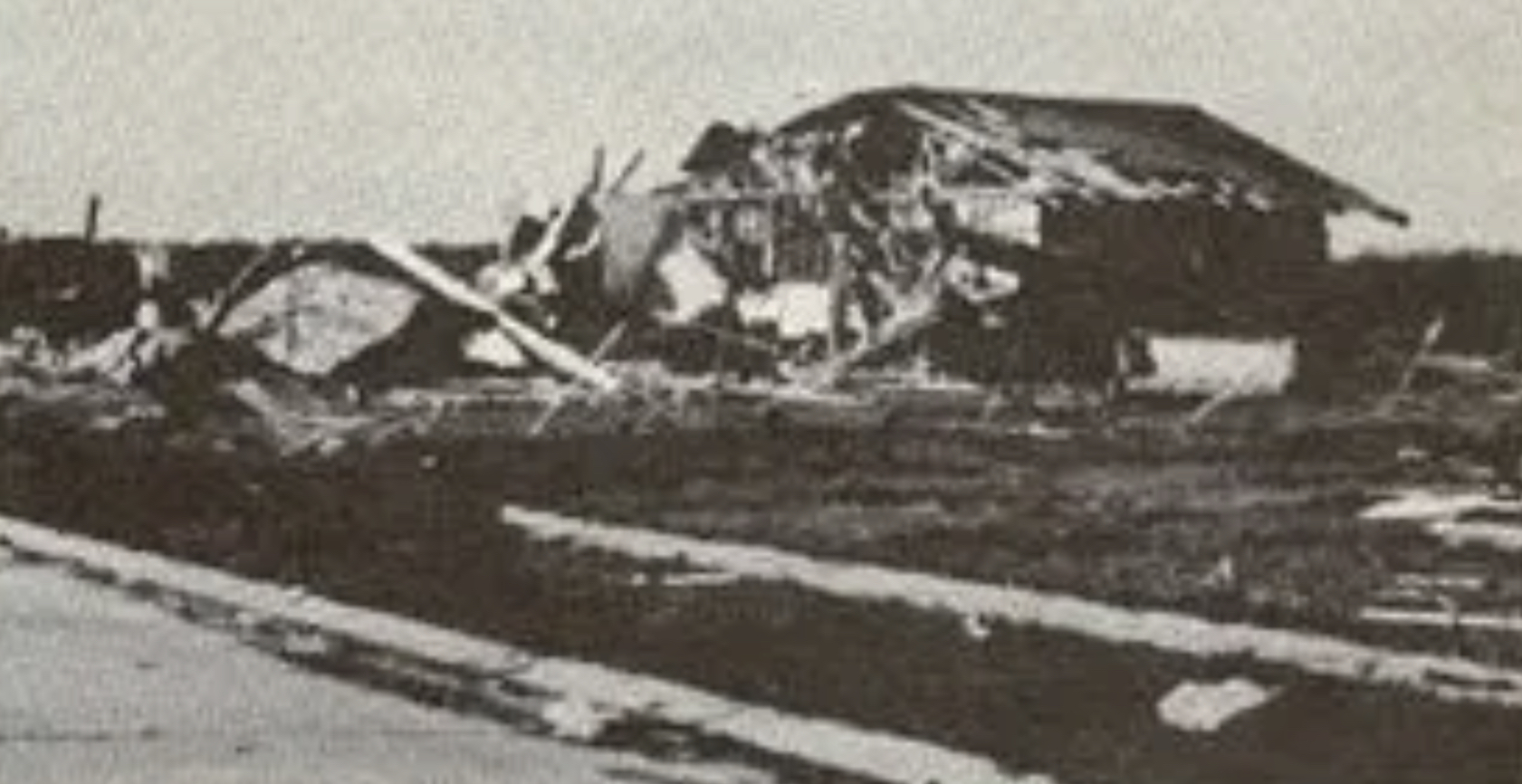
F4 damage to a destroyed home in LaPlace, Louisiana.

=== December 3 ===
Two were killed and 51 others were injured by an F3 tornado in Oxford, Alabama.

=== December 6 ===
Confirmed tornadoes by Fujita rating
FU	F0	F1	F2	F3	F4	F5	Total
0	?	?	?	1	1	0	0

An F3 tornado moved through part of Selma, Alabama, causing damage to the Selma University campus. One person died when the wall of an apartment caved in and nineteen others were injured. An F4 tornado struck LaPlace, Louisiana, where it destroyed 25-30 homes and injured 25 people. Several homes were wiped clean off their foundations, but they were not well-anchored, which precluded an F5 rating.

=== December 10 ===
A tornado caused fatalities in Independence, Texas.

== See also ==
- Tornado
  - Tornadoes by year
  - Tornado records
  - Tornado climatology
  - Tornado myths
- List of tornado outbreaks
  - List of F5 and EF5 tornadoes
  - List of North American tornadoes and tornado outbreaks
  - List of 21st-century Canadian tornadoes and tornado outbreaks
  - List of European tornadoes and tornado outbreaks
  - List of tornadoes and tornado outbreaks in Asia
  - List of Southern Hemisphere tornadoes and tornado outbreaks
  - List of tornadoes striking downtown areas
- Tornado intensity
  - Fujita scale
  - Enhanced Fujita scale
