= Old Gay Hill Red China =

Rose cultivar

- Genus: Rosa hybrid
- Marketing names: Old Gay Hill Red China
- Breeder: Thomas Affleck
- Origin: Washington County, Texas, 1800s

Rosa 'Old Gay Hill Red China', also known as 'Old Gay Hill', is a triploid red and white China rose cultivar found in Gay Hill, Washington County, Texas.

== History ==
This cultivar was likely grown originally by Thomas Affleck (1812–1868), a Scottish-American plantation owner, nurseryman, and almanac editor, at Glenblythe Plantation. It was found and reintroduced by Mike Shoup of the Antique Rose Emporium of Brenham, Texas. Based on genetic sequencing, 'Old Gay Hill China Red' is a taller growth form sport of China rose cultivar 'Fabvier'.

== Description ==
'Old Gay Hill Red China' grows as a dense, bushy shrub, reaching 4 to 6 feet (1.2 to 1.8 meters) in height with 2 to 4 feet (.6 to 1.2 meters) of spread. It produces bright, scarlet-red, semi-double roses with pale yellow-gold stamens that are 2 inches across (5 centimeters) and it blooms throughout the year. It is resistant to disease and pests, and hardy from USDA zone 6b through 10b. It has a light, fruity fragrance. The foliage can acquire a dark, bronze-green color in cold temperatures.
