= John Fontaine =

American politician (1792–1866)

- Born: 1792
- Died: 1866 (aged 73–74)
- Occupations: Planter, politician
- Spouse: Mary Ann (Stewart) Fontaine

John Fontaine (1792–1866) was an American plantation owner and politician. He served as the first mayor of Columbus, Georgia, from 1836 to 1837. He defended Columbus during the Creek War of 1836.

== Early life ==
Fontaine was born in 1792.

== Career ==
Fontaine was a steamboat owner and cotton merchant. He was also a large plantation owner.

He served as the first mayor of Columbus, Georgia, from 1836 to 1837. He defended the town during the Creek War of 1836, with the help of Governor William Schley. He used Creek informants to spy and report on their planned attacks.

=== Personal life ===
He married Mary Ann (Stewart) Fontaine (1808–1852). They had six children:

- Henrietta Fontaine (1827–1857)
- Mary Elizabeth Fontaine (1835-unknown)
- Benjamin Bruton Fontaine (1838–1870)
- Theophilus Fontaine (1842–1896)
- Francis Fontaine (1844–1901)
- George H. Fontaine (1850–1904)

=== Death ===
Fontaine died in 1866.

== Legacy ==
His son, Francis Fontaine, who inherited and managed his plantations, became a newspaper editor, poet and novelist.

His portrait, painted by Edward Ludlow Mooney (1813–1887), can be found at the Columbus Museum in Columbus, Georgia.
