= Seward Plantation =

Historic house in Texas, United States

- U.S. National Register of Historic Places
- U.S. Historic district
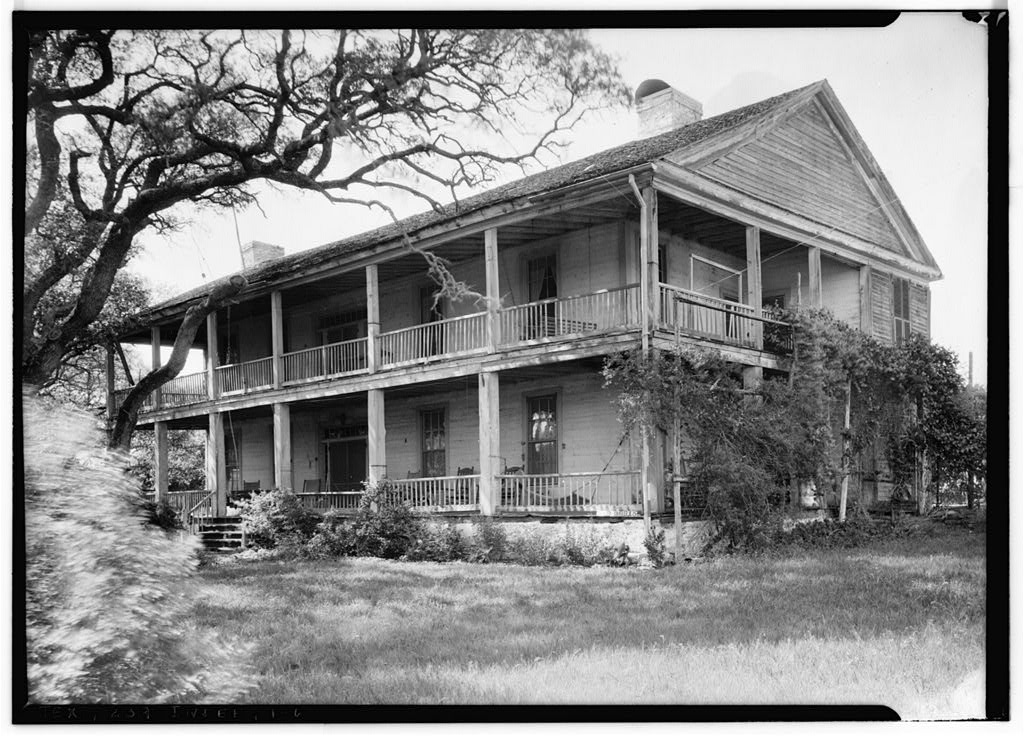
- John H. Seward House

- Location within Texas Location within the United States
- Interactive map showing the location of Seward Plantation
- Location: 10005 FM 390 E, Independence, Texas
- Coordinates: 30°19′46″N 96°19′56″W
- Area: approx. 60 acres (24 ha)
- Built: 1855
- Built by: John H. Seward
- Architectural style: Greek Revival
- NRHP reference No.: 12001250
- Added to NRHP: January 29, 2013

The Seward Plantation is a historic site built in 1855, a Southern plantation-turned-ranch located in Independence, Texas. The Seward Plantation has been listed on the National Register of Historic Places since January 29, 2013. It was documented as part of the Historical American Buildings Survey. It has a Texas Centennial Marker.

== Location ==
The plantation is located one mile (1.6 km) east of Independence near Brenham in Washington County, Texas. It is off Farm to Market Road 390, also known as La Bahía Road (later Old Washington Road). The La Bahia Road was originally an east-west Indian trail also used by Spanish explorers in the 17th century. One can still see remnants of the La Bahia Road on the Seward Plantation.

== History ==
Between 1832 and 1833, Samuel Seward (1794–1870) moved from Illinois to Mexican Texas with Stephen F. Austin. Seward purchased 1,700 acres (690 ha) of land, then 300 acres (120 ha) more.

In the 1850s, after Texas had become a state, the land passed to his son, John Hoblett Seward (1822–1892). John Seward was married Laura Jane Roberts (1838–1920) of Houston. The main house on the plantation was built in 1855.

The plantation house was originally built as a one-story building 1/4 mile from Sam Seward's house. One year after its completion the house was rolled on large cottonwood logs 3/4th of a mile, to its current location because the original location was found to be inaccessible during the rainy seasons and unhealthful during the cold seasons. The house was constructed almost entirely from cedar trees growing within sight of the original location. It sits securely on a stone base. The Seward family added a second story soon after the house was moved, and made other additions through the years. After it was enlarged, the plantation home became the largest house in Washington County. The property also included barns, log cabins for slaves, a smokehouse, a corn crib and a blacksmith's shop, many of which are still standing.

It was used as a cotton plantation prior to the American Civil War of 1861 to 1865. After the war, it became a cattle ranch.

The house survived the storm of 1900. The Seward Plantation remained in the Seward family until 2017, when it was purchased by a family from Houston who is restoring the property and using the house as a private home.

== See also ==
- National Register of Historic Places listings in Washington County, Texas
