= Francis Fontaine =

American poet (1845–1901)

- Born: May 7, 1845; Columbus, Georgia, U.S.
- Died: May 3, 1901 (aged 55); Atlanta, Georgia, U.S.
- Resting place: Lindwood Cemetery
- Education: Georgia Military Institute
- Occupations: Planter; newspaper editor; poet; novelist
- Spouses: Mary Flournoy; Nathalie Hamilton
- Children: 1 son, 1 daughter
- Parent(s): John Fontaine; Mary Ann Stewart

Francis Fontaine (May 7, 1845 – May 3, 1901) was an American Confederate soldier, plantation owner, newspaper editor, poet and novelist from the state of Georgia.

== Early life ==
Francis Fontaine was born on May 7, 1845, in Columbus, Georgia. His father, John Fontaine (1792–1866), had served as the mayor of Columbus from 1836 to 1837, and he was a planter. His mother was Mary Ann Stewart. He was educated at the Georgia Military Institute in Marietta, Georgia.

During the American Civil War of 1861–1865, he joined the Confederate States Army and served as a private and aide-de-camp. He fought at the Battle of Peachtree Creek.

== Career ==
After the war, Fontaine inherited his father's plantations and managed them, becoming a planter in his own right.

In 1874, Fontaine co-founded The Columbus Times, a newspaper in his hometown of Columbus, Georgia. He then served as a state diplomat, encouraging European immigration to the state of Georgia. In 1877, he was elected to a convention to write the new state constitution.

In 1878, his poem entitled The Exile: A Tale of St. Augustine was published by G.P. Putnam's Sons. The theme of the poem was the massacre of Huguenots by Spanish forces in Florida in 1565. The poem received negative reviews from The New York Times and the Evening Post. He went on to publish three novels, including Etowah: A Romance of the Confederacy, which received good reviews from critics.

== Personal life and death ==
Fontaine married Mary Flournoy in 1870, and they had a son and a daughter. In 1885, he remarried to Nathalie Hamilton. They resided in Atlanta, Georgia.

Fontaine died in Atlanta, Georgia on May 3, 1901, at the age of 55. He was buried at Linwood Cemetery in Columbus, Georgia.

== Bibliography ==
=== Poetry ===
- The Exile: A Tale of St. Augustine (G.P. Putnam's Sons, 1878).

=== Non-fiction ===
- The State of Georgia: What It Offers to Immigrants, Capitalists, Producers and Manufacturers, and Those Desiring to Better their Condition (1881).

=== Novels ===
- Etowah: A Romance of the Confederacy (1887).
- Amanda, the Octoroon (J. P. Harrison, 1891).
- The Modern Pariah: A Story of the South (1892).
