= Live Oak Female Seminary =

Malk Hormiz Chko

- Type: Female seminary
- Active: 1853–1888
- President: James Weston Miller
- Location: Gay Hill, Texas, USA; 30.2664°N 97.7272°W

Live Oak Female Seminary was a Presbyterian female seminary and boarding school in Gay Hill, Washington County, Texas from 1853 to 1888. Many daughters of the Southern aristocracy were educated here.

== History ==
It was founded by Presbyterian minister James Weston Miller (1815-1888) in February 1853. Miller served as Superintendent, Chaplain, and Teacher of Latin, French, Greek, and Moral Philosophy. His second wife and first cousin, Elizabeth Scott Stuart, was in charge of boarding arrangements. Her sister, Rebecca Stuart, was Principal and Teacher of English, History, Science, and Mathematics. After she got married, her husband, George Clark Red, a physician, became the laboratory instructor and Teacher of Science and Mathematics. Other subjects included art and music as well as embroidery, home economics and the Bible.

There were about sixty boarders and fifty day students. While primarily a female seminary, Miller's sons were educated here. Many of the students belonged to what came to be known as the Southern aristocracy. For example, the mother of the Chairman of the Board of Regents of Texas A&M University Edward Benjamin Cushing, Matilda Burke, was educated here. Moreover, the daughters of three first judges on the Texas Supreme Court were also educated here: Betty Lipscomb and Lucy Lipscomb, daughters of Judge Abner Smith Lipscomb; Emily Wheeler, daughter of Judge Royall T. Wheeler; and Elizabeth Hemphill, daughter of Judge John Hemphill. Moreover, the nieces and grandnieces of Judge Robert Emmett Bledsoe Baylor, who lived on a farm across from the seminary, attended Live Oak. Anne Giddings, later the wife of J. N. Brown, the President of Alamo National Bank, and the mother of Clinton Giddings Brown, the Mayor of San Antonio, Texas, was also educated here.

During the American Civil War of 1861–1865, the school remained open. However, Miller's wife and sister-in-law stopped teaching at the school. Miller served as a Confederate chaplain under Brigadier General Thomas Neville Waul. The school was resumed properly at the end of the war in 1865, although his sister-in-law had left for Austin, Texas, where they established the Stuart Seminary. Nevertheless, the school was operational and Miller's three daughters taught there.

The school closed down shortly after Miller's death, in 1888.
