= J. P. Harrison =

American publishing house based in Atlanta, Georgia

J. P. Harrison is a former American publishing house based in Atlanta, Georgia.

== Overview ==
The publishing house, masterminded by James P. Harrison, published the Southern Cultivator, the oldest Confederate agrarian journal in the Antebellum South. It also published the books of one of its contributors, Southern author Bill Arp (1823-1906). Additionally, it published the 1885 novel Psyche, written by Georgian author Odessa Strickland Payne.

Some of the books it published dealt with the state of Georgia. In 1877, it published Journal of the Constitutional convention of the people of Georgia held in the city of Atlanta in the months of July and August, 1877. A year later, in 1878, it published Catalogue of Ores, Rocks and Woods, which focused on the geology and flora of Georgia. Two years later, in 1880, it published J. Norcross's Democracy Examined, which dealt with politics in Georgia. Yet another book, written in 1884, was published by the Harrison: entitled The Commonwealth of Georgia: The County, the People, the Productions, it was written by J. T. Henderson, who served as the Georgia Commissioner of Agriculture. The same year, in published Charles Colcock Jones's The life and services of ex-Governor Charles Jones Jenkins and Catalogue of the Young Men's Library of Atlanta. Additionally, in 1892, it published Charles Edgeworth Jones's Political and Judicial Divisions of the Commonwealth of Georgia.

Some of its books dealt with race. For example, in 1877, it published The Negro Problem: An Essay on the Industrial, Political and Moral Aspects of the Negro Race in Southern States, written by J. R. Ralls. Three years later, in 1880, it published The Education of the Negro, written by the Southern educator Gustavus Orr. Nine years later, in 1889, it published Whites and black or, The question settled, written by the African-American diplomat C.H.J. Taylor. Two years later, in 1891, it published Francis Fontaine's Amanda, the Octoroon.

Other books dealt with Christianity, especially Presbyterian or Calvinist themes. For example, in 1878, it published The Discipline of Dancing: A Review of the Block Case, and of the Sermons of Rev. J.T. Leftwich, D.D., written by J. W. Kerr.
