= Waul's Legion =

Texan Confederate combined arms force

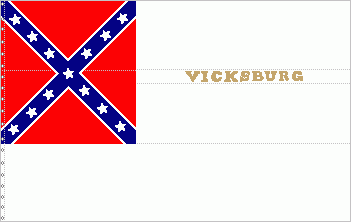
Flag of Waul's Legion

Waul's Legion was a combined arms force from Texas that fought for the Confederate States of America during the American Civil War. Raised in the spring of 1862 at the Glenblythe Plantation near Gay Hill, Washington County, Texas by Brigadier General Thomas Neville Waul, the legion originally consisted of twelve infantry companies, six cavalry companies, and a six-gun battery of artillery.

Waul's Legion participated in the Battle of Vicksburg as part of Lt. Gen. John C. Pemberton's Army of Mississippi.

== Waul's Legion at Vicksburg ==
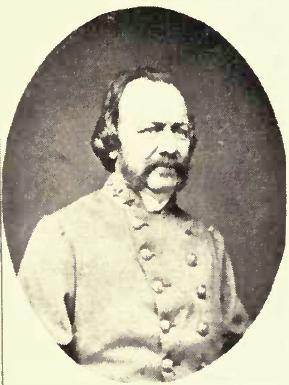
Brig. Gen. Thomas N. Waul

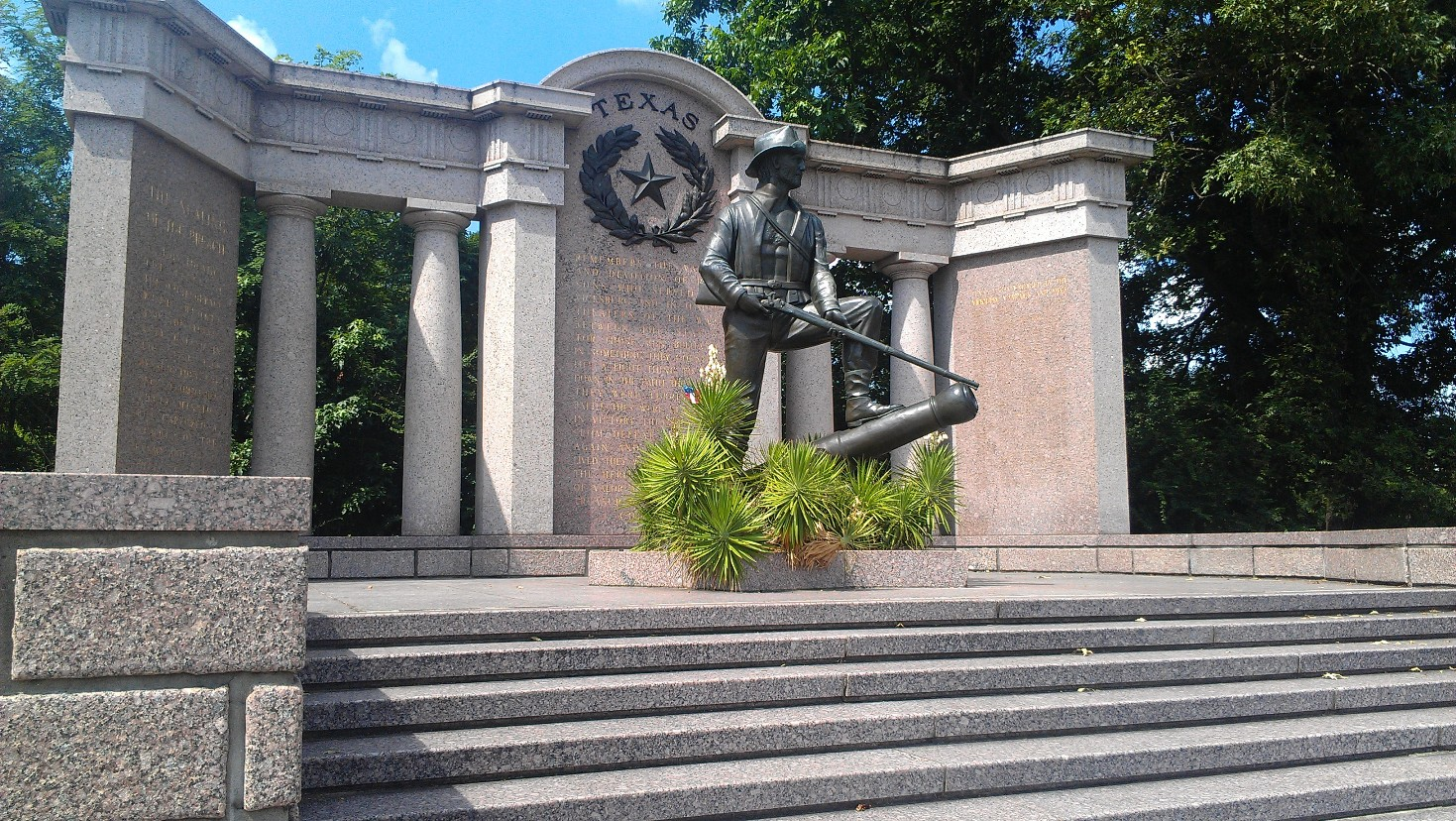
Waul's Texas Legion Monument, Vicksburg National Military Park

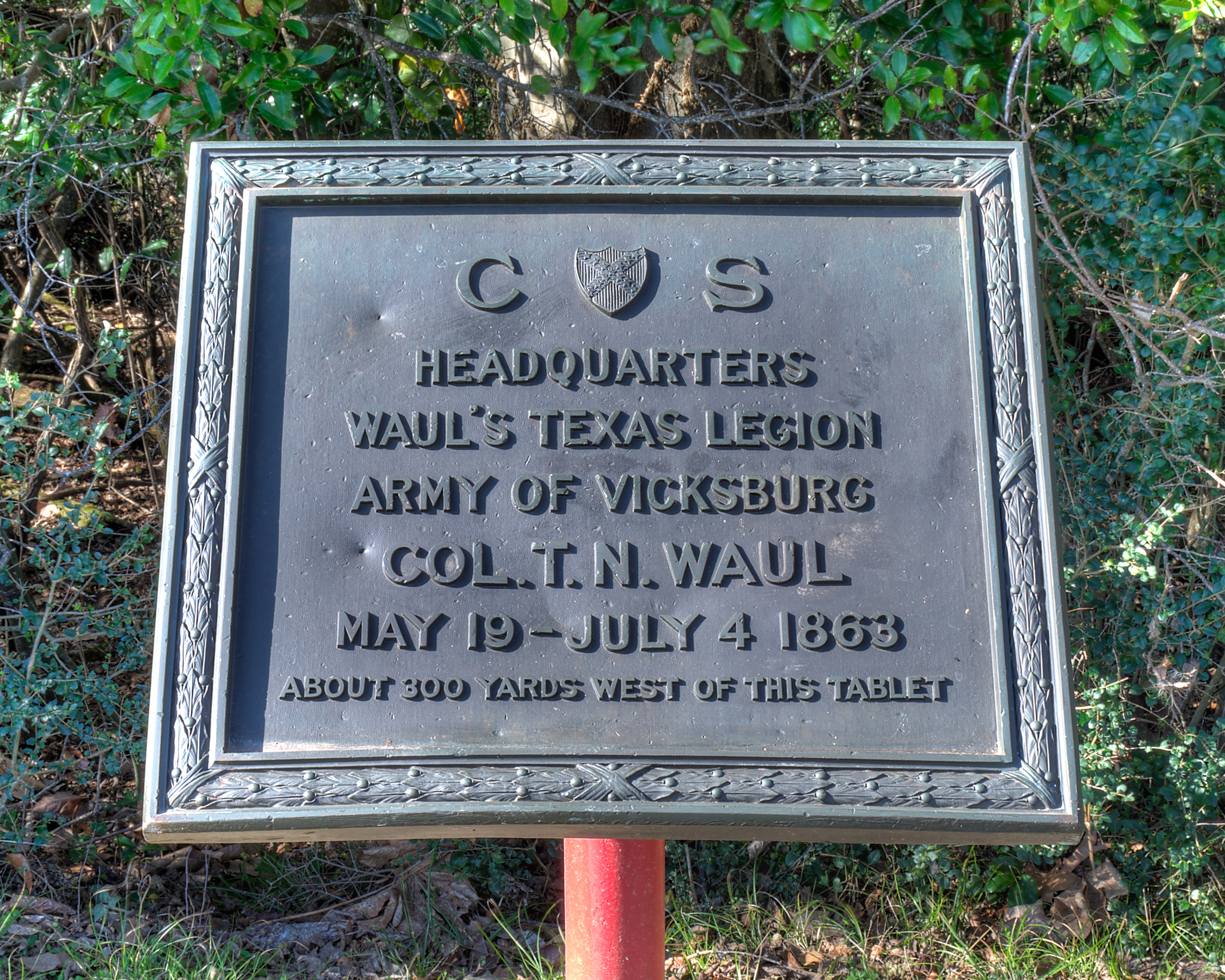
Unit position marker at Vicksburg National Military Park

Waul's Texas Legion is known for repelling the Union Army breach of Confederate lines during Ulysses S. Grant's largest and final organized assault on the "Fortress City" of Vicksburg, on May 22, 1863. After Union troops, most notably the 77th Illinois, under the command of John Alexander McClernand, successfully penetrated the Confederate defenses, McClernand urged Grant to follow with his own assault. Unsure of the accuracy of the message, Grant failed to act. Waul's Legion, seeing the Union breach, rushed in. After hours of intense hand-to-hand combat, the Legion put the Union troops to flight and captured two Union banners which had been placed on the fortress parapets. By the time Grant realized there had been a definitive breach of the enemy fortifications, it was too late; Waul's Texas Legion had saved the day. The angered Grant, believing McClernand had recklessly chased glory and thus caused an unnecessary loss of Union soldiers, relieved the politician-general from his post.

As this was the second failed assault to capture Vicksburg by storm, Grant decided to starve the Army of Mississippi into submission. After 47 days cut off from food and supplies, the defenders of Vicksburg were forced to surrender to Grant's Army of the Tennessee on July 4, 1863.

Composition of Waul's Legion at Vicksburg:

- 1st Infantry Battalion: Maj. Eugene S. Bolling
- 2nd Infantry Battalion: Lt. Col. James Wrigley
- The Zouave Battalion: Capt. J.B. Fleitas
- Artillery Battery: Capt. John Q. Wall
- Cavalry Detachment: Lt. Thomas J. Cleveland
- Attached companies:
  - Company C, 1st Tennessee Cavalry: Capt. Richard S. Vandyke
  - Botetourt Virginia Artillery: Capt. John W. Johnston, Lt. Francis G. Obenchain
  - Signal Corps Detachment: Lt. C.H. Barrott

== See also ==
- Texas Civil War Confederate Units
- List of American Civil War legions
