= Mary Hunt Affleck =

American poet

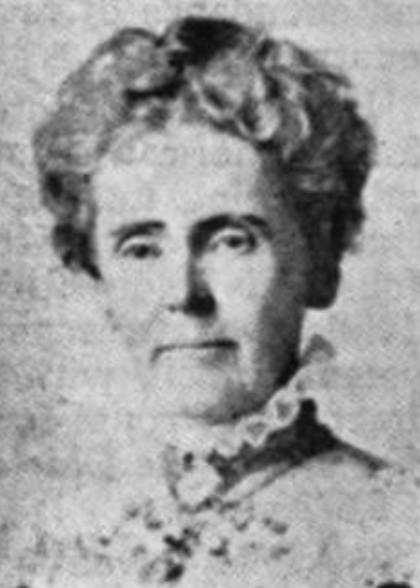
- Mary Hunt Affleck, from a 1919 publication
- Born: Mary Hunt; January 20, 1847; Danville, Kentucky
- Died: November 28, 1932 (aged 85); Galveston, Texas
- Occupation: Poet
- Spouse: Isaac Dunbar Affleck
- Children: 3
- Parent(s): James Anderson Hunt; Anna (Adair) Hunt
- Relatives: Thomas Affleck (father-in-law)

Mary Hunt Affleck (January 20, 1847 – November 28, 1932) was an American agrarian poet from Texas and a supporter of the Confederate States of America.

== Early life ==
Mary Hunt was born on January 20, 1847, in Danville, Kentucky. Her father was James Anderson Hunt and her mother, Anna (Adair) Hunt. She graduated from Harrodsburg Female College in Harrodsburg, Kentucky. She moved to Burleson County, Texas in 1874.

== Career ==
Affleck worked as a poet, focusing on agrarian themes. Her poems were widely published in Texas newspapers.

She was a member of the Daughters of the American Revolution, the United Daughters of the Confederacy, the United States Daughters of 1812, and the Texas Editorial Association. She served as chairwoman of the textbook committee for the Texas division of the United Daughters of the Confederacy. In this role, she encouraged other members to focus on selecting schoolbooks that portrayed the Confederacy positively in their content surrounding the American Civil War. In 1910, she gave a speech at the dedication of a Confederate monument in honor of Hood's Texas Brigade in Austin, Texas.

== Personal life and death ==
She married Isaac Dunbar Affleck (1844–1919), the son of planter Thomas Affleck (1812–1868). They had three children. They lived in Washington County, Texas.

Affleck died on November 28, 1932, in Galveston, Texas.
