= Hugh Wilson (Presbyterian minister) =

American Presbyterian missionary and minister

- Born: March 16, 1794; North Carolina
- Died: March 8, 1868 (aged 73); Lee County, Texas
- Education: Princeton University; Princeton Theological Seminary; Austin College
- Occupation: Clergyman
- Spouse(s): Ethalinda Hall (m. 1822; died 1856) Elizabeth Loughridge Reid (m. 1856)
- Children: 4

Hugh Wilson (1794–1868) was an American Presbyterian missionary and minister. He founded some of the first Presbyterian churches in Texas.

== Biography ==
=== Early life ===
Hugh Wilson was born on March 16, 1794, in North Carolina. He graduated from Princeton University and received a master's degree from the Princeton Theological Seminary in Princeton, New Jersey. He later received a Doctor of Divinity from Austin College in Huntsville, Texas.

=== Career ===
From 1822 to 1832, he served as a Presbyterian missionary to the Chickasaws. He then served as a Presbyterian minister in Tennessee from 1832 to 1837. In the summer of 1837, he visited Texas for the first time. Shortly after, in the spring of 1838, he moved to San Augustine, Texas. On June 2, 1838, he founded Bethel Presbyterian Church, four miles west of San Augustine. It is now known as the Memorial Presbyterian Church and has been relocated to San Augustine. From 1838 to 1840, he taught and served as an administrator at Independence Female Academy, a women's college in Independence, Texas.

In 1839, he founded the Mount Prospect Presbyterian Church in what was then known as Chriesman Settlement (later known as Gay Hill, Washington County, Texas). It was the second oldest Presbyterian church in Texas. He also helped organize the Brazos Presbytery the following year, inviting Presbyterians from all over the country to convene in Chriesman Settlement.

When the Texas House of Representatives met in Washington-on-Brazos in 1844, he served as its chaplain. Two years later, in 1846, he served as a Presbyterian minister in four several churches, within a radius of 100 miles. Meanwhile, he also helped establish Austin College, first located in Huntsville, Texas (it later moved to Sherman, Texas).

In 1850, he moved to Lee County, Texas. Two years later, in 1852, he founded the String Prairie Church, where he served as the pastor until his death.

=== Personal life ===
He married Ethalinda Hall on June 12, 1822. She died in 1856. Later that year, he got remarried to Elizabeth Loughridge Reid. He had four daughters.

=== Death ===
He died on March 8, 1868, in Lee County, Texas. He was buried near Tanglewood in Lee County, Texas.

== Secondary source ==
- Edward M. Browder. A Pioneer Presbyterian Preacher in Texas, the Rev. Hugh Wilson. The Texas Presbyterian. 1916.
