= Independence, Texas =

Independence
- Unincorporated community
- Location within the state of Texas Independence (the United States)
- Coordinates: 30°19′10″N 96°20′48″W
- Country: United States
- State: Texas
- County: Washington
- Elevation: 358 ft (109 m)
- GNIS feature ID: 1338384

Independence is an unincorporated community in Washington County, Texas, United States. According to the Handbook of Texas, the community had a population of 140 in 2000. It is located about an hour northwest of the Greater Houston metropolitan area.

== History ==
Its population was reported as 140 in 2010.

Milam Lodge No. 11, of the Grand Lodge of Texas, was located in the community. Seward Plantation is listed on the National Register of Historic Places.

A tornado hit Independence in December 1983. On May 26, 2016, an EF0 tornado struck Independence, in which numerous trees were downed in a convergent pattern.

== Geography ==
Independence is located at the intersection of Farm to Market Roads 390 and 50, 12 mi (19 km) northeast of Brenham and 82 mi (132 km) west of Houston in northeastern Washington County.

== Education ==
Today, the community is served by the Brenham Independent School District, located in Brenham, Texas. The 2 towns are 12 miles away from each other, making transit to the school very easy.

== Notable people ==
- George Washington Baines, a co-founder and president of Baylor; great-grandfather of Lyndon B. Johnson
- Jerome B. Robertson
- William Bizzell
- Sam Houston Jr.
- Lawrence Sullivan Ross, 19th Governor of Texas, attended Baylor University.
- Andrew Jackson Houston, son of Sam and Margaret Lea Houston and politician.
- George W. Littlefield, Confederate Army soldier, attended Baylor University.
- Thomas Chilton, U.S. Representative from Kentucky, co-founded Baylor University.
- Robert Emmett Bledsoe Baylor is buried in the community's cemetery.
- Martin Varner, Old Three Hundred member
- William Carey Crane, Baptist minister who preached at Independence Baptist Church from 1864 to 1867 and 1869 to 1884.
- Hosea Garrett, clergyman and philanthropist, who served as President Pro tempore at Baylor.
- Henry Arthur McArdle, painter
- Hugh Wilson, Presbyterian minister, who served as an administrator at Independence Female College.
- Royall T. Wheeler, judge who became Chief Justice of the Texas Supreme Court.
- Edward Taylor, brother of Horace D. Taylor, built a store in Independence in 1838.
- Nancy Moffette Lea, mother of Margaret Lea Houston, moved here in 1852.
- Antoinette Power Houston Bringhurst, the fifth child of Houston and Lea, got her education at Baylor Female College.
- George Wythe Baylor, Confederate soldier.
- Henry Weidner Baylor, physician and Texas Ranger.

== In popular culture ==
American western TV series Walker: Independence takes place in Independence.

== Gallery ==
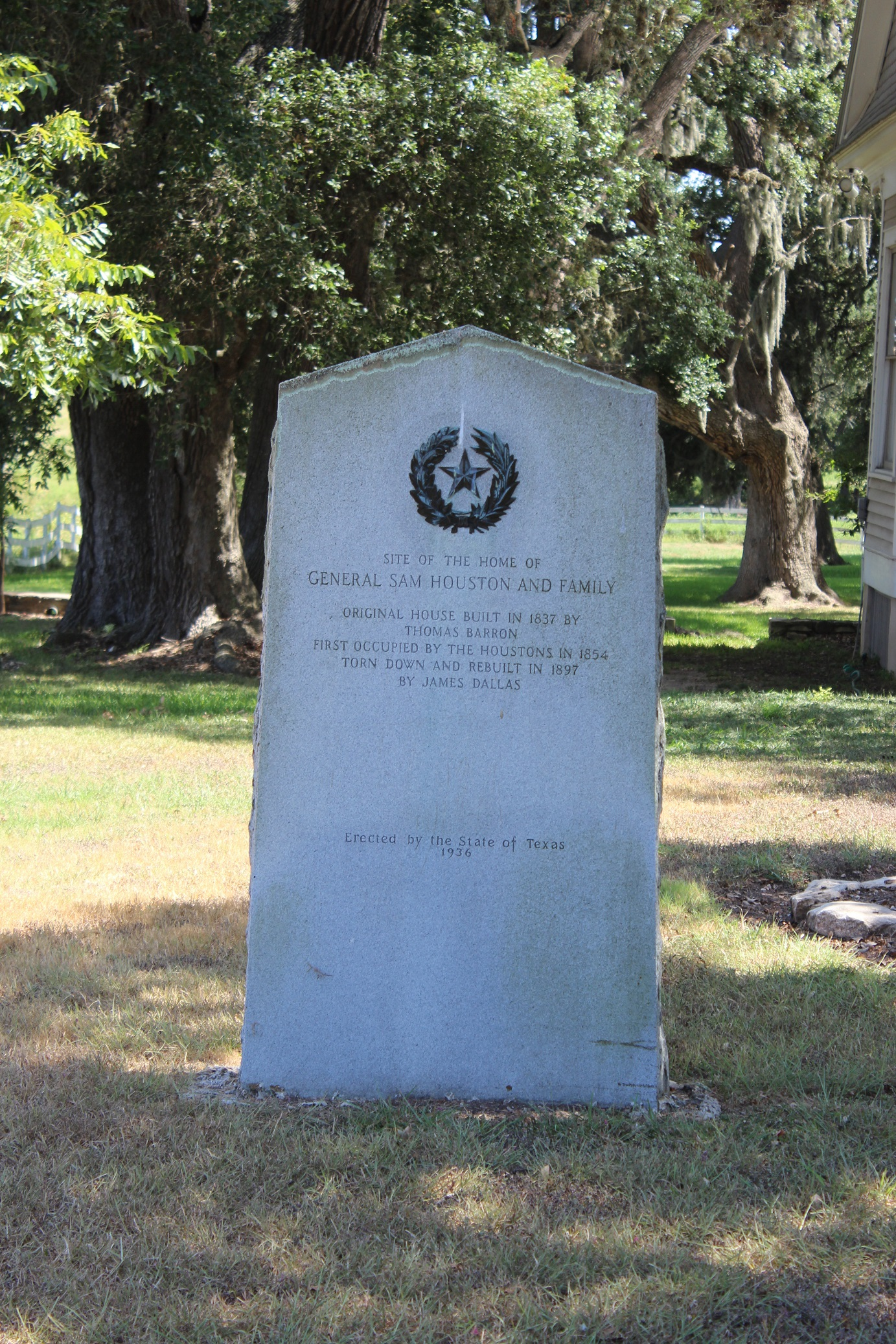
Site of Home of General Sam Houston and Family

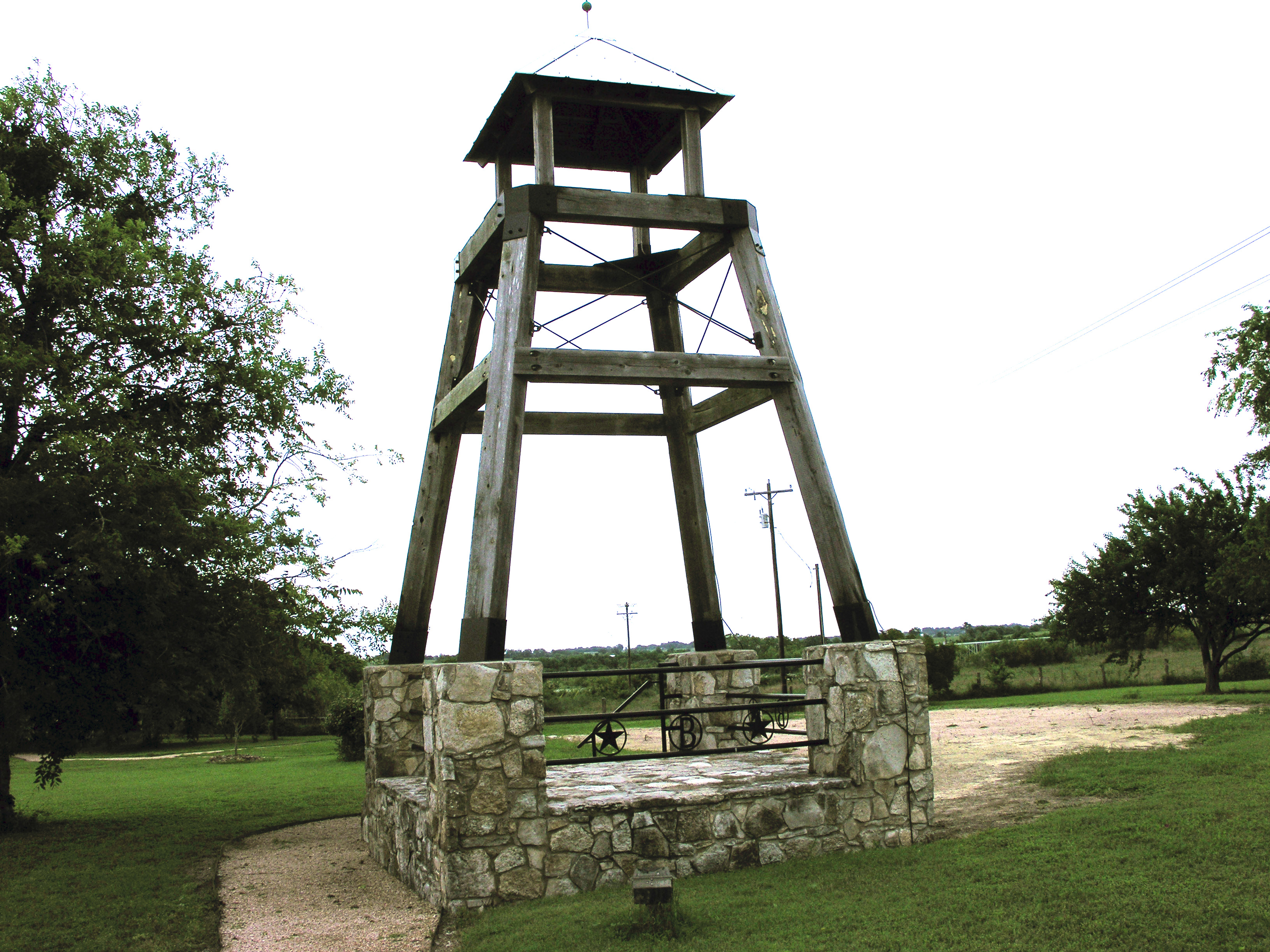
Original Site of Baylor University

== See also ==
- Texas State Highway 211
- The Texas Collection
