= Gay Hill, Washington County, Texas =

Gay Hill
- Ghost town
- Location within Texas Gay Hill (the United States)
- Coordinates: 30°16′19″N 96°29′39″W
- Country: United States
- State: Texas
- County: Washington
- Settled: 1839
- Named for: Early store owners, Thomas Gay and William Carroll Jackson Hill
- Elevation: 371 ft (113 m)
- Time zone: UTC-6 (Central (CST))
  - Summer (DST): UTC-5 (CDT)
- GNIS feature ID: 1336452

Gay Hill is an unincorporated area and a ghost town in Washington County, Texas, United States.

== Location ==
Gay Hill is located on Farm to Market Road 390, twelve miles north-west of Brenham in Washington County.

== History ==
The settlement was first known as the Chriesman Settlement, in honor of Horatio Chriesman (1797–1878). In 1839, the second oldest Presbyterian church in Texas was established here by Reverend Hugh Wilson (1794–1868). A year later, in 1840, the Republic of Texas established a post office and renamed it 'Gay Hill' in honor of Thomas Gay and William Carroll Jackson Hill, who owned the general store. A decade later, in 1854, a Mason lodge was formed here. Later, a Baptist church was also established.

The Glenblythe Plantation, owned by Scottish immigrant and nurseryman Thomas Affleck (1812-1868), was located in Gay Hill. He discovered the Old Gay Hill Red China rose, which is native to Gay Hill.

From 1853 to 1888, Reverend James Weston Miller (1815–1888) served as the director of the Live Oak Female Seminary, a defunct women's college.

In 1881, the Gulf, Colorado and Santa Fe Railway added a stop two miles away from Gay Hill. As a result, the town was moved, and the former location became known as Old Gay Hill. The railway made the cotton industry more efficient, and it became an important transportation hub for the South. However, shortly after World War II, the cotton industry declined and businesses started closing down. By 1971, most residents had moved to nearby Brenham.

The town is now a ghost town. There are no stores or schools in town. The main industry is ranching. The old Gay Hill School building has been relocated to Old Baylor Park in Independence, Texas. The Red House is listed on the National Register of Historic Places listings in Washington County, Texas.

== Demographics ==
By 1860, the population was 120. By 1936, the population had grown to 250. By 1958 however, the population had dwindled down to 200. In 1993 and again in 2000, the population was 145.
