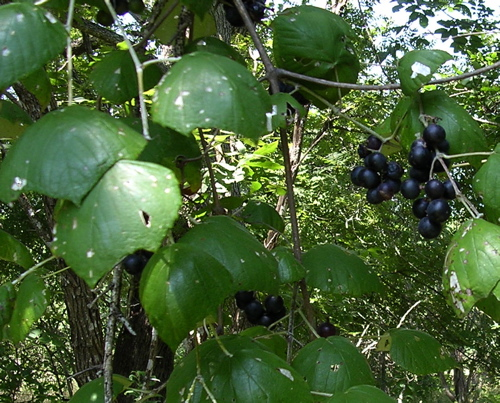

Conservation status
- Apparently Secure (NatureServe)

Scientific classification
- Kingdom: Plantae
- Clade: Tracheophytes
- Clade: Angiosperms
- Clade: Eudicots
- Clade: Rosids
- Order: Vitales
- Family: Vitaceae
- Genus: Vitis
- Species: V. mustangensis

Binomial name
- Vitis mustangensis Buckley

Synonyms
- Vitis candicans Engelm. ex Durand

= Vitis mustangensis =

Mustang grape

Species of grapevine

Vitis mustangensis, commonly known as the mustang grape, is a species of grape that is native to the southern United States. Its range includes parts of Mississippi, Alabama, Louisiana, Texas, and Oklahoma.

== Description ==
This woody species produces small clusters of hard green fruit that ripen into soft 3/4-inch (2 cm) dark purple berries between July –September.

They have a thick outer layer of flesh and on average contain four heart-shaped seeds. This variety of grape is recognized by the leaves that have a white velvet-like underside and lobed, cordate shape. These vines often cover trees, shrubs, fences and other objects that it grows near.

V. mustangensis is dioecious, with only female vines bearing fruit.

== Culinary use ==
The fruit can be potentially irritating to the skin when handled, and are mildly unpleasant to eat raw because of bitterness and a high acidity content, however consuming the sweet inner flesh apart from the skins is common.

This grape has a list of culinary use as jelly, pie-filling, wine and grape juice, all of which are typically processed with heat and sweetened with sugar.

Mustang grapes have been used to make mustang wine since before the Civil War.

The fruit and leaves of Mustang Grapes may also be used to dye wool.
