= Thomas Neville Waul =

American lawyer and politician (1813–1903)

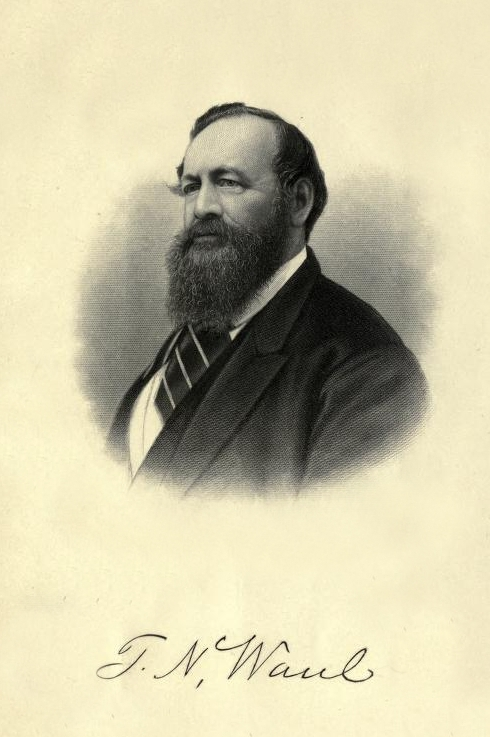

Deputy from Texas to the Provisional Congress of the Confederate States
- In office February 4, 1861 – February 17, 1862
- Preceded by: New constituency
- Succeeded by: Constituency abolished

Personal details
- Born: January 5, 1813 Sumter District, South Carolina, US
- Died: July 28, 1903 (aged 90) Hunt County, Texas, US
- Resting place: Oakwood Cemetery (Fort Worth, Texas)

Military service
- Allegiance: Confederate States of America
- Branch/service: Confederate States Army
- Years of service: 1861–1865
- Rank: Brigadier-General
- Commands: Waul's Legion; 1st Brigade, Texas Division
- Battles/wars: American Civil War: Siege of Vicksburg; Battle of Mansfield; Battle of Pleasant Hill; Battle of Jenkins Ferry

Thomas Neville Waul (January 5, 1813 – July 28, 1903) was a brigadier general in the Confederate States Army during the American Civil War (Civil War). Before the Civil War, he was a teacher, lawyer, judge and planter. He served for a year in the Provisional Confederate Congress from Texas. He was captured at the fall of Vicksburg, Mississippi, on July 4, 1863, and exchanged in October 1863. After his promotion, Waul served in the Confederate Trans-Mississippi Department. He was wounded at the Battle of Jenkins' Ferry. After the Civil War, Waul worked as a farmer and lawyer in Texas until his death at age 90.

== Early life ==
Thomas N. Waul was born January 5, 1813, in the Sumter District, now Sumter County, South Carolina, near Stateburg. He attended South Carolina College, now the University of South Carolina, until his junior year, then moved to Florence, Alabama, where he was a teacher. He moved to Vicksburg, Mississippi, in 1830 where he became a lawyer in 1835 and a judge. In 1850, he moved to Gonzales County, Texas, and became a planter. Waul made an unsuccessful run for a seat in the United States Congress in 1854. He served as a delegate to the Texas secession convention.

== American Civil War ==
Thomas N. Waul was a member of the Provisional Confederate Congress from Texas between February 19, 1861, and February 17, 1862, when a permanent Confederate government was established. He served on the Committee on Commercial Affairs and Committee on Indian Affairs. He opposed the African slave trade as a diplomatic effort and restrictions on the cotton trade. He supported establishment of the central government, free trade, and local defense. Waul lost his run for a seat in the First Confederate Congress of the regular Congress of the Confederate States.

On May 17, 1862, Waul entered Confederate States Army service as colonel of Waul's Legion, which he recruited.

Waul was captured when Vicksburg fell, on July 4, 1863. Waul was promoted to brigadier general on September 18, 1863, although he was not exchanged until October 16, 1863. His performance and leadership were commended by then Major General Stephen D. Lee. Waul then commanded a brigade in John G. Walker's Texas Division in the Confederate Trans-Mississippi Department. Waul's brigade fought in the Red River Campaign at the Battle of Mansfield and the Battle of Pleasant Hill, in Louisiana.

On April 30, 1864, after being transferred to Arkansas to oppose Union Major General Frederick Steele's Camden Expedition, Brigadier General Waul was wounded in the left arm at the Battle of Jenkins' Ferry. He returned to service in September 1864 and until December 1864 commanded Brigade I, Division I, I Corps of the Trans-Mississippi Department. From January 1865 to May 26, 1865, he commanded Brigade I, Division I, of the District of Texas, New Mexico, and Arizona in the Trans-Mississippi Department. There is no record of his parole.

== Later life ==
After the Civil War, Waul returned to Texas where he was elected to the first Texas Reconstruction convention. After practicing law at Galveston, Waul retired to Hunt County, Texas, near Greenville, where he was a farmer on his property named Cherry Hill Plantation. A marker still stands to this day on the property, honoring General Waul's life. Thomas Neville Waul died in Hunt County, Texas, on July 28, 1903. He is buried in Oakwood Cemetery at Fort Worth, Texas. Waul had no blood relatives at the time of his death.

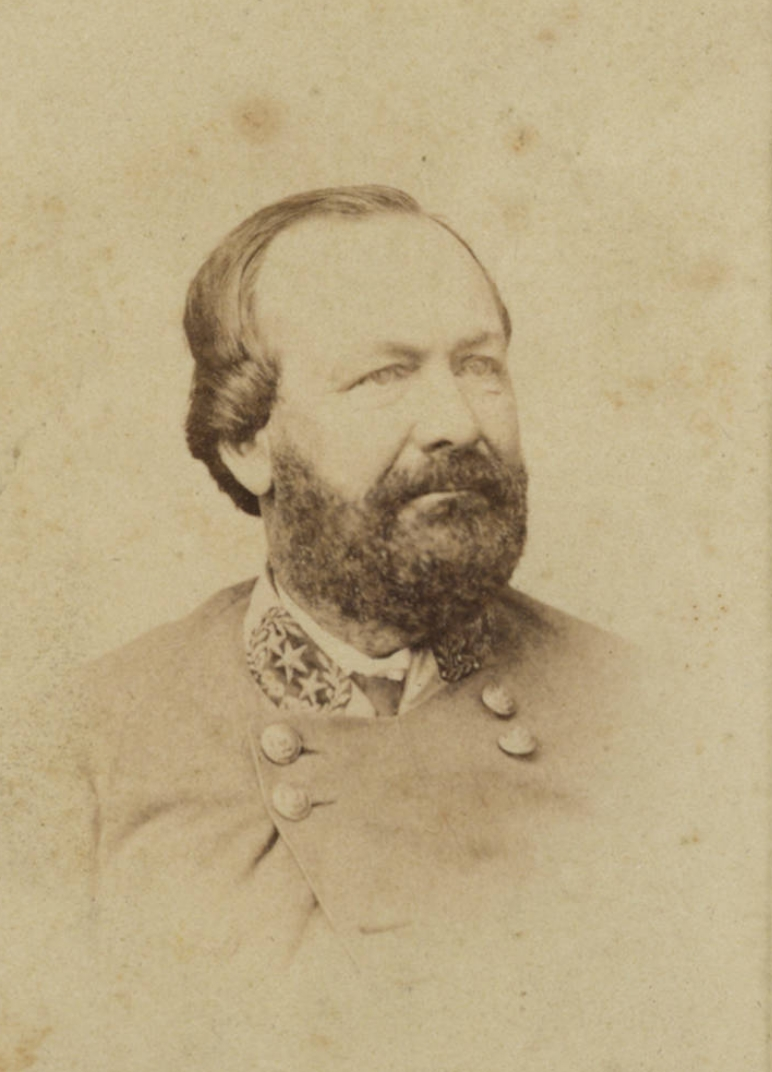
Waul in the Civil War

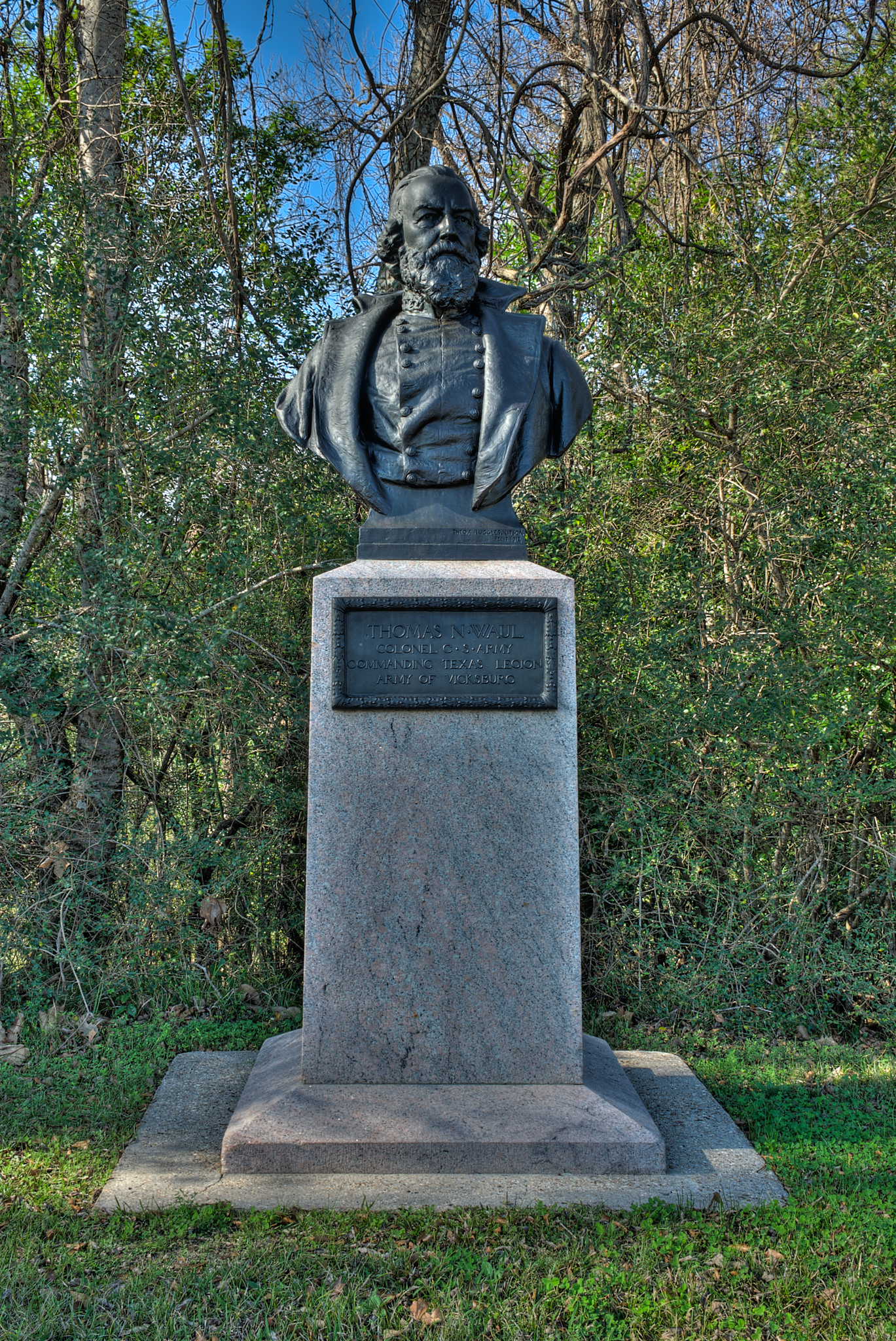
Bust of Waul by T.A.R. Kitson at Vicksburg National Military Park

== See also ==
- List of American Civil War generals (Confederate)

== Notes ==
Political offices
New constituency	Deputy from Texas to the Provisional Congress of the Confederate States; 1861–1862	Constituency abolished
