= 99th Illinois Infantry Regiment =

99th Regiment Illinois Volunteer Infantry
- Former Illinois state flag
- Active: August 23, 1862 – August 9, 1865
- Country: United States
- Allegiance: (United States) Union; Illinois
- Branch: Union Army
- Type: Infantry
- Size: Regiment
- Engagements: Battle of Port Gibson; Battle of Champion Hill; Battle of Big Black River; Siege of Vicksburg; Jackson Expedition; Battle of Brownsville; Battle of Fort Esperanza; Fort Blakeley

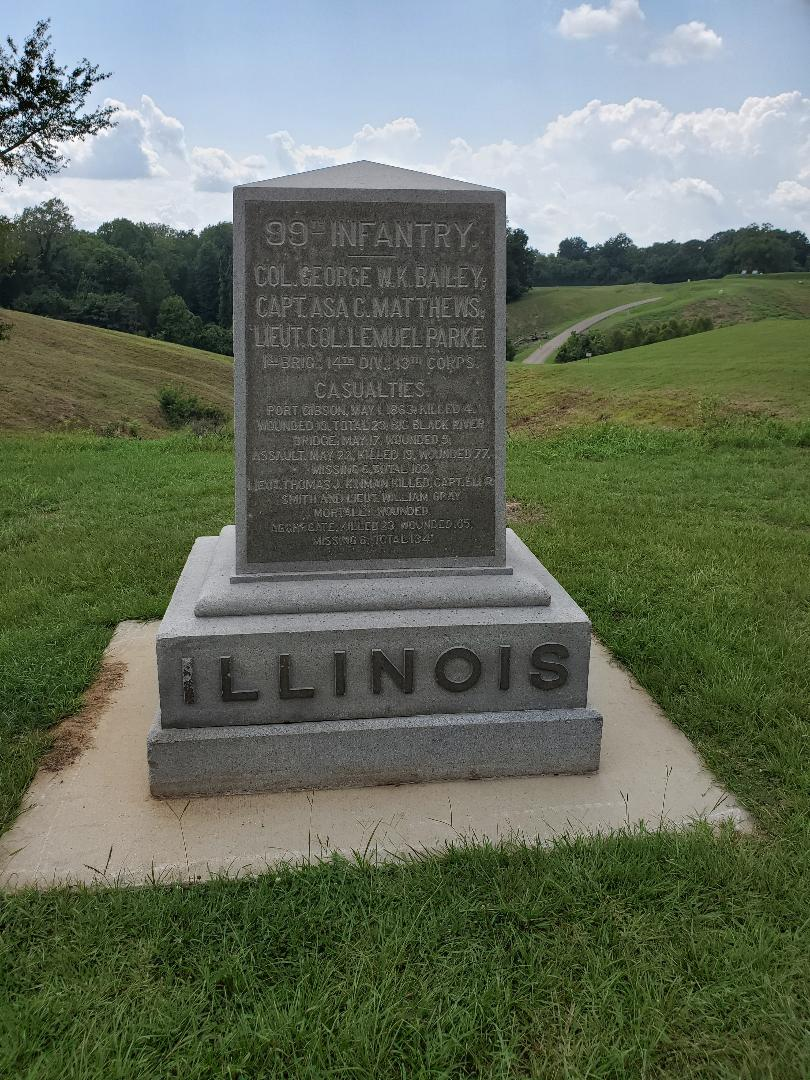
99th Illinois Volunteer Infantry Monument at Vicksburg National Military Park across the ravine from the Railroad Redoubt (2019)

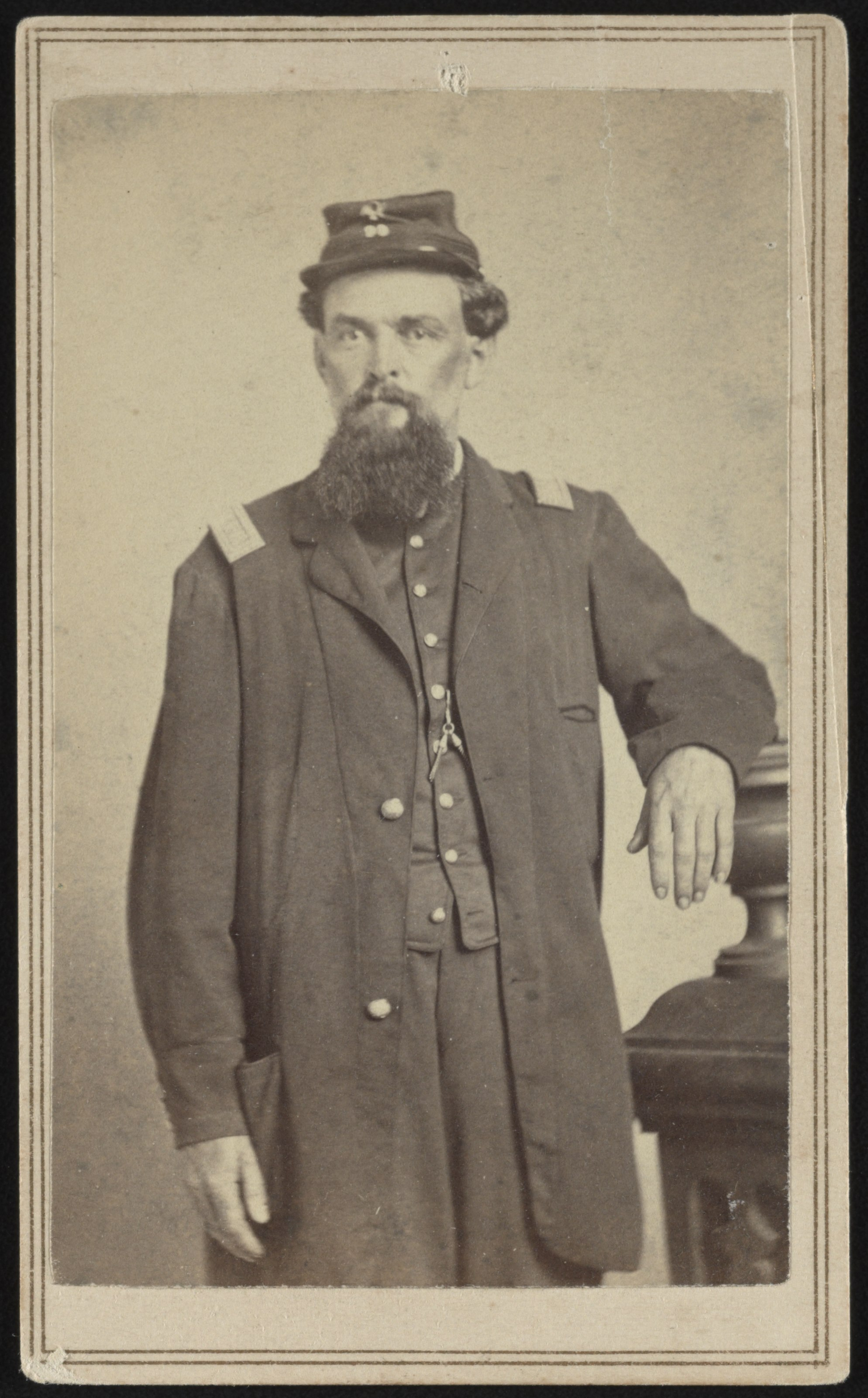
Captain Isaac G. Hodgen of Co. A, 99th Illinois Infantry Regiment. From the Liljenquist Family Collection of Civil War Photographs, Prints and Photographs Division, Library of Congress

The 99th Regiment Illinois Volunteer Infantry was an infantry regiment that served in the Union Army during the American Civil War. Recognized as the first regiment from Illinois to be mustered under the 1862 call for troops, they participated in several of the most important campaigns of the Western Theater, including the Siege of Vicksburg and the Mobile Campaign.

== Service ==
=== Initial Service ===
The regiment was formed in Pike County, Illinois, in August 1862 by Colonel George W.K. Bailey. The 99th Illinois Infantry was organized at Florence, Illinois and mustered into Federal service on August 23, 1862. The regiment immediately moved to Benton Barracks in St. Louis, Missouri, to receive equipment before being attached to the District of Rolla.

The 99th Regiment spent its first winter in southern Missouri, where they engaged in skirmishes at Beaver Creek and participated in the Battle of Hartsville, resulting in 35 casualties. In early 1863, the regiment traveled through West Plains and Pilot Knob before departing for Louisiana to join the Vicksburg Campaign.

=== Vicksburg Campaign ===
The regiment embarked at Miliken's Bend before being assigned to Benton's 1st Brigade, of Carr's 14th Division of XIII Corps. On April 12, the regiment marched to New Carthage, before maching to Roundway Bayou, subsequently moving to the Grand Gulf on April 30. The regiment participated in the Battle of Port Gibson where it lost 37 men killed or wounded.

The regiment was mustered out on July 31, 1865, and discharged at Springfield, Illinois, on August 9, 1865.

== Total strength and casualties ==
The regiment suffered 4 officers and 47 enlisted men who were killed in action or who died of their wounds 1 officer and 120 enlisted men who died of disease, for a total of 172 fatalities.

== Commanders ==
- Colonel George W.K. Bailey - Mustered out December 16, 1864.

== See also ==
- List of Illinois Civil War Units
- Illinois in the American Civil War
- Thomas J. Higgins, a soldier in the 99th Illinois who won the Medal of Honor for his actions during the Battle of Vicksburg.
