= Duckport Canal =

American Civil War waterway in Louisiana

Coordinates: 32°23′37″N 91°02′51″W

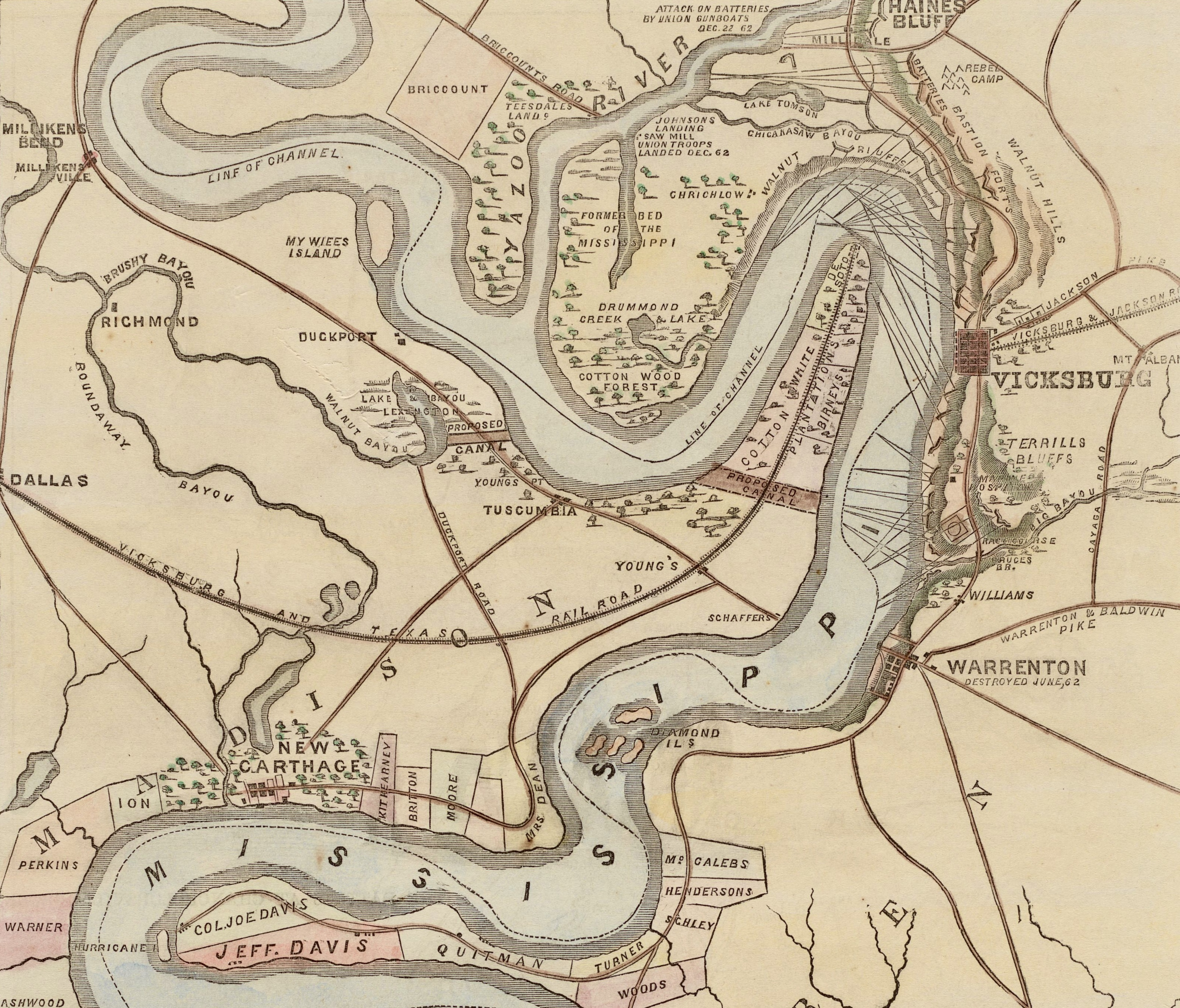
Landmarks in the vicinity of Vicksburg, Mississippi, from a river map published in 1863, showing Duckport and New Carthage

The Duckport Canal was an unsuccessful military venture by Union forces during the Vicksburg campaign of the American Civil War. Ordered built in late March 1863 by Major General Ulysses S. Grant, the canal connected the Mississippi River near Duckport, Louisiana, to New Carthage, Louisiana, using a series of swampy bayous for much of its path. It was intended to provide a water-based supply route for a southward movement against the Confederate-held city of Vicksburg, Mississippi, as high water made overland travel difficult. Some 3,500 soldiers of Grant's army dug the canal, which was filled on April 13 with water from the Mississippi River. But trees and low water levels rendered the canal all but impassable, and the project was abandoned on May 4. Grant moved men and supplies through the overland route, which had been made more accessible by the same falling water levels that doomed the canal. After some inland maneuvering and a lengthy siege, Vicksburg surrendered on July 4, a turning point in the war.

== Background ==
Approximate location of the canal cut

During the opening days of the American Civil War in 1861, the Anaconda Plan to defeat the Confederate States of America was developed by Commanding General of the United States Army Winfield Scott. A key component of the Anaconda Plan was controlling the Mississippi River, which would cut the Confederacy in two as well as provide an outlet for American goods to be exported. In early 1862, Union forces captured New Orleans, and Union Navy elements moved upriver to Confederate-held Vicksburg, Mississippi. Vicksburg was the last Confederate position remaining on the Mississippi River at this time. Union vessels bombarded the city beginning in late May, but were unable to force it into submission. A joint army-navy force moved against the city again in June. Union infantry began construction on what became known as Grant's Canal in hopes of creating a waterway that would bypass Vicksburg, but the project was abandoned in late July. In August, Confederate troops occupied and fortified a second point on the Mississippi River at Port Hudson, Louisiana, 130 miles (210 km) south of Vicksburg.

Beginning in late November 1862, Union forces led by Major General Ulysses S. Grant advanced overland on Vicksburg from the north, but were forced to retreat after their supply lines were wrecked by Confederate cavalry. Another prong led by Major General William T. Sherman traveled down the Mississippi River closer to Vicksburg before attacking, but was repulsed at the Battle of Chickasaw Bayou. Grant again took command of efforts against the city in January 1863, troops having arrived in the area by then. Confederate defenses of the city were too strong for a direct assault, the ground north of Vicksburg would greatly hamper maneuvers, and proceeding north to begin another overland campaign would be considered a retreat by the general public. Work on the old Grant's Canal resumed that month, but the project was fraught with difficulties and was abandoned in March as unsuccessful. Work began on another canal at Lake Providence known as the Lake Providence Canal in February. This canal was delayed by flooding after the levee separating the Mississippi River and the lake was breached, and was eventually abandoned in late March, as Grant shifted his focus to other plans; it had also seen difficulties with trees blocking the channel. Two attempts to weave through the waterways around the city, the Yazoo Pass Expedition and the Steele's Bayou Expedition, also failed.

== Canal ==
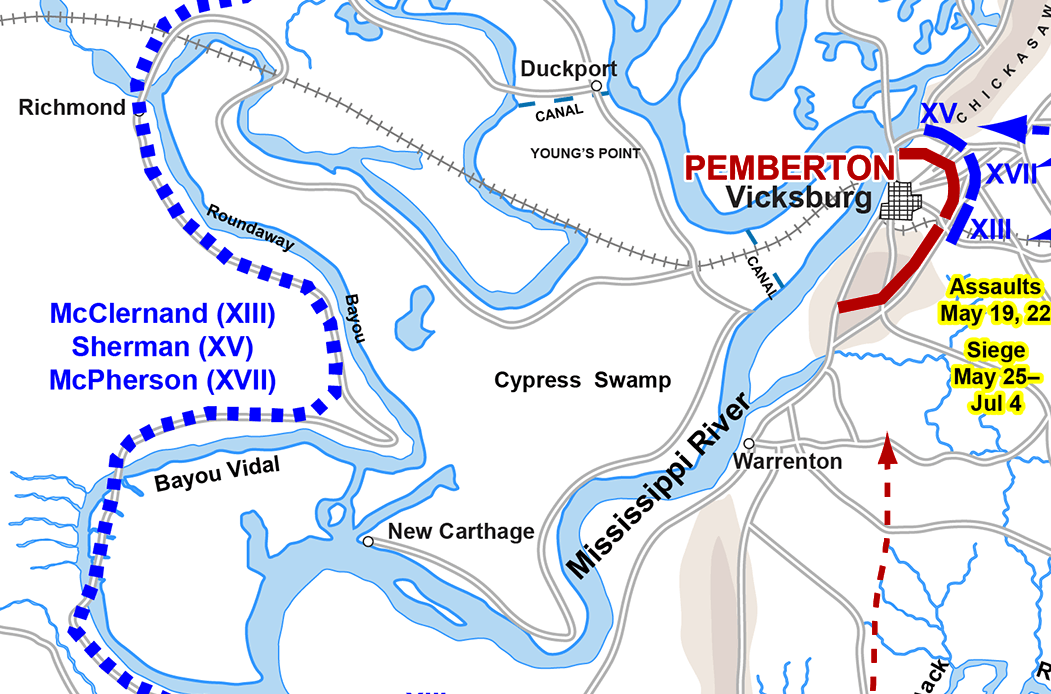
A map of operations during the Vicksburg campaign, including the Duckport Canal at top center Confederate Union

Grant decided on March 27 to inquire about the potential of another canal. The idea was to cut a canal from the Mississippi River near Duckport, Louisiana, to eventually connect with Walnut Bayou, creating a waterway to New Carthage, Louisiana. The proposed passage was surveyed by United States Army Corps of Engineers officer John W. Cornyn and 300 men. On March 29, Grant ordered troops to march down the west side of the Mississippi River to New Carthage; the Duckport Canal could be used to run a supply line from Milliken's Bend, Louisiana, down to New Carthage as the single road to New Carthage was unreliable due to high water levels. A canal along the path could particularly be used to supply Union troops marching overland to New Carthage.

Historian Donald L. Miller describes the path of the canal as going from the Mississippi River into Walnut Bayou and then Roundaway Bayou, re-entering the Mississippi River near New Carthage; historians John D. Winters and Terry L. Jones state that the path would go from the Mississippi River into Big Bayou, then Willow Bayou, then Roundaway Bayou, and then Bayou Vidal before re-entering the Mississippi River at New Carthage. The historian Timothy B. Smith describes the path as going from the Mississippi River to Walnut Bayou, which met Roundaway Bayou at Richmond, Louisiana. Roundaway Bayou then met Bayou Vidal a few miles from New Carthage. Several trees had grown up in these swampy bayous and would need to be cleared out before the waterways could be used. Writer Shelby Foote suggests Grant had "no great hope that much would come of the enterprise", as only light-draft ships would be able to go through the canal. Union officer Lucius Hubbard also noted the project was "undertaken with a somewhat subdued enthusiasm".

According to historian Terry Winschel, the cut itself was to be 3 miles (4.8 km) long and then enter Walnut Bayou at Cooper's Plantation. Miller gives the distance of the cut as 2 miles (3.2 km) from the Mississippi to Walnut Bayou. Engineer David F. Bastian states the length of the cut was 0.5 miles (0.8 km), and Winters and Jones give a distance of 300 yards (270 m). A work co-authored by Winschel and historian William L. Shea states the initial canal was 0.5 miles (0.8 km) long and was then connected via 3 miles (4.8 km) of obscure streams to Walnut Bayou. Historian Ed Bearss states the distance between Big Bayou and the Mississippi River was 300 yards (270 m), and that Cornyn, upon his initial inspection, estimated that a total cut of 0.5 miles (0.80 km) would be required to get from the Mississippi River into Willow Bayou, as Big Bayou was badly obstructed. He also notes a further 3 miles (4.8 km) would be required to reach Roundaway Bayou. Winters and Jones state that the canal width vertically tapered from 50 feet (15 m) to 25 feet (7.6 m) at the bottom depth of 15 feet (4.6 m); Bastian, Winschel, and Bearss state it was 7 feet (2.1 m) deep and 40 feet (12 m) wide. The overall distance between the entrance to the canal cut and its ending point was 37 miles (60 km) according to Bastian and Winters and "nearly 50 miles (80 km) long" according to Jones.

Digging for the canal began on March 31. Colonel George G. Pride led the work party, with Captain F. E. Prime providing assistance. Lieutenant William Le Baron Jenney was in charge of some engineering aspects. The canal work force was initially 1,000 soldiers, but this was increased to 3,500, with others at work further down the bayou system. Some of the workers came from Bissell's Engineer Regiment. The men working on the canal gave it the nickname "Pride's Ditch". The soldiers' daily work routine was to leave for the canal site at 7:30 am and start to return to camp at 6:00 pm. The workers were disturbed by fewer insects than expected and lived well off of the food available in the area. Venomous snakes falling from overhanging branches onto the soldiers' rafts remained an issue. Work on the canal was about halfway completed by April 6, and was mostly done by April 11. Manual digging was completed the next day, and the levee holding back the Mississippi was cut on April 13. At the time the levee was cut, the obstructions had been cleared to within 5 miles (8.0 km) of Richmond, Louisiana. Four dredges were brought in to deepen the channel, having been taken from the work on Grant's Canal. More soldiers worked to clear stumps and trees. Swing saws placed on rafts were used to cut underwater trees.

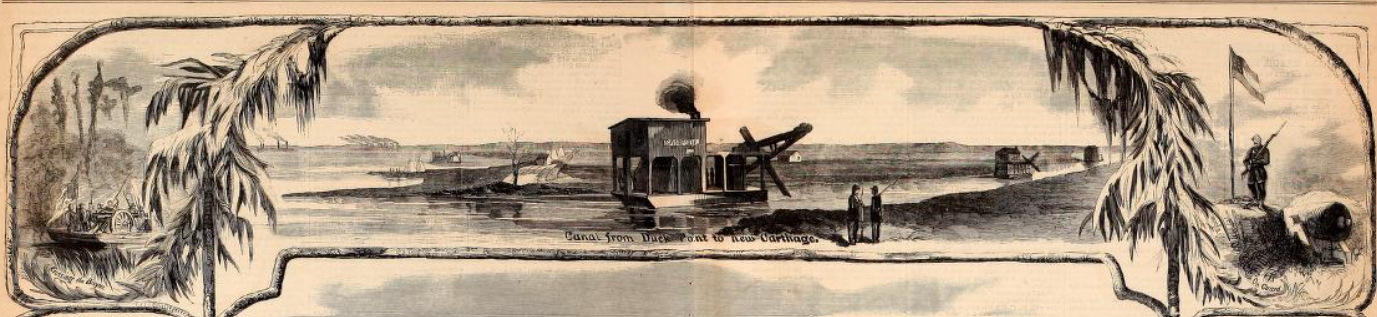
The Duckport Canal, as drawn by Theodore R. Davis and published in Harper's Weekly

After the levee was cut, Pride estimated that only four more days of work were needed, although it was noted the water in the bayous was rising slower than expected. When the transport Silver Wave entered the lower end of Bayou Vidal on April 18 to scout the pathway, she was unable to do so due to low water and trees. Grant inspected the canal that day, which also saw the level of the Mississippi River begin to fall. Four days later, a tugboat entered the bayous via the cut at the upper (north) end of the canal. Tree and stump clearing continued through April 23. The Mississippi River dropped 15 feet (4.6 m) in a matter of days, and there was soon only 6 inches (15 cm) of water in part of the canal. The project was abandoned on May 4. The tugboat Victor was the only ship to make it all the way to New Carthage through the canal. Two of the dredges and 20 other boats became grounded in the mud, where they were left to rot.

== Aftermath ==
The Duckport Canal was the last canal attempted by Grant during the Vicksburg campaign. The falling waters that had hampered the canal also opened up the overland route, allowing Grant to use it on a larger scale to bring men and supplies to New Carthage. The Union Navy had also determined ships could pass the Vicksburg batteries with little risk of major hull damage by hugging the Mississippi shore of the river. On April 30, Grant landed troops on the Vicksburg side of the Mississippi, downriver from the city and the Confederate position at Grand Gulf. The next day, Union forces began the move inland. After fighting the Battle of Raymond in mid-May, Grant swung his army to strike Jackson, Mississippi, which was taken by the Union on May 14. Turning west, Grant's army defeated the Confederates at the battles of Champion Hill and Big Black River Bridge, and the Siege of Vicksburg began on May 18. Union frontal attacks on May 19 and May 22 were repulsed, and the siege dragged on until the Confederates, isolated and starving, surrendered on July 4. For the Confederacy, the capture of Vicksburg was a major blow and was a significant factor in the eventual Union victory. Jones writes that the Duckport Canal, like Grant's Canal, could have been successful with better conditions from the Mississippi River.

Little is left of the path of the Duckport Canal today. As of 2016, it was commemorated by a historic marker in Madison Parish, Louisiana.

== See also ==
- Louisiana in the American Civil War

== Sources ==
- Ballard, Michael B. (2004). Vicksburg: The Campaign that Opened the Mississippi. Chapel Hill, North Carolina: University of North Carolina Press. ISBN 978-0-8078-2893-9.
- Bastian, David F. (1995). Grant's Canal: The Union Attempt to Bypass Vicksburg. Shippensburg, Pennsylvania: Burd Street Press. ISBN 0-942597-93-1.
- Bearss, Edwin C. (1991) [1986]. The Campaign for Vicksburg. Vol. II: Grant Strikes a Fatal Blow. Dayton, Ohio: Morningside Bookshop. ISBN 0-89029-313-9.
- ——— (2007) [2006]. Fields of Honor. Washington, D.C.: National Geographic. ISBN 978-1-4262-0093-9.
- Brady, Lisa M. (2012). War Upon the Land: Military Strategy and the Transformation of Southern Landscapes During the American Civil War. Athens, Georgia: University of Georgia Press. ISBN 978-0-8203-2985-7.
- Dougherty, Kevin (2011). The Campaigns for Vicksburg 1862–1863: Leadership Lessons. Philadelphia: Casemate. ISBN 978-1-61200-014-5.
- Foote, Shelby (1986) [1963]. The Civil War: A Narrative. Vol. 2: Fredericksburg to Meridian. New York: Vintage Books. ISBN 0-394-74621-X.
- Grabau, Warren (2000). Ninety-eight Days: A Geographer's View of the Vicksburg Campaign. Knoxville, Tennessee: University of Tennessee Press. ISBN 978-1-57233-068-9.
- Jones, Terry L. (1979). "Grant's Canals in Northeast Louisiana". Journal of the North Louisiana Historical Association. 10 (2): 7–17.
- Kennedy, Frances H., ed. (1998). The Civil War Battlefield Guide (2nd ed.). Boston/New York: Houghton Mifflin. ISBN 978-0-395-74012-5.
- Miller, Donald L. (2019). Vicksburg: Grant's Campaign that Broke the Confederacy. New York: Simon and Schuster. ISBN 978-1-4516-4139-4.
- Shea, William L.; Winschel, Terrence J. (2003). Vicksburg Is the Key: The Struggle for the Mississippi River. Lincoln, Nebraska: University of Nebraska Press. ISBN 978-0-8032-9344-1.
- Smith, Timothy B. (2023). Bayou Battles for Vicksburg: The Swamp and River Expeditions, January 1–April 30, 1863. Lawrence, Kansas: University Press of Kansas. ISBN 978-0-7006-3566-5.
- Winters, John D. (1991) [1963]. The Civil War in Louisiana. Baton Rouge, Louisiana: Louisiana State University Press. ISBN 0-8071-1725-0.
- Woodworth, Steven E. (1990). Jefferson Davis and His Generals: The Failure of Confederate Command in the West. Lawrence, Kansas: University Press of Kansas. ISBN 0-7006-0567-3.
