= Milliken's Bend =

Milliken's Bend may refer to:

- Milliken's Bend, Louisiana, an extinct settlement along the Mississippi River in Madison Parish
- Battle of Milliken's Bend (1863)
