= Duckport, Louisiana =

Extinct settlement, Madison Parish

Duckport Duck Port, Duckport Landing, Sparta, Sparta Landing
- Plantation and boat landing
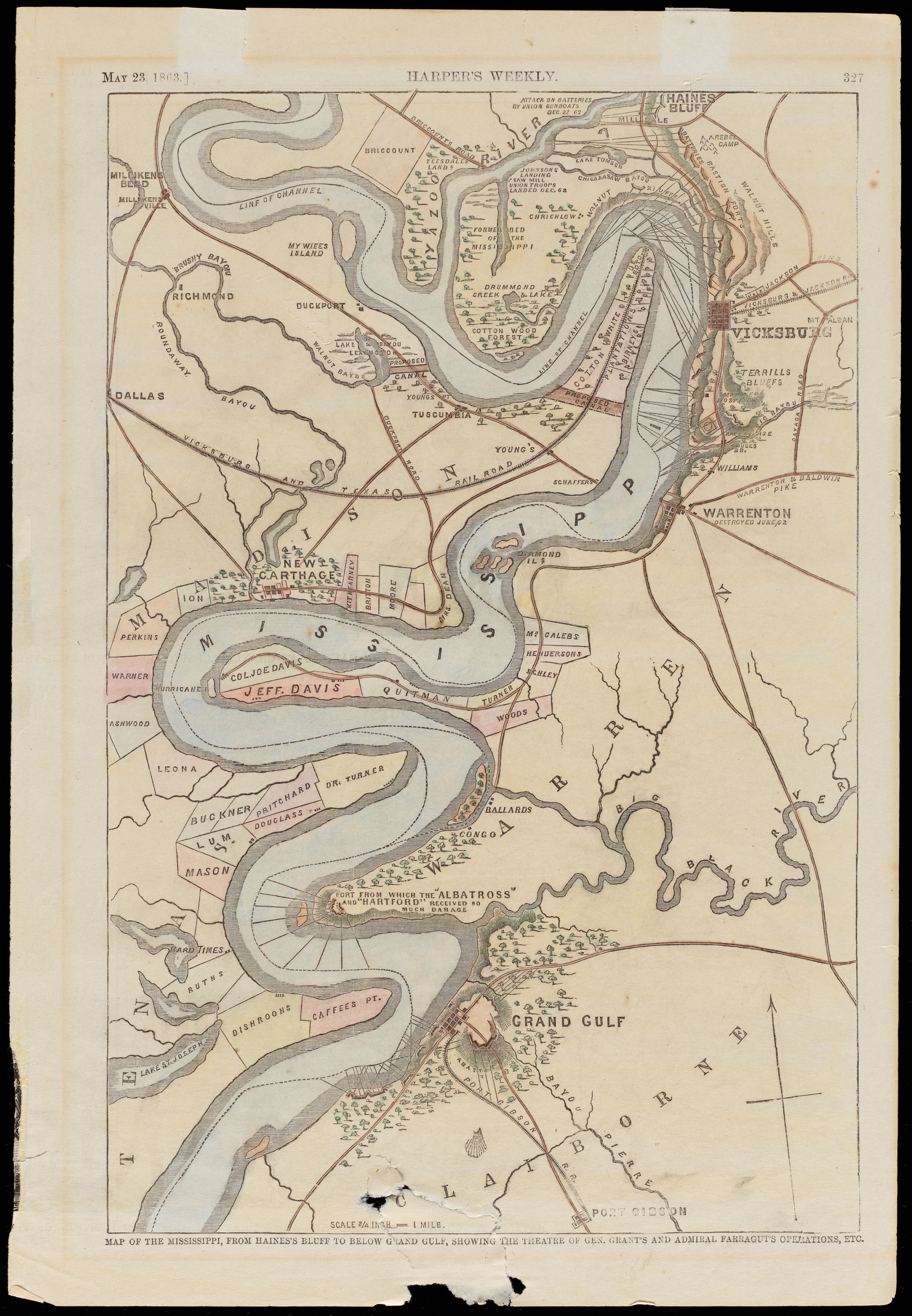
- Duckport on the Mississippi River near Paw Paw Island (also known as My Wife's Island)

- Location within Louisiana
- Coordinates: 32°23′33″N 91°00′50″W
- Country: United States
- State: Louisiana
- Parish: Madison
- Settled: by 1817
- Founder: Early settlers (notably Judge Lindsey)
- Named for: Ducks in the area (assumed), Sparta (alternate name)

Population
  - Total: ~150 families (1,869 post office application)
- Time zone: UTC-6 (CST)
  - Summer (DST): UTC-5 (CDT)
- GNIS feature ID: 549223
- Listed in 19th-century maps and USGS as Duck Port (historical)

Duckport (also Duck Port or Duckport Landing) was a plantation and Mississippi River boat landing in Madison Parish, Louisiana, United States. (Note: Listed by the USGS as Duck Port (historical).) Duckport is primarily remembered today for having been one of the endpoints of the unsuccessful Duckport Canal project during the American Civil War. An alternate or related name for Duckport was Sparta or Sparta Landing. As of 1890, the two placenames, Duckport and Sparta, were located about 300 yards (270 m) apart on the right bank of the river, with Sparta preferred in high water, and Duckport preferred in low.

== Location ==
Duckport (also called Sparta or Sparta Landing) stood on the Louisiana bank of the Mississippi River between Paw Paw Island (also known historically as "My Wife's Island" or Island No. 103) and Young's Point. The Mississippi River Commission's 1883 mileage tables list the site as "Sparta or Duckport Landing" at 589.7 miles above Head of Passes," with nearby entries for Milliken's Bend (581.0 AHP), Young's Point (593.4 AHP), and Vicksburg (599.3 AHP). Modern mapping still shows "Duckport Landing" and "Sparta Landing" labels in the area on the U.S. Geological Survey 7.5-minute Ashly, Louisiana quadrangle. The Geographic Names Information System (GNIS) records "Duck Port (historical)" at approximately 32°23′33″N 91°00′50″W.

== History ==
=== Pre-Civil War ===
In the early 19th century, the settlement was known as Sparta and was described in Zadok Cramer's Navigator in 1817:

Good landing on the left side opposite [My Wife's Island], along a willow shore. The river bends to the right. This island is about 3 miles long. Opposite the head of No. 103 on the left shore, the old bed of the river formerly ran across to the Yazoo, and entered that river two miles above its present mouth. This tract is marked by the young willows with which it is now filled. Just below No. 103, on the right side, and in a right hand bend, is a considerable settlement, called SPARTA, on which resides judge Lindsey, below whose farm the river bears hard against the right hand bank, and it requires some pulling to keep out from among the fallen trees and snags near the shore. The bank having given way considerably in one place, an eddy is formed, but it presents no danger if you ply the oars well and keep pretty well out.

My Wife's Island, also known as Paw Paw Island, was described as a particular river navigation hazard, where boats were prone to major hull damage from snags, which were submerged tree trunks; the boatmen called them, depending on their behavior in the water, sawyers, planters, or preachers. My Wife's Island was listed as a notable danger zone, along with "Plum Point, Turkey Island, Dogtooth Bend, Riddle's Point, Number Ten, Devil's Island, Hull's Left Leg, Elk Island, Number Twenty-One, Devil's Backbone, Devil's Tea Table, Hanging Dog's Island, Devil's Elbow, Tyawapita...Shirt-tail Bend, Grand Chain, Goose Island, and the Grave Yard."

Sparta Plantation was said to have been "one of the first cotton estates in Louisiana." There was a boat landing at Duckport that was used by mail packet steamboats beginning sometime before 1852.

=== Civil War: Duckport Canal (1863) ===
On March 31, 1863, Union engineers began cutting a canal from Duckport Landing into Walnut Bayou to create a water route for supplies and troop movement on the west side of the Mississippi. About 3,500 soldiers under Col. George G. Pride (the project was nicknamed "Pride's Ditch") and six companies of Col. Josiah Bissell's Engineer Regiment of the West worked to excavate a channel roughly 3 miles (4.8 km) long, 7 feet (2.1 m) deep, and 40 feet (12 m) wide to Cooper's Plantation on Walnut Bayou. The levee was cut on April 13 and steam dredges entered, but falling river stages left the bayou chain too shallow. Work was abandoned by May 4, with two dredges and 20 barges stranded in the canal–bayou; only the tug Victor reached New Carthage.

=== Post-Civil War ===
In 1869, the application for a Duck Port post office stated there were about 150 families in the vicinity who would be served by the station. There was a series of suspicious fires at Duckport in 1885–86 that totaled a home at Sparta Landing, a storehouse, and a lumber warehouse.

=== 20th century to present ===
In the 20th century, the sternwheel packet boat Ben Hur burned and sank at Duckport in March 1916. Duckport was flooded in spring 1922. There was an illegal 150-gallon still in operation near Duckport during Prohibition. A fragment of the civil war-era canal was still visible in 1933 from a gravel road that ran from Thomaston to Duckport. (Thomaston Road had been the "center of wealth" in the area before the war and had once been lined with plantation houses.) The Duckport Plantation encompassed about 1,800 acres (730 ha) as of the 1990s. By the 21st century, all that was left of the canal was "a small indentation because area farmers tried to plow it down."

Historic mapping shows Duckport and Sparta landings in use through the late 19th and early 20th centuries; for example, the 1909 Milliken's Bend quadrangle and later USGS mapping depict "Duckport Landing" and "Sparta Landing". The landing site has been lost to channel migration, with on-land interpretation shifted to nearby markers for the Duckport Canal and related Vicksburg Campaign sites.

== Additional images ==
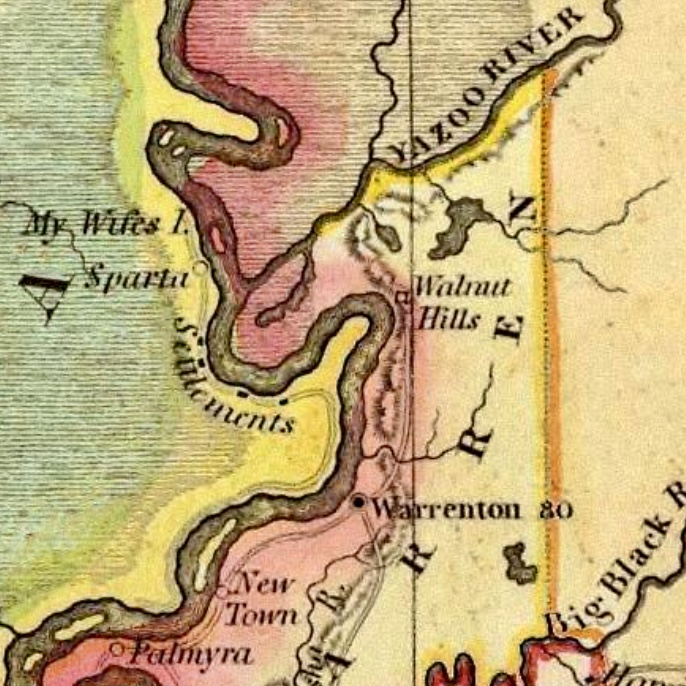
1823 map showing Duckport and Paw Paw Island as Sparta and My Wife's Island

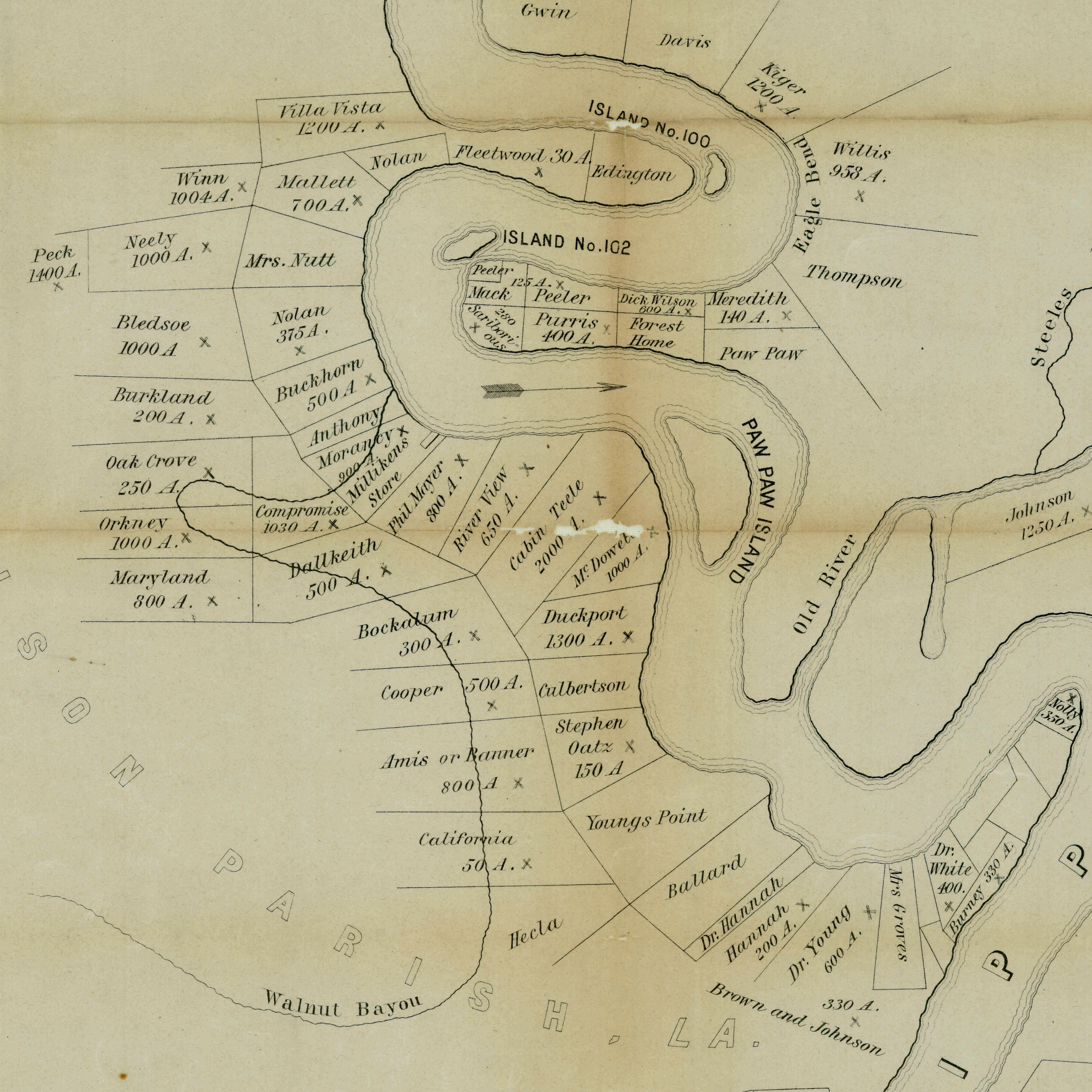
Reconstruction-era map showing Duckport plantation

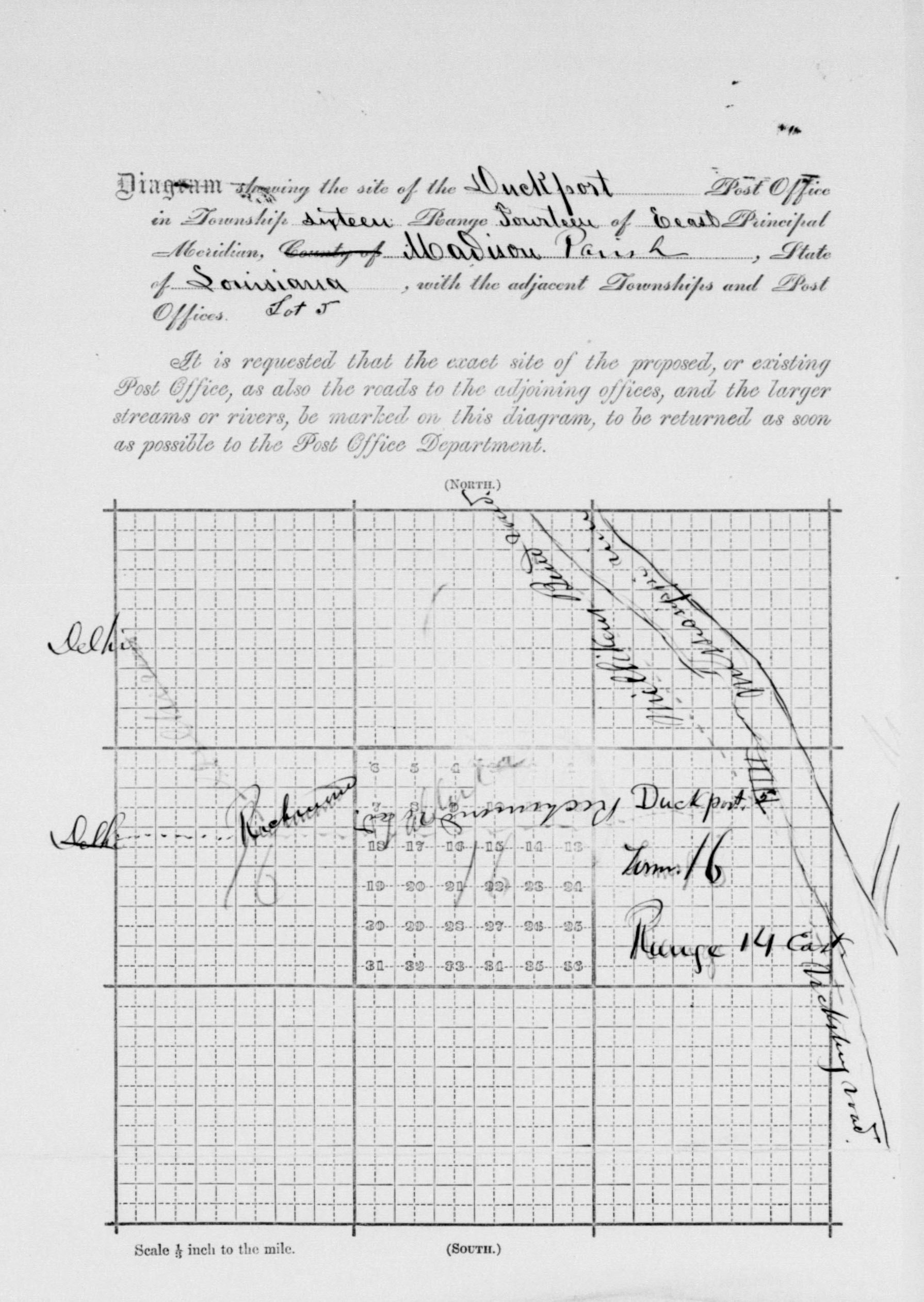
Location of Duckport, Louisiana in 1869

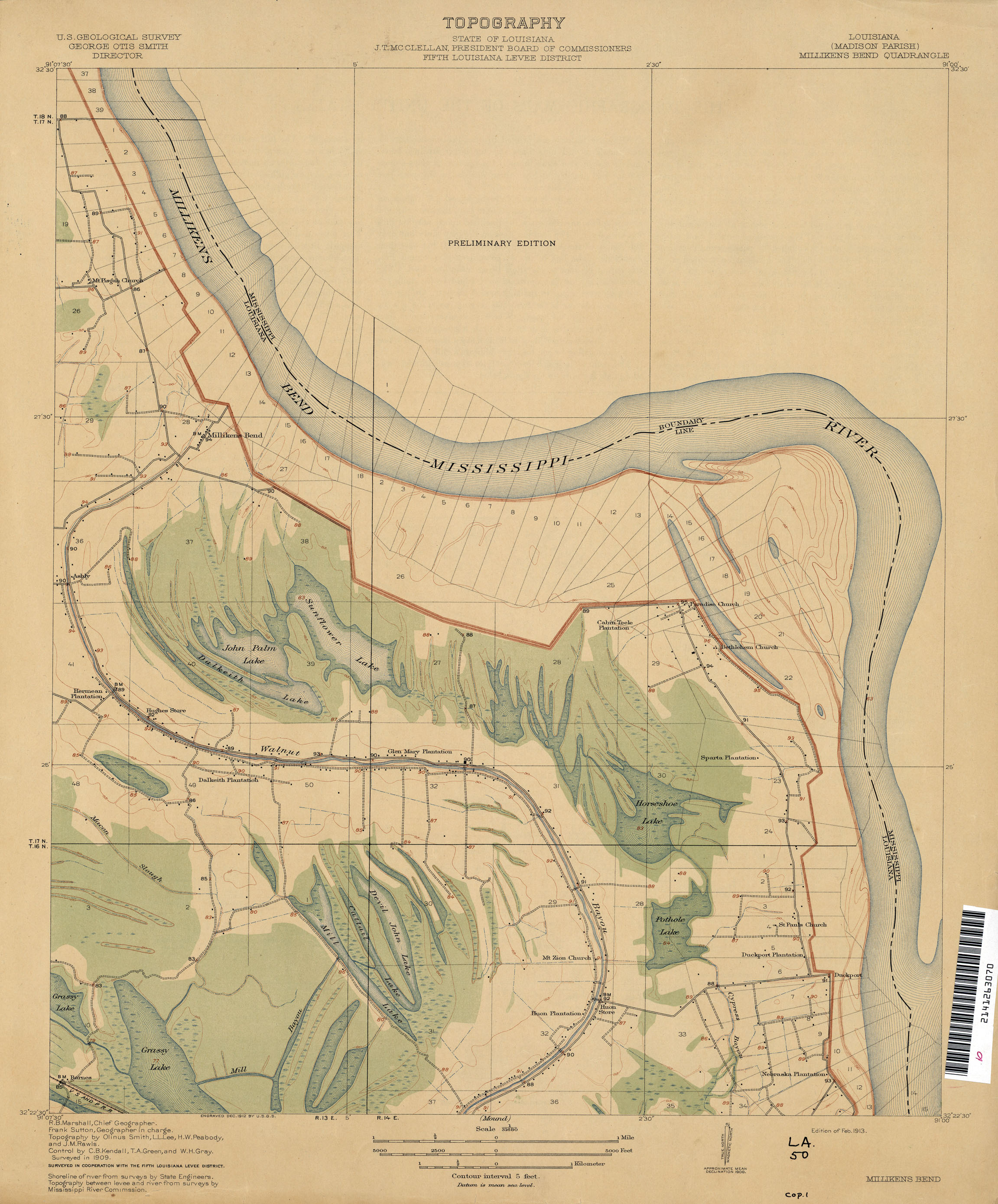
Duckport, Duckport Landing, and Sparta plantation visible in 1909 Milliken's Bend quadrangle map (Perry-Castañeda Library Map Collection)

== See also ==
- New Carthage, Louisiana
- Milliken's Bend, Louisiana
- Mississippi River in the American Civil War
