= Thomas J. Higgins =

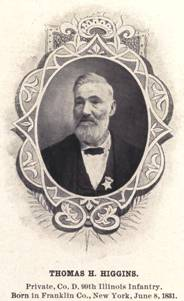
- Born: June 8, 1831; Huntingdon, Quebec, Canada
- Died: August 15, 1917 (aged 86); Hannibal, Missouri
- Burial place: Holy Family Cemetery Hannibal, Missouri
- Military career
- Allegiance: United States of America; Union
- Branch: United States Army; Union Army
- Service years: 1862 - 1865
- Rank: Sergeant
- Units: Company D, 99th Illinois Volunteer Infantry Regiment
- Conflicts: American Civil War; Siege of Vicksburg
- Awards: Medal of Honor

Thomas J. Higgins (June 8, 1831 – August 15, 1917) was a Union Army soldier during the American Civil War who was a recipient of America's highest military decoration, the Medal of Honor, for his actions at the Battle of Vicksburg.

Higgins joined the 99th Illinois Infantry in August 1862, and was mustered out in July 1865.

== Biography ==
Higgins entered the Union Army at Barry, Illinois in 1862, and was a private in Company D of the 99th Illinois Volunteer Infantry Regiment. The 99th Illinois was part of the Army of the Tennessee under General Ulysses S. Grant which besieged the Confederate stronghold of Vicksburg, Mississippi beginning on May 18, 1863

On May 22, Grant launched a major assault against Vicksburg. Higgins volunteered to act as the color bearer for his regiment on that day as the acting color bearer had been previously wounded. Higgins' regiment, the 99th Illinois, and four other Union regiments attacked a section of the Vicksburg defenses held by the 2nd Texas Infantry Regiment, which succeeded in repulsing the attack. According to one of its members, Charles I. Evans, after the assault was beaten back, a color bearer (Higgins) continued to advance towards the Confederate lines. Seeing this, "at least a hundred men took deliberate aim at him, and fired at point-blank range", yet Higgins was not hit. When they saw that he did not falter, the Texans then ceased firing and cheered on Higgins to keep coming, who safely reached the breastworks and was congratulated by them.

Higgins was then interrogated by the Vicksburg garrison commander, General John C. Pemberton, but refused to give him any solid information about Grant's army. He was paroled and exchanged a few days later, rejoining the 99th Illinois. He stayed with the regiment until the end of the war.

At the request of his captors, Higgins received the Medal of Honor, receiving it on April 1, 1898.

Higgins died on August 15, 1917, and was buried at Holy Family Cemetery in Hannibal, Missouri.

== Medal of Honor citation ==
Rank and organization: Sergeant, Company D, 99th Illinois Infantry. Place and date: At Vicksburg, Miss., May 22, 1863. Entered service at: Barry, Pike County, Ill. Birth: Canada. Date of issue: April 1, 1898.

Citation:

When his regiment fell back in the assault, repulsed, this soldier continued to advance and planted the flag on the parapet, where he was captured by the enemy.

== See also ==
- List of Medal of Honor recipients
- List of American Civil War Medal of Honor recipients: G–L
