= New Carthage, Louisiana =

Extinct settlement in Tensas Parish

"Map of the Parish of Madison, La." c. 1860

New Carthage, Louisiana, also known as Carthage Landing, was a 19th-century Mississippi River boat landing and village surrounded by cotton-producing agricultural land and undeveloped wetlands. New Carthage was located in, successively, Concordia Parish, Madison Parish, and Tensas Parish in Louisiana, United States. Destroyed by a combination of the American Civil War and the power of the Mississippi River, nothing remains of it.

== Geography ==
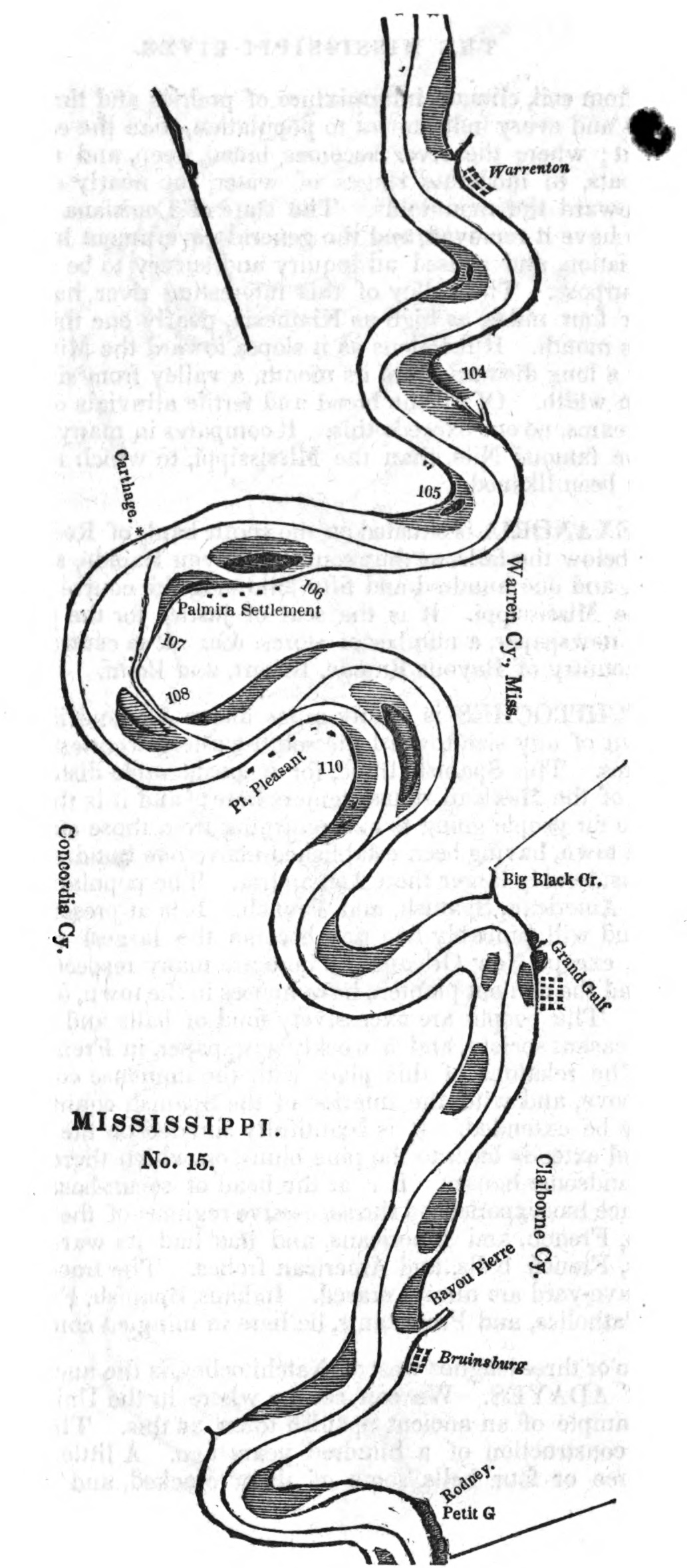
Mississippi No. 15 in Conclin's New River Guide (1854)

New Carthage, Louisiana was located at 32.2140°N 91.126°W at an elevation of 75 ft (23 m).

== History ==
=== Establishment to 1860 ===
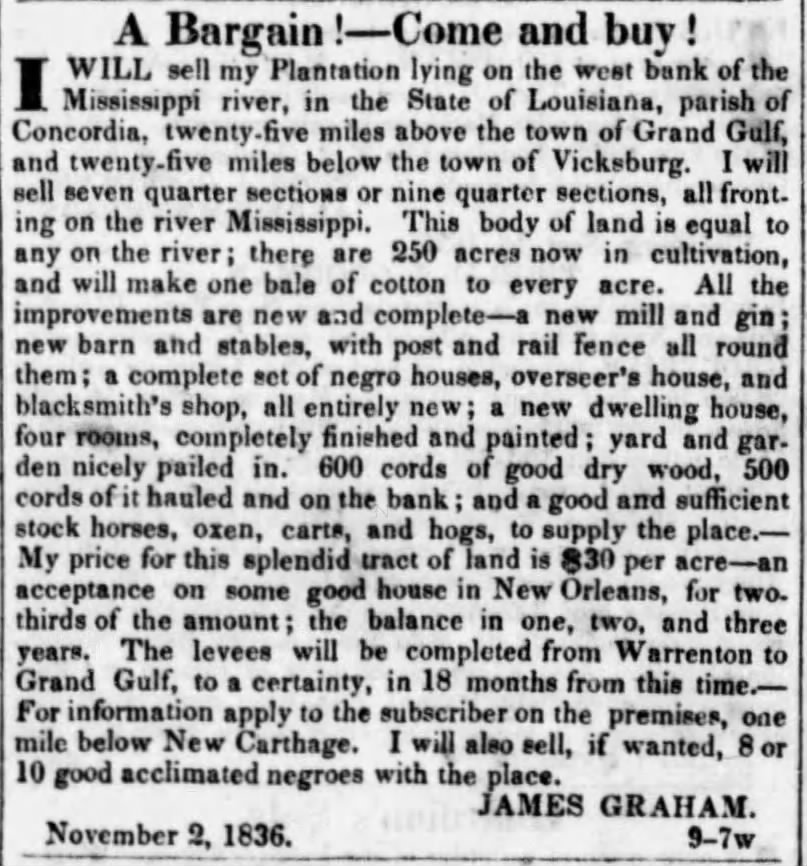
"A Bargain! Come and Buy!" Vicksburg Whig, November 10, 1836

The boat landing and settlement along the right bank of the Mississippi River opened sometime prior to 1831. There was a Planter's Hotel in the settlement as of 1836. New Carthage was located in Concordia Parish before Madison Parish was set apart in 1838. According to one account it preceded Vidalia as the original Concordia parish seat. A riverboat passenger of 1838 recorded in his diary, "Left Vixburg on th 7th, lay at New Carthage on 8th. Found the citizens preparing for a ball and celebration of 8th Jan. Lay there Sabbath and Monday 8th both for wind."

The Carthage crevasse initially broke through in May 1840, which raised the water level in nearby swampland and eventually reached as far as the Tensas. (A crevasse was essentially a "leak" along the presumed boundary of the river; crevasses were unpredictable and thus problematic for capital investors, albeit often an ecological and geomorphological resource of significant value.) According to the Mississippi Free Trader of Natchez, the crevasse was "about fifty yards in width and about thirty feet deep, from the river to the bayou in the rear of the town. The rupture is below the village, and the water rushes through it with a velocity sufficient to suck in flat boats that coast along that shore. One, laden with hay, was a day or two since drawn in and stove against some timbers and sank. By the present time the rise in the river has probably overflowed the entire front of New Carthage. The irruption of the water through the crevasse has not raised the water in the Roundaway Bayou; it has only augmented the rise lower down and on the Tensas." The opportunity for a government matching grant to improve the levee was ignored until another flood occurred in 1844. As of 1846 the Mississippi River crevasse was continuing to inundate land near New Carthage, so local landowners and businesspeople were attempting to organize funding for a levee improvement project. Potentially navigable inland waterways in the vicinity of New Carthage in 1846 included Roundaway Bayou and Bayou Vidal. There was also a stagecoach route to New Carthage in the 1840s.

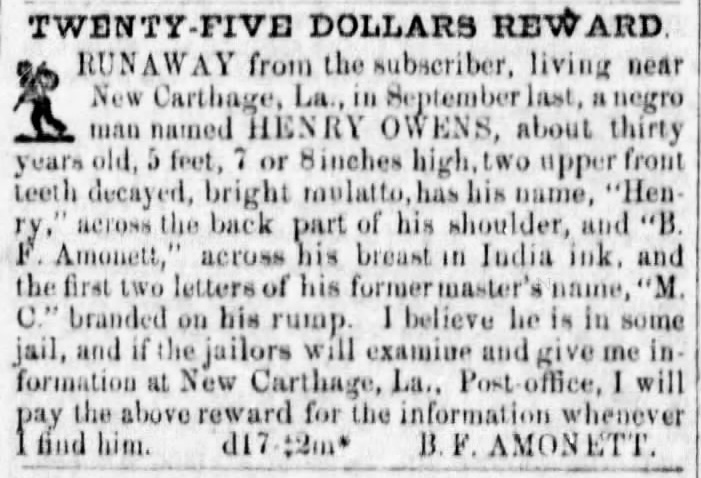
"Twenty-Five Dollars Reward" Vicksburg Whig, January 14, 1852

The six post offices in Madison Parish in 1851 were Chesterfield, Dallas, Milliken's Bend, New Carthage, Richmond, and Young's Point. The steamboat Montgomery burned at New Carthage in 1851, killing two people and destroying 2,000 bales of cotton. In 1852, a planter living near New Carthage was looking for a 30-year-old man named Henry Owen, a runaway slave who could be readily identified if captured, as he had been tattooed and branded with the names of his current and previous legal owner.

The 1859 Mississippi River flood inundated vast stretches of land near Vicksburg, including at Warrenton, Palmyra Settlement, and New Carthage, which at that time had about 200 residents. As of 1859, the plantations around New Carthage were said to be comparatively small and produce staple crops and a modest quantity of cotton. A later account claimed that 10,000 to 15,000 bales of cotton were shipped out of Carthage annually prior to the war. The showboat Banjo had performances scheduled at New Carthage in 1860. By the time of the American Civil War, Madison Parish had a total of five towns of any size: Richmond (the county seat), Tallulah, Milliken's Bend, Delta, and New Carthage.

=== American Civil War ===
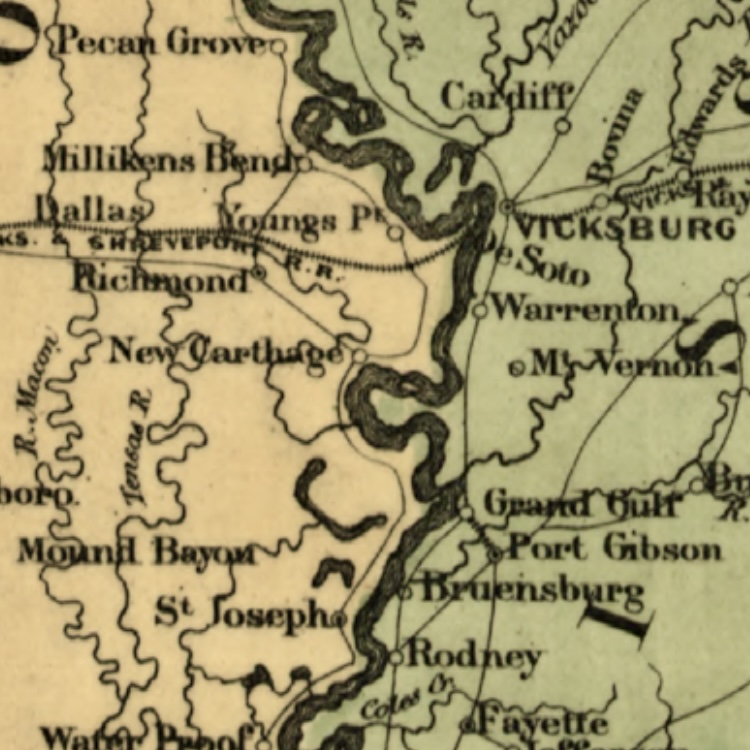
Vicinity of New Carthage, Louisiana c. 1862

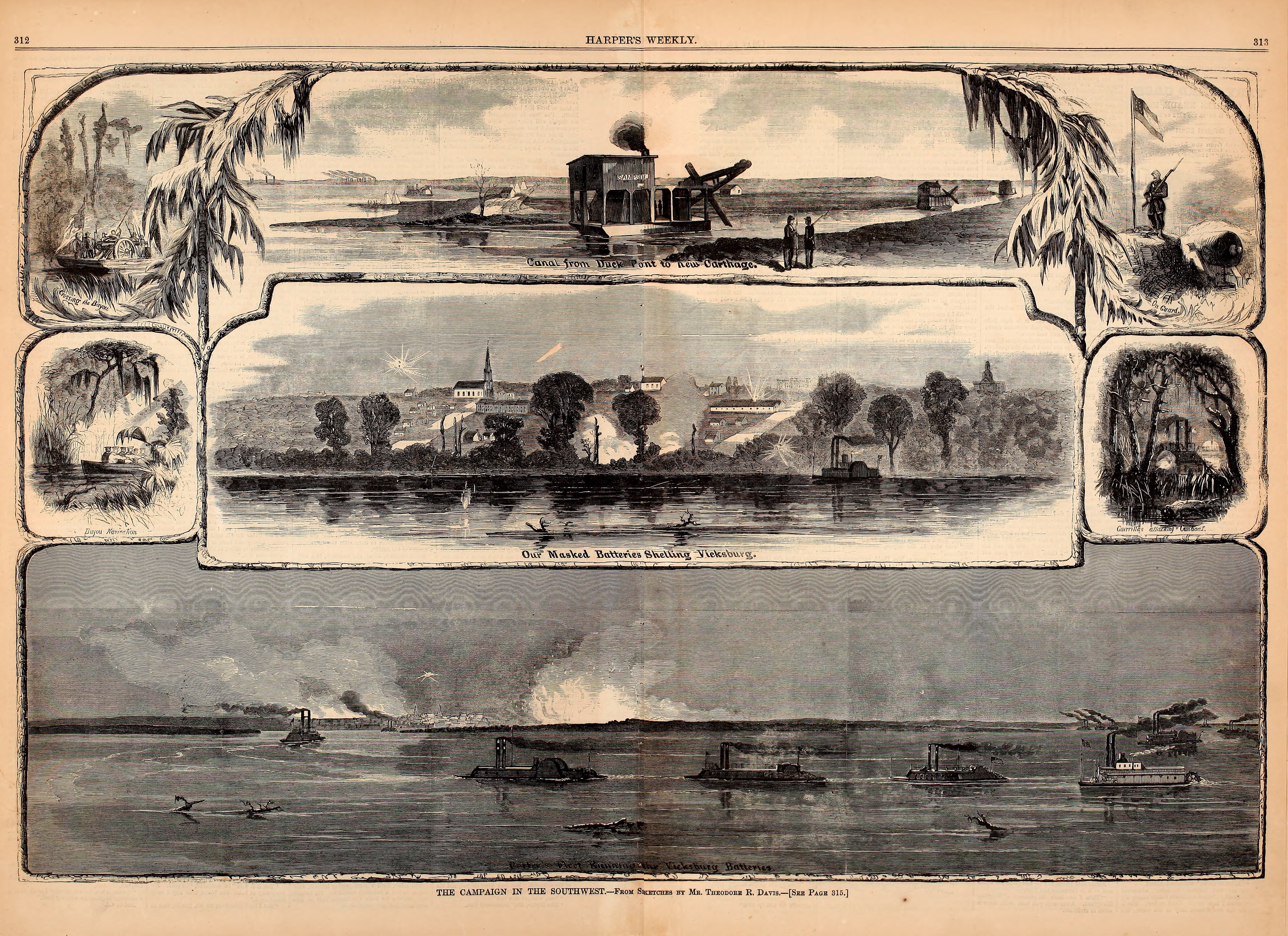
"The Campaign in the Southwest—from Sketches by Mr. Theodore R. Davis" showing Duckport Canal to New Carthage (Harper's Weekly, May 16, 1863)

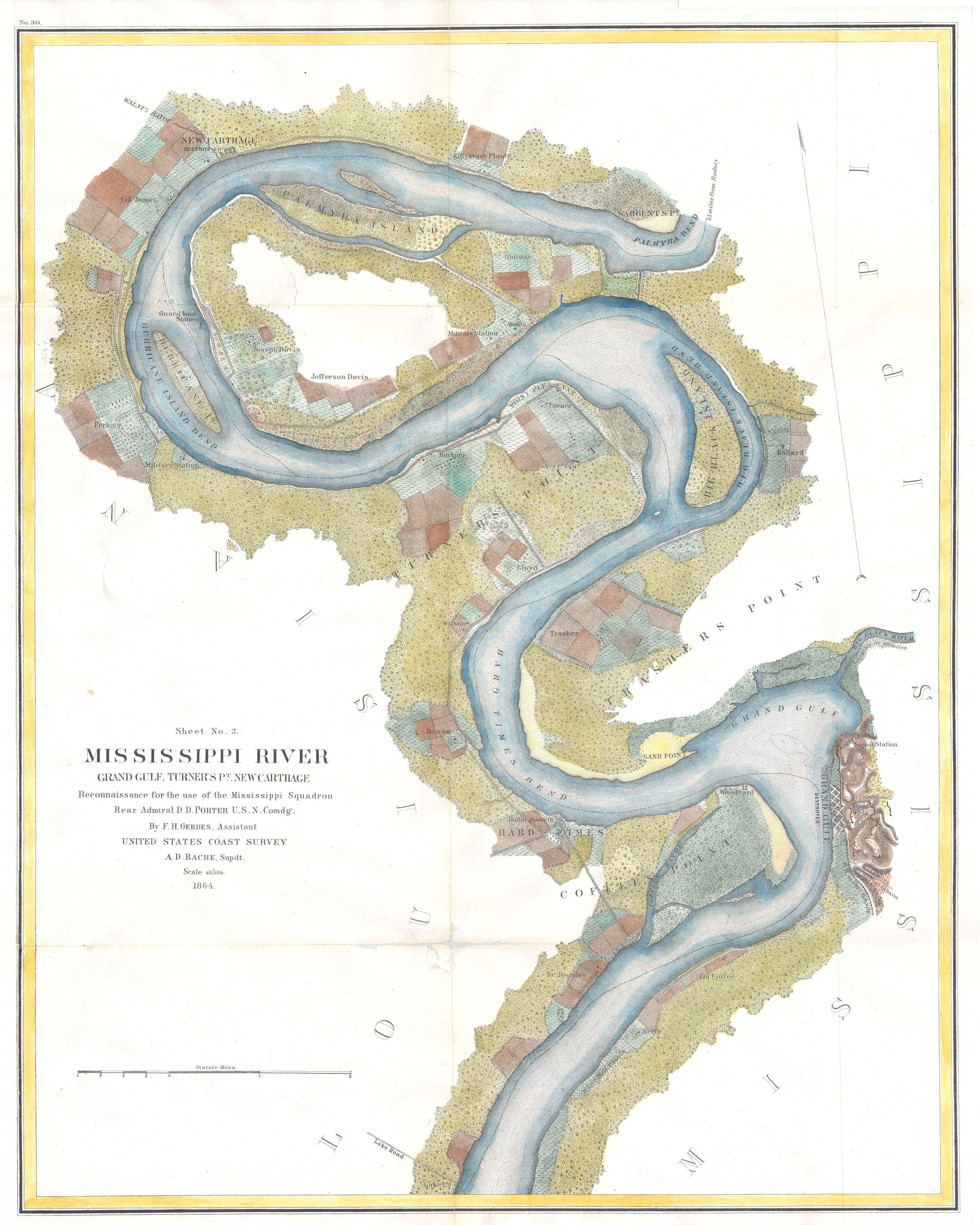
Carthage marked "destroyed" on 1864 map of Mississippi River

During the American Civil War, New Carthage was a valuable landing along the river and thus saw fighting. General Ulysses S. Grant and his troops camped at nearby Point Clear and Ione Plantation. As told by the defeated Confederate governor of Louisiana shortly after the war:

[In 1862], Colonel Harrison, with a small body, composed of the Tensas cavalry and some other troops, were stationed as pickets near New Carthage, a pretty village on the Mississippi River, in Madison Parish. Lake St. Joseph forms a horse-shoe, an arabic arc, about eighteen miles long, which curves with its convex side towards the River, either end about one mile distant from the River, terminating in a small bayou. New Carthage is situated about eight miles above the north end of the lake. Just below New Carthage lies the magnificent estate of Somerset, formerly belonging to Hon. John Perkins, who is now a colonist at Carlotta, in Mexico...Grant now advanced in earnest. Harrison had a sharp fight near New Carthage, with Grant's foremost troops; but finding that the vanguard, who were beaten back at first, grew every moment more and more in numbers and in strength upon his hands, as fast as the armed men did from the serpent's teeth of Cadmus, Harrison was compelled to fall back, burning the bridges and disputing the road, as he slowly retired. The Federals had kept their counsels so close and so well, that no one suspected that Grant was really advancing in all his strength to invest Vicksburg or assail it in the rear. As the Levees were broken, the whole country was submerged except on the ridges. The lake-bank formed one of these ridges, on which ran the only road now practicable."

=== After the war ===
This Reconstruction era map shows Carthage was located directly across the River from Hurricane and Briarfield, plantations belonging to Jefferson Davis and his older brother

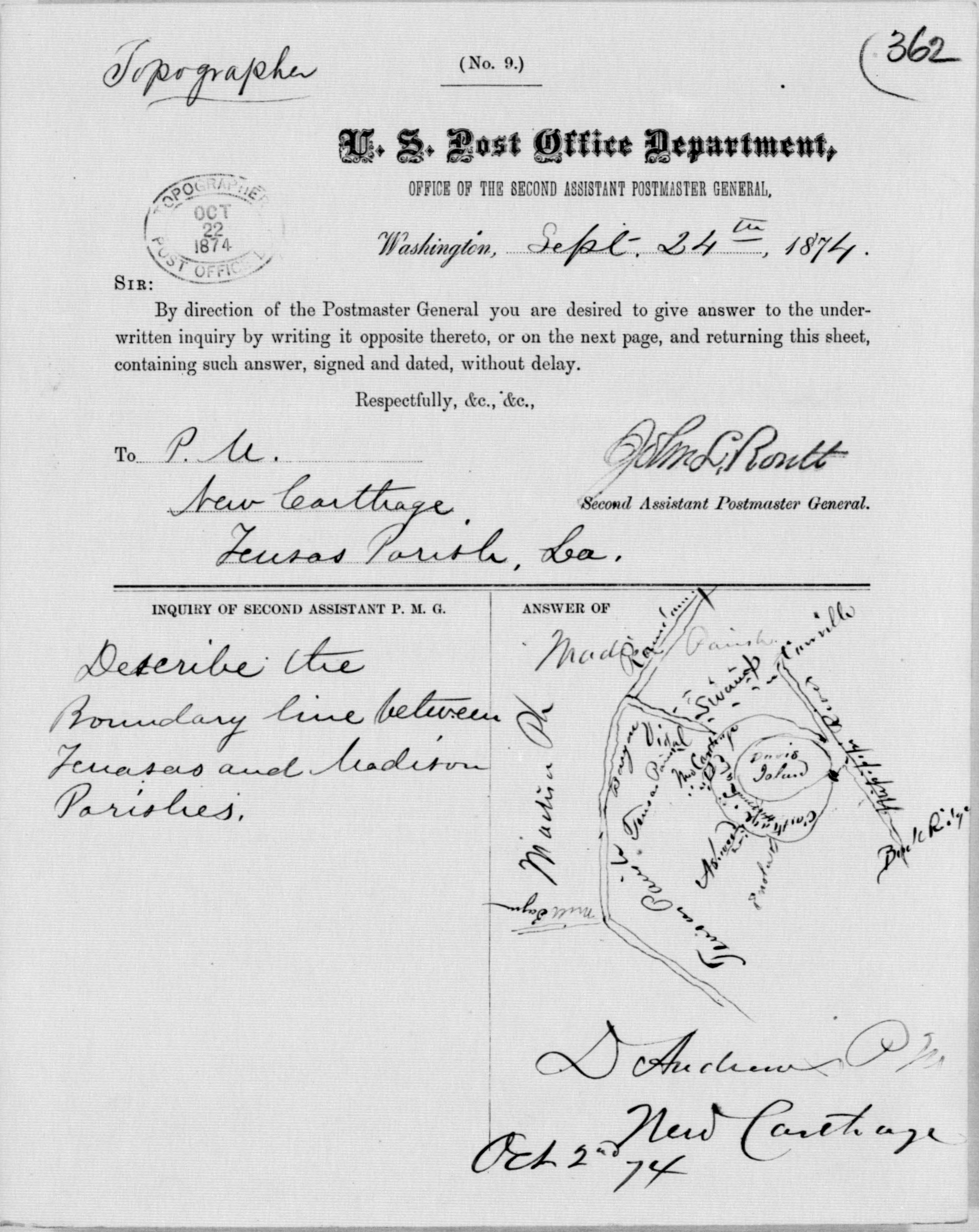
Post office paperwork for New Carthage in 1874

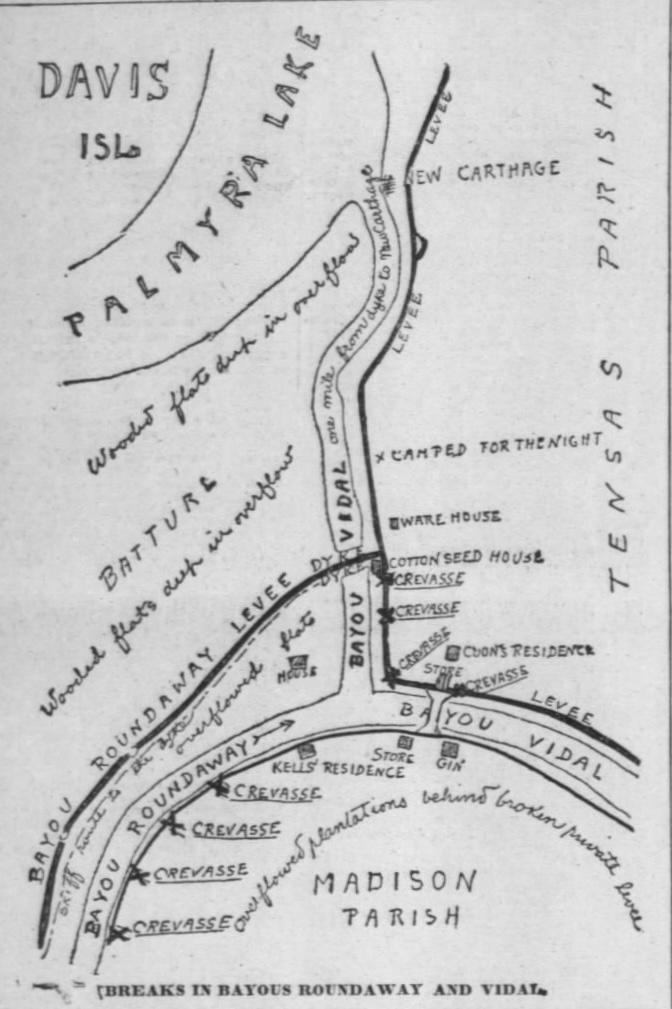
Map of flooding, showing crevasses showing Davis Island ("Breaks in Bayous Roundaway and Vidal" New Orleans Times-Democrat, April 27, 1897)

There was still a post office at New Carthage in 1873. Convict labor was being used to maintain levees in the vicinity of New Carthage in 1878. According to a Mississippi state agricultural report of 1878, the river, the swamp, and the forests were conspiring to reclaim Madison Parish: "...along nearly all of these numerous bayous the lands are high enough to be cultivated, and generally have been so. But the war and the crevasses in the levees since, have caused large quantities of these lands to be abandoned...On the Mississippi river, south of the village of Warrenton...the front lands are low to within five miles of New Carthage. North of Warrenton to the northern limits of the parish, the river banks are under cultivation. The plantations formerly cultivated, along Willow and Joe's bayous, Tensas river, and Bayou Macon, are now, with but few exceptions, abandoned and lying idle, growing up in cockle weeds, cottonwood groves, and swamp underbrush. Back of all the bayous are found the usual low woodlands and swamps, which can scarcely be indicated except on a map."

In 1879, a resident wrote a local newspaper with a current description of the settlement, which had by then become part of Tensas Parish due to a boundary change: "I dare say you never heard of New Carthage, but it is place, and only a place. One boat lands here each Saturday to give us our pork, meal, flour, and needs. We have a postmaster and postoffice, but no mail route or mail boat...Bayou Vidal is the boundary line dividing Tensas and Madison Parishes and fifth and seventh Wards of the respective parishes...In times agone, Bayou Vidal had a bridge across it at Point Clear, but during the war this bridge was destroyed. Since then, during five months of the year, we have to cross by flat boat, paying twenty-five and fifty cents for each crossing, and having delay, trouble, and often lose a mule or wagon in the bayou. During the other seven months, a low water bridge is made and kept up by neighbors. Now this bridge would be a community bridge between Tensas and Madison Parishes, and could be built for eight hundred dollars." McLellan's store at New Carthage burned down in 1879.

Carthage Landing was ultimately wiped off the map by the combination of the American Civil War and Mississippi River flooding and erosion. Interstate 20 now serves the general vicinity. As of 1982, there was a historical plaque on Louisiana Highway 603 south of Mound that marked the approximate location of the lost town.

== See also ==
- Milliken's Bend, Louisiana
- Goodrich's Landing, Louisiana
- Mississippi River in the American Civil War
