= Milliken's Bend, Louisiana =

Extinct settlement along Mississippi River

Coordinates: 32°27′21″N 91°06′17″W

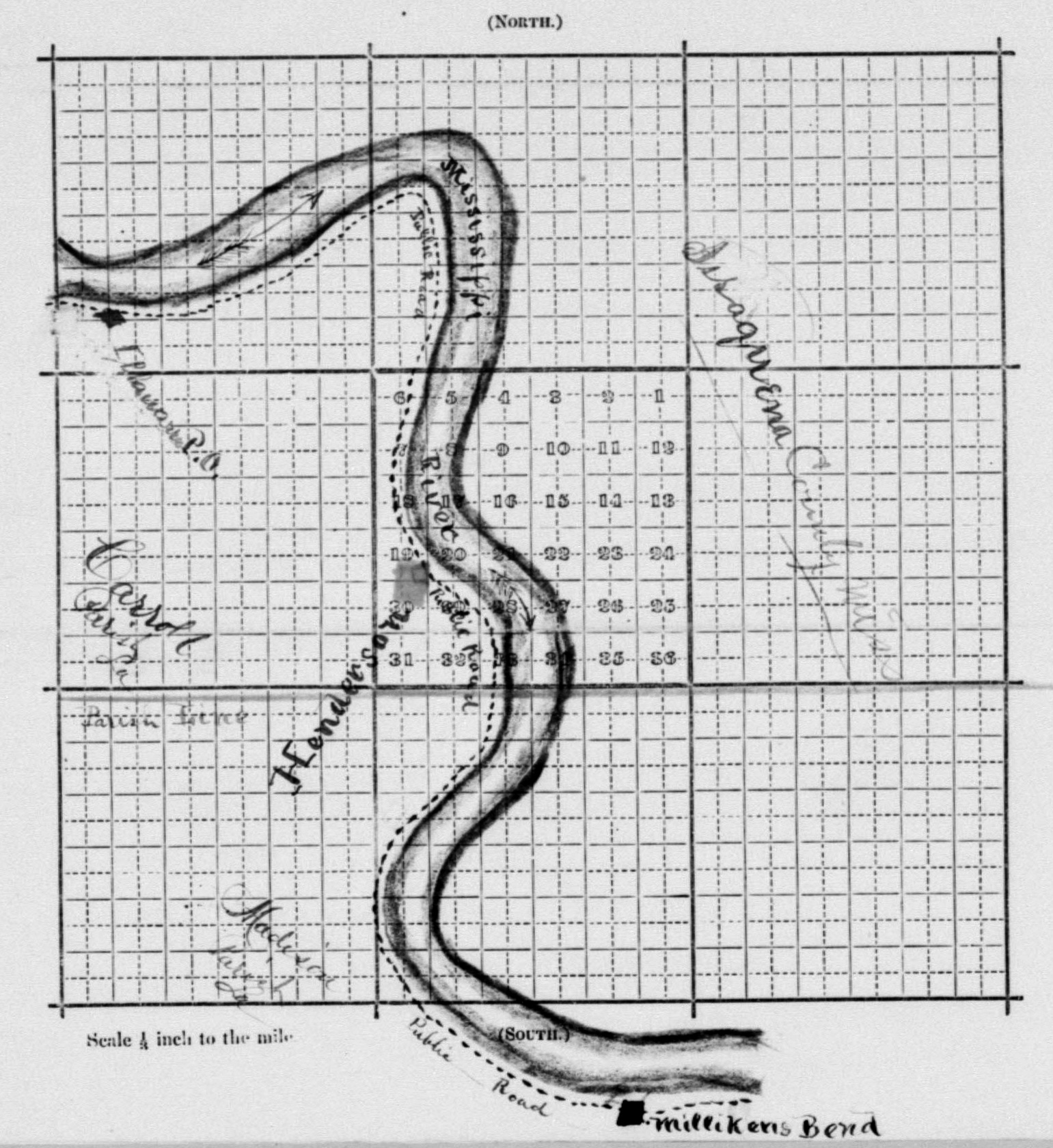
Location of public road from Illawara to Milliken's Bend alongside the Mississippi

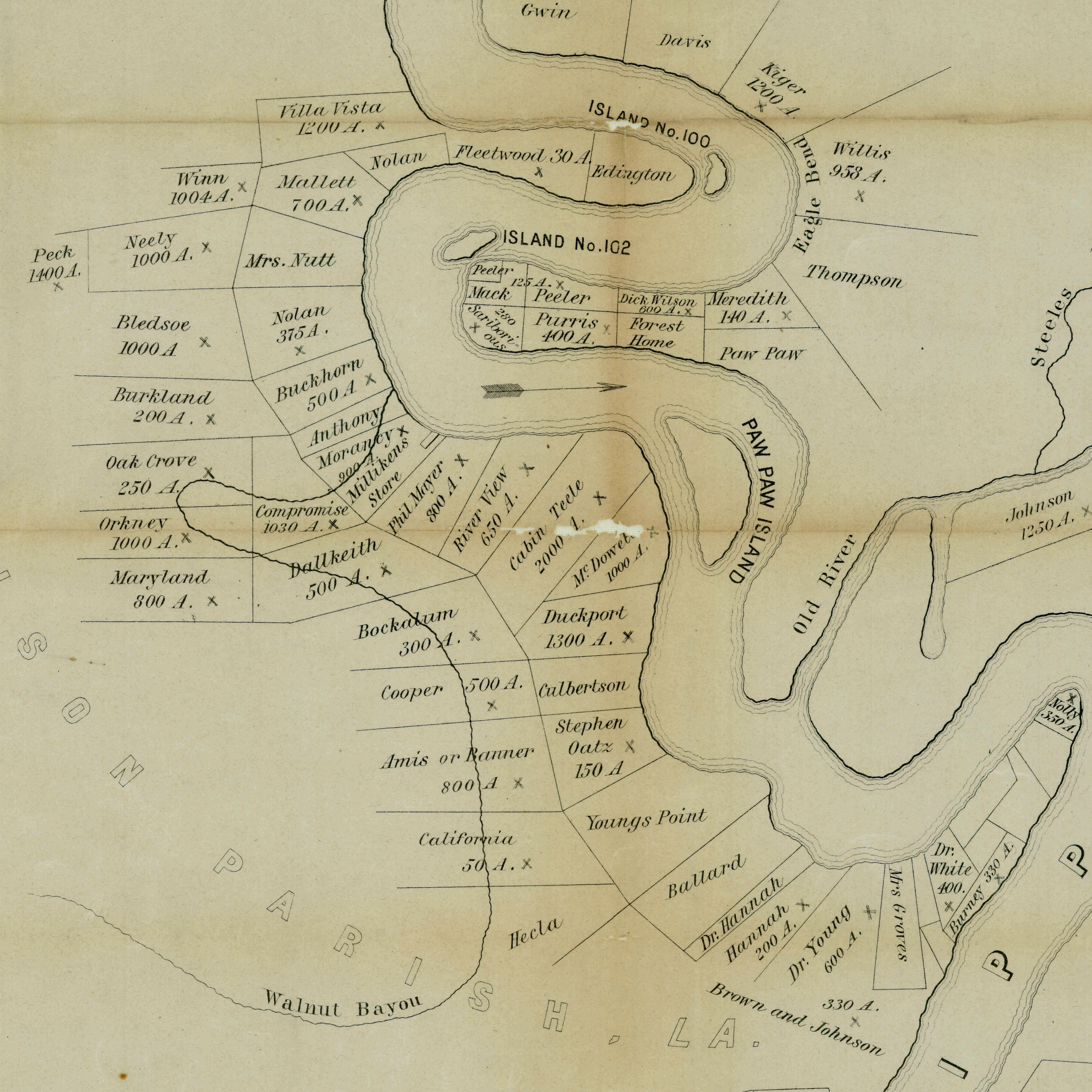
Plantations in the vicinity of Milliken's Bend and location of Milliken's Store, mapped shortly after the American Civil War

Milliken's Bend is an extinct settlement that was located along the Mississippi River in Madison Parish, Louisiana, United States for about 100 years. In its heyday, the village had a boat landing, two streets of businesses, residences, churches, a four-room schoolhouse, a ferryman, and roads connecting it to Lake Providence, and Tallulah.

== History ==
The settlement and the bend in the river were named for Major John Milliken. According to one source, Milliken was "an early settler supposed to have been a member of the pirate band of Captain Bunch" that gave its name to Bunch's Bend (or Bunches Bend). According to a family history, "He studied surveying when a young man, and going to Kentucky with others of the family found employment under the State government, and was rewarded by a grant of land in Louisiana, where he cleared a large and valuable plantation, which was called Milliken's Bend, it being on a loop of the Mississippi River. He owned many slaves, and acquired wealth." Milliken is believed to have made his settlement slightly after 1813. He eventually owned a vast area between Morancy Plantation and Cabin Teele Plantation. Millikin's Settlement was present on Mississippi River guide books intended for use by boat pilots as early as 1827. There is a record in the Madison Parish registers for a slave sale from L. Hyland to John Milliken on July 13, 1832.

Milliken's Bend had regular packet boat service by 1840. According to a history of Methodism in Mississippi, "Our colored missions were growing in importance and popularity, and about 1842 several wealthy planters in the vicinity of Milliken's Bend, in Madison Parish, La., became anxious to have regular ministerial services among their numerous colored people. Mr. [Robert D.] Smith, who had married Miss Ann Mariah McClure in Vicksburg on the 11th of November, 1833, and who now had his home there, was selected for this important missionary field, as it was within twenty-five miles of his place of residence, so that he was not under the necessity of taking his family to the Swamp." Milliken's Bend hosted an official U.S. post office as of 1846. Epidemic cholera killed six people enslaved by Dr. Parker of Milliken's Bend in 1849. The cotton crop in the vicinity of Milliken's Bend suffered badly from the boll weevil in 1852. In 1855 the clerk of the Cavalier & Rathman store at Milliken's Bend got into a shootout with a local plantation overseer over a shipment of freight; the overseer was killed, the clerk was expected to survive his multiple gunshot wounds.

The local cotton plantations shipped 19,000 bales out of Milliken's Bend in 1857. The settlement supported a dry-goods store in 1857, and a French-language travel guide published 1859 described it as a colony of planters, a similar to the nearby Tompkin's Settlement, but more important. There was a schoolhouse "with four large and commodious rooms, play ground, &c" in Milliken's Bend in 1860. The town also supported a Catholic Church, two streets of businesses, and had several roads connecting it to nearby settlements. According to a history of Milliken's Bend written by a Louisiana Tech student in 1941, Milliken's Bend was also accessible from Eagle Bend by "the ferry, operated by old Ned Thompson, a Negro, that made regular trips across the River."

The town formally incorporated in 1861. During the American Civil War, William T. Sherman used Milliken's Bend as his base for "his ill-fated attempt to storm Chickasaw Bluffs and capture Vicksburg." John McClernand's XIII Corps camped at Milliken's Bend in March 1863. In 1863 Milliken's Bend was the site of the Battle of Milliken's Bend, when Confederate general Dick Taylor, son of former U.S. president Zachary Taylor, and H. E. McCulloch's Texas Division unsuccessfully attacked the post. There was a U.S. Army hospital there in 1864.

After the end of Reconstruction, Milliken's Bend was a departure point for black families migrating to Kansas. This group of mass migrants are today known as the Exodusters. According to P. B. S. Pinchback:

Before leaving New Orleans I heard of the Kansas fever among the colored people of this section, but did not attach much importance to it. I was, therefore, surprised on nearing the Delta ferrylanding, to find the banks of the river covered with colored people and their little stores of worldly goods. The crowd awaiting transportation at this point was estimated at 300, but I learn it was swollen to 500 yesterday, when the people took their departure on the St. Louis packet Grand Tower for Kansas. A noticeable feature about their departure was the fact that not one of that vast number was permitted to board the steamer until fare was paid to St. Louis. This fact explodes the erroneous idea that these people are having their expenses paid by some outside agency, and that the movement is not a spontaneous one on their part. Numerous reasons are alleged for this remarkable exodus, but so far as I have been able to learn, the real cause is an apprehension of undefined danger in the near future. They religiously believe that the Constitutional Convention bodes them no good; that it has been called for the express purpose of abridging their rights and liberties, and they are fleeing from the wrath to come. They are absolutely panic stricken. Every road leading to the river is filled with wagons loaded with plunder, and families who seem to think anywhere is better than here. On my way yesterday to Milliken's Bend, I saw a large crowd camped on the landing at Duckport. A still larger crowd awaited transportation at Milliken's Bend. There is no doubt in my mind that this movement has assumed formidable shape, and, unless some means are devised to arrest it, this portion of the State will soon be entirely depopulated of its laboring classes."

By 1880, the Mississippi was eroding the ground on which the town stood, so it was moved wholesale about a mile inland. This new location was reasonably called "New Bend". An Episcopal Church was added to the village. The New Bend, however, was flooded in 1882, and then bypassed by the railroads that were coming through, and 1910 New Bend supported only a small store and a boat landing, and those were gone by the end of the decade. There was a Rosenwald School in the vicinity of Milliken's Bend in the first half of the 20th century.

According to the Friends of the Vicksburg Campaign Trail, the site of Milliken's Bend's can be found at the end of Thomaston Road.

== Additional images ==
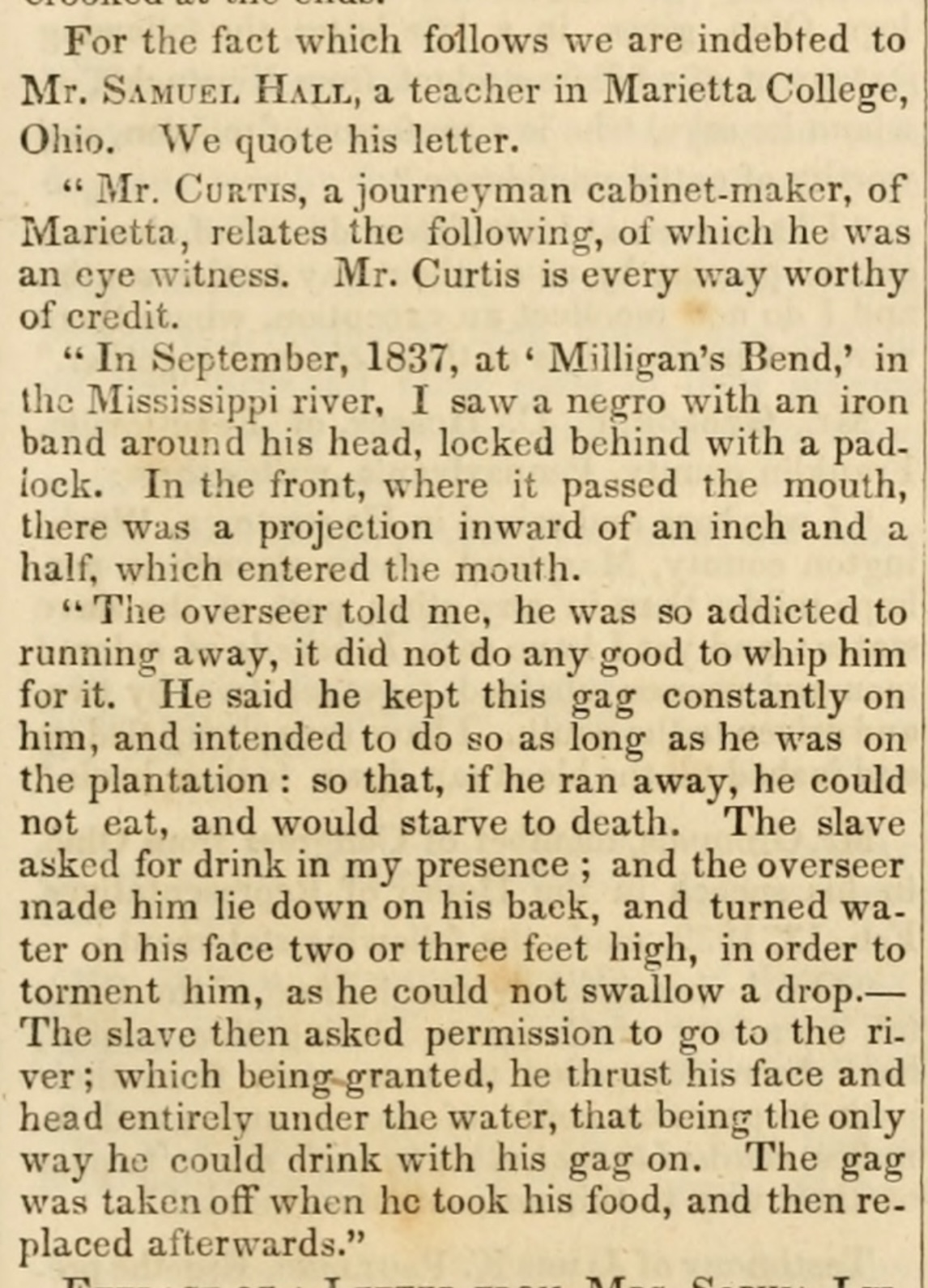
"Milligan's Bend" appearance in the chains and fetters section of American Slavery As It Is

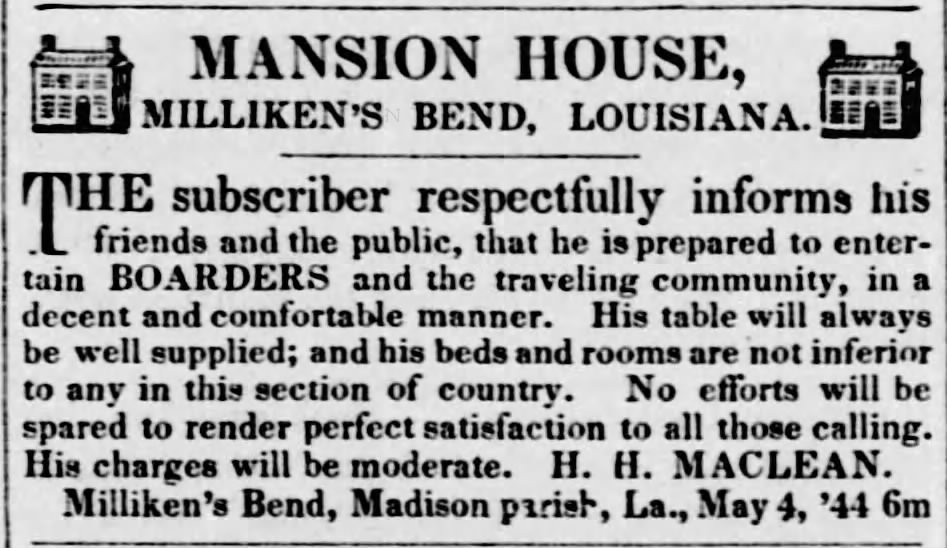
"Mansion House" Southern Reformer, November 2, 1844

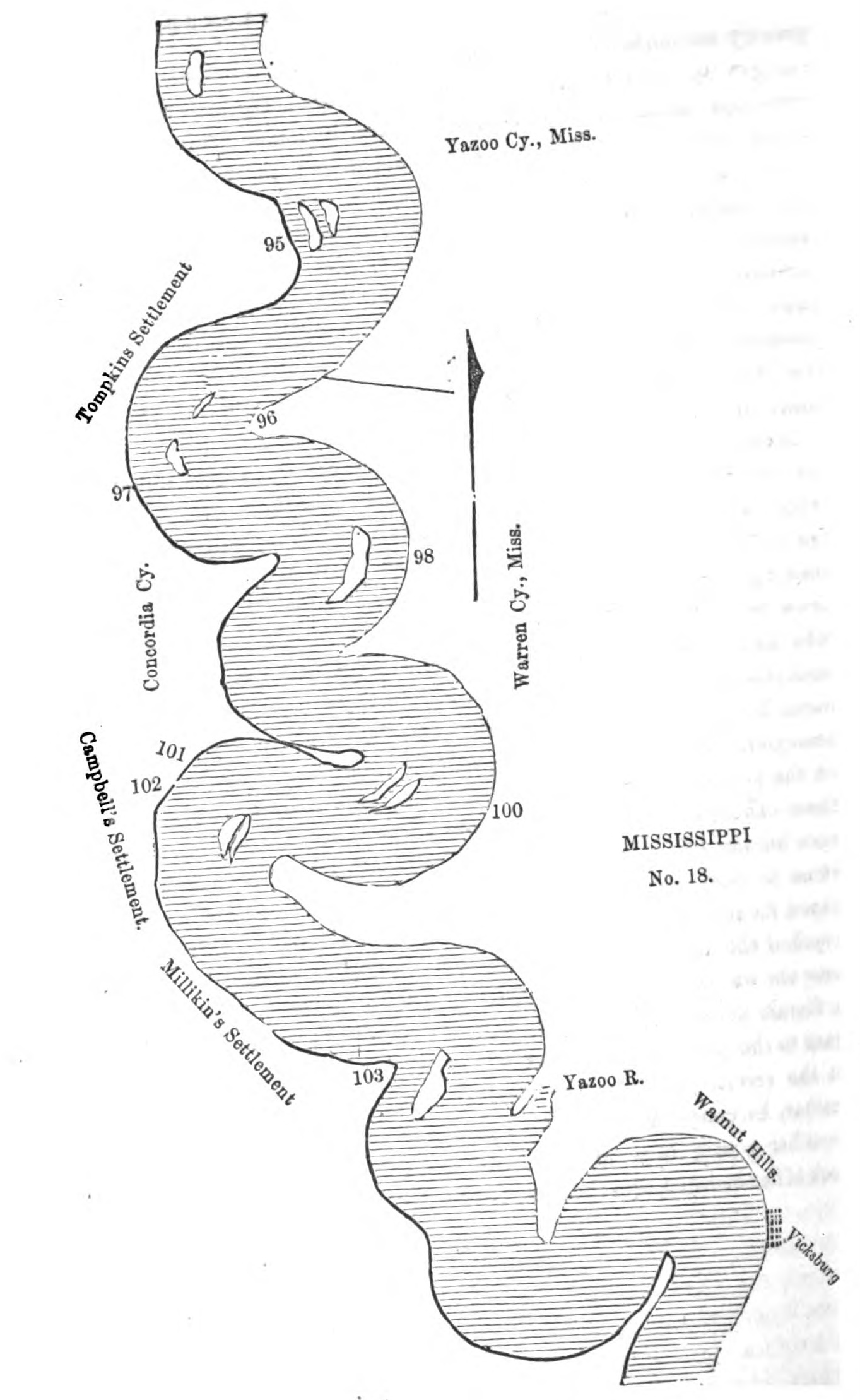
Lloyd's Steamboat Directory Mississippi map No. 18 (1856)

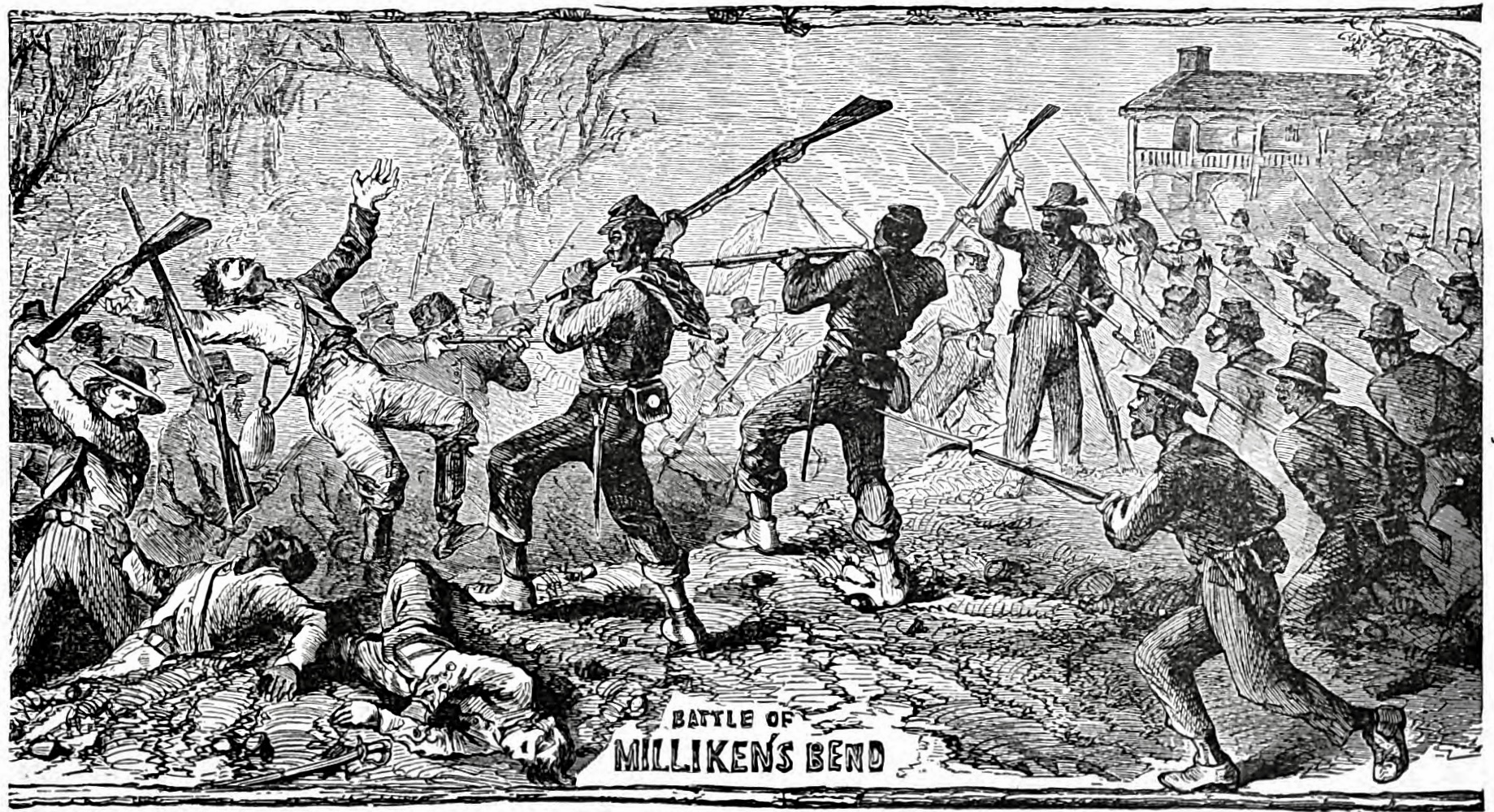
Battle of Milliken's Bend from The Black Phlanx (1887)

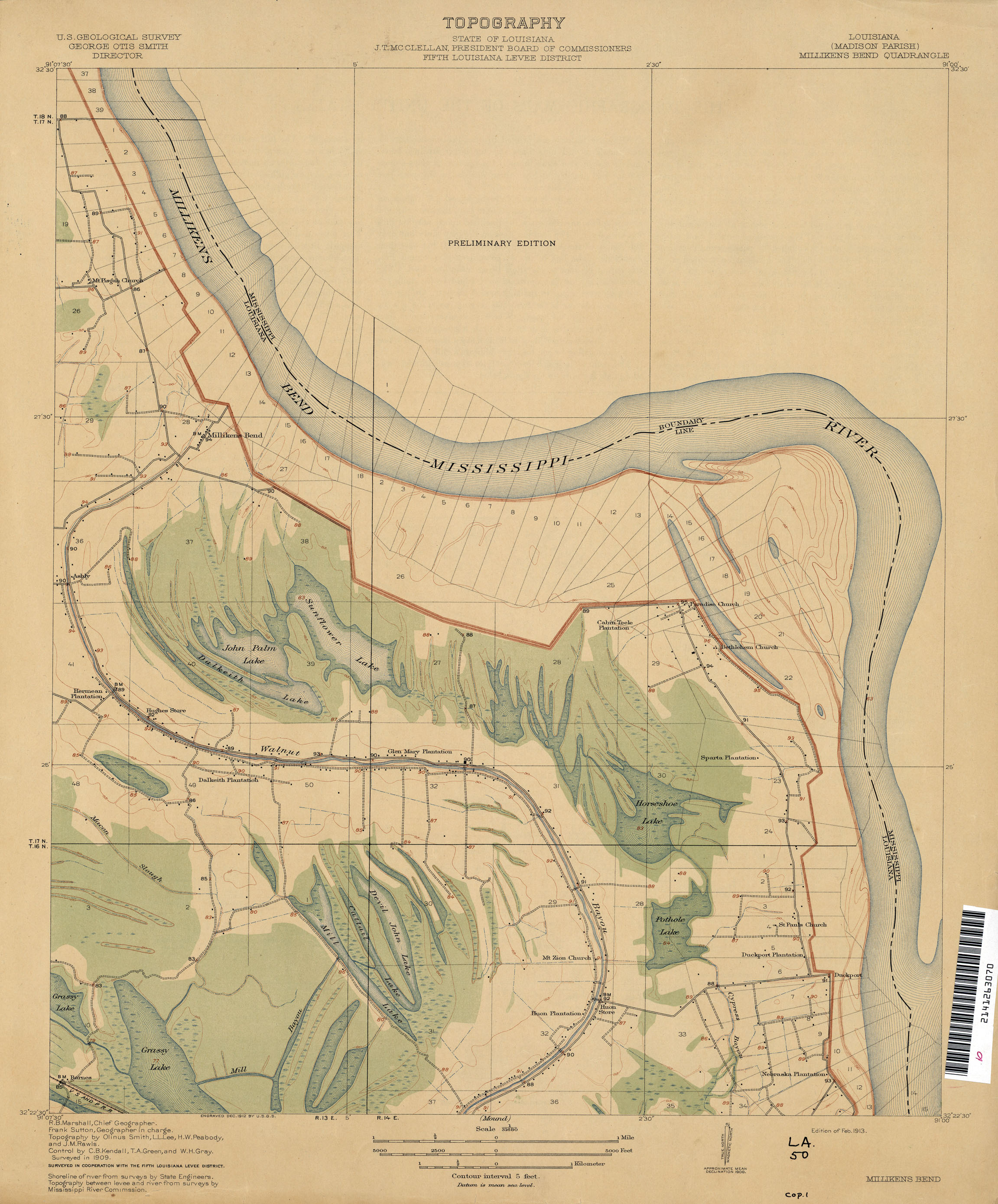
1909 U.S. Geological Survey map of Milliken's Bend (Perry-Castañeda Library Map Collection)

== See also ==
- Goodrich's Landing
- Skipwith's Landing
- Gaines Landing
- Columbia, Arkansas
- Mississippi River in the American Civil War
