= Hermione (Tallulah, Louisiana) =

Historic house in Louisiana, United States

- U.S. National Register of Historic Places
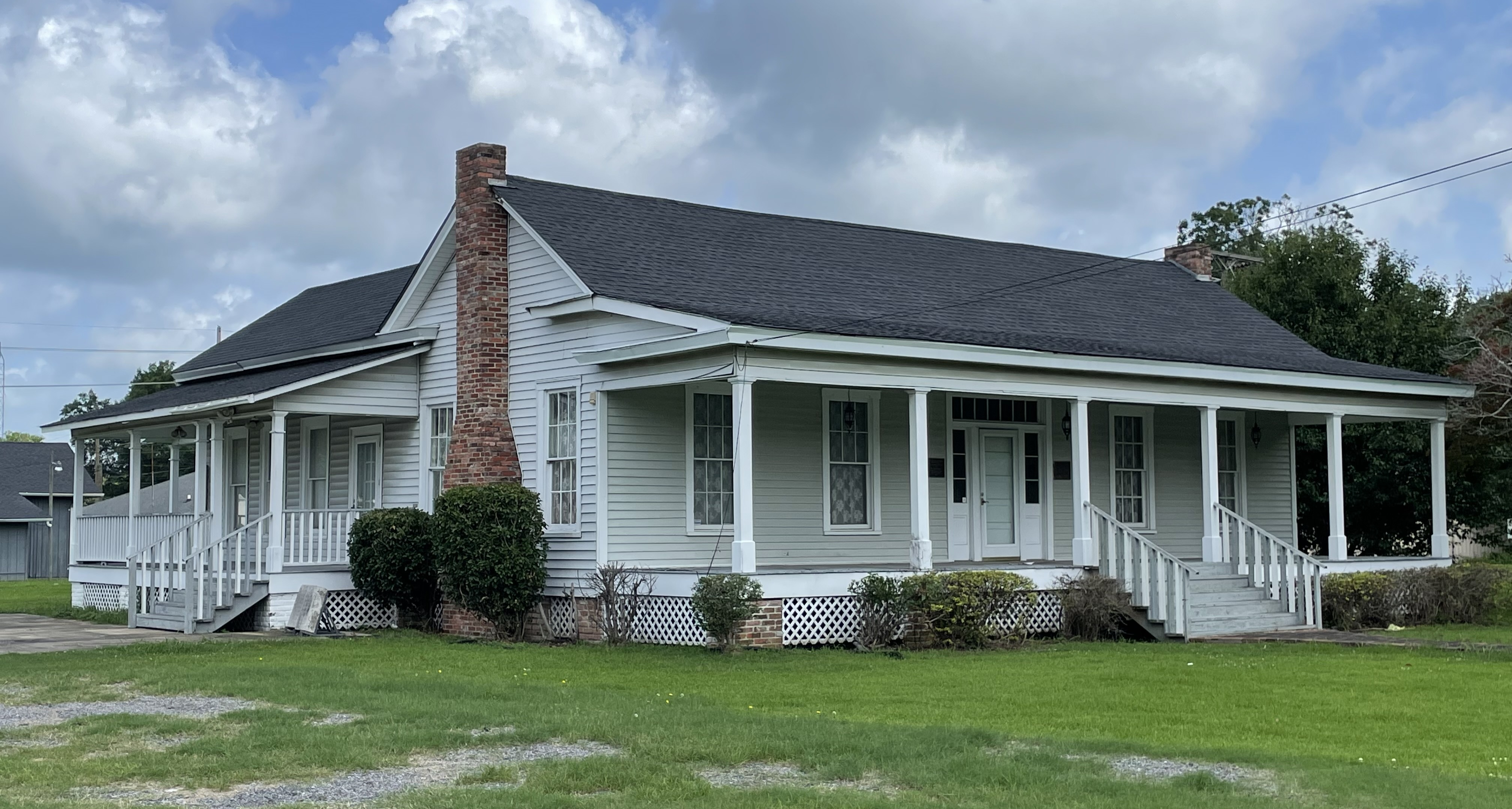
- The museum in 2025

- Location within Louisiana Location within the United States
- Location: 305 North Mulberry Street, Tallulah, Louisiana
- Coordinates: 32°24′35″N 91°11′06″W
- Area: Less than one acre
- Built: c.1855
- Architectural style: Greek Revival, Central-passage house
- NRHP reference No.: 98001422
- Added to NRHP: November 23, 1998

Hermione, now the Hermione Museum, is a Greek Revival-style plantation house built in 1853 or 1855 on Kell Plantation in Madison Parish, Louisiana. In 1997 it was donated to the Madison Historical Society and moved to the parish seat of Tallulah.

In April 1862, General Grant's troops landed at Milliken's Bend before the siege of Vicksburg and occupied the Sparta Plantation. During the course of the siege, Union forces confiscated the Hermione House, on the Kell Plantation, for use as a federal hospital. They also took over some other plantation homes in the area. The Hermione House is one of only four antebellum structures standing in Madison Parish.

Unlike many other houses in the area, it was not destroyed by Grant during the Vicksburg Campaign because it was being used as a Union hospital. The one-story building is now operated as a museum and offices for the Madison Historical Society, to which it was donated in 1997. Afterward, it was moved to its current location on North Mulberry Street (serving in the city as US 80).

Among the museum's exhibits is one devoted to Madam C. J. Walker, born free soon after the war as Sarah Breedlove near Delta, Louisiana. She is known as the first African-American woman to become a self-made millionaire, achieving this in the 20th century. The Hermione Museum is a site listed on the Louisiana African American Heritage Trail.

The house was originally listed on the National Register of Historic Places on October 17, 1988, at its former location on the Kell plantation. After the building was successfully moved and adapted for use by the historical society, it was relisted on November 23, 1998. It is located at 305 N. Mulberry Street (also serving as US 80).

== See also ==
- List of plantations in Louisiana
- National Register of Historic Places listings in Madison Parish, Louisiana
