= Curtis Pollard =

Louisiana reconstruction era American politician

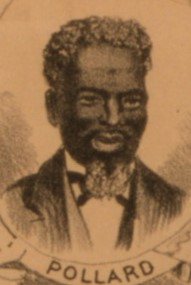

Louisiana State Senate
- In office 1868–1870

Louisiana State Senate
- In office 1872–1876

Personal details
- Born: 1806/7 Virginia
- Party: Republican

Curtis Pollard was a minister, farmer, store keeper and state legislator who served in the Louisiana State Senate during the Reconstruction era.

== Biography ==
Pollard was born in Virginia and in the 1870 United States census Pollard was listed as being aged 63. He was a Baptist preacher who travelled to Madison Parish, Louisiana in 1864 to start a farm. He was successful at farming and obtained recognition in the local community leading to his selection as convention delegate and then his senatorial nomination.

He was a delegate to the Louisiana constitutional conventions in 1867 and 1868 representing Franklin Parish and Madison Parish and in 1867 he served on the Committee on the Executive Department.

Pollard was nominated to run for the state senate by the Republicans and was elected to the Louisiana State Senate for the 1868 to 1870 session. He was almost the nomination for the United States senator for Louisiana which he lost to Oscar James Dunn after interrupting his own potential nominator. At the time Pollard was described as "a black man, uncompromisingly and a Republican equally uncompromising". In his first senatorial session he served on a Committee for Auditing and Supervising the Expenses of the Senate as well as one for charitable and public institutions.

For the 1870 to 1872 senatorial session he lost the nomination to William L. McMillen but Pollard decided to run as an independent Republican candidate, but lost to McMillen. He was living in Delta, Louisiana at the time.

Pollard was then again elected to serve in the Louisiana State Senate in 1872 representing the 17th senatorial district and he served until 1876.

Pollard was a partner in the Mississippi River Packet Company which was a black-owned enterprise. He had also been a parish police jury and ran a grocery store until 1872. He was a founder of the Bank of Delta in February 1874.

He left his wife and children unwillingly when he was forced by armed men onto a steamboat in 1879 whilst helping emigrants leave to Kansas.

== See also ==
- African American officeholders from the end of the Civil War until before 1900
