= Brushy Bayou =

Stream in Madison Parish, Louisiana

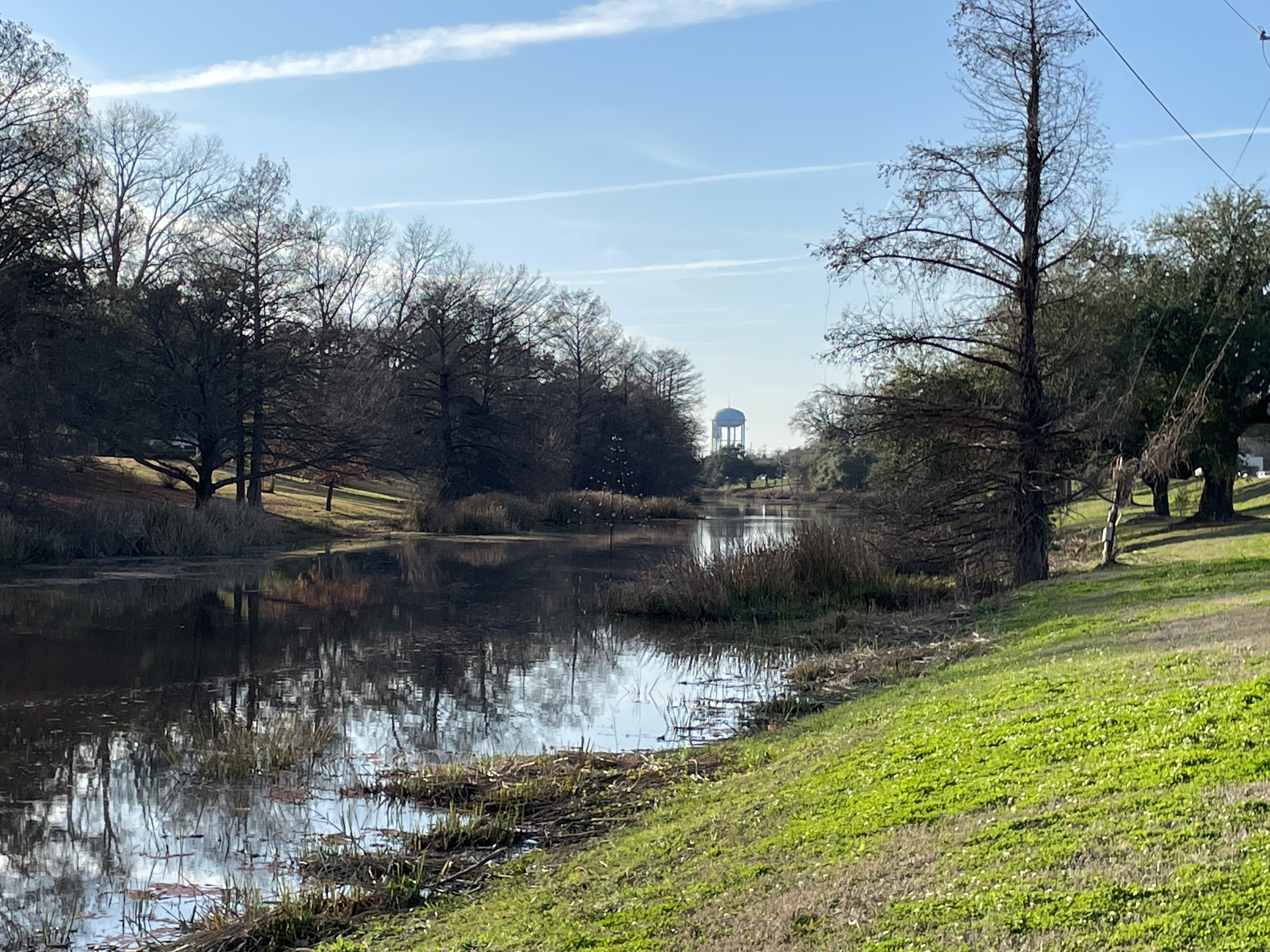

- Location within Louisiana Location within the United States
- Location: Madison Parish, Louisiana, United States
- Type: Bayou
- Part of: Tensas River basin
- Primary outflows: Roundaway Bayou
- Basin countries: United States
- Settlements: Tallulah, Richmond

Brushy Bayou is a bayou (stream) in Madison Parish, Louisiana, United States. The bayou flows through the Tallulah,–Richmond area and joins Roundaway Bayou near Richmond; it is part of the Tensas River basin.

== Course ==
Topographic and transportation maps show Brushy Bayou running through the Tallulah–Richmond area and meeting Roundaway Bayou near Richmond. The bayou parallels portions of Louisiana Highway 602; the National Register nomination for Crescent Plantation notes that “Brushy Bayou runs in front of the plantation residence” and that LA 602 follows the route of Brushy and Walnut bayous.

== History ==
During the Vicksburg campaign, Union forces crossed Brushy Bayou en route to the Battle of Richmond on June 15, 1863, after which the town of Richmond was burned. A reconnaissance column also skirmished at Richmond on March 31, 1863, near the bayou; marker texts summarize the action. Nineteenth-century local accounts likewise place “old Richmond” where Brushy Bayou meets Roundaway Bayou.

== Hydrology and monitoring ==
The U.S. Geological Survey maintains a stream gage titled “Brushy Bayou at Tallulah, La.” (station 07369455), providing water-level and related data for the bayou. Nearby USGS stations monitor Roundaway Bayou, into which Brushy Bayou flows.

== See also ==
- Roundaway Bayou
- Tensas River
- Tallulah, Louisiana
- Richmond, Louisiana
