= Delta, Louisiana =

- Village
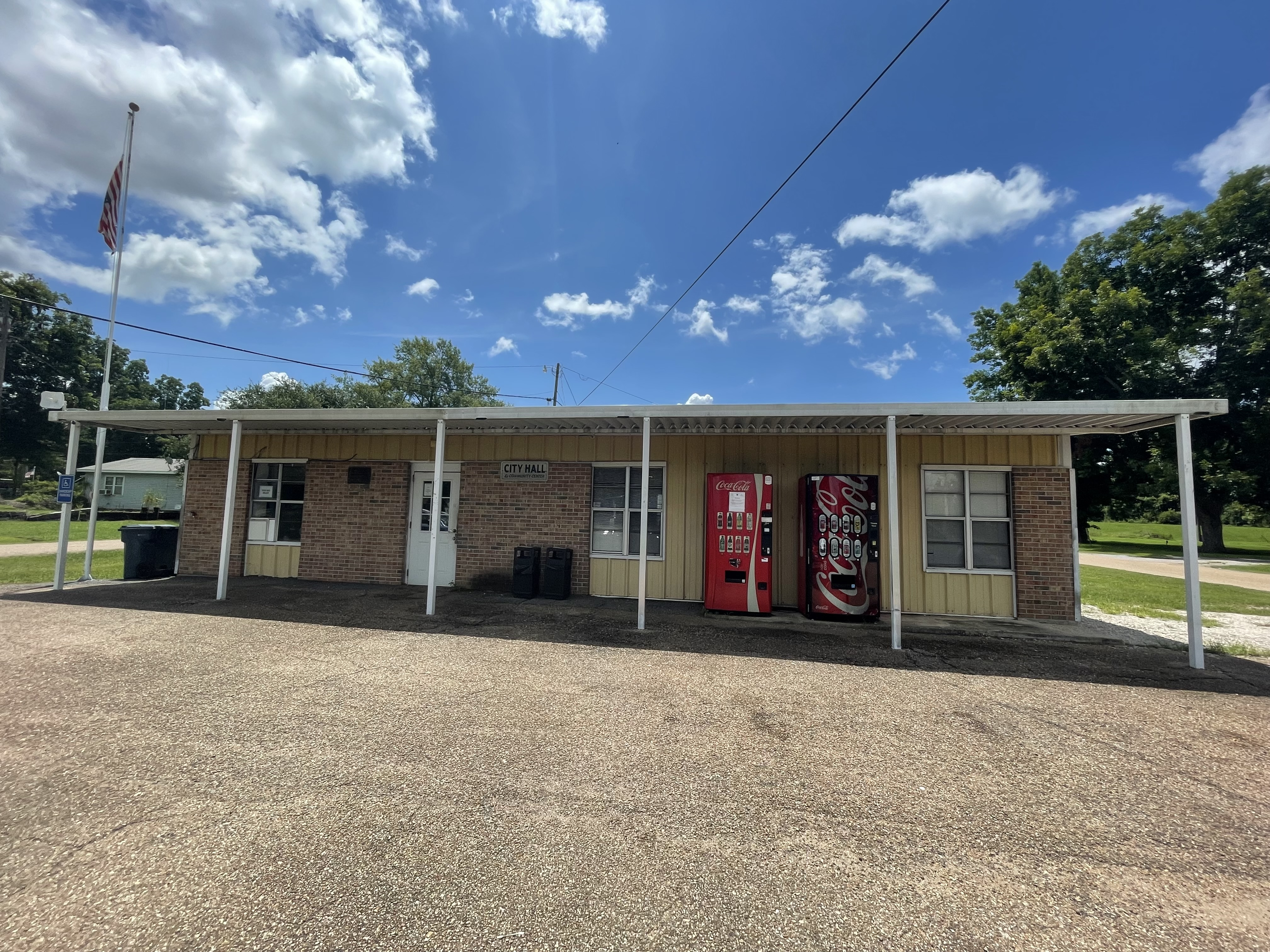
- City Hall

- Location in Madison Parish, Louisiana

- Location of Louisiana in the United States
- Coordinates: 32°19′32″N 90°58′12″W
- Country: United States
- State: Louisiana
- Parish: Madison

Government
  - Type: Mayor
  - Body: Board of Aldermen
  - Mayor: Kathy Davis

Area
  - Total: 4.61 sq mi (11.93 km^{2})
  - Land: 4.44 sq mi (11.49 km^{2})
  - Water: 0.17 sq mi (0.43 km^{2})
- Elevation: 85 ft (26 m)

Population (2020)
  - Total: 232
  - Density: 52.3/sq mi (20.19/km^{2})
- Time zone: UTC-6 (CST)
  - Summer (DST): UTC-5 (CDT)
- ZIP Code: 71233
- Area code: 318
- FIPS code: 22-20330
- GNIS feature ID: 2407439

Delta is a village in Madison Parish, Louisiana, United States. The population was 232 at the 2020 census. It is part of the Tallulah Micropolitan Statistical Area.

Delta is a site on the Louisiana African American Heritage Trail.

== History ==
Across the Mississippi River from Vicksburg, Delta includes the Louisiana site of Grant's Canal, an 1862–63 Union engineering project across De Soto Point intended to bypass Confederate batteries at Vicksburg. A preserved remnant is interpreted as the Grant’s Canal unit of Vicksburg National Military Park.

During the Vicksburg campaign, Union troops burned the then-parish seat of Richmond on June 15, 1863. Local histories note that the parish seat later moved to Delta during Reconstruction before relocating to Tallulah.

== Geography ==
Delta is located on the eastern edge of Madison Parish and the state of Louisiana. It sits on the inside of a bend in the Mississippi River known as Delta Point, across which is the city of Vicksburg, Mississippi.

According to the United States Census Bureau, the village of Delta has a total area of 4.61 square miles (11.9 km^{2}), of which 4.44 square miles (11.5 km^{2}) are land and 0.17 square miles (0.44 km^{2}), or 3.65%, are water.

=== Climate ===
The climate in this area is characterized by relatively high temperatures and evenly distributed precipitation throughout the year. According to the Köppen Climate Classification system, Delta has a Humid subtropical climate, abbreviated "Cfa" on climate maps.

Climate data for Delta, Louisiana
Month	Jan	Feb	Mar	Apr	May	Jun	Jul	Aug	Sep	Oct	Nov	Dec	Year
Mean daily maximum °C (°F)	14 (58)	17 (63)	22 (71)	26 (78)	29 (84)	32 (90)	33 (92)	33 (92)	31 (87)	26 (79)	21 (69)	16 (61)	25 (77)
Mean daily minimum °C (°F)	2 (35)	3 (38)	7 (45)	11 (52)	16 (60)	20 (68)	22 (71)	21 (70)	18 (65)	12 (54)	7 (45)	3 (38)	12 (53)
Average precipitation mm (inches)	150 (5.9)	120 (4.8)	160 (6.2)	140 (5.4)	130 (5.3)	100 (4)	100 (4.1)	81 (3.2)	89 (3.5)	100 (4)	120 (4.8)	160 (6.2)	1,460 (57.5)
Source: Weatherbase

== Demographics ==
Historical population
Census	Pop.	Note	%±
1880	399		—
1890	320		−19.8%
1940	183		—
1950	150		−18.0%
1960	111		−26.0%
1970	153		37.8%
1980	295		92.8%
1990	234		−20.7%
2000	239		2.1%
2010	284		18.8%
2020	232		−18.3%
2025 (est.)	208	▼	−10.3%
U.S. Decennial Census

=== 2020 census ===
Delta racial composition
Race	Num.	Perc.
White (non-Hispanic)	193	83.19%
Black or African American (non-Hispanic)	23	9.91%
Other/Mixed	8	3.45%
Hispanic or Latino	8	3.45%

As of the 2020 United States census, there were 232 people, 104 households, and 89 families residing in the village.

=== 2000 census ===
As of the census of 2000, there were 239 people, 101 households, and 62 families residing in the village. The population density was 80.2 inhabitants per square mile (31.0/km^{2}). There were 111 housing units at an average density of 37.3 per square mile (14.4/km^{2}). The racial makeup of the village was 94.98% White, 2.51% African American, 0.42% Native American, 0.42% from other races, and 1.67% from two or more races. Hispanic or Latino of any race were 3.35% of the population.

There were 101 households, out of which 32.7% had children under the age of 18 living with them, 51.5% were married couples living together, 8.9% had a female householder with no husband present, and 38.6% were non-families. 33.7% of all households were made up of individuals, and 12.9% had someone living alone who was 65 years of age or older. The average household size was 2.37 and the average family size was 3.00.

In the village, the population was spread out, with 25.9% under the age of 18, 12.6% from 18 to 24, 28.0% from 25 to 44, 22.2% from 45 to 64, and 11.3% who were 65 years of age or older. The median age was 34 years. For every 100 females, there were 82.4 males. For every 100 females age 18 and over, there were 86.3 males.

The median income for a household in the village was $29,750, and the median income for a family was $33,214. Males had a median income of $37,708 versus $18,929 for females. The per capita income for the village was $15,346. About 9.6% of families and 12.5% of the population were below the poverty line, including 14.6% of those under the age of eighteen and 38.9% of those 65 or over.

== Arts and culture ==
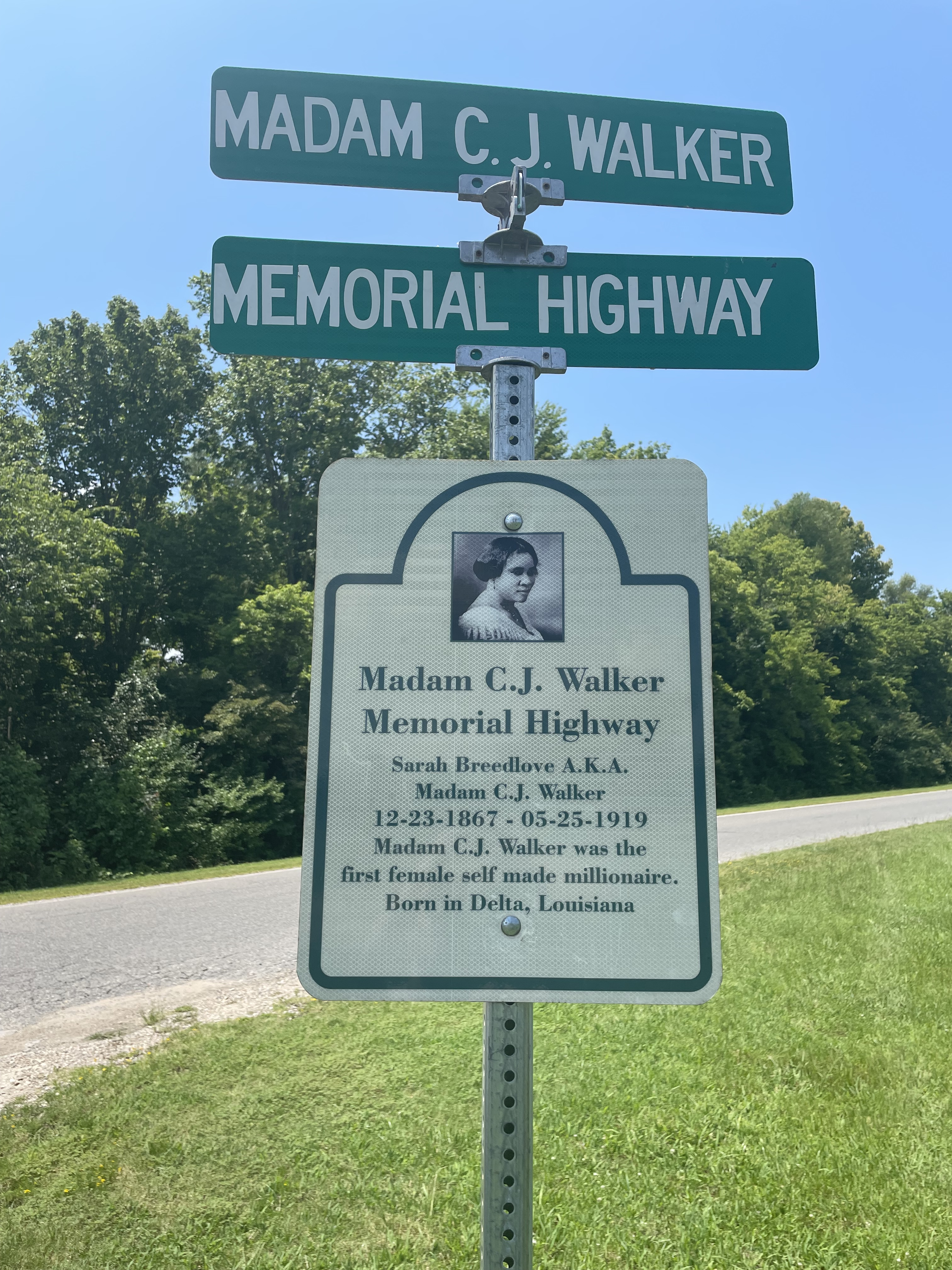
Madam C.J. Walker Memorial Highway in Delta

As the birthplace of African-American entrepreneur Madam C. J. Walker, the first American woman to become a millionaire by her own business achievements, Delta has been included as one of 26 sites on the Louisiana African American Heritage Trail.

== Education ==
Public education is provided by the Madison Parish School District with campuses in nearby Tallulah, including Tallulah Elementary School (PK–2), Wright Elementary School (3–5), Madison Middle School (6–8), Madison High School (9–12), and Christian Acres Alternative (6–12). The private school Tallulah Academy Delta Christian School also serves the area.

== Media ==
KSBU radio station is located in Delta.

== Infrastructure ==
=== Transportation ===
Interstate 20 and U.S. Route 80 cross Delta east–west; state route LA 3218 connects US-80 with the Old U.S. 80 bridge approach.

Two Mississippi River crossings align at Delta: the 1930 Old Vicksburg Bridge (a cantilever truss now used for rail traffic and special events, closed to motor vehicles since 1998) and the 1973 Vicksburg Bridge carrying I-20 and US-80.

== Notable people ==
- George H. Bradfield, associate justice of the Colorado Supreme Court
- Curtis Pollard, state legislator who served in the Louisiana State Senate during the Reconstruction era
- Madam C. J. Walker, African-American hair care entrepreneur, tycoon and philanthropist
