= Tallulah, Louisiana =

Location in Madison Parish

- City
- Street view

- Location in Madison Parish, Louisiana

- Location within Louisiana Location within the United States
- Coordinates: 32°24′24″N 91°11′30″W
- Country: United States
- State: Louisiana
- Parish: Madison

Government
  - Mayor: Yvonne Lewis

Area
  - Total: 2.78 sq mi (7.21 km^{2})
  - Land: 2.78 sq mi (7.21 km^{2})
  - Water: 0 sq mi (0.00 km^{2})
- Elevation: 85 ft (26 m)

Population (2020)
  - Total: 6,286
  - Density: 2,258.7/sq mi (872.07/km^{2})
- Time zone: UTC-6 (CST)
  - Summer (DST): UTC-5 (CDT)
- ZIP Codes: 71282, 71284
- FIPS code: 22-74690
- GNIS feature ID: 2405566
- Website: cityoftallulah.org

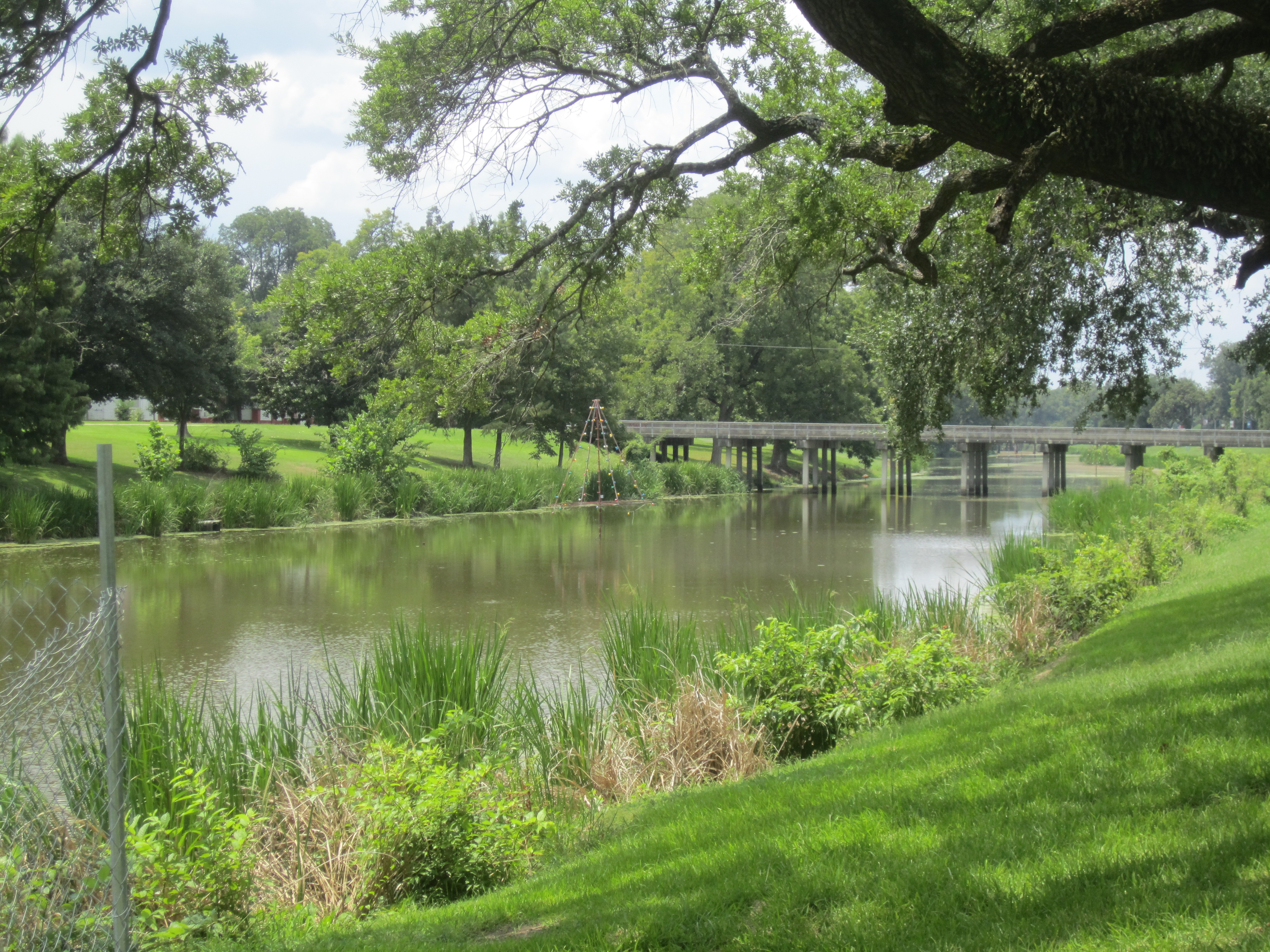
Brushy Bayou in Tallulah

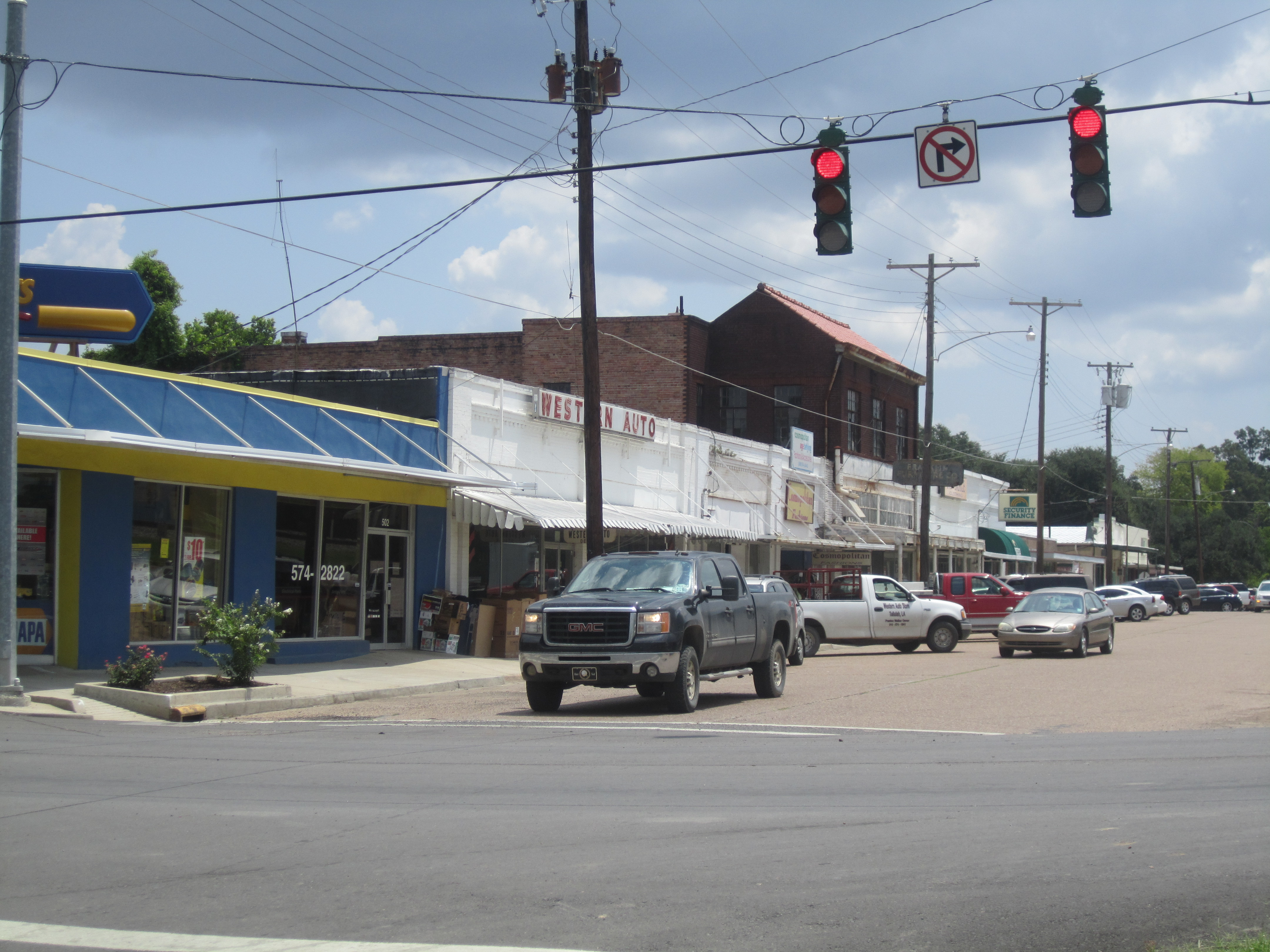
Part of downtown Tallulah

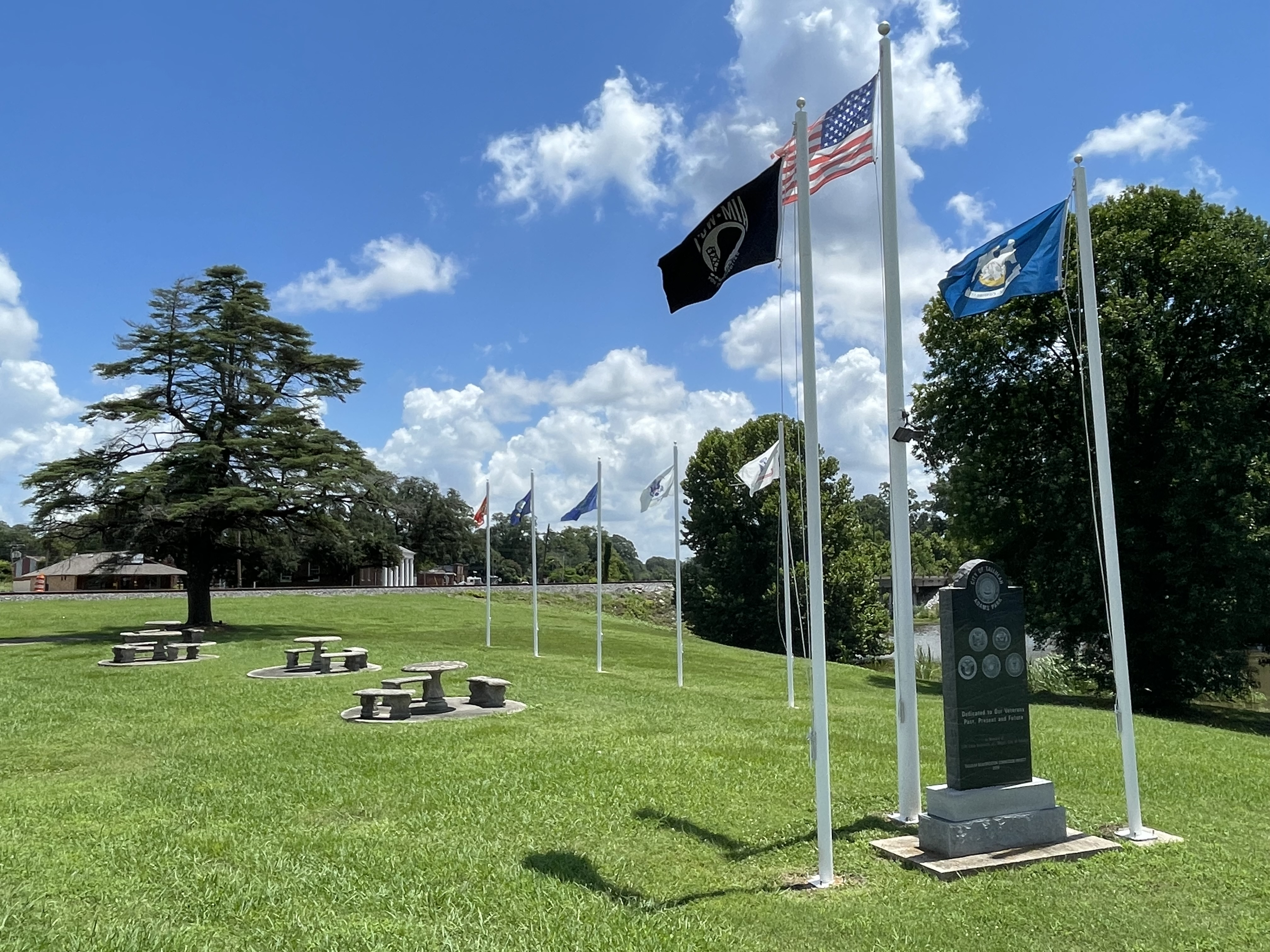
Adams Park in Tallulah

St. Edward's Catholic Church in Tallulah

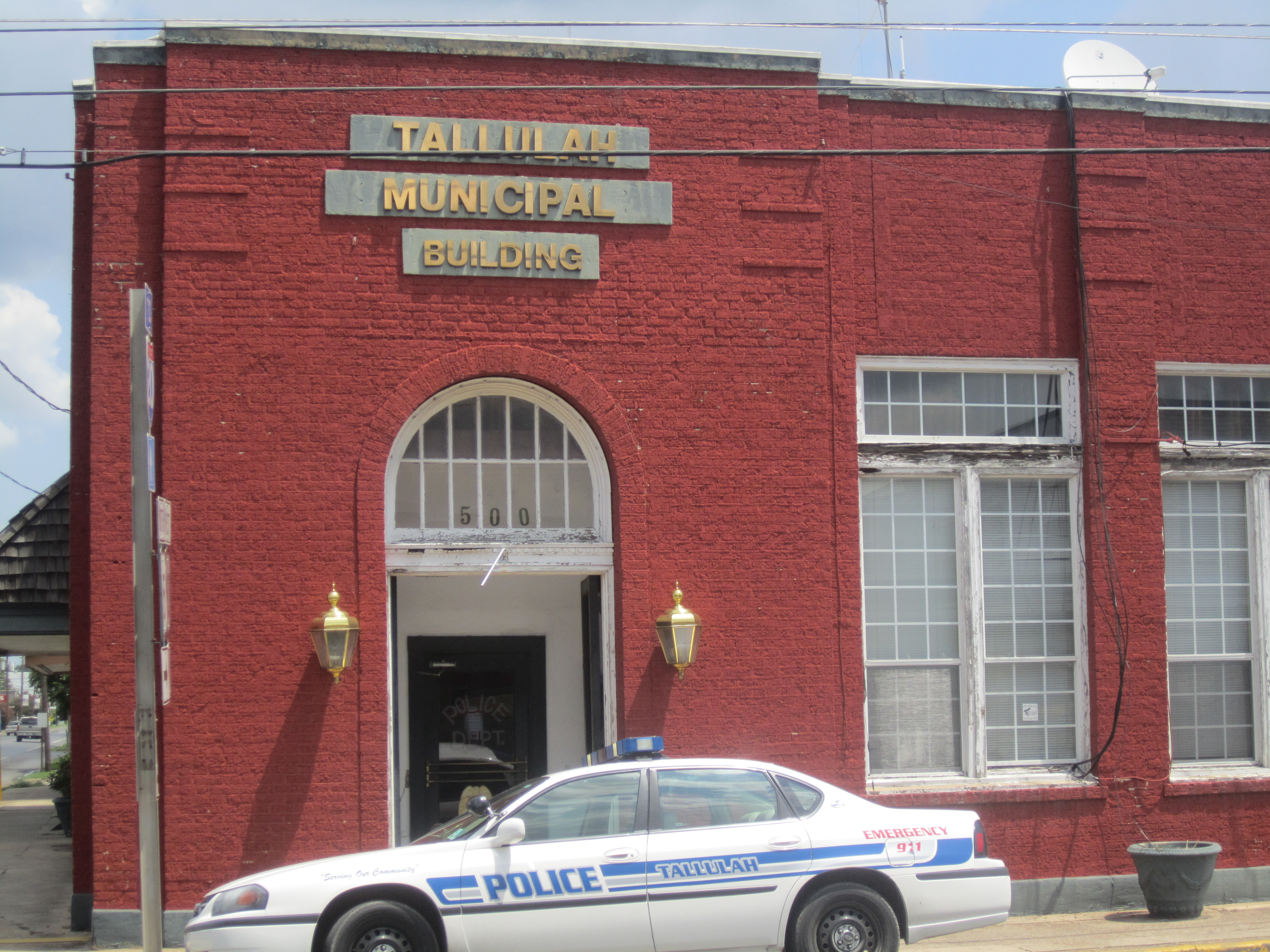
Tallulah municipal building

Tallulah (/təˈluːlə/ tə-LOO-lə) is a city in and the parish seat of Madison Parish in northeastern Louisiana, United States. As of the 2020 census, the population was 6,286, down from 7,335 in 2010.

As this was historically a center of agriculture since the antebellum years, producing cotton and pecans, Tallulah and the parish have long had majority-African American populations. The small city is now nearly 77 percent African American; the surrounding parish is 60 percent black. Mechanization and industrial agriculture have reduced the number of jobs, and many residents have moved since the mid-20th century to larger cities with more opportunities.

Tallulah is the principal city of the Tallulah Micropolitan Statistical Area, which includes all of Madison Parish. The Madison Parish Sheriff's office operates the Steve Hoyle Rehabilitation Center in Tallulah.

== History ==
This area was developed in the antebellum years by European Americans for cotton plantations. They brought in thousands of enslaved African Americans to produce and process the crops. Major planters grew wealthy from their labor at a time when the market for cotton was strong.

=== Post-Civil War to 1942 ===
After the American Civil War, many freedmen from the plantations stayed in the parish, often working as sharecroppers. In the late 19th century, Italian immigrants settled in Louisiana, most in New Orleans but some in outlying parishes such as Madison. Some served as migrant workers on cotton or sugar cane plantations, in the north or south of the state, respectively. The immigrants were primarily from Sicily. Starting as farm workers, some banded together to establish small stores, such as groceries in parish seats and other trading towns.

By 1899, five Sicilians were doing business in Tallulah, with four small stores devoted to fruit, vegetables and poultry. All but one of the men were relatives. Whites attacked the Sicilians because of economic competition. They had also been criticized for failing to comply with Jim Crow rules: if they had black customers waiting, they made new white customers wait their turn rather than giving the whites preference, as was the custom. On July 20, 1899, a mob of white residents of Tallulah lynched the five Sicilians from Cefalù. Two other Italians who lived in nearby Milliken's Bend fled the area for their safety. The Italians were still citizens (nationals) of Italy, and their government protested strongly to the United States government about each lynching murder. The US government said that the states had to prosecute such killings. As was typical in this period of frequent lynchings of black US citizens, none of the white lynch mob was prosecuted.

The city developed through the early 20th century and had a growing population, as people came in from rural areas to work in the lumber mills and timber processing. Because it was the center of a major agricultural area, Tallulah became the site of the Louisiana Delta Fair, held annually in October through the first half of the 20th century. It featured exhibits from Madison, East Carroll, and Tensas parishes. Later in the century, the fair was phased out.

Shirley Field, also known as Scott Field, was reportedly the first airport in Louisiana; it was built in 1922 near Tallulah. Dr. B.R. Coad, head of the Agricultural Experiment Laboratory, developed a process and equipment for crop dusting from airplanes, in order to combat the devastating boll weevil infestation of cotton crops. The USDA bought a Huff-Daland plane for this purpose in 1924. Hundreds of flights took off from the Tallulah Airport as this process was developed, and fields on both sides of the Mississippi were treated. Delta Air Lines had its origins from Delta Dusters, the company developed here to produce and operate crop dusting from airplanes. Shirley Field and the original airport building still stand near Tallulah, and are listed on the National Register of Historic Places (NRHP).

The parish seat also attracted Jewish immigrants. Based on the success of their drugstore, in 1927 merchant brothers Mertie M. and Abe Bloom built the first enclosed shopping mall, Bloom's Arcade, in the United States in Tallulah. It was built by A. Hays Town in the style of European city arcades. The building had a central hall, with stores located on either side, much like the ones today. The hall opened into the street on both ends. This landmark is still in Tallulah, located along what is now U.S. Route 80. It is listed on the National Register of Historic Places (NRHP). As of late 2013, it had been restored to its original architectural character and was adapted as an apartment complex.

Later in 1927, the downtown was flooded during the Great Mississippi Flood of 1927. Many downtown stores were flooded by several feet of water. It took time for the town to recover.

=== World War II to present ===
After serving in World War II, African-American veterans began to challenge racial discrimination in the South more vigorously. After the Supreme Court ruled in Smith v. Allwright (1944) that the white primary of the Democratic Party was unconstitutional, more blacks began to register in the South. However, in Louisiana, the number of white qualified voters in 1947 still surpassed blacks by a ratio of 100 to one.

The population increased in Tallulah in the decades after the war, reaching a high in 1980 (see tables below). African Americans were the majority population in the city and the parish. Having faced continuing discrimination in efforts to vote, in 1962 a group of eight African-American men successfully sued the parish registrar and state to be able to register and vote. Following passage of the national Civil Rights Act in 1964, in 1965, activists conducted boycotts to end discrimination in employment; many stores would not hire blacks as workers. Seventeen businesses closed in the city rather than hire blacks.

That year, Congress passed the Voting Rights Act, authorizing the federal government to oversee voter registration and elections in jurisdictions such as Tallulah and Madison Parish with historic under-representation of minorities. The proportion of African-American voting began to increase.

In 1969, Zelma Wyche, a local veteran and activist, was elected as Police Chief of Tallulah, the first African American to hold the office. He ensured there were an equal number of white and black police officers on the force and had them patrol in mixed teams.

In 1971, black candidates were running for 21 of 27 parish seats in Madison Parish, a sign of the changing times. In other parts of Louisiana, African Americans were also running for local offices.

In 1974, Adell Williams was elected as mayor of Tallulah, the first African American to hold the office. He is believed to have been the first black mayor elected in Louisiana since Reconstruction.

The city had its peak of population in 1980. The mechanization of agriculture and the decline of some former industries have reduced the number of local jobs, with population following. It used to be considered a lumber mill town, with the Chicago Mill and Lumber dominating local industry from its site on the west side of the city. After declines from the 1970s, the mill closed in 1983, adding to local economic problems.

Unlike some other areas of the state, only four antebellum structures remain in the parish, because of destruction by General Ulysses S. Grant's forces during the Vicksburg Campaign in the Civil War. One is a one-story 1855 plantation house, known as Hermione, from the Kell Plantation. It was used by Grant as a Union hospital.

After being donated to the Madison Historical Society in 1997, Hermione was moved to its current site on North Mulberry Street in Tallulah. It was adapted to serve both as offices for the society and as the Hermione Museum, and is listed on the National Register of Historic Places. Among its exhibits is one about Madam C. J. Walker, the first African-American woman to become a self-made businesswoman and millionaire.

Born free soon after the war as Sarah Breedlove in nearby Delta, Louisiana, she moved north as a young woman, where she developed a line of hair-care products that she manufactured and sold nationally. The museum is on the Louisiana African American Heritage Trail.

On April 24, 2010, an EF4 tornado touched down just outside Tallulah, causing numerous injuries. The tornado damaged a tanker in a chemical plant, causing a small nitrogen leak. Significant damage to an industrial plant with associated injuries, trapped people, and destroyed homes nearby were reported in Madison Parish near the Louisiana-Mississippi state line. The tornado continued across the Mississippi River. It gained strength and struck Yazoo, Holmes, and Choctaw counties in Mississippi, causing 10 fatalities and extensive destruction.

=== Seviers of Tallulah ===
Tallulah and Madison Parish have been led and represented politically by numerous members of the prominent Sevier family, who were longtime planters. They are descended from John Sevier, a veteran of the American Revolution, and his wife. Later they were pioneers in what is now Tennessee, and Sevier was elected as the first governor of Tennessee. He was the namesake for the city of Sevierville, Tennessee.

George Washington Sevier Sr. (1858–1925) was elected as a member of the Madison Parish Police Jury. He served as the parish tax assessor from 1891 to 1916. Except for the years 1887–90, there has been at least one member of the Sevier family in public office for the 122 years preceding 2005. The family's power was maintained primarily in the decades-long period when Democratic Party whites dominated voting, and Louisiana was virtually a one-party state. From its passage of a new constitution in 1898, the state legislature worked to disenfranchise African Americans, who were then mostly members of the Republican Party. They were systematically disenfranchised and nearly excluded from the political system until after passage of civil rights legislation in the mid-20th century.

Under these conditions, Andrew Leonard Sevier Sr. was repeatedly re-elected as a Democratic member of the Louisiana State Senate, serving from 1932 until his death in 1962. His widow, the former Irene Newman Jordan, was appointed to serve the rest of his term. Andrew Jackson Sevier Jr. served as sheriff of Madison Parish from 1904 until his death in office in 1941. He was succeeded for the rest of his term by his widow, Mary Louise Day Sevier. A cousin of the Seviers, Henry Clay Sevier, was a member of the Louisiana House of Representatives from 1936 to 1952.

James D. Sevier Sr. and his son, also named James, held the office of tax assessor for more than four decades. Mason Spencer, husband of Rosa Sevier Spencer, represented Madison Parish in the Louisiana House from 1924 to 1936. He planned to run for governor of Louisiana in 1935 but withdrew his candidacy after the assassination of former governor Huey Pierce Long Jr.; Richard Leche of New Orleans, of the Long faction, won the office.

Among the political leaders from this family were William Putnam "Buck" Sevier Jr., a banker. He first served three terms as an elected town alderman in Tallulah. He was elected as mayor of the city in 1946 and served for nearly 30 years, from 1947 to 1974. His tenure included some of the volatile years of the civil rights movement, when African Americans sought changes to the Jim Crow system and justice as citizens. Sevier led white residents in adapting to change as more African-American citizens began to register, vote and be elected to local offices. Sevier at the time of his death held the record, at more than forty-four years, as the longest-serving publicly elected official in Louisiana.

== Detention and correction facilities ==
In November 1994, the state opened the privately operated Tallulah Correctional Center for Youth on the western edge of the city. Residents hoped it would provide jobs for local people and aid the local economy, but there were soon problems associated with management of the facility, and the jobs there were low paying. In addition to problems within the facility, the prison seemed to have an adverse effect on the city. In 1999, the state took over operating the facility, renaming it the Swanson Correctional Center for Youth/Madison Parish Unit, but there continued to be problems with the treatment of youth.

A coalition of townspeople began to work on ideas for different uses for the land. The state decided to close the facility, and the coalition proposed an educational center instead. They gained legislative approval in one year, so when the juvenile prison was closed in 2004, there were plans developed for an educational center on the site. A bill for the Northeast Delta Learning Center was signed by Governor Kathleen Blanco in July 2004. Issues remaining were getting funding for it and offsetting a proposal to use the facility as an adult prison. Despite the desire of the townspeople, the facility was converted to house adult prisoners. It is known as the Madison Parish Louisiana Transitional Center for Women (LCTW), houses 535 inmates, and is operated by LaSalle Corrections, a private company.

Other related facilities in Tallulah, as it is the parish seat, are the Madison Parish Detention Center, with 264 inmates, and the Madison Parish Correctional Center, with 334 inmates. These are also operated by LaSalle Corrections.

== Geography ==
Tallulah is in east-central Madison Parish in northeastern Louisiana. It is in the valley of the Mississippi River, 7 miles (11 km) southwest of the river itself. It is bordered to the south by the village of Richmond.

U.S. Routes 65 and U.S. Route 80 cross in the center of Tallulah. US 65 leads north 28 miles (45 km) to Lake Providence and south 26 miles (42 km) to Newellton, while US 80 leads west 19 miles (31 km) to Delhi and east 22 miles (35 km) to Vicksburg, Mississippi. Interstate 20 crosses the southernmost part of Tallulah, with access from Exit 171 (US 65). I-20 leads east to Vicksburg and west 56 miles (90 km) to Monroe.

According to the United States Census Bureau, Tallulah has a total area of 2.78 square miles (7.2 km^{2}), all of it recorded as land. Brushy Bayou passes through the center of town.

== Climate ==
Climate data for Tallulah, Louisiana (1991–2020 normals, extremes 1907–present)
Month	Jan	Feb	Mar	Apr	May	Jun	Jul	Aug	Sep	Oct	Nov	Dec	Year
Record high °F (°C)	84 (29)	85 (29)	93 (34)	95 (35)	99 (37)	104 (40)	104 (40)	106 (41)	105 (41)	95 (35)	90 (32)	87 (31)	106 (41)
Mean daily maximum °F (°C)	59.6 (15.3)	63.9 (17.7)	71.5 (21.9)	79.1 (26.2)	86.0 (30.0)	91.6 (33.1)	94.2 (34.6)	94.8 (34.9)	90.2 (32.3)	81.3 (27.4)	69.9 (21.1)	61.9 (16.6)	78.7 (25.9)
Daily mean °F (°C)	49.0 (9.4)	52.4 (11.3)	59.9 (15.5)	67.5 (19.7)	75.4 (24.1)	81.6 (27.6)	84.0 (28.9)	84.0 (28.9)	78.9 (26.1)	68.8 (20.4)	57.9 (14.4)	51.1 (10.6)	67.5 (19.7)
Mean daily minimum °F (°C)	38.4 (3.6)	41.0 (5.0)	48.4 (9.1)	56.0 (13.3)	64.8 (18.2)	71.5 (21.9)	73.8 (23.2)	73.3 (22.9)	67.6 (19.8)	56.3 (13.5)	46.0 (7.8)	40.3 (4.6)	56.4 (13.6)
Record low °F (°C)	−8 (−22)	−12 (−24)	11 (−12)	28 (−2)	37 (3)	47 (8)	54 (12)	52 (11)	34 (1)	21 (−6)	15 (−9)	4 (−16)	−12 (−24)
Average precipitation inches (mm)	5.63 (143)	5.54 (141)	5.34 (136)	6.65 (169)	4.49 (114)	3.85 (98)	4.29 (109)	3.86 (98)	3.28 (83)	4.43 (113)	4.68 (119)	5.83 (148)	57.87 (1,470)
Average snowfall inches (cm)	0.1 (0.25)	0.2 (0.51)	0.0 (0.0)	0.0 (0.0)	0.0 (0.0)	0.0 (0.0)	0.0 (0.0)	0.0 (0.0)	0.0 (0.0)	0.0 (0.0)	0.0 (0.0)	0.0 (0.0)	0.3 (0.76)
Average precipitation days (≥ 0.01 in)	8.9	8.3	8.2	6.8	7.6	7.8	7.9	7.4	5.5	5.6	7.0	8.3	89.3
Average snowy days (≥ 0.1 in)	0.1	0.1	0.1	0.0	0.0	0.0	0.0	0.0	0.0	0.0	0.0	0.0	0.3
Source: NOAA

Climate data for Tallulah, Louisiana (Vicksburg – Tallulah Regional Airport) 1991–2020 normals, extremes 1948–present
Month	Jan	Feb	Mar	Apr	May	Jun	Jul	Aug	Sep	Oct	Nov	Dec	Year
Record high °F (°C)	81 (27)	86 (30)	89 (32)	92 (33)	97 (36)	102 (39)	104 (40)	106 (41)	105 (41)	98 (37)	88 (31)	83 (28)	106 (41)
Mean daily maximum °F (°C)	57.2 (14.0)	61.9 (16.6)	69.6 (20.9)	76.9 (24.9)	84.3 (29.1)	90.2 (32.3)	92.6 (33.7)	92.8 (33.8)	88.4 (31.3)	79.1 (26.2)	67.8 (19.9)	59.6 (15.3)	76.7 (24.8)
Daily mean °F (°C)	47.6 (8.7)	51.8 (11.0)	59.1 (15.1)	66.2 (19.0)	73.9 (23.3)	80.4 (26.9)	82.8 (28.2)	82.4 (28.0)	77.2 (25.1)	66.6 (19.2)	55.9 (13.3)	49.7 (9.8)	66.1 (18.9)
Mean daily minimum °F (°C)	37.9 (3.3)	41.7 (5.4)	48.7 (9.3)	55.5 (13.1)	63.5 (17.5)	70.6 (21.4)	73.1 (22.8)	72.0 (22.2)	66.1 (18.9)	54.0 (12.2)	44.0 (6.7)	39.7 (4.3)	55.6 (13.1)
Record low °F (°C)	−2 (−19)	−12 (−24)	11 (−12)	28 (−2)	37 (3)	47 (8)	54 (12)	52 (11)	34 (1)	22 (−6)	15 (−9)	4 (−16)	−12 (−24)
Average precipitation inches (mm)	5.44 (138)	5.11 (130)	5.02 (128)	5.96 (151)	3.85 (98)	3.74 (95)	4.05 (103)	3.75 (95)	3.00 (76)	4.13 (105)	3.92 (100)	5.38 (137)	53.35 (1,355)
Average precipitation days (≥ 0.01 in)	9.3	10.1	9.9	8.4	9.5	9.1	9.7	9.4	6.8	7.5	8.7	10.1	108.5
Source: NOAA

== Demographics ==
Historical population
Census	Pop.	Note	%±
1910	847		—
1920	1,316		55.4%
1930	3,332		153.2%
1940	5,712		71.4%
1950	7,758		35.8%
1960	9,413		21.3%
1970	9,643		2.4%
1980	11,341		17.6%
1990	8,526		−24.8%
2000	9,189		7.8%
2010	7,335		−20.2%
2020	6,286		−14.3%
2025 (est.)	5,517	▼	−12.2%
U.S. Decennial Census

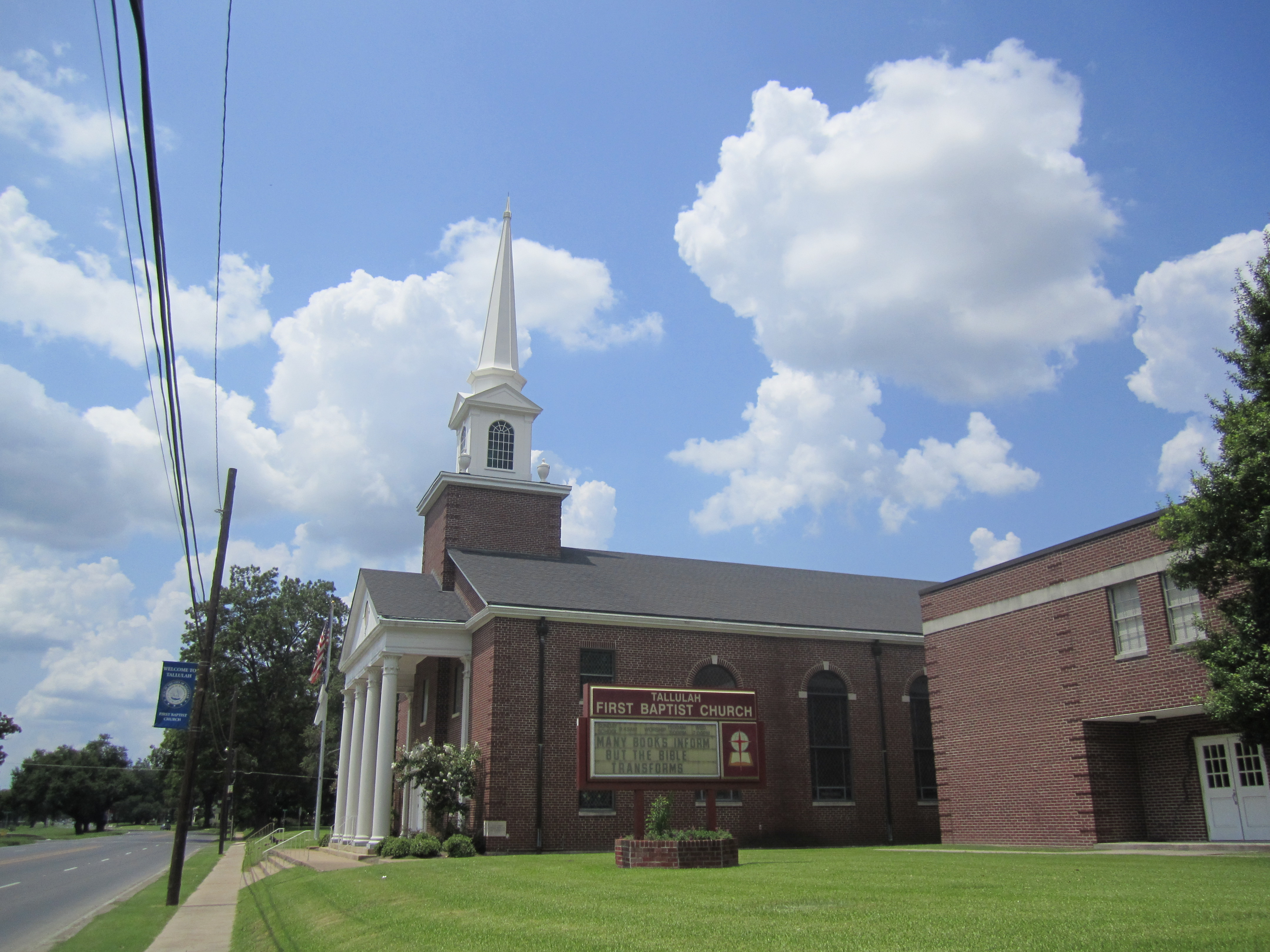
First Baptist Church across from Brushy Bayou in Tallulah, where outdoor baptisms took place in the bayou from the 1920s through the 1940s

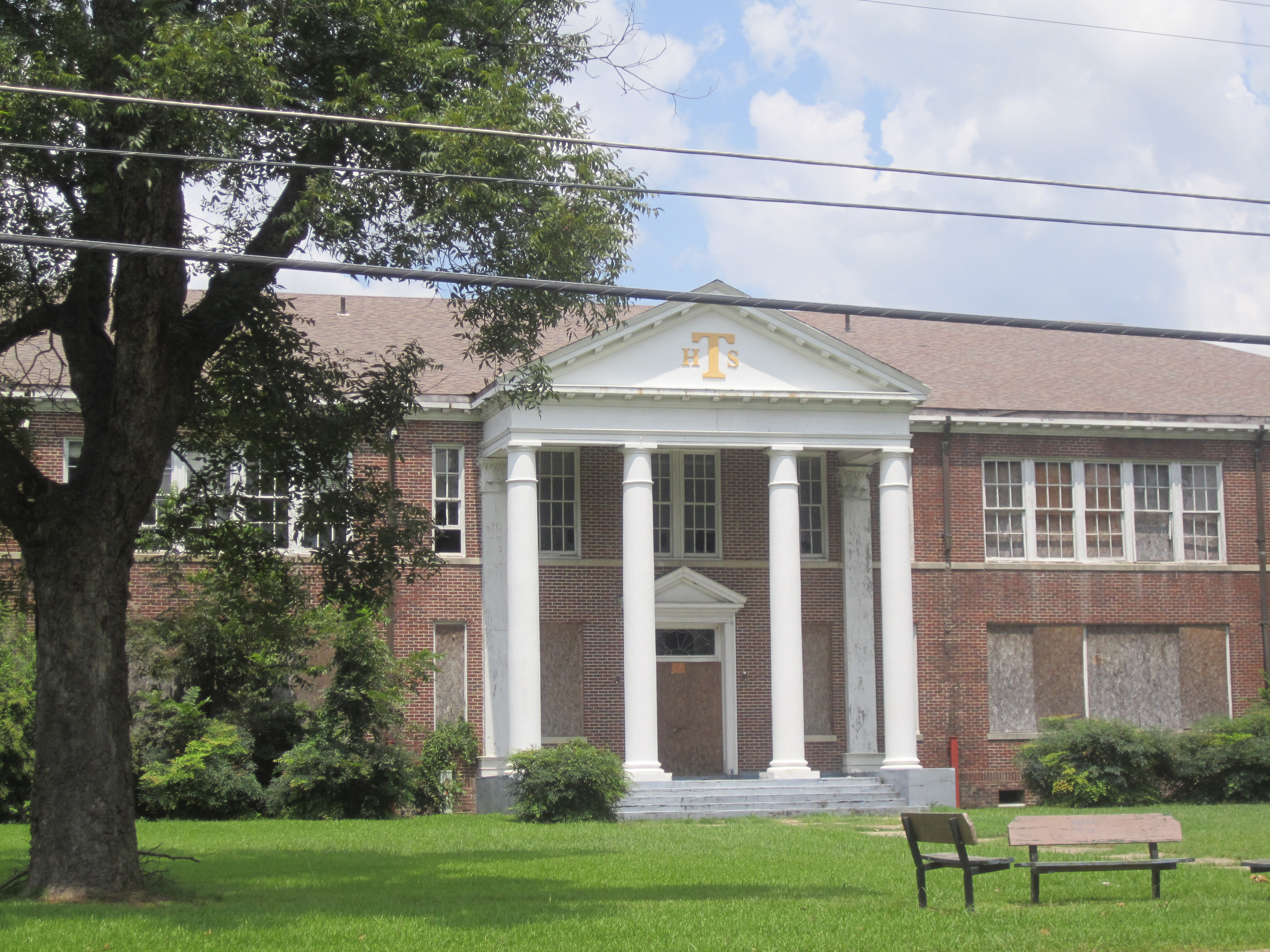
Abandoned Tallulah High School adjacent to First Baptist Church; the school was consolidated with the new Madison High School in Tallulah.

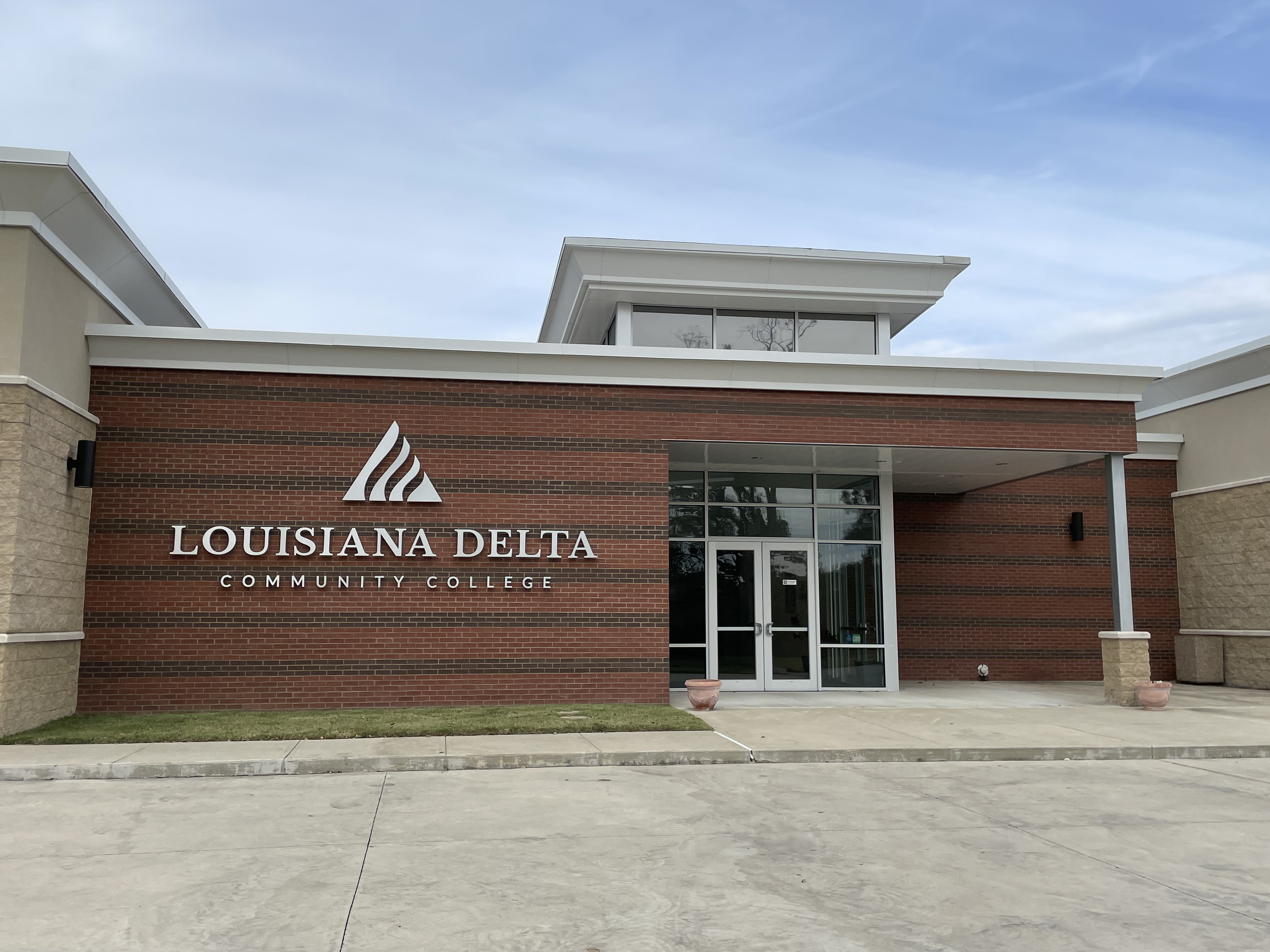
Louisiana Delta Community College Tallulah Campus

=== 2020 census ===
As of the 2020 census, Tallulah had a population of 6,286. The median age was 35.7 years. 27.4% of residents were under the age of 18 and 14.1% of residents were 65 years of age or older. For every 100 females there were 76.9 males, and for every 100 females age 18 and over there were 70.8 males age 18 and over.

100.0% of residents lived in urban areas, while 0.0% lived in rural areas.

There were 2,343 households in Tallulah, of which 34.8% had children under the age of 18 living in them. Of all households, 23.3% were married-couple households, 20.6% were households with a male householder and no spouse or partner present, and 48.9% were households with a female householder and no spouse or partner present. About 33.9% of all households were made up of individuals and 14.2% had someone living alone who was 65 years of age or older.

There were 2,733 housing units, of which 14.3% were vacant. The homeowner vacancy rate was 1.2% and the rental vacancy rate was 5.3%.

Tallulah racial composition as of 2020
Race	Num.	Perc.
White (non-Hispanic)	1,016	16.16%
Black or African American (non-Hispanic)	5,037	80.13%
Native American	12	0.19%
Asian	5	0.08%
Pacific Islander	3	0.05%
Other/Mixed	113	1.8%
Hispanic or Latino	100	1.59%

== Education ==
- Madison Parish School Board operates public schools.
  - Madison High School grades 9-12
  - Madison Middle School (grades 6, 7 and 8)
  - Wright Elementary School (grades 3-5)
- Madison STEAM Academy (grades PK-12)
- Tallulah Academy Delta Christian School (grades PK-12)
- Louisiana Delta Community College operates a Tallulah campus.

== Notable people ==
- Clifford Cleveland Brooks, planter in St. Joseph; represented Madison Parish in the Louisiana State Senate from 1924 to 1932
- Buddy Caldwell, former Attorney General of Louisiana since 2008; former Madison, East Carroll, and Tensas parish district attorney
- James Haynes, NFL player
- Jimmy "Cooch Eye" Jones, former National Basketball Association (NBA) player with the Baltimore Bullets
- Paul Jorgensen, professional boxer
- John Little, professional football player
- Robert Nixon, American serial killer
- Joe Osborn, musician
- James Silas, professional basketball player.
- Jefferson B. Snyder, district attorney of Madison Parish from 1904 to 1948.
- Madam C. J. Walker, born Sarah Breedlove on December 23, 1867, near Delta, Louisiana. She was a businesswoman who became a self-made millionaire from health care products she developed and sold for African Americans.
- Zelma Wyche, political activist, first African-American police chief, and elected mayor of Tallulah, sometimes called "Mr. Civil Rights of Louisiana".
- Adrian Fisher, member of the Louisiana House of Representatives.

== See also ==
- Delta Village
- Hermione Museum

== Representation in other media ==
- Donna Jo Napoli, Alligator Bayou (2009), young adult historical novel about the 1899 lynchings of Italians in Tallulah, published by Wendy Lamb Books.
