= Richmond, Louisiana =

- Village
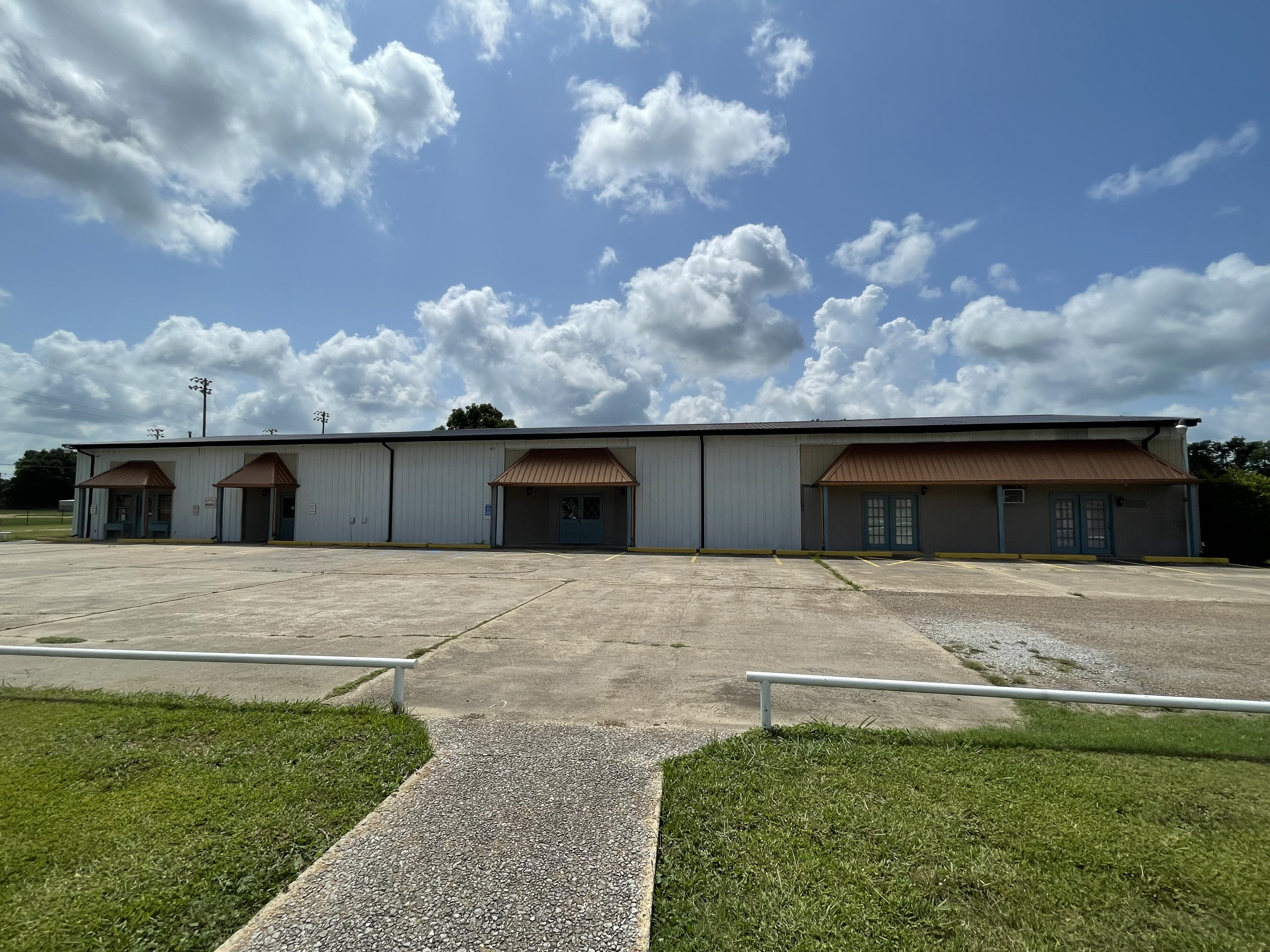
- Richmond Civic Center

- Location in Madison Parish, Louisiana.

- Location of Louisiana in the United States
- Coordinates: 32°23′18″N 91°10′49″W
- Country: United States
- State: Louisiana
- Parish: Madison
- Founded: August 28, 1973

Government
  - Mayor: Preston Walker

Area
  - Total: 1.66 sq mi (4.30 km^{2})
  - Land: 1.66 sq mi (4.30 km^{2})
  - Water: 0 sq mi (0.00 km^{2})
- Elevation: 75 ft (23 m)

Population (2020)
  - Total: 511
  - Density: 307.9/sq mi (118.89/km^{2})
- Time zone: UTC-6 (CST)
  - Summer (DST): UTC-5 (CDT)
- ZIP code: 71282
- Area code: 318
- FIPS code: 22-64590
- GNIS feature ID: 2407536

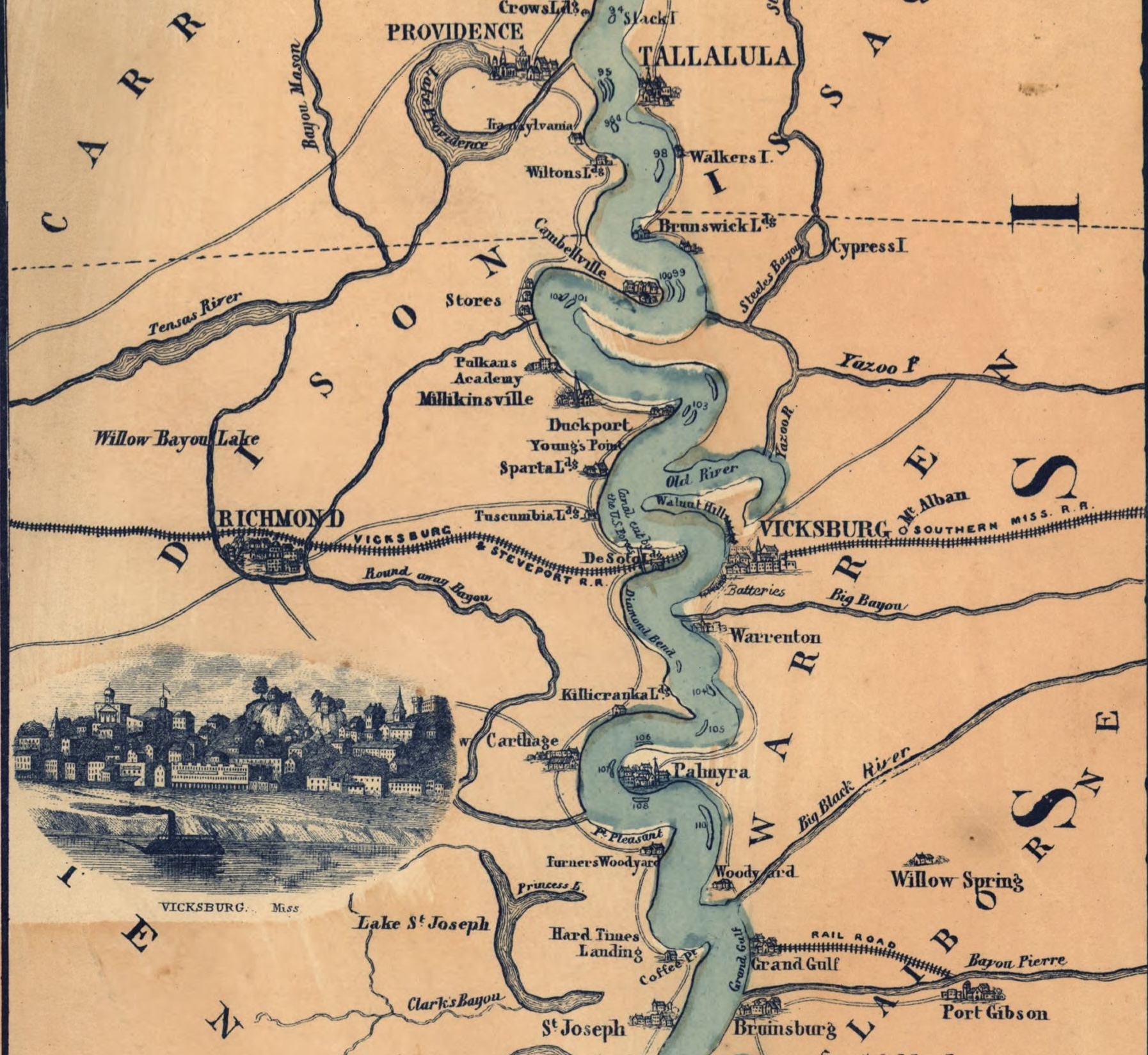
Landmarks in the vicinity of Vicksburg, Mississippi from a river map published in 1863, showing Richmond, which was then the parish seat.

Richmond is a village in Madison Parish, Louisiana, United States, located on Brushy Bayou. The population was 511 at the 2020 census, down from 577 in 2010. It is part of the Tallulah Micropolitan Statistical Area.

The site of Richmond served as the parish seat during the American Civil War and was the location of the Battle of Richmond on June 15, 1863, when Union forces burned the town during the Vicksburg Campaign. The present-day Village of Richmond was incorporated on August 28, 1973, more than a century after the destruction of the earlier settlement.

== History ==
=== Early settlement and Civil War ===
Richmond served as the seat of Madison Parish during the American Civil War. On June 15, 1863, during the Vicksburg Campaign, Union troops fought the Battle of Richmond and, after crossing Brushy Bayou, burned the town. The National Park Service reports Union losses of one killed and 11 wounded, and Confederate losses of five killed and 25 captured.

Earlier that spring, a reconnaissance column skirmished at Richmond on March 31, 1863; historical markers at the site summarize that action and the later burning of the town.

=== Modern village ===
The present-day Village of Richmond was founded on August 28, 1973.

== Geography ==
Richmond is located in east-central Madison Parish. It is bordered to the north by the city of Tallulah, the parish seat. Interstate 20 passes through the south side of the village, with access from Exit 173. I-20 leads west 20 miles (32 km) to Delhi and east the same distance to Vicksburg, Mississippi.

According to the United States Census Bureau, Richmond has a total area of 1.66 square miles (4.3 km^{2}), all of it recorded as land. Brushy Bayou, a branch of Bayou Roundaway, passes through the eastern part of the village and loops around the north and west sides of the village.

== Education ==
Public education is provided by the Madison Parish School District, with campuses located in nearby Tallulah: Tallulah Elementary School (grades PK–2), Wright Elementary School (grades 3–5), Madison Middle School (grades 6–8), Madison High School (grades 9–12), and Christian Acres Alternative School (grades 6–12). Tallulah Academy Delta Christian School is located in Richmond and is a private school.

== Demographics ==
Historical population
Census	Pop.	Note	%±
1980	505		—
1990	447		−11.5%
2000	499		11.6%
2010	577		15.6%
2020	511		−11.4%
2025 (est.)	466	▼	−8.8%
U.S. Decennial Census

As of the census of 2000, there were 499 people, 191 households, and 140 families residing in the village. The population density was 303.3 inhabitants per square mile (117.1/km^{2}). There were 202 housing units at an average density of 122.8 per square mile (47.4/km^{2}). The racial makeup of the village was 92.18% White, 4.81% African American, 0.40% Asian, 1.60% from other races, and 1.00% from two or more races. Hispanic or Latino of any race were 4.41% of the population.

There were 191 households, out of which 31.9% had children under the age of 18 living with them, 61.3% were married couples living together, 8.4% had a female householder with no husband present, and 26.7% were non-families. 22.5% of all households were made up of individuals, and 6.3% had someone living alone who was 65 years of age or older. The average household size was 2.57 and the average family size was 2.99.

In the village, the population was spread out, with 24.0% under the age of 18, 11.0% from 18 to 24, 28.5% from 25 to 44, 27.9% from 45 to 64, and 8.6% who were 65 years of age or older. The median age was 37 years. For every 100 females, there were 87.6 males. For every 100 females age 18 and over, there were 87.6 males.

The median income for a household in the village was $39,485, and the median income for a family was $42,500. Males had a median income of $33,750 versus $24,821 for females. The per capita income for the village was $19,650. About 3.3% of families and 6.2% of the population were below the poverty line, including 3.2% of those under age 18 and 5.5% of those age 65 or over.

== Transportation ==
Richmond lies in the Mississippi Delta region of northeastern Louisiana. Interstate 20 crosses the south side of Richmond, and U.S. Route 65 and U.S. Route 80 run just north through Tallulah; state routes LA 602-1 and LA 602-2 serve the immediate area. The nearest public-use airport is Vicksburg–Tallulah Regional Airport (KTVR) in Tallulah.

== Climate ==
According to 1991–2020 climate normals from the NOAA station at Tallulah (USC00168923), the area averages an annual mean temperature of 67.5 °F (19.7 °C) and annual precipitation of 57.87 inches (1,469.9 mm). July and August average daily highs of about 94 °F (34.4 °C), while January’s daily mean is about 49.0 °F (9.4 °C).
