= Delta Village =

Historical amusement park in Tallulah, Louisiana, United States

Delta Village was an amusement park in Tallulah, Louisiana, United States. It operated from the early 1970s to the late 1970s. No traces of the park remain today.

Delta Village was a small park with a half dozen rides, designed to appeal to small children. It included a petting zoo, replicas of Wild West buildings, and a "Storybook Land," with replicas of objects from nursery rhymes. This was also designed to appeal to very young children.

The amusement park is remembered for its Wild West Medicine Show. It featured "Chief Running Wind" (Ray Stevens) and his Indian riders, who performed various types of stunt riding. Cowboys performed stunt fistfights and jump off rooftops. The show also usually featured a medicine man trying to sell cough syrup as a miracle drug. The park closed shortly after a child was killed from falling out of one of the rides, and it never reopened.

Delta Village housed one of the first coin-operated games in which visitors could pit their quick-draw skills against the fastest cowboy gunman robot in the west. There were also midway games, in which participants tried to win a live goldfish by throwing a ping-pong ball into a small glass container. There was a magic show with audience member participation. Children could watch a chicken play the piano for a nickel, or walk through the Gravity House where objects appeared to roll uphill.

Amusement park rides included a log flume, a train ride featuring a cave with a gorilla, and a boat ride that featured simulated explosions in the river. There was also a giant slide, similar to those seen at state fairs. Visitors would climb up stairs and ride down the slide on a bean sack.
