= Zelma Wyche =

American politician

Zelma Charles Wyche
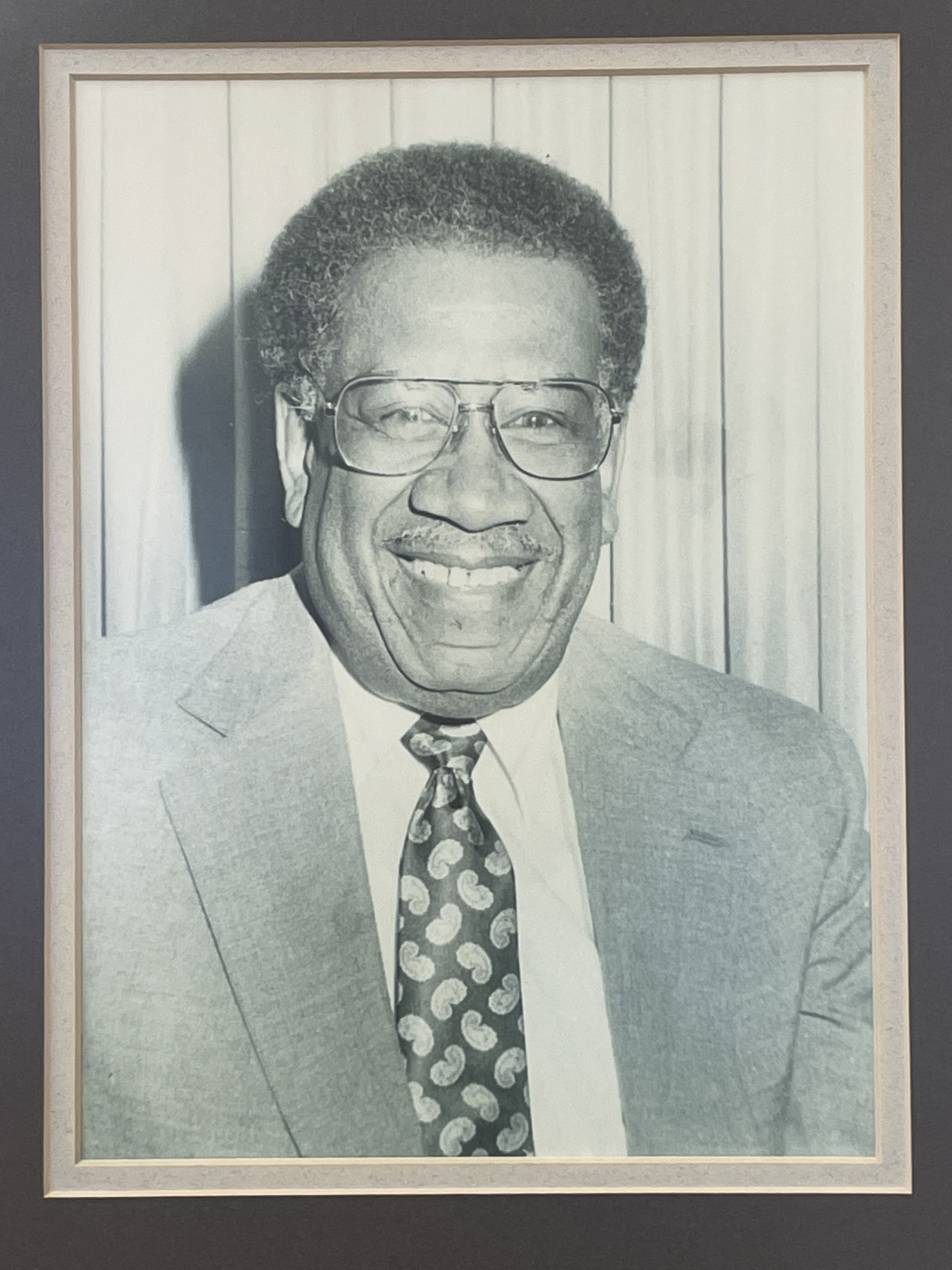

Police Chief of Tallulah, Louisiana
- In office June 24, 1969 – June 30, 1978
- Preceded by: Clayton W. Cox
- Succeeded by: Howard Claxton Sr.

Mayor of Tallulah, Louisiana
- In office July 1, 1986 – July 1, 1990
- Preceded by: Leander A. "Doc" Anthony
- Succeeded by: Donald E. Walker

Personal details
- Born: January 24, 1918 Tallulah, Louisiana, U.S.
- Died: September 24, 1999 (aged 81)
- Resting place: Oakwood Cemetery in Tallulah, Louisiana
- Party: Democratic
- Spouse: Myrtle Washington Wyche
- Children: 2
- Occupation: Barber; Government official

Zelma Charles Wyche (January 24, 1918 – September 24, 1999) was an African-American veteran of World War II, civil rights activist, and later an elected politician in Tallulah, the parish seat of Madison Parish in northeastern Louisiana.

In 1962 Wyche and other plaintiffs won a civil suit against the local registrar and state government, and were able to register to vote. He encouraged other Black residents in town to register. Beginning in 1969, and following passage of the Voting Rights Act of 1965, Wyche was elected to the local office of police chief of the city; he was reelected and served eleven years. In 1986 he was elected as mayor of Tallulah, serving one term until 1990.

After decades as a grassroots organizer, Wyche began to receive national attention for his work to dismantle racial segregation. In January 1970, six months after he was elected as Tallulah police chief, Ebony Magazine featured him in the article, "Black Lawman in KKK Territory." This was a reference to the Tallulah branch of the Ku Klux Klan, whose numerous local chapters fought desegregation in the American South. Until Wyche became police chief, he had earned his living as a barber.

== Early life and education ==
Wyche was born in 1918 and raised in Tallulah, Louisiana, where he attended segregated schools. Both the city and parish were majority black, the center of an agricultural area, but African Americans were largely disfranchised for decades into the mid-20th century, as they were throughout most of the Jim Crow South. Wyche studied and became a barber, which could offer a decent living. When he was in his 20s, he enlisted in the US Army and served during World War II.

Even before he served in the war, Wyche began to work for African-American civil rights. Since 1942, Wyche had chaired the group "Equal Rights for Black People". (This organization may have originally used the word "Colored" or "Negro" originally because the term "black" was not widely used until after 1970.)

== Political activism and career ==
After returning as a veteran of World War II, Wyche and other African-American men did not want to accept Jim Crow conditions in Louisiana and increased their activism for civil rights. In 1947 he joined seven other black men in filing a lawsuit against the Madison Parish registrar of voters and Governor Jimmie Davis to enforce the right of blacks to vote, as guaranteed by the Fifteenth Amendment to the United States Constitution. The state had raised barriers to voter registration in its constitution of 1898, through such devices as poll taxes and subjective literacy tests administered by white registrars. Decades into the 20th century, most African Americans in Louisiana were excluded from the political system

Wyche and the plaintiffs prevailed in the lawsuit in 1962, and the court ordered that they be allowed to register. He became one of the first African Americans since Reconstruction in Tallulah to register to vote and subsequently run for office in the city. He also worked to get other African Americans registered. In his barbershop, Wyche often spoke of his interest in law enforcement and such television series as Highway Patrol, starring Broderick Crawford, Dragnet with Jack Webb, and Perry Mason, starring Raymond Burr.

In 1965, following passage of the Civil Rights Act of 1964, Wyche led demonstrations in the city to promote school integration, job opportunities for blacks, and support of government anti-poverty programs. He was arrested six times. In 1966, he received a four-month sentence for assaulting a white man, Dr. John Monsell, at Bill's Highway 80 Truck Stop. Appeal of the Monsell case was still in litigation after Wyche became police chief. Wyche served thirty-four days of the four-month sentence, during which he picked 250 pounds of cotton in a parish penal unit.

In 1966, Wyche ran for a seat as alderman, but failed by 111 votes. Two years later, on February 6, 1968, Wyche ran as the Democratic nominee for Police Chief, formerly the village marshal. He lost by 196 votes to white Republican Clayton W. Cox.

Wyche had urged his supporters to vote straight Democrat, but the police chief contest was a special election. That office was severed from the rest of the Democratic nominees on the ballot. Most of the Democrats ran unopposed. The only statewide contest was for state treasurer between Democrat Mary Evelyn Parker and Republican Allison Kolb.

When voters marked the straight Democratic ticket with a single lever of the voting machine, several hundred Wyche supporters thought they had cast a vote for Wyche. When he and his supporters found out about the peculiarity of the ballot and the "missing" votes, Wyche successfully sued for another election. A federal judge ruled that the way the ballots had been set up for the special election was discriminatory.

Wyche won the next special election for Police Chief and took office on June 26, 1969. The police force already had four black and six white officers; after two of the latter left, he replaced them, and hired two more black officers. He would send them out in teams. In his first months in office, Wyche held what he called "sensitivity sessions", inviting the public to meet his officers and trying to improve relations with the community. He noted that blacks had often been harassed by police.

Wyche also reached out to white businesses to assure them he would offer crime protection. Seventeen businesses had closed in 1965 rather than hire blacks, when African Americans conducted a boycott against them. That year Wyche was among numerous civil rights leaders in the South interviewed by Stanford University for an oral history project.

Because of historic under-representation of black voters in Tallulah and Madison Parish in most of the 20th century, the white minority in the city, 32 percent in 1970 (and in the parish) was considered the "majority" for purposes of enforcement of civil rights legislation. That is, until the parish established a record of representative voter registration, the federal government had oversight of its processes.

At first Wyche was unable to obtain much support from whites. In time whites slowly made peace with the emerging majority of black voters, following the lead of veteran mayor William Putnam Sevier, who served from 1946 to 1974. He was a descendant of the early Tennessee pioneer John Sevier, and a member of a strong political family in Tallulah and Madison Parish, whose members also served at state and national levels.

Time in 1970 described Sheriff Wyche by the following:

... the massive, 6-ft. 2-in. figure swaggers down the sidewalk. There is the natty uniform with gold stars on a white starched shirt, a button open at the neck. And there is the amiable cockiness, the touch of braggadocio, the blunt cigar and the smile revealing two gold-crowned teeth. Only one anomaly destroys the stereotype: Chief Wyche is black.

Wyche was reelected twice in regular elections, and served in total for more than two terms as chief, until June 30, 1978. He was succeeded by Howard Claxton Sr.

Wyche served as chairman of the political action commission of the Louisiana's 5th congressional district Black Caucus. This district was long represented by Otto Passman (D) (1947-1977), a white conservative who was first elected in the years of disenfranchisement of blacks and was a critic of civil rights legislation. Passman was defeated in the 1976 Democratic primary by Jerry Huckaby. (The 5th district was redrawn in 2013 following reapportionment after the 2010 census.)

In 1972, Wyche was elected as a chairman of the Louisiana delegation to the Democratic National Convention, which met in Miami Beach, Florida, and nominated the McGovern-Shriver ticket. Newly elected Governor Edwin Edwards (D) attended the convention. After he refused to back party nominee George McGovern, Edwards was snubbed by the Louisiana delegation. Leon Irwin, III (1936-2006), a former Democratic National Committeeman from New Orleans, attributed the snub to Wyche, and said that he was one who "knows a great deal about politics but has very bad manners." Edwards was unhappy with the McGovern nomination; he predicted that incumbent President Richard M. Nixon [a Republican] would win the electoral vote of Louisiana. In keeping with the increasing shift of white Democrats to Republican candidates, Nixon carried much of the South in 1972.

In 1978, Wyche was a dinner guest of U.S. President Jimmy Carter at Blair House in Washington, D.C.

In 1986, Wyche was elected mayor; he defeated the Republican candidate, William Ellis Buckner (born c. 1929), 1,891 votes (55.4 percent) to 1,525 (44.6 percent). Two other African-American candidates were eliminated in the nonpartisan blanket primary: incumbent Democratic Mayor Leander A. "Doc" Anthony, who finished in a strong third-place showing; and Adell Williams, Tallulah's first African-American mayor, elected in 1974.

In the 1986 election Republican candidates won two of the five city council seats. One, Charles Michael Finlayson (born c. 1956), has been repeatedly re-elected to the District 1 seat, later becoming mayor himself and succeeded by the first black female elected, Yvonne Lewis.

Wyche was defeated for a second term as mayor in the primary election held on April 7, 1990, by Donald E. Walker, who finished with 54.4 percent of the ballots cast. Other candidates were former mayor Adell Williams, and Republican Donna Cummins, who polled 3.9 percent of the vote.

== Personal life and death ==
Wyche was the chairman of the board of the Madison Parish Hospital and president of Delta Community Action Agency. He organized Tallulah's first troop of the Boy Scouts of America. He was an associate in the construction of three apartment complexes, one of which bears his name. Wyche was a member of the Masonic lodge, the Benevolent and Protective Order of Elks, and the deacon board of the Greater Mt. Olive Baptist Church at 316 North Walnut Street in Tallulah.

Wyche and his wife, the former Myrtle Washington, had two children, Elois Wyche Saucer, of Decatur, Georgia, a retired funeral director, and Dr. Ronald Charles Wyche, currently living in Tallulah. Zelma C. Wyche died on September 24, 1999, and was known as "Mr. Civil Rights of Louisiana." He is interred at Oakwood Cemetery in Tallulah.

Fish Street in Tallulah was renamed for the civil rights icon.

Preceded by Clayton W. Cox	Police Chief of Tallulah, Louisiana; 1969–1978	Succeeded by Howard Claxton Sr.
Preceded by Leander A. "Doc" Anthony	Mayor of Tallulah, Louisiana; 1986–1990	Succeeded by Donald E. Walker
