= Old Vicksburg Bridge =

- The bridge in 2025, with the new Vicksburg Bridge in the background
- Coordinates: 32°18′53″N 90°54′21″W
- Carries: 1 CPKC rail line, one service lane
- Crosses: Mississippi River
- Locale: Delta, Louisiana and Vicksburg, Mississippi
- Maintained by: Canadian Pacific Kansas City

Characteristics
- Design: Cantilever bridge
- Total length: 8,546 feet (2,605 m)
- Longest span: 825 feet (251 m)
- Clearance below: 116 feet (35 m)

History
- Opened: May 1, 1930

Statistics
- Daily traffic: 17.3 trains per day (as of 2014)
- Mississippi River Bridge
- U.S. National Register of Historic Places
- Location within Louisiana Location within the United States Location within Mississippi Location within the United States
- Location: Spans Mississippi River on Old US 80, Vicksburg, Mississippi and Delta, Louisiana
- Coordinates: 32°18′53″N 90°54′21″W
- Built: 1928
- Architects: Vicksburg Bridge and Terminal Co.
- Architectural style: Cantilevered truss span
- MPS: Historic Bridges of Mississippi TR
- NRHP reference No.: 88002423
- Added to NRHP: February 14, 1989

Location
- Interactive map of Old Vicksburg Bridge

The Old Vicksburg Bridge, also known as Mississippi River Bridge, is a cantilever bridge carrying one rail line across the Mississippi River between Delta, Louisiana and Vicksburg, Mississippi.

== History ==
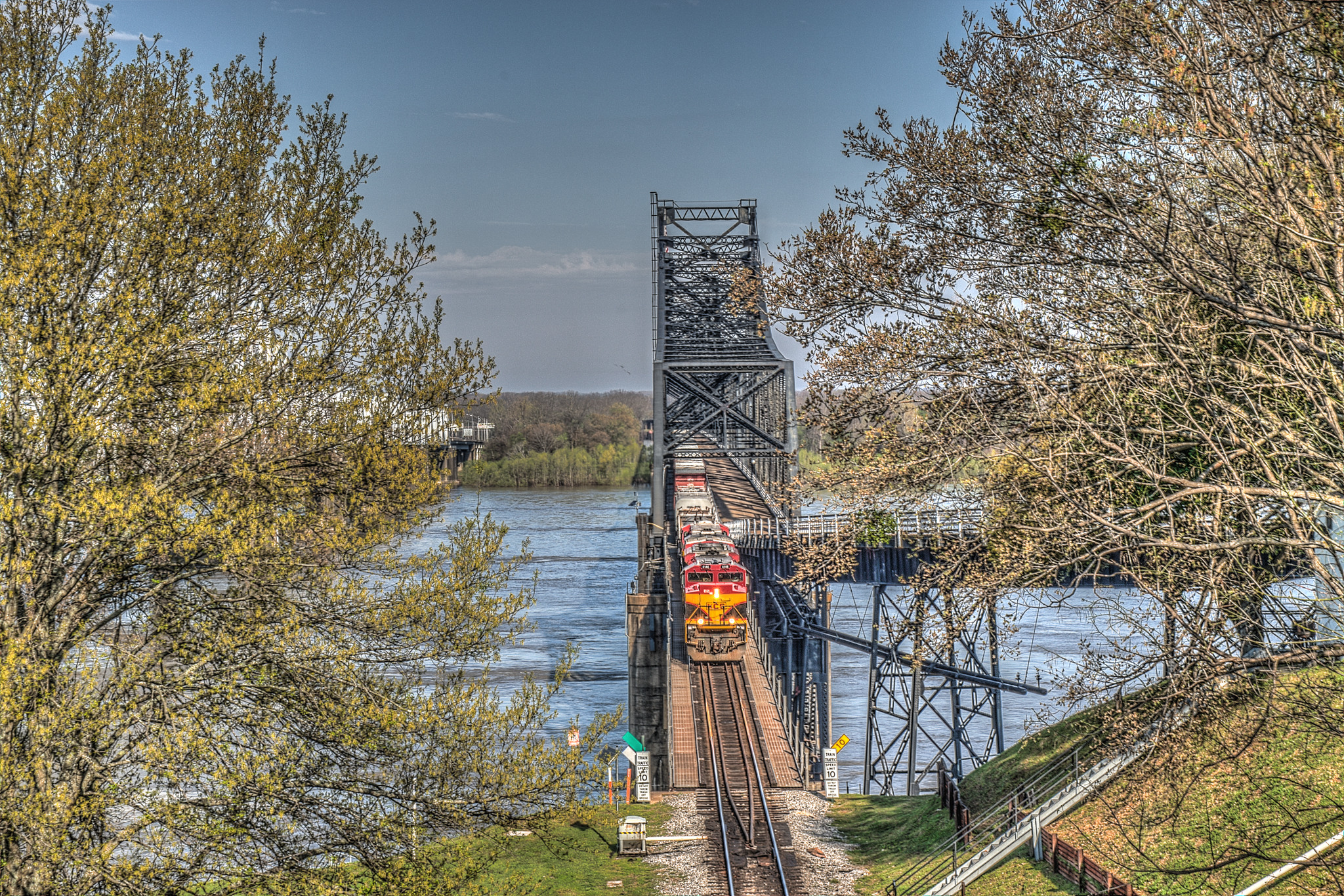
A Kansas City Southern train on the bridge in 2016

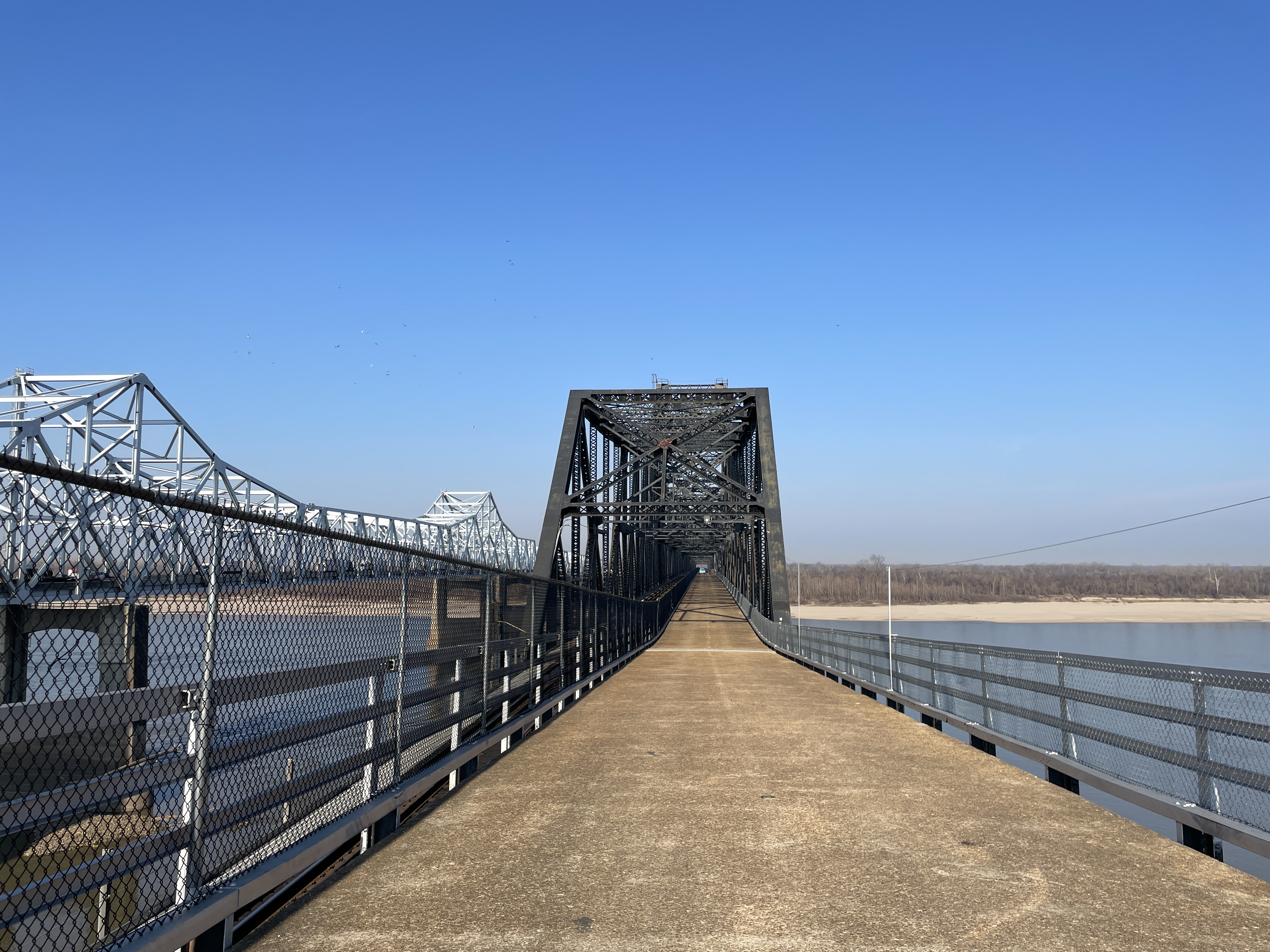
The former road deck of the bridge, now a pedestrian path

It was listed on the National Register of Historic Places in 1989.

It was built by the Vicksburg Bridge & Terminal Co. during 1928-1930 and has three cantilevered truss spans and three Parker truss spans.

Until 1998, the bridge was open to motor vehicles and carried U.S. Route 80 (US 80) across the Mississippi River. It is now only a railroad bridge, though one road lane runs through the bridge for inspection by workers. It was replaced by the new Vicksburg Bridge, a short distance down river, for vehicle crossings. During this period, a rather unusual system was used to accommodate tractor-trailer traffic on the bridge. Located at each end of the bridge were railroad-style signal towers that required trucks to stop on command. Prior to installation of the towers trucks were allowed to traverse the bridge alongside other passenger and train traffic. Once put in place the towers effectively closed off traffic for all vehicles in both directions to allow trucks to cross the bridge alone, using the full width of both of the narrow lanes. Due to numerous safety concerns, crossings by trucks were limited to daytime, with trucks being required to wait until dawn before being allowed on the bridge.

== See also ==
- List of crossings of the Lower Mississippi River
- National Register of Historic Places listings in Madison Parish, Louisiana
- National Register of Historic Places listings in Warren County, Mississippi
