= Vicksburg Bridge =

- The bridge in 2014
- Coordinates: 32°18′55″N 90°54′30″W
- Carries: 4 lanes of I-20 / US 80
- Crosses: Mississippi River
- Locale: Delta, Louisiana and Vicksburg, Mississippi

Characteristics
- Design: Cantilever bridge
- Total length: 12,974 feet (3,954 m)
- Width: 60 feet (18 m)
- Longest span: 870 feet (265 m)
- Clearance below: 116 feet (35 m)

History
- Opened: February 14, 1973

Statistics
- Daily traffic: 25,000 (2007)

Location
- Interactive map of Vicksburg Bridge

The Vicksburg Bridge is a cantilever bridge carrying Interstate 20 and U.S. Route 80 across the Mississippi River between Delta, Louisiana and Vicksburg, Mississippi. The Vicksburg Bridge is the northernmost crossing of the Mississippi River in Louisiana open to motor vehicles.

== History ==
In 1998, when the Old Vicksburg Bridge was closed to motor vehicles, U.S. Route 80 (US 80) was routed over the bridge.

In 2013 state officials announced projects to improve the stability of the bridge, and to install underwater radar to assist barge captains in avoiding the bridge, which had been struck by barges repeatedly since its construction.

== See also ==
- List of crossings of the Lower Mississippi River
