= Madison Parish, Louisiana =

Parish in Louisiana, United States

Madison Parish
- Parish
- Parish of Madison; Paroisse de Madison (French)
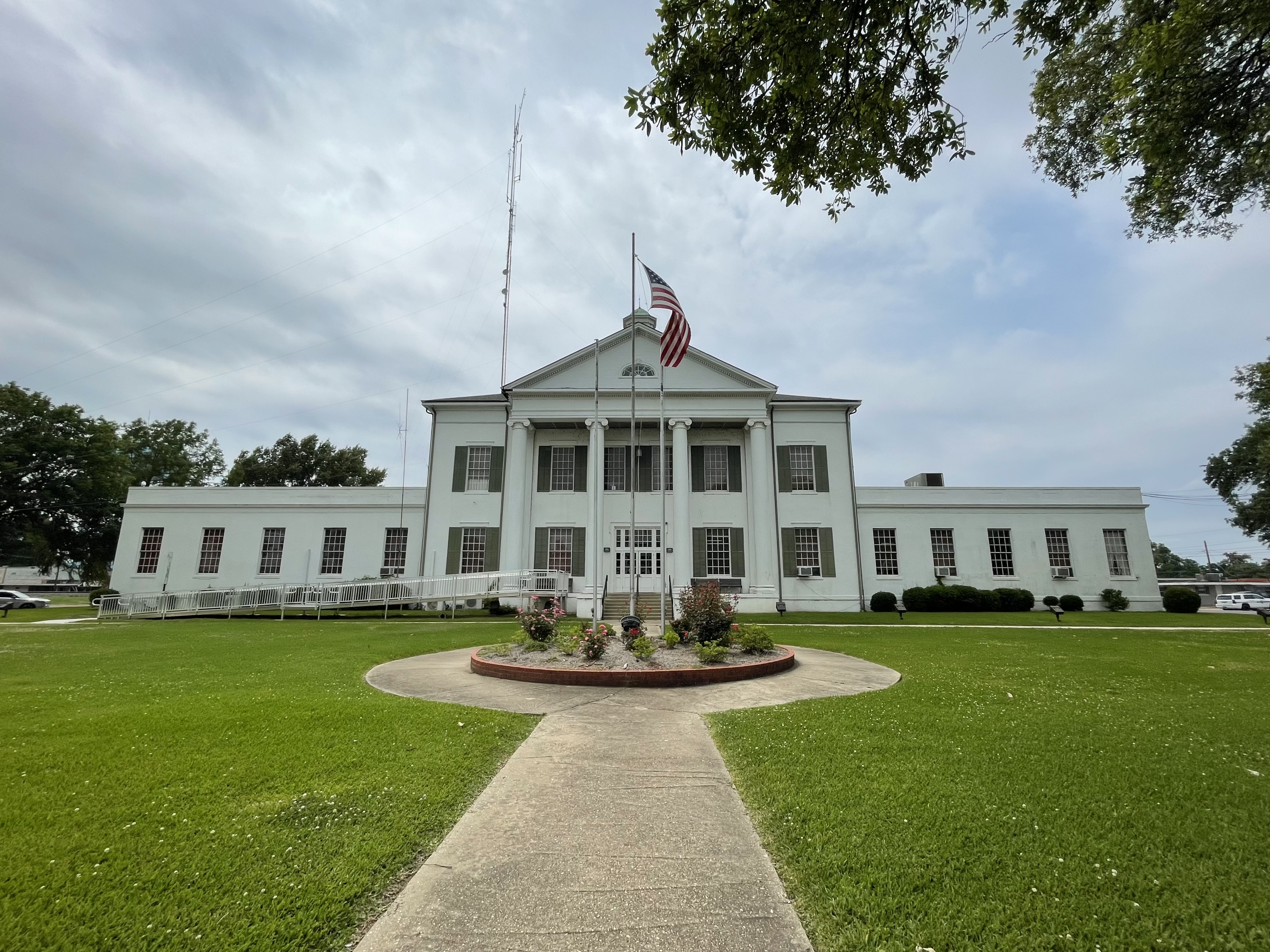
- Madison Parish Courthouse in Tallulah

- Location within the U.S. state of Louisiana
- Coordinates: 32°22′N 91°14′W
- Country: United States
- State: Louisiana
- Founded: January 19, 1838
- Named for: James Madison
- Parish seat (and largest city): Tallulah

Government
  - Parish President: Jane Sanders

Area
  - Total: 651 sq mi (1,690 km^{2})
  - Land: 624 sq mi (1,620 km^{2})
  - Water: 26 sq mi (67 km^{2}) 4.1%

Population (2020)
  - Total: 10,017
  - Estimate (2025): 8,844 ▼
  - Density: 15/sq mi (5.8/km^{2})
- Time zone: UTC−6 (Central)
  - Summer (DST): UTC−5 (CDT)
- Congressional district: 5th
- Website: madisonparish.org

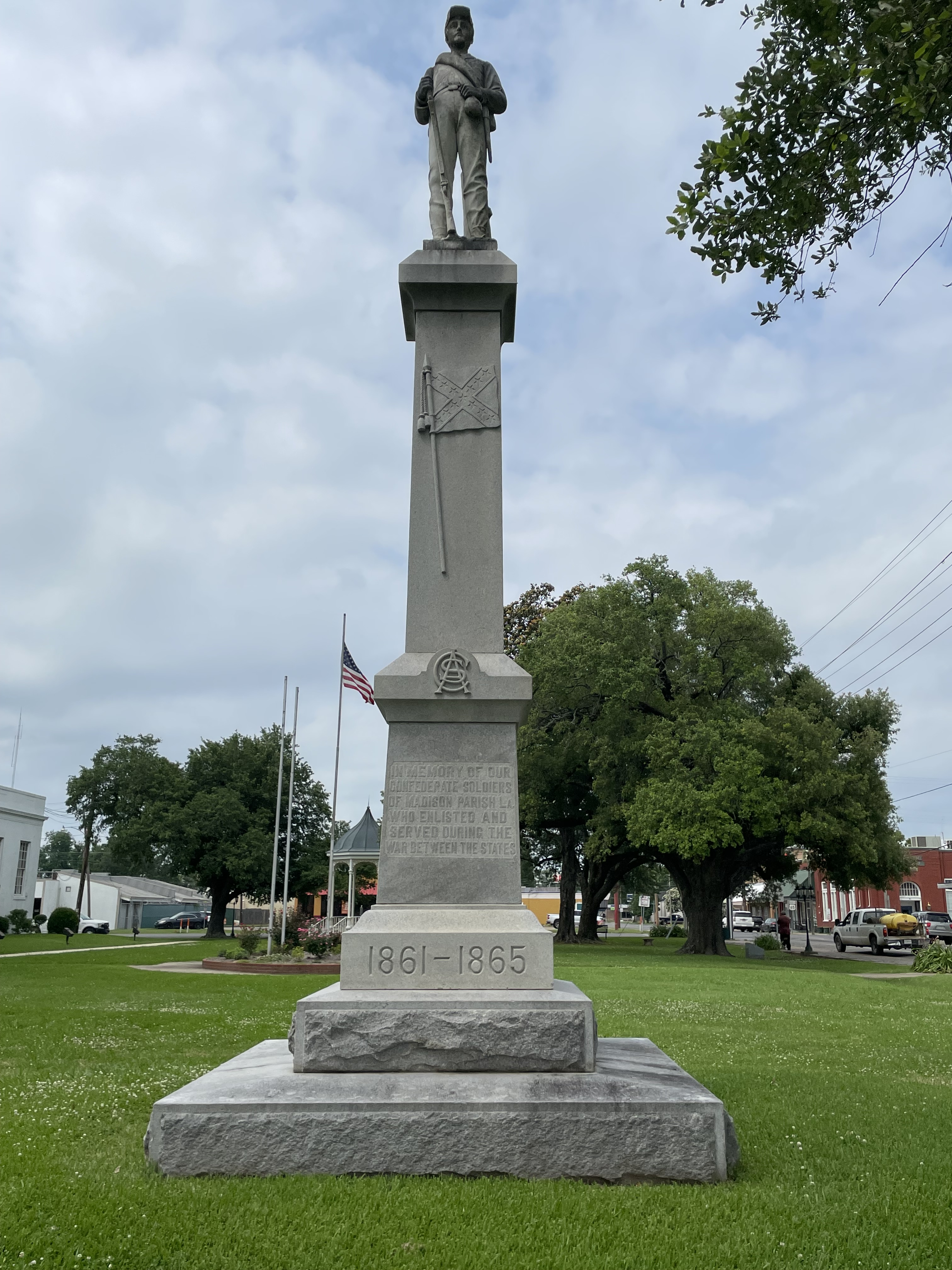
Confederate monument in Tallulah at the Madison Parish Courthouse.

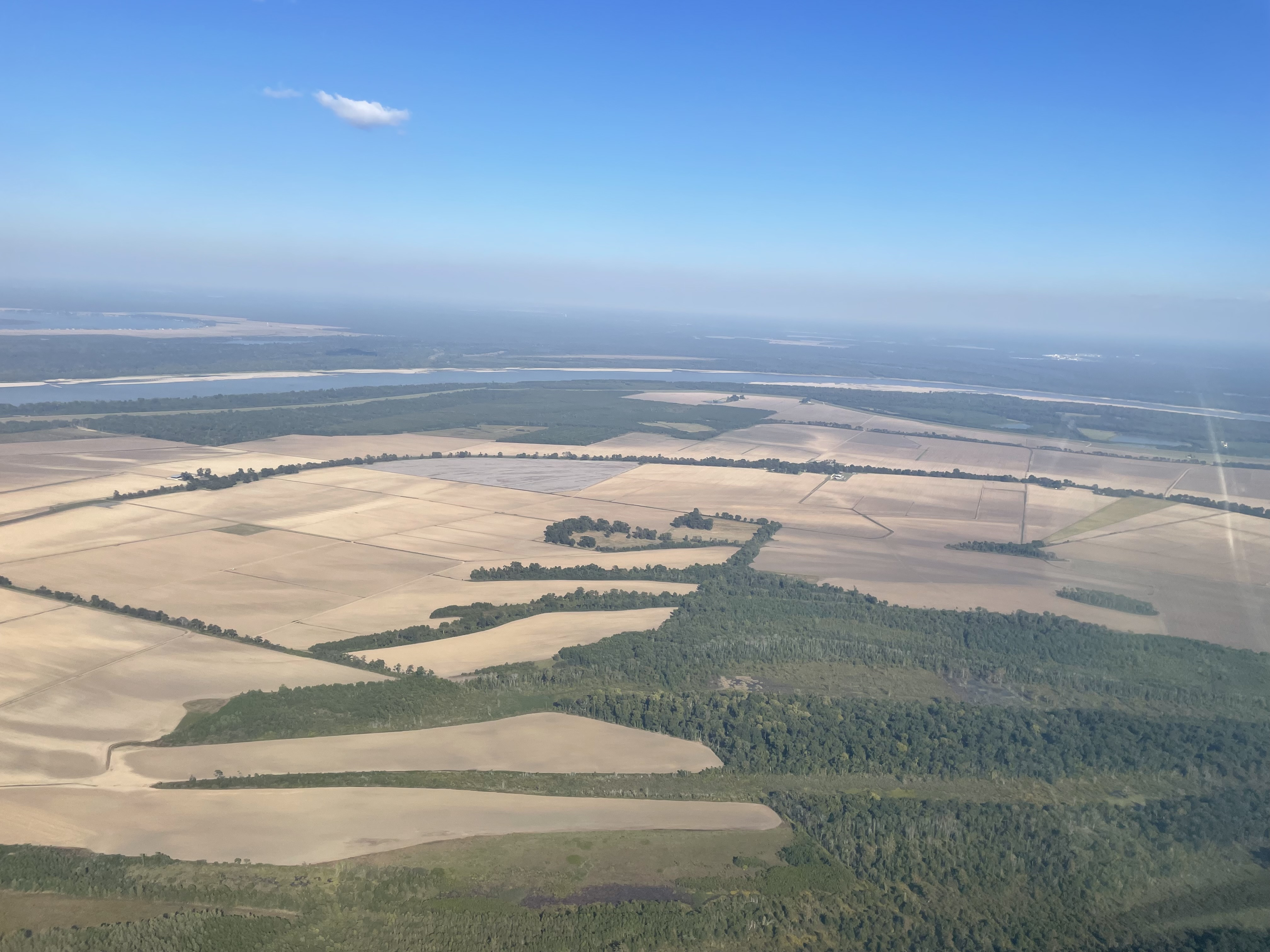
Aerial view of Madison Parish, Louisiana.

Madison Parish (French: Paroisse de Madison) is a parish located on the northeastern border of the U.S. state of Louisiana, in the delta lowlands along the Mississippi River. As of the 2020 census, the population was 10,017. Its parish seat is Tallulah. It was created by the Louisiana legislature on January 19, 1838, from part of Concordia Parish and was organized by 1839. With a history of cotton plantations and pecan farms, the parish economy continues to be primarily agricultural. It has a majority African-American population. For years a ferry connected Delta, Louisiana (and traffic from the parish) to Vicksburg, Mississippi. The Vicksburg Bridge now carries U.S. Route 80 and Interstate 20 across the river into Madison Parish.

== History ==
=== Prehistory ===
Madison Parish was the home to many succeeding Native American groups in the thousands of years before European settlement. Peoples of the Marksville culture, Troyville culture, Coles Creek culture and Plaquemine culture built villages and earthwork mound complexes throughout the area. Notable mound centers in the parish include Fitzhugh Mounds and the Raffman site, large Coles Creek–Plaquemine complexes documented by state archaeology guides and peer-reviewed research.

Historic tribes which were encountered by European colonists include the Taensa and Natchez peoples, who both spoke the Natchez language.

=== European settlement to present ===
The parish is named for former U.S. President James Madison. As was typical of northern areas of Louisiana, and especially along the Mississippi River, it was developed for cotton agriculture on large plantations worked by large groups of enslaved African Americans. In 1932 a local news writer stated, "Madison still has plantations. They have not vanished entirely. Good roads dot the parish and some owners live in Tallulah, using automobiles to supervise their extensive holdings. When extra help is needed, trucks are used to carry the negroes back and forth."

Following the Reconstruction era and during the Jim Crow era, white Democrats across the state violently suppressed black voting, which was for Republican candidates, and civil rights. Twelve blacks were lynched in Madison Parish from 1877 to 1950, most near the turn of the 20th century when social and economic tensions were the highest. In addition, in July 1899 five immigrant Sicilian grocers were lynched by whites in Tallulah, the parish seat, for failing to observe Jim Crow customs of serving whites before blacks and because they were competing with locals with their stores.

During the Vicksburg campaign, several operations occurred in Madison Parish. On June 7, 1863, Union and Confederate forces fought the Battle of Milliken's Bend in the parish; the National Park Service notes the battlefield site has since been lost to changes in the Mississippi River channel. On June 15, 1863, Union forces crossed local bayous and burned the then-parish seat of Richmond after the Battle of Richmond, Louisiana. Two canal projects on the Louisiana side—Grant's Canal at Delta and the Duckport Canal near Duckport—were attempted by Union engineers to bypass Confederate batteries at Vicksburg; a remnant of Grant’s Canal is preserved today as a unit of Vicksburg National Military Park.

Civil rights legislation in 1965 enabled more African Americans to exercise their constitutional rights to register and vote in Madison Parish, and they began to elect candidates of their choice to local offices. In 1969 Zelma Wyche was elected as Police Chief of Tallulah. In 1974 Adell Williams was elected as mayor, the first African American to fill this position.

A U.S. Department of Agriculture laboratory and airfield near Tallulah (Shirley/Scott Field) hosted early 1920s crop-dusting experiments against the boll weevil; the airfield is listed on the National Register of Historic Places.

== Geography ==
According to the U.S. Census Bureau, the parish has a total area of 651 square miles (1,690 km^{2}), of which 624 square miles (1,620 km^{2}) is land and 26 square miles (67 km^{2}) (4.1%) is water.

=== Major highways ===
- I-20
- US 65
- US 80
- LA 577
- LA 579
- LA 601
- LA 602-1
- LA 602-2
- LA 603
- LA 610
- LA 860
- LA 861
- LA 3202
- LA 3218

=== Adjacent counties and parishes ===
- East Carroll Parish (north)
- Warren County, Mississippi (east)
- Tensas Parish (south)
- Franklin Parish (southwest)
- Richland Parish (northwest)

=== National protected areas ===
- Tensas River National Wildlife Refuge (portion in Madison, Tensas and Franklin parishes; visitor center ~12 mi SW of Tallulah).
- Vicksburg National Military Park — Grant’s Canal unit at Delta.

== Communities ==
=== Cities ===
- Tallulah (parish seat and largest municipality)

=== Villages ===
- Delta
- Mound
- Richmond

=== Extinct settlements ===
- Duckport
- Milliken's Bend

=== Other communities ===
- Afton
- Thomastown

== Transportation ==
Vicksburg–Tallulah Regional Airport (KTVR) serves the parish near Mound, with a 5,002-ft (1,525 m) runway and general-aviation services. The I-20 Westbound Louisiana Welcome Center at Mound provides traveler services at Exit 182. The welcome center is closed while under construction.

== Demographics ==
Because of limited job opportunities as agriculture has mechanized and the Chicago Lumber Mill closed, the parish population has declined overall by about one-third since its peak in 1980. Numerous African Americans left during the first half of the 20th century in the Great Migration to escape the violence and oppression of Jim Crow; they moved to the North and West. The Census Bureau’s 2024 estimate is 9,093 residents.

Historical population
Census	Pop.	Note	%±
1840	5,142		—
1850	8,773		70.6%
1860	14,133		61.1%
1870	8,600		−39.1%
1880	13,906		61.7%
1890	14,135		1.6%
1900	12,322		−12.8%
1910	10,676		−13.4%
1920	10,829		1.4%
1930	14,829		36.9%
1940	18,443		24.4%
1950	17,451		−5.4%
1960	16,444		−5.8%
1970	15,065		−8.4%
1980	15,975		6.0%
1990	12,463		−22.0%
2000	13,728		10.2%
2010	12,093		−11.9%
2020	10,017		−17.2%
2025 (est.)	8,844	▼	−11.7%
U.S. Decennial Census; 1790-1960 1900-1990; 1990-2000 2010

=== 2020 census ===
As of the 2020 census, there were 10,017 people, 3,732 households, and 2,443 families residing in the parish. The median age was 38.1 years; 25.8% of residents were under the age of 18 and 17.3% of residents were 65 years of age or older. For every 100 females there were 87.2 males, and for every 100 females age 18 and over there were 82.5 males age 18 and over.

Of the 3,732 households, 34.2% had children under the age of 18 living in them; 30.7% were married-couple households, 20.4% were households with a male householder and no spouse or partner present, and 42.9% were households with a female householder and no spouse or partner present. About 32.1% of all households were made up of individuals and 15.0% had someone living alone who was 65 years of age or older.

There were 4,357 housing units, of which 14.3% were vacant. Among occupied housing units, 57.1% were owner-occupied and 42.9% were renter-occupied. The homeowner vacancy rate was 0.9% and the rental vacancy rate was 5.8%.

71.5% of residents lived in urban areas, while 28.5% lived in rural areas.

The racial makeup of the parish was 34.7% White, 62.1% Black or African American, 0.3% American Indian and Alaska Native, 0.1% Asian, <0.1% Native Hawaiian and Pacific Islander, 0.4% from some other race, and 2.3% from two or more races; Hispanic or Latino residents of any race comprised 2.0% of the population.

Out of Louisiana's 64 parishes, it is one of six that have an African-American Majority (2020).

=== Racial and ethnic composition ===
Madison Parish, Louisiana – Racial and ethnic composition Note: the US Census treats Hispanic/Latino as an ethnic category. This table excludes Latinos from the racial categories and assigns them to a separate category. Hispanics/Latinos may be of any race.
Race / Ethnicity (NH = Non-Hispanic)	Pop 1980	Pop 1990	Pop 2000	Pop 2010	Pop 2020	% 1980	% 1990	% 2000	% 2010	% 2020
White alone (NH)	6,353	4,917	5,087	4,396	3,414	39.77%	39.45%	37.06%	36.35%	34.08%
Black or African American alone (NH)	9,293	7,390	8,259	7,357	6,173	58.17%	59.30%	60.16%	60.84%	61.63%
Native American or Alaska Native alone (NH)	5	15	18	23	27	0.03%	0.12%	0.13%	0.19%	0.27%
Asian alone (NH)	15	8	21	26	6	0.09%	0.06%	0.15%	0.22%	0.06%
Native Hawaiian or Pacific Islander alone (NH)	x	x	2	0	5	x	x	0.01%	0.00%	0.05%
Other race alone (NH)	16	7	2	8	4	0.10%	0.06%	0.01%	0.07%	0.04%
Mixed race or Multiracial (NH)	x	x	51	95	184	x	x	0.37%	0.79%	1.84%
Hispanic or Latino (any race)	293	126	288	188	204	1.83%	1.01%	2.10%	1.55%	2.04%
Total	15,975	12,463	13,728	12,093	10,017	100.00%	100.00%	100.00%	100.00%	100.00%

== Politics ==
With its majority-black population, Madison Parish in the 21st century has become a stronghold of support for the Democratic Party. Prior to the passage of the Voting Rights Act of 1965, when the state unconstitutionally prevented blacks from voting, the white Madison Parish voters in 1962 supported the Republican nominee Taylor W. O'Hearn for the US Senate; he lost to powerful Democratic incumbent Russell B. Long. O'Hearn polled 58.7 percent among whites in Madison Parish. He later was elected to the Louisiana House of Representatives from Caddo Parish, also in the northern part of the state.

During the 1970s and 1980s, conservative white voters in Louisiana and other southern states began to shift to supporting Republican presidential candidates, creating a more competitive system than the Solid South. Since the civil rights era, most African Americans in the South have supported Democratic candidates, as the national party supported their drive to exercise constitutional rights as citizens, even though most Southern Democrats remained vehemently opposed to civil rights. In 1988, Governor Michael Dukakis of Massachusetts won in Madison Parish, with 2,416 votes (49.2 percent) compared to Republican Vice President George H. W. Bush, who finished in the presidential contest with 2,334 ballots (47.5 percent).

In 2008, the Democrat Barack Obama of Illinois received 3,100 votes (58.5 percent) in Madison Parish to 2,152 (40.6 percent) for the Republican U.S. Senator John McCain of Arizona. In 2012, Madison Parish gave President Obama 3,154 votes (60.8 percent) to Mitt Romney's 2,000 ballots (38.6 percent), 152 fewer votes than McCain had received four years earlier.

United States presidential election results for Madison Parish, Louisiana
Year	Republican		Democratic		Third party(ies)	
Year	No.	%	No.	%	No.	%
1912	0	0.00%	146	95.42%	7	4.58%
1916	1	0.53%	187	99.47%	0	0.00%
1920	4	1.19%	331	98.81%	0	0.00%
1924	13	4.53%	274	95.47%	0	0.00%
1928	151	32.20%	318	67.80%	0	0.00%
1932	67	10.89%	548	89.11%	0	0.00%
1936	71	6.14%	1,085	93.86%	0	0.00%
1940	182	15.18%	1,017	84.82%	0	0.00%
1944	338	30.67%	764	69.33%	0	0.00%
1948	127	9.30%	197	14.42%	1,042	76.28%
1952	1,253	64.32%	695	35.68%	0	0.00%
1956	461	27.25%	276	16.31%	955	56.44%
1960	629	33.32%	235	12.45%	1,024	54.24%
1964	2,061	83.17%	417	16.83%	0	0.00%
1968	649	11.41%	2,659	46.75%	2,380	41.84%
1972	2,420	49.22%	2,249	45.74%	248	5.04%
1976	2,096	29.41%	4,933	69.21%	99	1.39%
1980	2,531	42.70%	3,264	55.06%	133	2.24%
1984	2,849	48.58%	2,906	49.56%	109	1.86%
1988	2,334	47.53%	2,416	49.20%	161	3.28%
1992	1,702	33.33%	2,773	54.31%	631	12.36%
1996	1,591	31.41%	3,085	60.91%	389	7.68%
2000	2,127	44.85%	2,489	52.48%	127	2.68%
2004	2,291	49.03%	2,334	49.95%	48	1.03%
2008	2,152	40.60%	3,100	58.49%	48	0.91%
2012	2,000	38.56%	3,154	60.81%	33	0.64%
2016	1,927	40.72%	2,744	57.99%	61	1.29%
2020	1,930	41.33%	2,654	56.83%	86	1.84%
2024	1,846	46.24%	2,094	52.45%	52	1.30%

== Education ==
Public schools in Madison Parish are operated by the Madison Parish School Board. There is one private school and one magnet school in the parish.

== Corrections ==
The Madison Parish Sheriff's Office operated Madison Parish Detention Center and the privately operated Louisiana Transitional Center for Women are located in Tallulah.

== Notable people ==
- Madam C. J. Walker
- Buddy Caldwell
- Zelma Wyche
- Adrian Fisher
