= Madison Parish School Board =

School district in Louisiana, United States

Coordinates: 32.4063°N 91.1897°W

- Tallulah High School
- U.S. National Register of Historic Places
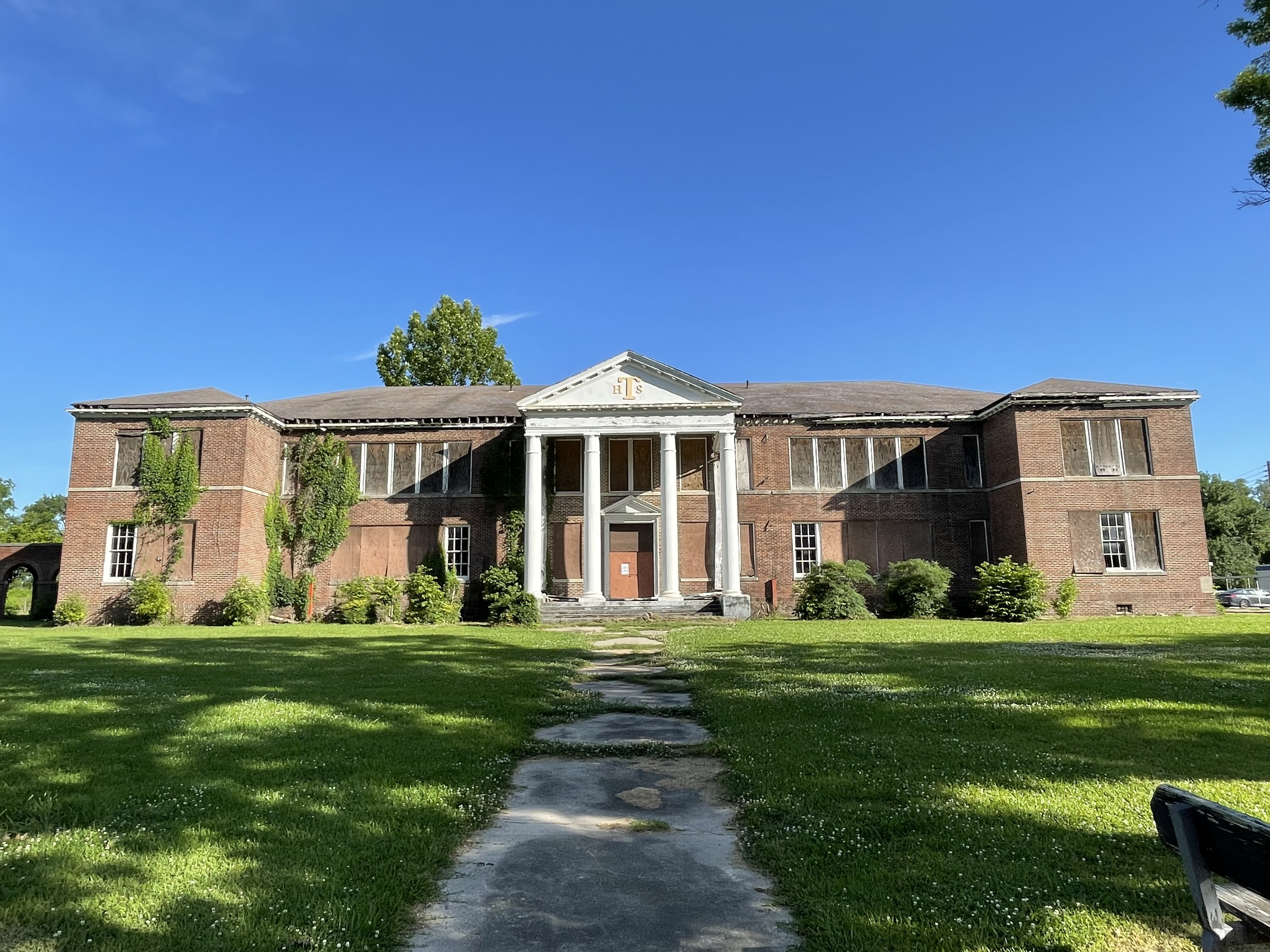

- Location within Louisiana
- Location: 603 Bayou Dr., Tallulah, Louisiana
- Area: 2.3 acres (0.93 ha)
- Built: 1927
- Architects: Smith, J.W.
- Architectural style: Classical Revival
- NRHP reference No.: 13000693
- Added to NRHP: September 10, 2013

The Madison Parish School Board is an entity responsible for the operation of public schools in Madison Parish, Louisiana, United States. It is headquartered in the city of Tallulah.

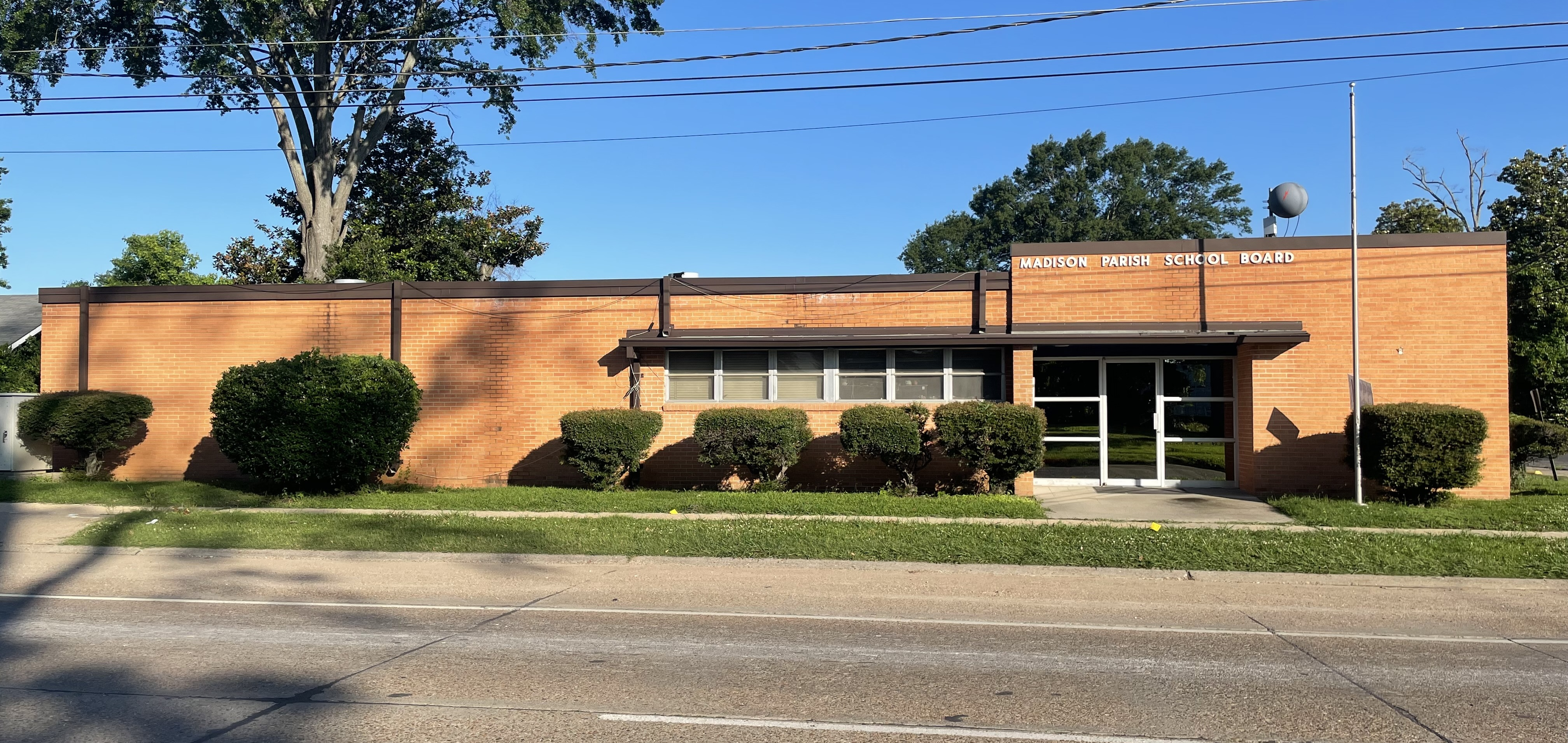
Madison Parish School Board central office in Tallulah, Louisiana.

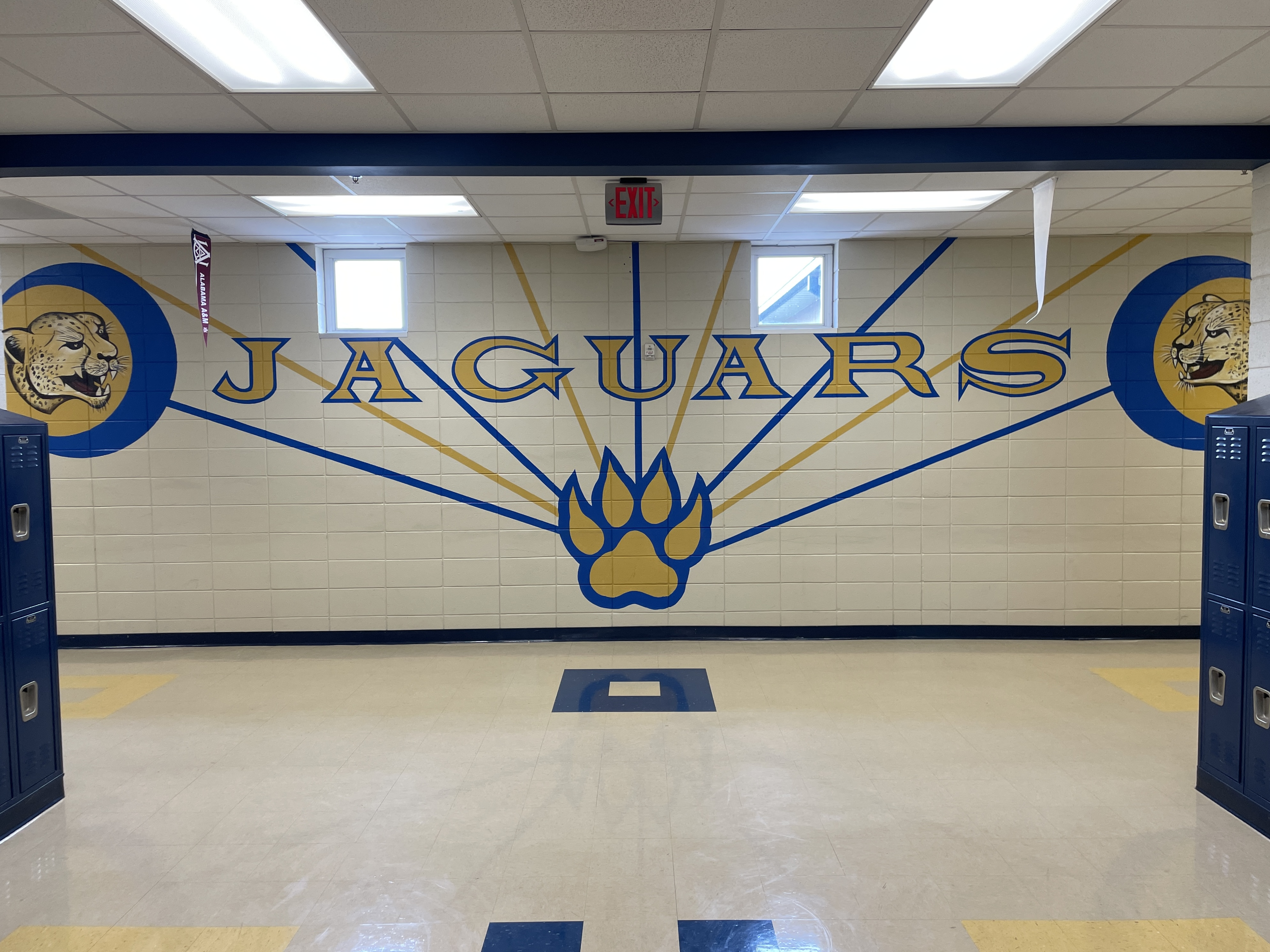
Madison Parish Schools in Madison Parish, Louisiana.

== Schools ==
=== Secondary schools ===
- Grades 9-12
  - Madison High School (Tallulah) (Jaguars)
- Grades 6-8
  - Madison Middle School (Tallulah)

=== Primary schools ===
- Grades PK-5
  - Wright Elementary School (Tallulah)

=== Other Campuses ===
- Grades 6-12
  - Christian Acres Alternative School (Unincorporated area)

== Demographics ==
- Total Students (as of Febuary 1, 2026): 1,083
- Gender
  - Male: 51.2%
  - Female: 48.8%
- Race/Ethnicity
  - African American: 95.01%
  - White: 1.75%
  - Hispanic: 1.20%
  - Asian: 0.74%
  - Multiple Races (Non-Hispanic): 1.29%
- Socio-Economic Indicators
  - Economically Disadvantaged: 95.10%

== See also ==
- List of school districts in Louisiana
