= Battle of Lake Providence =

Battle of the American Civil War

Coordinates: 32°48′35.44″N 91°11′36.21″W

- Part of the Trans-Mississippi Theater of the American Civil War
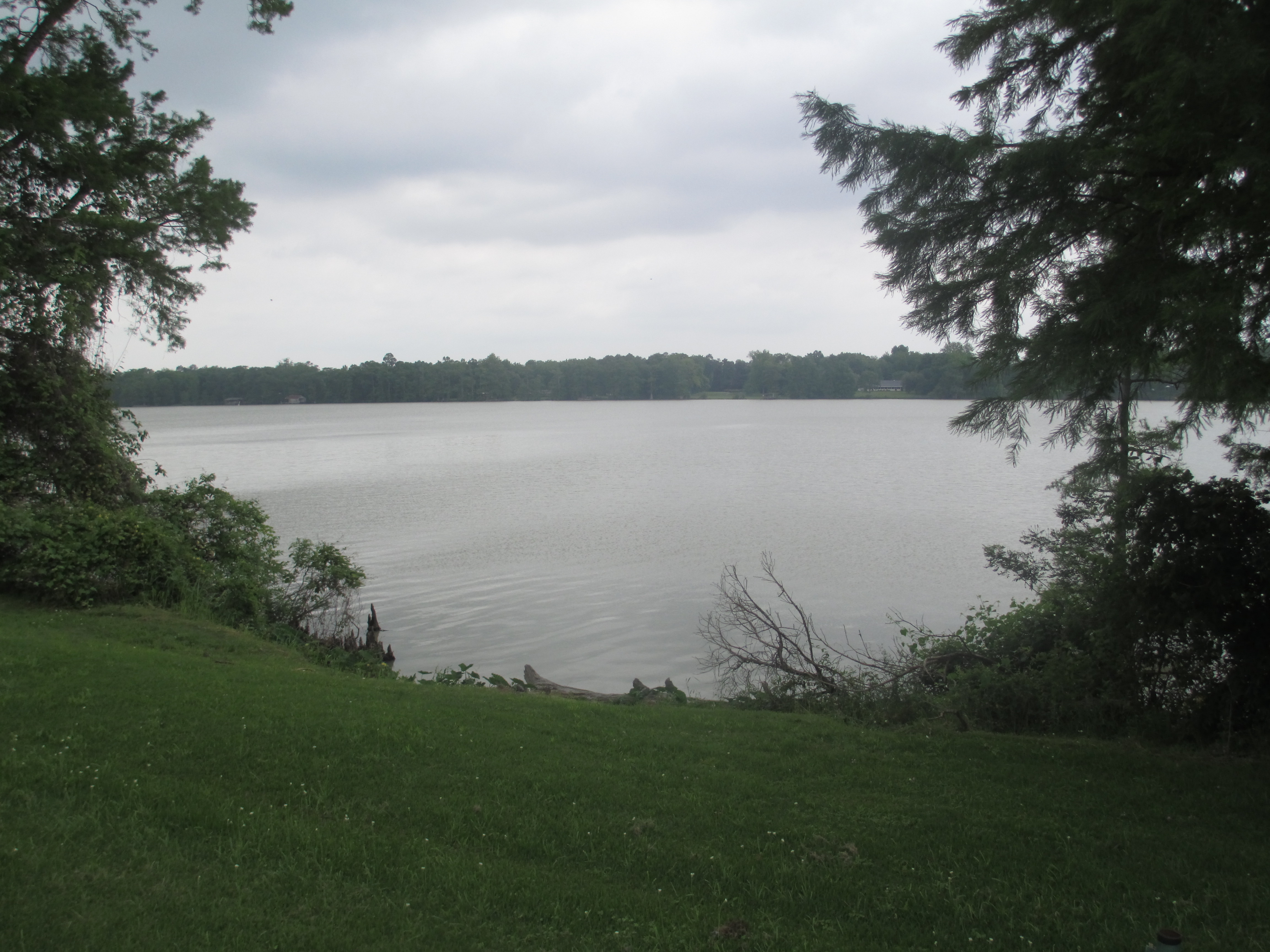
- Lake Providence, Louisiana
Date	June 9, 1863
Location	Near Lake Providence, Louisiana
Result	Union victory

Belligerents
United States (Union)	(Confederate States of America) CSA (Confederacy)

Commanders and leaders
Hugh T. Reid	Frank Bartlett

Strength
800	900

Casualties and losses
1 wounded	2 killed 5 wounded

The Battle of Lake Providence was fought on June 9, 1863, during the Vicksburg campaign of the American Civil War. Confederate troops from the Trans-Mississippi Department were trying to relieve Union pressure during the Siege of Vicksburg. Major General Richard Taylor, primarily using Walker's Greyhounds, prepared a three-pronged attack against Union positions at Milliken's Bend, Young's Point, and Lake Providence, which was scheduled to take place on June 7. The strike against Lake Providence was conducted by 900 men led by Colonel Frank Bartlett.

Bartlett's force crossed Bayou Macon two days late. The Confederates encountered a Union picket force six miles (10 km) from their destination. The Union pickets withdrew, alerted Union commander Brigadier General Hugh T. Reid, and while withdrawing burned the bridge over Bayou Tensas. The Confederates were halted at Bayou Tensas by the wrecked bridge, and before the structure could be rebuilt, Reid arrived with his main force. A Confederate cannon was driven off by Union fire, and Bartlett withdrew his men at dusk. The attack against Lake Providence accomplished little, the strike against Milliken's Bend was defeated in the Battle of Milliken's Bend, and little came of the movement against Young's Point. Vicksburg surrendered on July 4.

== Background ==
In early 1863, during the American Civil War, Major General Ulysses S. Grant of the Union Army began a campaign against Vicksburg, Mississippi, which was held by Confederate troops. In late April, the Union troops crossed the Mississippi River from Louisiana to Mississippi, south of Vicksburg. By May 18, Grant's troops had surrounded Vicksburg and placed the city under siege. During the early part of the campaign, Grant had operated a supply depot at Milliken's Bend in Louisiana, but this decreased in importance, as by the time of the siege, he had established a different supply line. Grant still kept minor supply points there and also at Young's Point and Lake Providence in Louisiana; the sites were also used to train newly-recruited United States Colored Troops (USCT). The USCT troops were not intended to be used as front-line combat soldiers, and were poorly armed and trained. The positions were also garrisoned by white troops.

Jefferson Davis, the Confederate president, pressured E. Kirby Smith, the commander of the Trans-Mississippi Department, to undertake an offensive in Louisiana to take some of the pressure off Vicksburg. The Confederates did not know at this time that events had rendered Milliken's Bend of lower importance to Grant. The Confederate Trans-Mississippi effort to help Vicksburg would be conducted by Major General Richard Taylor, using an infantry division from Texas known as Walker's Greyhounds. Taylor preferred a strike against New Orleans, Louisiana, and conducted the campaign with subdued enthusiasm. Taylor's men had previously withdrawn up the Red River, but the Union forces operating on the Red River had transferred to the Port Hudson, Louisiana, area. The withdrawal of these troops allowed the Confederates greater freedom to operate against Grant's posts in Louisiana. Taylor's command, after it had been reinforced by Walker, was to advance up Bayou Tensas. Confederate cavalry occupied Richmond, Louisiana, on June 3; Major General John George Walker's troops reached Richmond on June 6; and Taylor planned a three-pronged strike for the next day: Confederate troops were to attack Milliken's Bend, Young's Point, and Lake Providence. The selection of Lake Providence included some political motivations: Confederates viewed the training of USCT to be the fomenting of a slave rebellion, and some of the locals were trading with the Union from the produce of their plantations. Confederate troops had been active in the area since May under the leadership of Brigadier General Paul O. Hébert. While Hébert's troops were able to harass the Union forces at Lake Providence, they lacked the strength to make an all-out attack.

== Battle ==
Vicksburg, Richmond, and Lake Providence

For the strike at Lake Providence, Hébert's command was strengthened by the detachment of the 13th Texas Cavalry Regiment from Walker's division. The regiment had no prior combat experience and had been dismounted in early 1863. It fought as infantry for the rest of the war. The operation was commanded by Colonel Frank Bartlett, who was responsible for Confederate forces operating in the Lake Providence area, and consisted of the 13th Louisiana Cavalry Battalion and the 13th Texas Cavalry, a force totaling about 900 men. Bartlett had orders to destroy the Union camp at Lake Providence and then destroy the Union-run plantations between that point and Milliken's Bend. The Confederate forces gathered at Floyd, Louisiana, where a bridge across Bayou Macon was constructed. However, Bartlett decided to cross the bayou elsewhere, instead moving his troops to Caledonia, which was 18 miles (29 km) upstream. The historian Warren Grabau states that Bartlett chose not to cross at the new bridge because the only road between there and Lake Providence was in poor condition and could easily be blocked by a small opposing force. The terrain traversed between Floyd and Caledonia consisted of thick woods and canebrakes. Another bridge had to be built at Caledonia. The Confederates finally crossed Bayou Macon on June 9, two days late.

After crossing the bayou, Bartlett struck a Union outpost at Bunch's Bend on the Mississippi River and then continued along the shore of an oxbow lake, also known as Lake Providence. Only 600 Confederates were present for this stage of the advance. When the Confederates reached Bayou Baxter, six miles (9.7 km) from their objective, they made contact with a picket force consisting of two companies from the 1st Kansas Mounted Infantry Regiment. Outnumbered, the Kansans withdrew, and a messenger informed Brigadier General Hugh T. Reid, the Union commander at Lake Providence, of the Confederate advance. The Union soldiers' repeated attempts to make a stand during the fighting withdrawal were not successful, and the position at Bayou Baxter fell to the Confederates. The withdrawing Union forces crossed Bayou Tensas and destroyed the bridge over it. Bartlett halted his cavalry at the bridge to allow the infantry to catch up. The historian Thomas Reid suggests that if Bartlett's cavalry had pushed ahead while the Union forces were destroying the bridge, they could have made a lodgment on the east side of the bayou. During this stage of the action between first contact and the Union withdrawal across Bayou Tensas, the Confederates captured 9 supply wagons and 36 mules.

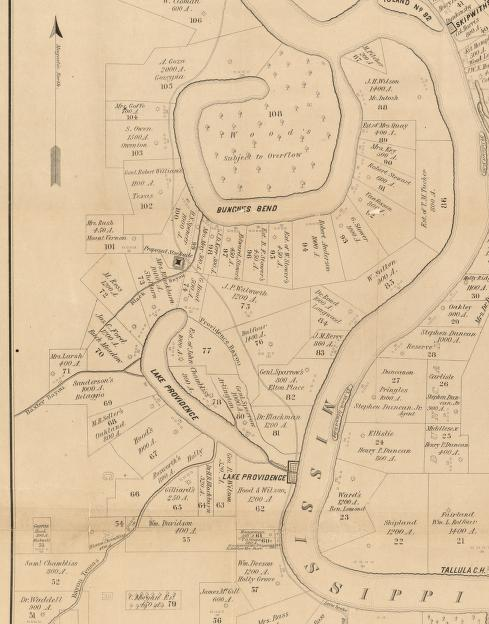
Period map showing location of Bunch's Bend, Bayou Baxter, Bayou Tensas, and Lake Providence

Having learned of the Confederate advance, Reid brought up his full 800-man force. Bayou Tensas was only 1 mile (1.6 km) from the town. The Confederates sent out skirmishers and deployed a 6-pounder field gun while military pioneers attempted to rebuild the bridge. Before this could be completed, Reid's force arrived. The Union commander deployed men from the 1st Kansas and the 16th Wisconsin Infantry Regiments, and Union sharpshooters were sent forward. About 400 Union soldiers were engaged at this time. Union fire drove off the crew of the Confederate cannon after the piece fired five shots.

The two sides continued to shoot at each other across Bayou Tensas for another hour and a half with little effect. At dusk, Bartlett withdrew most of the Confederate force, leaving behind Company B of the 13th Texas and some of the Louisianans as a rear guard. Reid withdrew his previously-engaged men and deployed the 8th Louisiana Infantry Regiment (African Descent), a USCT unit. The Union unit fired several volleys into the Confederate rear guard, which withdrew. Bartlett believed that Reid had more men than he actually had and did not attempt to cross Bayou Tensas downstream from the Union position, although historian John D. Winters believes such a movement would have been feasible.

== Aftermath ==
One Union soldier was wounded during the fight, while the Confederates lost two men killed and five wounded. The Confederates withdrew from the field by a different way than they had come, and they crossed Bayou Macon at the bridge at Floyd that Bartlett had earlier chosen not to use. By June 10, Bartlett's men were back at Floyd; the only thing they had accomplished during the affair was the destruction of a cotton gin, which was burned during the retreat from Lake Providence. The attack on Milliken's Bend had been defeated in the Battle of Milliken's Bend on June 7, and little came of the strike against Young's Point. Winters blames Taylor for the failure of the Confederate offensive, suggesting that he should instead have concentrated his troops. While Taylor broke off his campaign, Walker's men remained in the area. Walker withdrew from Richmond after his men were attacked on June 15. Confederate troops captured a small Union camp in the area in the Battle of Goodrich's Landing on June 29 but were driven off the next day. Vicksburg surrendered on July 4; the fall of the city represented a major Confederate defeat.

== Sources ==
- Bearss, Edwin C. (1991) [1986]. The Campaign for Vicksburg. Vol. III: Unvexed to the Sea. Dayton, Ohio: Morningside Bookshop. ISBN 0-89029-516-6.
- Bearss, Edwin C. (1998). "Battle and Siege of Vicksburg, Mississippi". In Kennedy, Frances H. (ed.). The Civil War Battlefield Guide (2nd ed.). Boston/New York: Houghton Mifflin. pp. 164–167. ISBN 978-0-395-74012-5.
- Frazier, Donald S. (2015). Blood on the Bayou: Vicksburg, Port Hudson, and the Trans-Mississippi. Buffalo Gap, Texas: State House Press. ISBN 978-1-933337-62-3.
- Grabau, Warren (2000). Ninety-eight Days: A Geographer's View of the Vicksburg Campaign. Knoxville, Tennessee: University of Tennessee Press. ISBN 978-1-57233-068-9.
- Kennedy, Frances H., ed. (1998). The Civil War Battlefield Guide (2nd ed.). Boston/New York: Houghton Mifflin. ISBN 978-0-395-74012-5.
- Lowe, Richard (2004). Walker's Texas Division C.S.A.: Greyhounds of the Trans-Mississippi. Baton Rouge, Louisiana: Louisiana State University Press. ISBN 0-8071-3153-9.
- Miller, Donald L. (2019). Vicksburg: Grant's Campaign that Broke the Confederacy. New York, New York: Simon and Schuster. ISBN 978-1-4516-4139-4.
- Reid, Thomas (2005). Spartan Band: Burnett's 13th Texas Cavalry in the Civil War. Denton, Texas: University of North Texas Press. ISBN 1-57441-189-6.
- Smith, Timothy B. (2021). The Siege of Vicksburg: Climax of the Campaign to Open the Mississippi River, May 23 – July 4, 1863. Lawrence, Kansas: University Press of Kansas. ISBN 978-0-7006-3226-8.
- Winschel, Terrence J. (1998). "Chickasaw Bayou, Mississippi". In Kennedy, Frances H. (ed.). The Civil War Battlefield Guide (2nd ed.). Boston/New York: Houghton Mifflin. pp. 154–156. ISBN 978-0-395-74012-5.
- Winters, John D. (1991) [1963]. The Civil War in Louisiana. Baton Rouge, Louisiana: Louisiana State University Press. ISBN 0-8071-1725-0.
