= Live Oak Creamery =

Historic Creamery in Santa Clara County, California, United States

- U.S. National Register of Historic Places
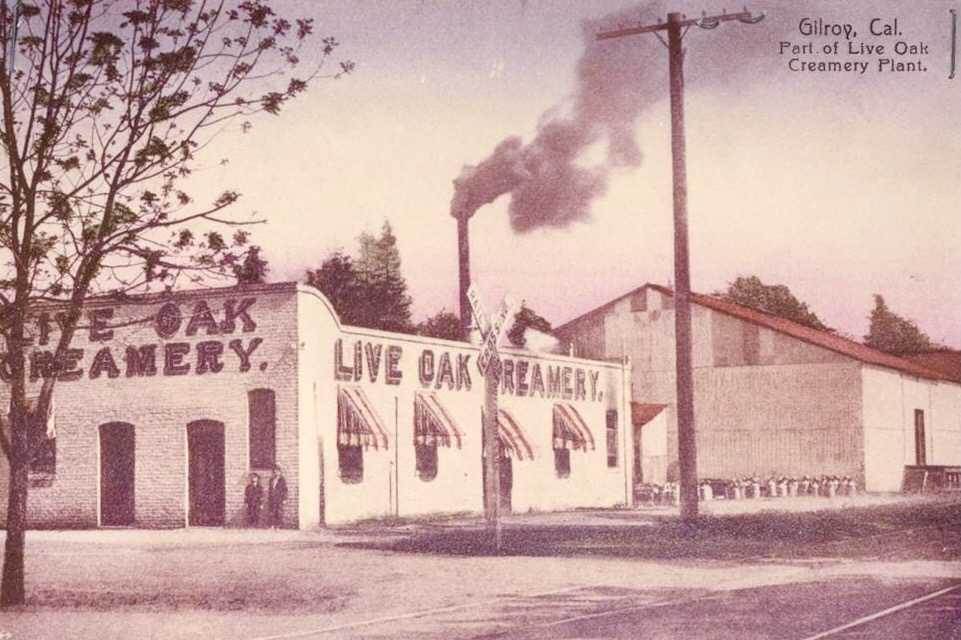
- Live Oak Creamery postcard ca. 1908

- Location within California
- Location: 88 Martin Street, Gilroy, California, US
- Coordinates: 37°00′30″N 121°34′05″W
- Built: 1908
- Architectural style: False front commercial
- NRHP reference No.: 82002263
- Added to NRHP: March 11, 1982

The Live Oak Creamery was a historic creamery in Gilroy, California that was established in 1908. The creamery is best known as Gilroy's first butter factory and only insulated structure in the vicinity. During the 1920s and 1930s, the creamery played a role in cheese processing. The Live Oak Creamery was placed on the National Register of Historic Places on March 11, 1982.

== History ==
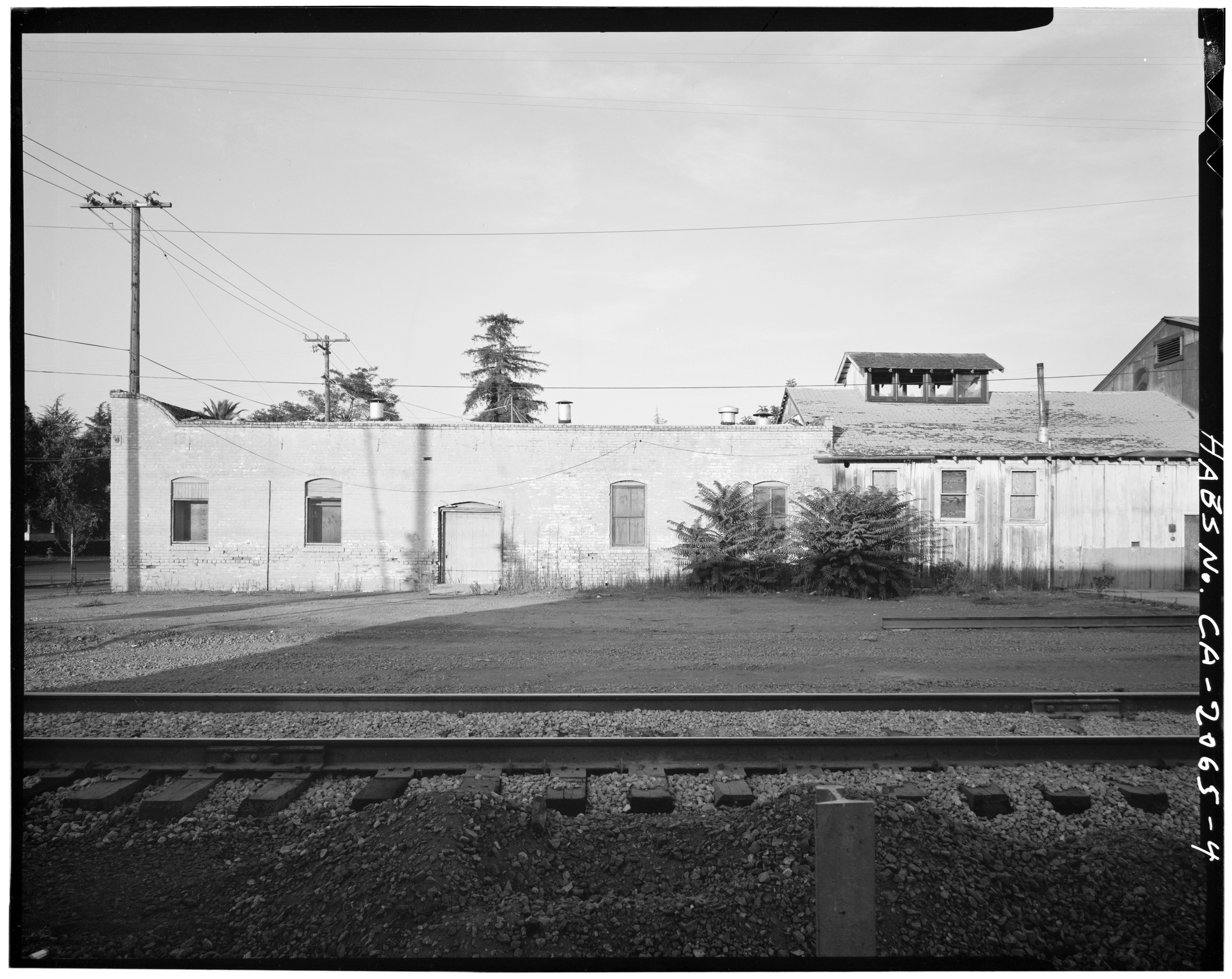
The Live Oak Creamery from the west flank from across the railroad tracks.

Design for the Live Oak Creamery, 88 Martin Street, Gilroy, Santa Clara County.

Colonel Oscar Eugene Learnard (1832-1911), after serving two terms in the Kansas Senate, relocated to California, where he owned approximately 1,000 acres of farmland located roughly four miles west of Gilroy in the Solis district. His son Tracy was actively engaged in the dairy industry. In 1907, they started a creamery on their western Gilroy property, producing butter bearing the "Live Oak" brand name. The creamery was equipped with the latest and most advanced machinery. Subsequently, Tracy acquired a piece of land at the intersection of Martin and Railroad streets in Gilroy, where he oversaw the constructed of a state-of-the-art creamery facility, called the Live Oak Creamery. On March 30, 1908, the first batch of butter was made.

The Live Oak Creamery had a one-story, false front commercial-style design with a rectangular floor plan, measuring approximately 37.2 ft (11.3 m) in width and 96.2 ft (29.3 m) in length. The initial structure was a simple, insulated brick building. Subsequent expansions included a refrigeration room with one-foot-thick walls, a packaging and processing room, a milk sales area, and a milk arrival and testing room. These additional sections were constructed with wooden frames and finished with stucco surfaces.

This facility had the capacity to produce up to 1,000 pounds of butter each day. On November 6, 1911, Learnard died, and ownership of the creamery transferred to his wife, Mary and their son Tracy, who successfully managed the creamery for several years. By 1917, William Garlock was appointed as the creamery's manager. Under his leadership, significant upgrades were made, including the installation of a pasteurizer and homogenizer in 1919. In 1920–1921, Garlock & Cook acquired the Live Oak Creamery from Mary Learnard. It was during the early 1920s that the creamery diversified its production to include cheese.

Walter Luchessa, originally trained as a cheesemaker in his native Switzerland, immigrated to the Gilroy area in 1919 and was subsequently hired. In 1925, Walter, along with his three brothers, Peter, Alessio, and Quinto, purchased the factory from Crook. Walter assumed the role of running the business, while his brothers became investors. This transition marked the discontinuation of butter and cream production, as the Luchessa family focused on crafting Monterey Jack and cheddar cheeses. Taking advantage of the Southern Pacific Railroad, the Luchessas loaded their cheeses directly onto railroad cars for distribution throughout California. In the mid-1930s, the Luchessas leased the cheese factory to the Zottola Brothers, who continued the cheese-making enterprise. The Zottola Brothers also operated a retail store where they sold cheese, butter, and cream. Their establishment marked the last of the cheese-making businesses in Gilroy.

In 1945, the Creamery discontinued its original operations. Subsequently, it underwent a series of transformations, serving as an electrician's workshop, a loan shark's office, a laundromat, and even a Jehovah Witness's Hall under various owners. In 1976, it was repurposed for the craft of making spinning wheels.

In November 1984, a fire gutted the wood-and-brick creamery building.

The Live Oak Creamery holds historical significance and was placed on the National Register of Historic Places on March 11, 1982. It is historically significant under the criterion of California history as being Gilroy's first butter factory and only insulated structure in the region, serving a time when the dairy industry played a major role in the Gilroy's economy.

== Gallery ==
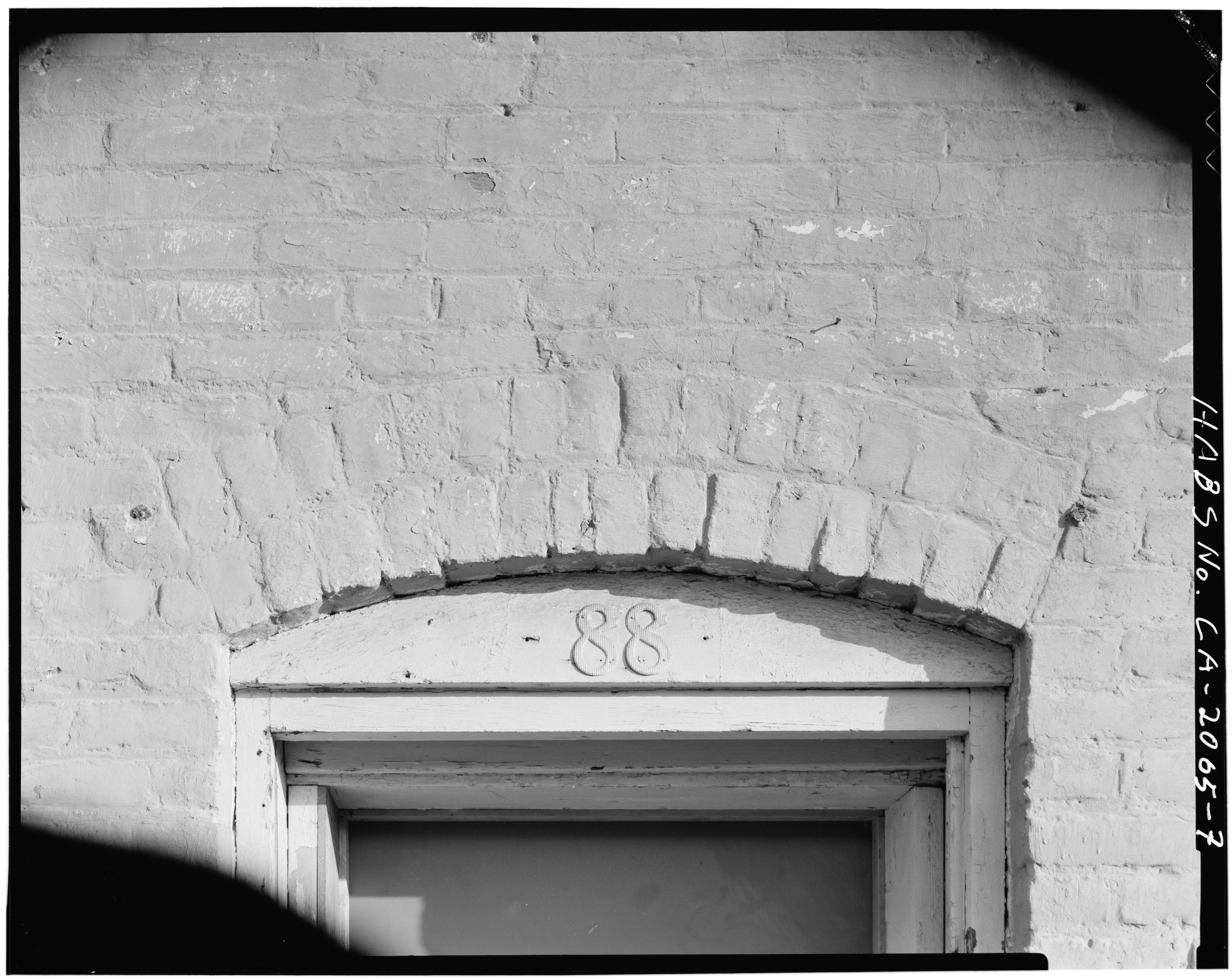
Arch over entrance, north wall

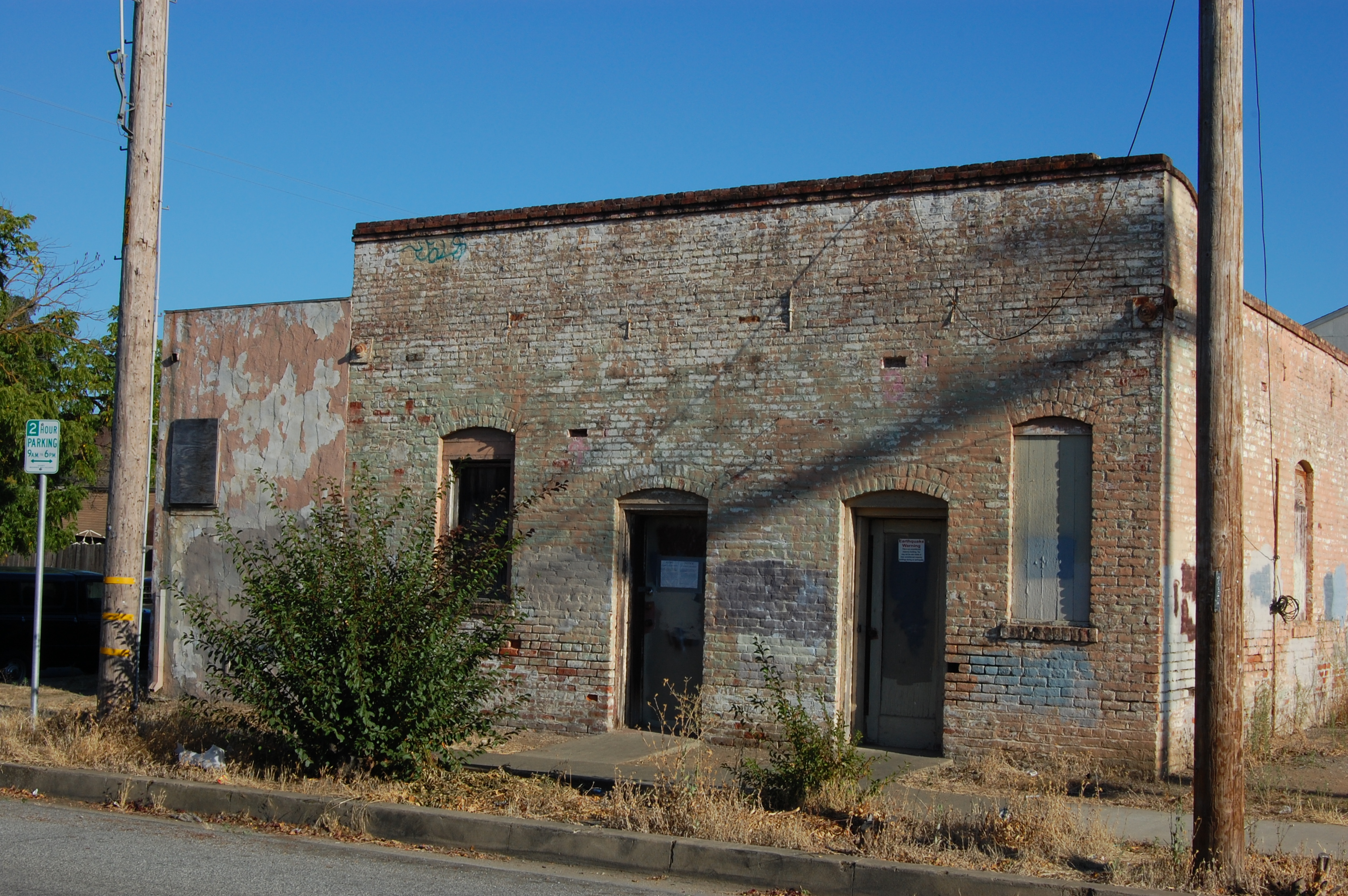
Live Oak Creamery

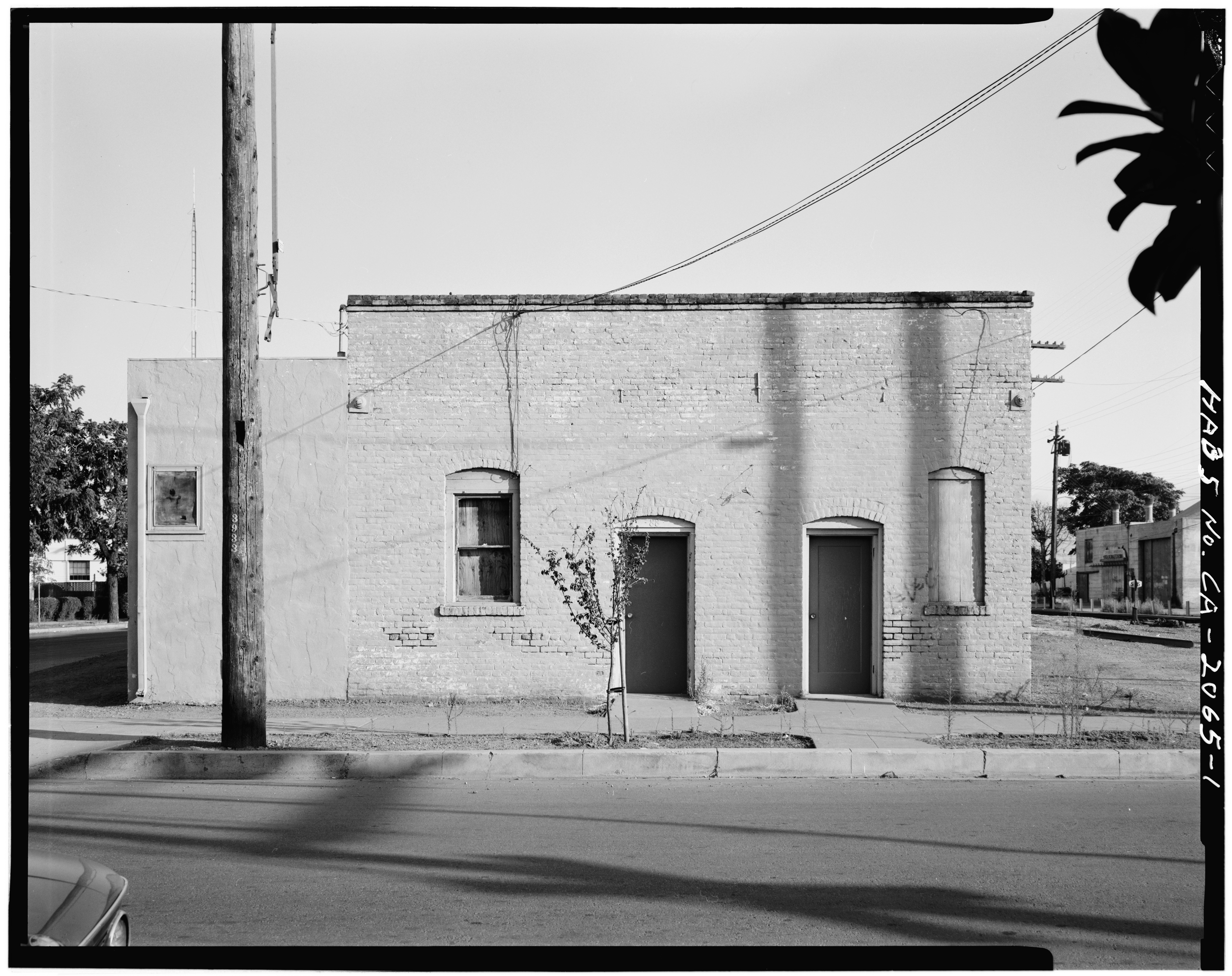
North Front of Live Oak Creamery

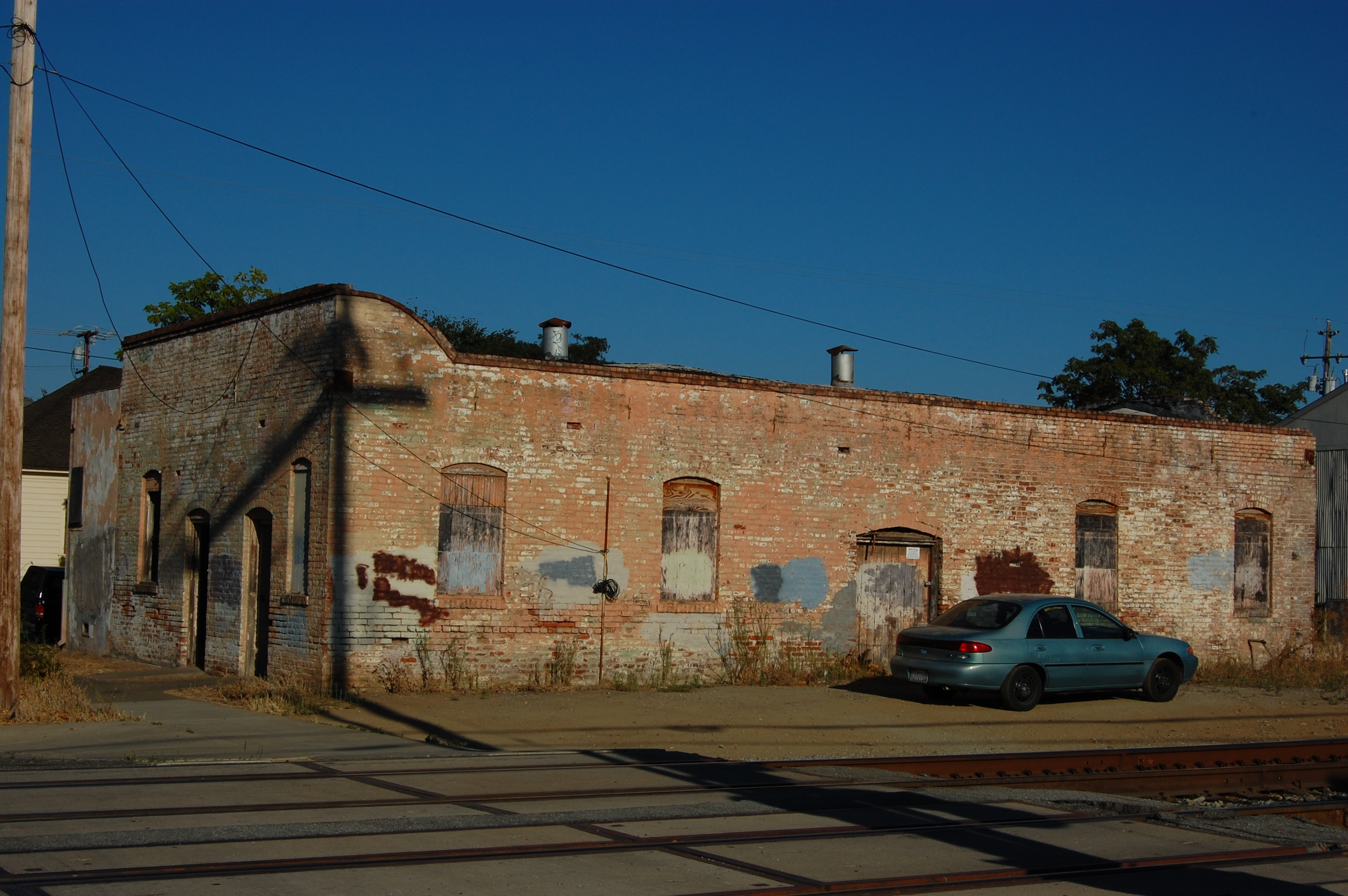
Gilroy-Live Oak Creamery

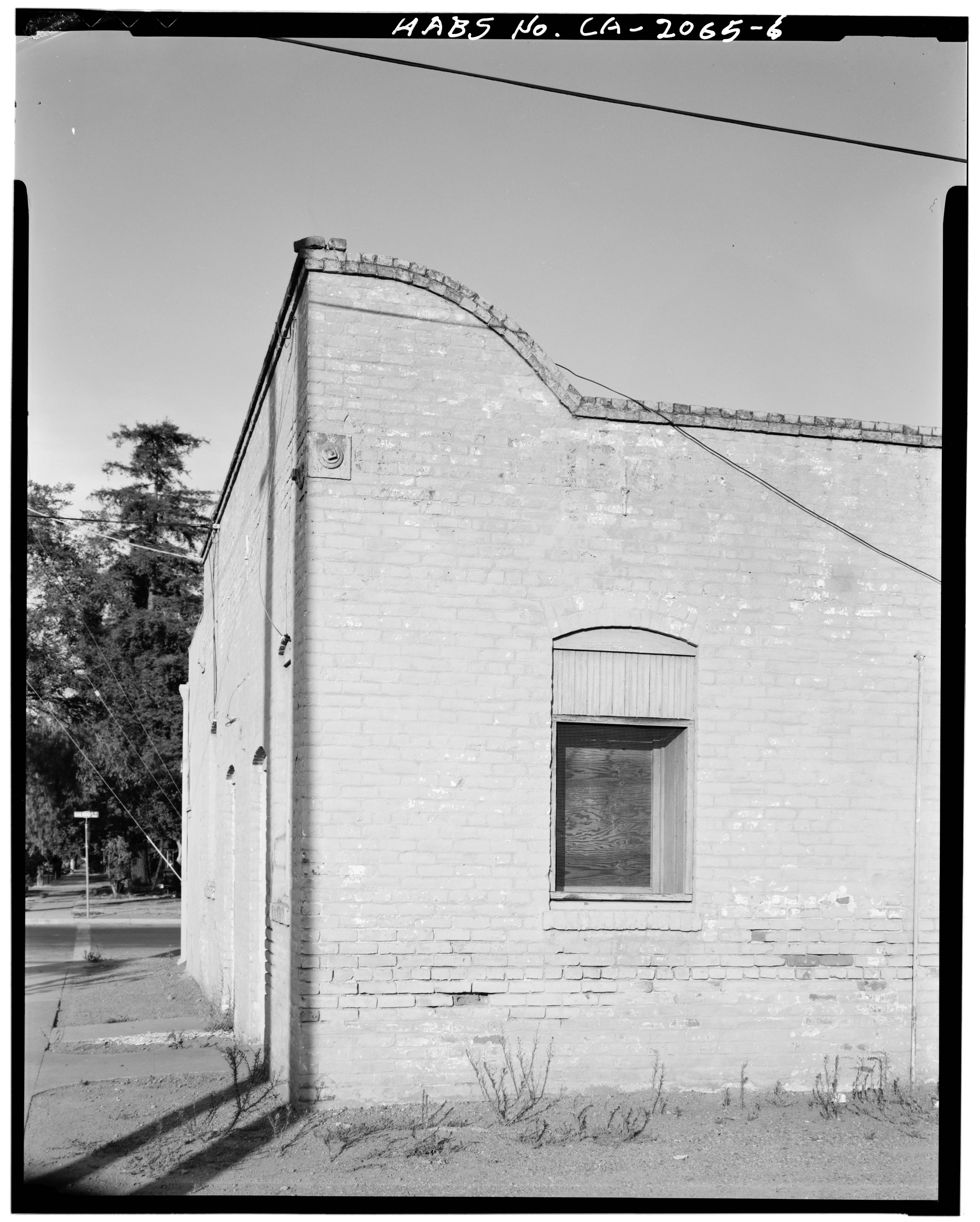
Northwest corner detail with west window

== See also ==
- List of cheesemakers
- List of dairy products
- National Register of Historic Places listings in Santa Clara County, California
