= Lishan Laomu =

Chinese goddess of Mount Li

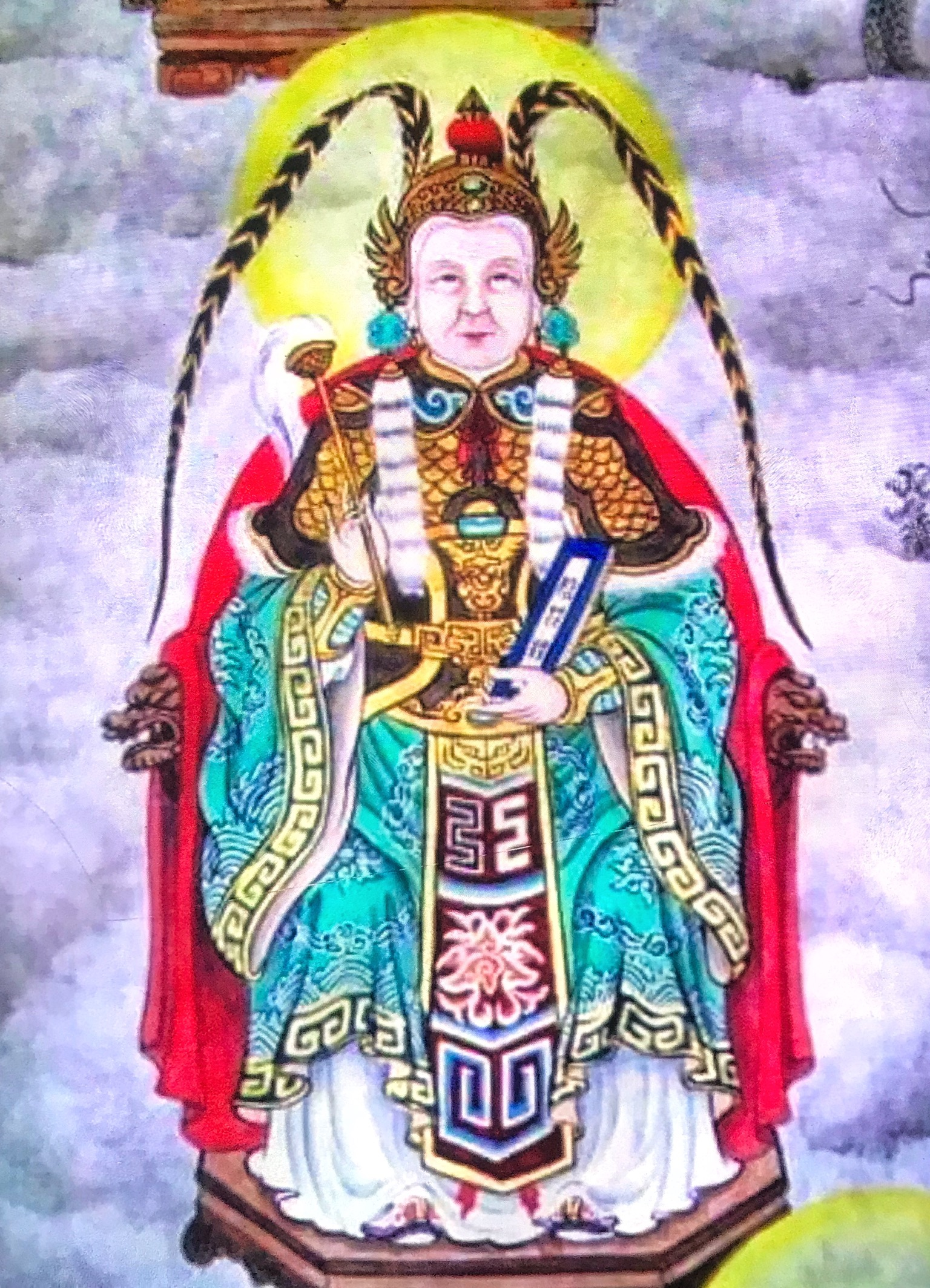
- The painting picture of Lishan Laomu
- Traditional Chinese: 驪山老母
- Simplified Chinese: 骊山老母
- Literal meaning: The Old Mother of Mount Li
Transcriptions
Standard Mandarin
- Hanyu Pinyin: Líshān Lǎomǔ

Lishan Laomu (Chinese: 驪山老母/黎山老母/梨山老母; lit. 'The Old Mother of Mount Li') is the goddess of Mount Li in Chinese religion. She is a popular female immortal in the Taoist pantheon, and a high-ranking one according to some late sources. Legend has it that Lishan Laomu, whose surname and origin remain mysterious, is a supremely elevated female immortal dwelling deep within the Mount Li. Her origins are said to derive from Nüwa, the legendary creator and mother goddess.

Lishan Laomu is rarely mentioned in Taoist scriptures. She holds considerable influence in Chinese folklore, with many Taoist temples dedicating incense to her. She is often confused or equated with other deities such as Queen Mother of the West (Wangmu Niangniang), Wusheng Laomu, Doumu Yuanjun, Taiyi Yuanjun (Xuan Miao Yuniang), and Jiutian Xuannü. Alternatively, she might be considered a deity derived from the evolution of their divine attributes.

== Legends ==
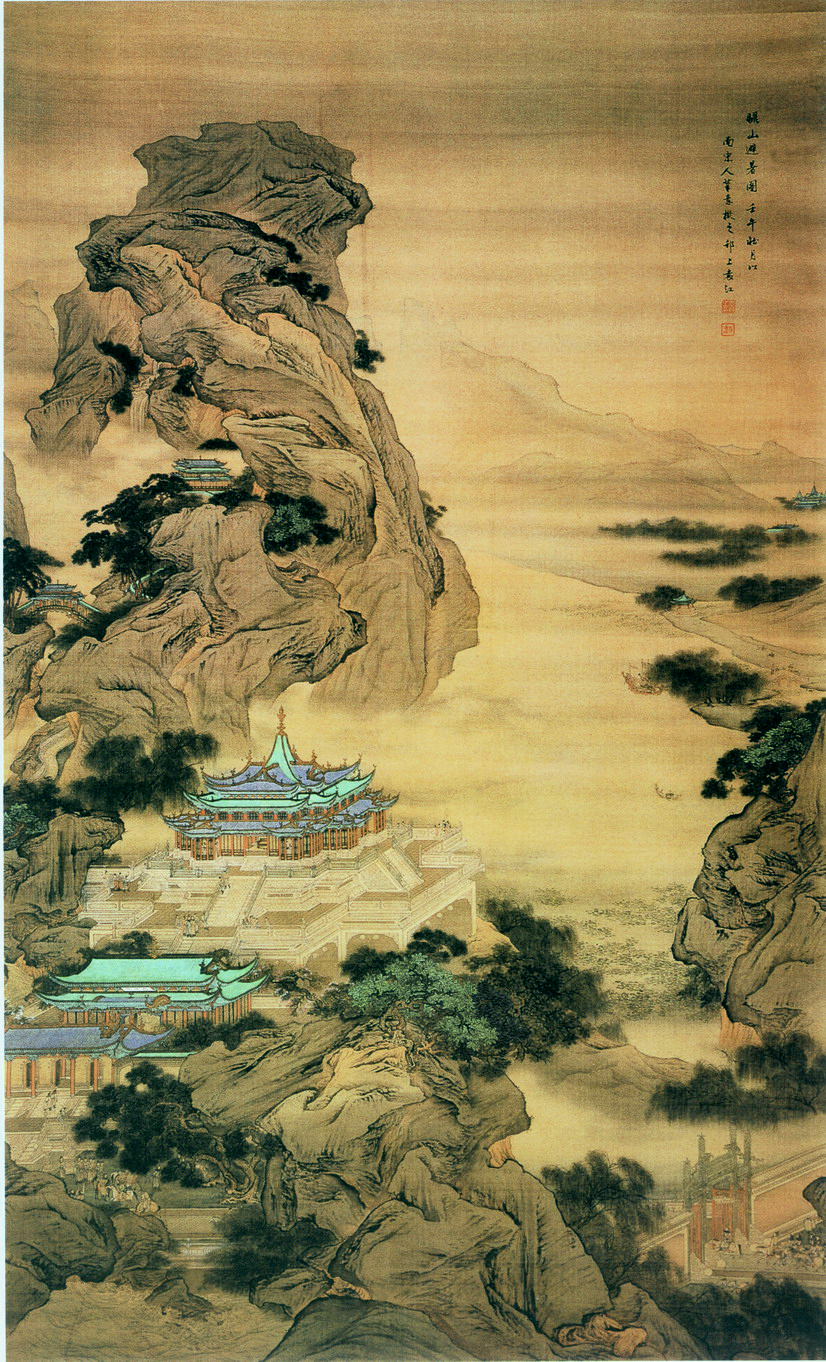
Mount Li Escaping the Heat, hanging scroll, color on silk (Yuan Jiang, 1702)

Lishan Laomu is one of the more popular nüxian (女仙, ′female celestial/immortal′) revered in the Chinese folk religion or Taoist belief. The Lishan Laomu legend consists of an accretion of a number of stories about her.

The ancient origins of Lishan Laomu appears lost to "time immemorial". A certain woman of Lishan living at the end of the Shang dynasty has been proposed as a historical prototype by a late Qing dynasty scholar Yu Yue (d. 1907), who insisted the personage was real and not fictional. However recent scholars have skeptically labeled it as conjecture without firm proof. (Note: Song, Wang & Li (1994), pp. 236–238, cited by Chen (2007), p. 107, n15.) (Note: In the past, Schafer (1956), p. 73 and n142 did accept the historical identification from The Book of Han: "the ′Woman of Mount Li,′reputed to have reigned as Child of Heaven at the end of the Shang Dynasty, a fit mate for the omnipotent monarch of Ch'in".) The historical figure is recorded in the Shiji (Records of the Grand Historian) and Hanshu (The Book of Han). The older text, the Shiji from the Former Han period, states that the Marquis of Shen (申候), ruler during the Zhou dynasty had a certain woman ancestor born at Mount Li, who married a western barbarian chieftain named Xuxuan (胥轩); (Note: Wade-Giles: Hsü-hsüan) Xuxuan then swore fealty to Zhou dynasty China and guarded the Western March (西陲), thus bringing the western peoples (the xirong 西戎) (Note: Pinyin:xirong or Western rong; Wade-Giles: "The Western Jung" is the rendering used by Nienhauser.) under control. The Later Han (Eastern Han) compilation Han shu stated that the "Lady of Li Mountain" once ruled as the Child of Heaven between the Shang (17th-11th cent. BC) and Zhou (11th. cent.-221 BC) dynasties. (Note: Cullen (mis)translates as "between the Yin and Shang dynasties", but those are two names of the same dynasty, and the Chinese text Cullen supplies clearly state "between Yin ((殷) and Zhou (周)". Schafer paraphrases as "at the end of the Shang dynasty".)

A divine woman or "nymph" (神女) associated with the hot spring west or northwest of Mount Li was encountered by the first emperor of China Qin Shi Huang from the nearby capital city of Xianyang, according to a lost Late Han source, the San Qinji (三秦記, ′Record of the Three Qin′), and scholars believe this "nymph" should be identified with Lishan Laomu. (Note: The relevant fragment from the San Qinji survived quoted in other sources, namely Chang'an zhi attributed to Song Minqiu (宋敏求, d. 1079), Commentary on the Water Classic (Shuijingzhu, 水經注), and the Song dynasty leishu encyclopedia Taiping Yulan.) At the time of the First Emperor, there was a crossway of eighty li to Mount Li, and people walked over the bridge, carts drove under the bridge. The pillars of metal and stone could still be seen. (Note: Tudi ji (土地記), as cited/quoted by the Chang'an zhi, Book 15.) (Note: The details about the bridge is part of a more extended quote from San Qinji regarding the First Emperor's encounter, according to the Taiping Yulan. However, the same details derive from Tudi ji, according to the Chang'an zhi.) To the west (or northwest) of Mt. Li, there are hot springs, and it is said that Qin Shi Huang cavorted with (had sex with) the divine woman or "nymph" there. As he was ill-mannered, the goddess spat at him, causing sores to develop. The First Emperor apologized, and the divine woman made a hot spring appear, which cured his illness. Because of that, later generations used to bathe there. (Note: Schafer apud Chang'an zhi [Book] 15, 5b.) (Note: The Chinese text quoted in the Taiping Yulan states "to the west lies a hot spring" (西有溫泉), but the Commentary on the Water Classic and the Chang'an zhi 15 state "northwest" (西北), Yet Schafer states: "The springs are situated on the lower northeast slopes of Mount Li-Blackhorse Mountain", even while citing Chang'an zhi.)

During the Tang dynasty, Taoist Li Quan was a military governor fond of the way of the immortals who often travelled to spiritual places in the mountains; according to legend, he met with Lishan Laomu at the foot of Lishan Mountain, and Laomu taught him the Huangdi Yinfujing (The Yellow Emperor's Scripture on "Unconscious Unification"). (Note: Jiu tuji (舊圖經, 'old map guides'), as cited/quoted by the Chang'an zhi Book 16.)

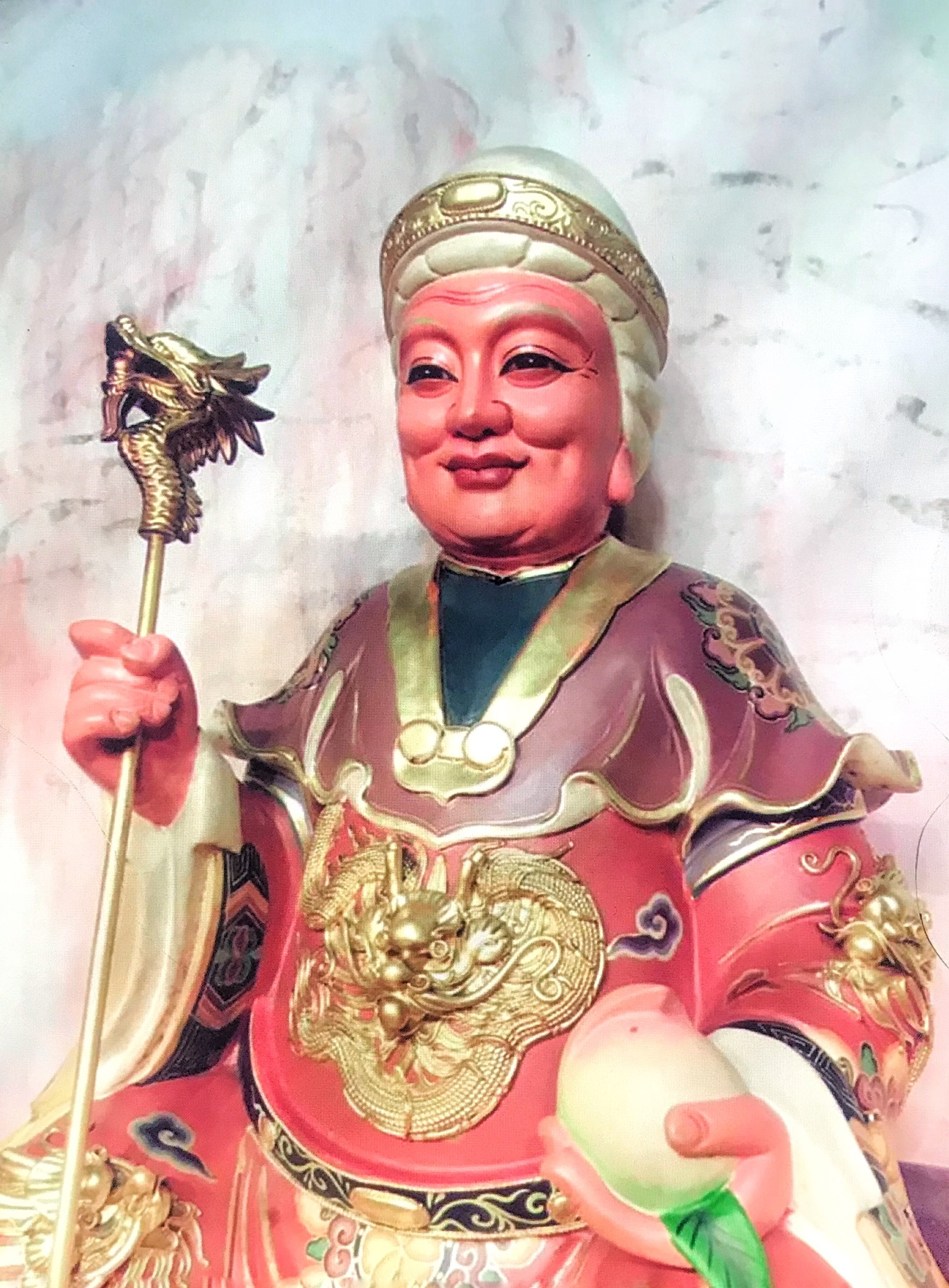
Statue of Lishan Laomu

A local myth collected in Zhongning County, Ningxia Province in 1986 makes Lishan Laomu and Wangmu Niangniang into sisters who collaborated in the task of mending the sky and earth.

Luo Maodeng's popular novel Sanbao taijian xiyang ji states that Lishan Laomu holds a higher status than Sakyamuni Buddha and Jade Emperor. Initially, she had no name due to the absence of writing before the world's creation. However, after giving birth to Pangu, she was referred to as Laomu. And because she resided on Lishan Mountain, she was known as Lishan Laomu. The Taoist classic Lishan Old Mother Xuanmiao Zhenjing records that the Old Mother of Lishan was transformed by Doumu and had a kind and dignified appearance.

According to the Qing dynasty novel History of Female Immortals written by Lu Xiong, Lishan Laomu was considered the ancestor of the earth immortals and held official positions in the heavenly court. It was believed that all women who became earth immortals were related to the old mother of Lishan. Lishan Laomu and other female fairies were guests in Guanghan Palace and seated in the east, while Sunü was seated first in the west.

The Qing dynasty novel Xiuyun Pavilion written by Wei Wenzhong, tells of Lan Xian, Gui Xian, and Ge Xian who fought three battles. Lishan Laomu comes to their rescue when they are faced with the three flower demons, ultimately saving them from disaster.

Her disciples and apprentices include Taoist ascetics such as Li Quan and legendary female heroes, such as Zhongli Chun, Fan Lihua, Bai Suzhen, Zhu Yingtai, Mu Guiying, Liu Jinding, these women are heroine era. The apprentices of Lishan Laomu in literary works include:

- According to records in printed novels from the Qing dynasty, Zhu Yingtai was saved by Lishan Laomu after experiencing a tragic love affair and was subsequently taught a distinctive skill.
- According to legend, Mu Guiying learned the skill of handling flying swords and arrows from Lishan Laomu, which led to her becoming one of the esteemed female generals of the Yang family.
- According to the novel Xue Dingshan Expedition to the West, Lishan Laomu took Fan Lihua as her apprentice during the Zhenguan period and instructed her in the arts of manipulating mountains and seas, as well as bringing beans to life as soldiers. As a result, Fan Lihua became a brave and proficient female marshal.
- In some variations of the Legend of the White Snake, it is stated that Lishan Laomu served as the mentor to Bai Suzhen and Xiaoqing, instructing them in the use of the magic spells of Mount Li.
- The characters Lian Saihua and Lian Xiuying in Sword In Spring And Autumn Lyrics were also disciples of Lishan Laomu.
- In the Qing dynasty novel Five Tigers Conquering the West, it is mentioned that Princess Babao of Northern Liao was a disciple of Lishan Laomu. The princess had a close relationship with the general Di Qing and later succeeded him.
- According to the Huai'an fu zhi (淮安府志), Fan Changzhen was convicted and sentenced after smuggling food to help the poor. However, his good deeds and accumulated virtuous deeds protected him from punishment by both gods and humans. Later, he received instruction from Lishan Laomu and went to practice in Mount Li.

In the Ming dynasty novel The Eunuch Sanbao's Journey to the Western Ocean (Sanbao Taijian Xiyang Ji), Lishan Laomu is referred to as "治世无当老母" ("Wudang Old Mother Who Brings Order to the World"). In chapter 44, the Buddhist monk Bifeng refers to her as Lishan Laomu, while two military commanders subsequently report that the Wudang Old Mother has come to challenge him.

The wording has sometimes been connected with Wudang Shengmu, a disciple of Tongtian Jiaozhu in Investiture of the Gods. However, Investiture of the Gods does not directly identify Wudang Shengmu with Lishan Laomu. In the battle of the Ten Thousand Immortals Array, Wudang Shengmu leaves the formation when it begins to fail, and the novel does not describe her subsequent fate.

The expression "无当母" (Wudang Mother) also occurs in the Taishan Baojuan (巍巍不动太山深根结果宝卷), which lists "诸佛母，藏经母，三教母，无当母" ("Mother of the Buddhas, Mother of the Scriptures, Mother of the Three Teachings, Wudang Mother"). A study of Qing-dynasty popular religion discusses this passage in connection with the relationship between the concepts of "mother" and "ancestor".

=== Journey to the West ===
In Chapter 23 of the Journey to the West, the bodhisattva Guanyin invited Lishan Laomu to assist in testing Tang Sanzang. Guanyin, Manjushri, and Samantabhadra transformed into attractive girls, while Lishan Laomu took on the appearance of an old widow. Along with the beautiful daughters, they tested Tang Sanzang and his disciples. As a result, Tang Seng and his companions followed the precepts, but Zhu Bajie was tempted by the girls.

In another chapter, after Tang Sanzang and his disciples are defeated by the poison tea of the Hundred-Eyed Demon Lord, Lishan Laomu disguises herself as a mourning woman and holds her husband's funeral. When Sun Wukong encountered her, she instructed him to go to the Thousand Flowers Cave in Ziyun Mountain and invite the bodhisattva Pilanpo to subdue the monster. After giving her instructions, the woman vanished, and Lishan Laomu appeared in the sky, explaining that she had just returned from the Longhua meeting and she saw that Tang Seng was in trouble. She said that is why she had disguised herself as a mourning woman to help Sun Wukong.

The old zaju or operatic version text of The Journey to the West (Note: Conventionally referred to as "The Journey to the West as zaju".) styles the Lishan Laomu as the elder sister of the protagonist, the Monkey King Sun Wukong. The zaju version is made confusing because the title Qitian Dasheng (斉天大聖, 'Great Sage Equal to Heaven') which normally refers to Sun Wukong himself (Note: As is the case in the book version of the Journey to the West, and the enshrining conventions and practices of the Taoist Chinese folk religion.) is conferred to a supposed elder brother of his; meanwhile Sun Wukong adopts the slightly different title of Tongtian Dasheng (通天大聖, 'Great Sage Reaching Heaven'). (Note: Also, Sun Wukong is also alternatively referred to as Sun Xingzhe (孫行者, 'the acolyte/ascetic').)

While the text of the romance version of the Journey to the West mentions the concept of the Immortals of the Upper Eight Caves, it only names divinities other than Li Shan Laomu, (Note: The Three Pure Ones, Four Sovereigns (sidi, 四帝), and the Heavenly Devas of the taiyi (taiyi tianxian, 太乙天仙) and others.) however, some baojuan scrolls dating to the Qing dynasty period do name her among the "Eight Upper Immortals" (cf. Divine Immortals of the Eight Grottoes, or Eight Immortals of the Upper, Middle, and Lower spheres). (Note: The He Xiangu baojuan (《何仙姑宝巻》, 'The Precious Scroll of the Immortal Maiden He') names Lishan Laomu (驪山老母) and the Baxian [da] shangshou baojuan (《八仙[大]上寿宝巻》, 'on the Eight Immortals' Birthday Congratulations') names Lishan Laomu (黎山老母), but the other divinities listed as the Eight Immortals or the Upper differ completely.)

== Conflations ==
She has often become equated with Nüwa. Certainly there was a place of Nüwa's governance on Mount Li, according to medieval sources. (Note: Lushi citing Chang'an zhi as stating "Li shan has Nüwa's place of governance 驪山有女媧治處". Noted by scholar Lü Simian (d. 1907).)

She has also been conflated with Wuji Laomu (無極老母, 'Old Mother of the Ultimate Nothingness').

== Temple ==
Temples dedicated to Lishan Laomu can be found in various locations, with the Lishan Laomu Palace in Xi'an, Shaanxi Province being the most famous among them. The palace is situated on the Xixiu Ridge of Lishan Mountain in the Lintong District of Xi'an.

Some temples dedicated to Lishan Laomu in Taiwan are:

- Wuji Mother Palace (無極慈母宮), Shenkeng District, New Taipei City
- Ciyuan Palace Mother Hall (慈元宮母), Heping District, Taichung City
- Lingshan Mother Palace (靈山慈母宮), Ren'ai Township, Nantou County
- Lishan Laomu Palace (驪山老母宮), Nanhua District, Tainan City
- Lishan Laomu Cihui Hall, (慈惠堂黎山老母), Xinhua District, Tainan City
- Wuji Mercy Cloud Palace (無極慈雲宮), Ji'an Township, Hualien County
- Xuanmiao Palace (玄妙宮), Xizhi District, New Taipei City

== In popular culture ==
- Portrayed by Sun Fengqin in 1986 Chinese television series Journey to the West
- Portrayed by Suet Nei in 2004 Hong Kong television series Lady Fan
- Portrayed by Wang Ruihong in 2011 Chinese television series Journey to the West
- Portrayed by Angie Chiu in 2018 Chinese television series The Destiny of White Snake

== See also ==
- Nüwa
- Wusheng Laomu
- Doumu
- Xiwangmu
- Jiutian Xuannü
- Houtu
