= Hugh Thompson Reid =

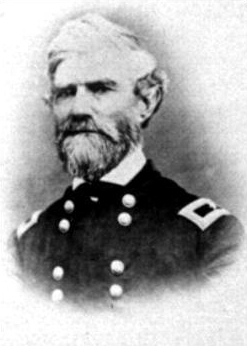
- Born: October 18, 1811; Union City, Indiana, US
- Died: August 28, 1874 (aged 62); Keokuk, Iowa, US
- Burial place: Oakland Cemetery, Keokuk, Iowa
- Military career
- Allegiance: United States; Union
- Branch: United States Army; Union Army
- Rank: Brigadier General, U.S.V.
- Conflicts: American Civil War: Battle of Shiloh; Battle of Lake Providence; Vicksburg Campaign
- Other work: Lawyer

Hugh Thompson Reid (1811–1874) was a lawyer, president of the Des Moines Valley Railroad and Union general during the American Civil War.

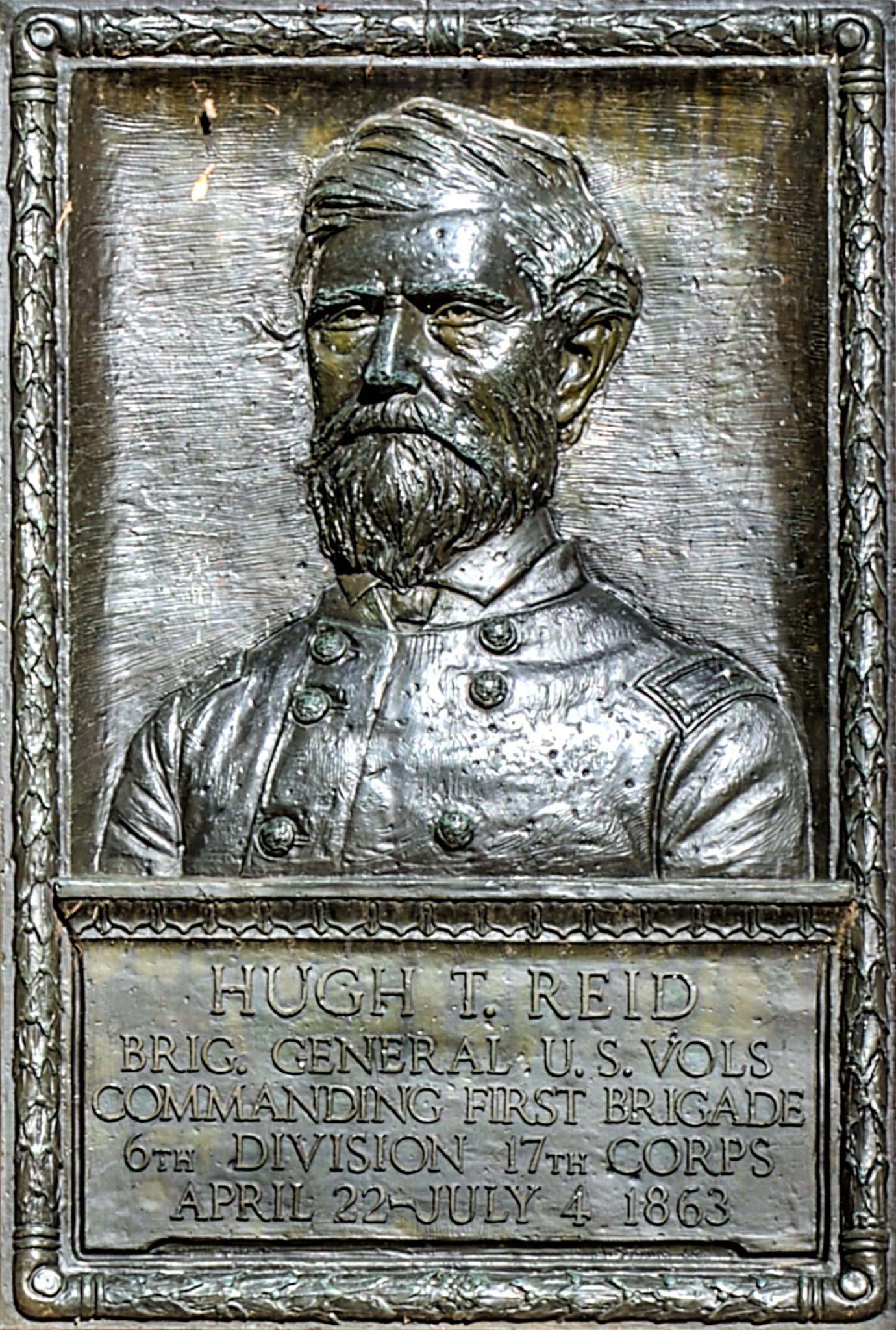
Bronze relief portrait of Reid at Vicksburg National Military Park

== Early life ==
Reid was born in Indiana on October 18, 1811, to James and Ann Thompson Reid. He attended Miami University and Indiana University, becoming a lawyer. In 1839 he moved to Iowa to continue his law practice. During the 1840s he purchased large tracts of land becoming the most extensive land owner in Iowa at the time. He also became the president of the Des Moines Valley Railroad.

== Civil War ==
On February 22, 1862, Reid was appointed colonel of the 15th Iowa Volunteer Infantry Regiment for service in the Union Army during the Civil War. Colonel Reid and the 15th Iowa first saw combat at the Battle of Shiloh. Because his regiment arrived on the field of battle once the fighting had already begun it was rushed to the thickest of the fight and was attached to Benjamin M. Prentiss' division fighting around the Hornet's Nest. During the fighting Reid was severely wounded in the neck and was presumed dead. His body was recovered and brought to the rear where he soon regained enough consciousness to rejoin the fighting. Reid was out of action for a time following the battle but fully recovered despite the Chicago Tribune running an article stating he had been paralyzed. Reid returned to command a brigade in the Army of the Tennessee stationed around Corinth, Mississippi.

General Ulysses S. Grant noticed Reid's gallantry at Shiloh and recommended him for promotion. Reid was promoted to brigadier general of U.S. volunteers on March 13, 1863. General Reid was now assigned to command the 1st Brigade, 6th Division, XVII Corps headquartered near Lake Providence, Louisiana. This brigade was a mix of white regiments and African American regiments. Reid was quoted saying "every colored soldier who stops a rebel bullet saves a white man’s life". During the siege of Vicksburg, Reid's brigade operated on the Louisiana side of the Mississippi River, fighting skirmishes at Lake Providence and Goodrich's Landing during the month of June. After Vicksburg fell to the Union army, Reid was transferred to command the District of Cairo in southern Illinois.

== Later life ==
On April 14, 1864, Reid resigned from the army and returned to Iowa. There he resumed his law practice and served again as president of the Des Moines Valley Railroad. Reid died of bright's disease on August 28, 1874, and is buried in Keokuk, Iowa.
