= Li Quan (Taoist) =

Li Quan (Chinese: 李筌; 618 — 907), also known as Daguanzi (Chinese: 達觀子; lit. 'Master of Penetrating Observation'), was a Tang dynasty Taoist, hermit and former military governor. He fond of the way of the immortals who often travelled to spiritual places in the mountains.

== Political career ==
Li Quan was a native of Longxi (in present-day Gansu) in Tang dynasty. He served in several official positions during the Kaiyuan reign period (713-41), first as deputy commander of a regional defense force in the south, then as a Vice Censor-in-Chief (Yushi Zhongcheng) at the capital, and finally as a Prefect (cishi) of a prefecture in Hebei. His career in government came to an end when he offended the dictatorial chief minister Li Linfu (?-752) who demoted him. Thereafter, he forsook government service, took up the life of a Taoist recluse and roamed among the holy mountains of China.

== As a Taoist ==
He came to a cave dwelling at the Tiger Mouth Cliff on Mount Song where he found the scripture Huangdi Yinfujing (The Yellow Emperor's Scripture on "Unconscious Unification"). He copied the several thousand new chapters without understanding their meaning. Years thereafter, he came across Mount Li where he encountered Lishan Laomu. Lishan Laomu explained to Li Quan the meaning of the Yinfujing. He made annotations on this classic and published it so as to enrich the theories of Taoist medicine. He also transcribed the text and published it with his commentary Yinfujing Jie (陰符經解). The text was passed on to other hermits on Mount Shaoshi and was eventually collected in the Taoist canon. He later wrote the military treatise Taibai Yin jing (the Scripture of Venus and Yin, 太白陰經), about checking the enemy by divine surprise which contains the oldest known depiction and description of the volley fire technique. It was said that he disappeared among the mist and clouds of Mount Shaoshi and was never seen again. (Note: Quoted from Jiu tuji (舊圖經, 'old map guides') in Chang'an zhi Book 16.)
