= William Y. Roberts =

William Y. Roberts was a state representative in Pennsylvania adjutant general, lieutenant governor under the Topeka Constitution, and then a colonel in the Union Army from Kansas during the American Civil War. He was a commander of the 1st Regiment Kansas Volunteer Infantry.

William Bigler was a mentor to Roberts. He was a supporter of the Topeka Constitutional Convention that President Franklin Pierce opposed. Roberts warned that Civil War would result of efforts at popular sovereignty were rejected.

In 1856 he and Samuel C. Pomeroy wrote from Willard's Hotel in Washington D.C. to Cyrus K. Holliday in Topeka in efforts to resolve the dispute over Kansas Territory status and whether it would become a free or slave state. They noted legislative efforts and involvement from United States President Franklin Pierce.

Roberts was a regimental commander during the American Civil War.

== Personal life ==
He was the second husband of Louise Gates.
