= 1st Kansas Infantry Regiment =

- Active: May 20, 1861 – August 30, 1865
- Country: United States
- Allegiance: Union
- Branch: Infantry
- Engagements: Battle of Wilson's Creek; Vicksburg Campaign; Battle of Lake Providence; Battle of Richmond, Louisiana; Battle of Goodrich's Landing; Yazoo City Expedition

The 1st Kansas Infantry Regiment was an infantry regiment that served in the Union Army during the American Civil War. On August 10, 1861, at the Battle of Wilson's Creek, Missouri, the regiment suffered 106 soldiers killed in action or mortally wounded, one of the highest numbers of fatalities suffered by any Union infantry regiment in a single engagement during the American Civil War.

Part of the regiment was formed by soldiers from The Stubbs.

== Service ==
The 1st Kansas Volunteer Infantry Regiment was organized at Camp Lincoln near Leavenworth, Kansas from May 20 to June 30, 1861, the greatest number of men being recruited between May 20 and June 3. It then mustered in for three years' service under the command of Colonel George Washington Deitzler. The regiment moved to Wyandotte County, Kansas, then to Kansas City, Missouri and Clinton, Missouri, to join General Lyon, June 7-July 13, 1861.

- Attached to Dietzler's Brigade, Lyon's Army of the West.
- Attached to Department of Missouri to February 1862.
- Department of Kansas to June 1862.
- District of Columbus, Kentucky, Department of Tennessee, to September 1862.
- 1st Brigade, 6th Division, District of Corinth, Department of Tennessee, to November 1862.
- 1st Brigade, 6th Division, Left Wing, XIII Corps, Department of Tennessee, to December, 1862.
- 1st Brigade, 6th Division, XVI Corps, Army of the Tennessee, to January 1863.
- 1st Brigade, 6th Division, XVII Corps, to July 1863.
- District of Vicksburg, Mississippi, to September 1863.
- 1st Brigade, 1st Division, XVII Corps, to August 1864.
- Unattached, 2nd Division, XIX Corps, Department of the Gulf, to December 1864.
- District of Eastern Arkansas, VII Corps, Department of Arkansas, to January 1865.
- Department Headquarters, Department of Arkansas, to August 1865.
- The 1st Kansas Infantry mustered out of service on August 30, 1865.

== Detailed service ==
Action at Dug Springs, Missouri, August 2. At Springfield, Missouri, until August 7. Battle of Wilson's Creek August 10. March to Rolla, Missouri, August 11–22, then to St. Louis, Missouri, and duty on the Hannibal & St. Joseph Railroad until October. Duty at Tipton, Missouri, guarding the Missouri Pacific Railroad, October 1861 to January 1862. Expedition to Milford, Missouri, December 15–19, 1861. Shawnee Mound, Milford, December 18. At Lexington, Missouri, until February 1862. Moved to Fort Leavenworth, Kansas, in anticipation of General Curtis' New Mexico Expedition April and May. Service with McPherson's Brigade. Ordered to Columbus, Kentucky, and duty guarding Mobile and Ohio Railroad. Headquarters at Trenton, Tennessee, until September. Brownsburg September 4. Trenton, September 17. Moved to Jackson, Tennessee, and duty there until November. March to relief of Corinth, Mississippi, October 3–5. Pursuit to Ripley, Mississippi, October 5–12. Actions at Chewalla, Tennessee, and Big Hill October 5. Moved to Grand Junction, Tennessee, November 2. Operations on the Mississippi Central Railroad to the Yocknapatalfa River November 1862 to January 1863. Service in Vicksburg Campaign and Grant's Central Mississippi Campaign. Moved to Moscow, Tennessee, then to Memphis, Tennessee, and to Young's Point, Louisiana, January 17, 1863. Regiment mounted February 1, 1863. Moved to Lake Providence, Louisiana, February 8, and provost duty there until July. Actions at Old River, Hood's Lane, Black Bayou, Mississippi, and near Lake Providence February 10. Pin Hook and Caledonia, Bayou Macon, May 10. Expedition to Mechanicsburg May 26-June 4. Repulse of attack on Providence in Battle of Lake Providence June 9. Baxter's Bayou and Lake Providence June 10. Bayou Macon June 10. Battle of Richmond, Louisiana, June 15, 1863. Richmond, Louisiana, June 16. Battle of Goodrich's Landing near Lake Providence June 29. Moved to Natchez, Mississippi, July 12–13, and duty there until October. Expedition to Harrisonburg, Louisiana, September 1–8. Cross Bayou September 14. Moved to Vicksburg, Mississippi, October, and duty at Big Black River and near Haynes' Bluff until June, 1864. Skirmish at Big Black River, October 8, 1863. Scout from Bovina Station to Baldwyn's Ferry November 1. Scout to Baldwyn's Ferry January 14, 1864. Expedition up Yazoo River April 19–23. McArthur's Yazoo City Expedition to Yazoo City, Mississippi, May 4–21. Benton, Mississippi, May 7–9. Luce's Plantation May 13. Ordered to Fort Leavenworth, Kansas, June 1, 1864. Attacked on riverboat W. R. Arthur near Columbia, Arkansas, June 2. Mustered out June 19, 1864. Additional Service by veteran volunteer companies. Veterans on duty in District of Vicksburg, Mississippi, until August 1864. Ordered to Morganza, Louisiana, July 29. Operations in vicinity of Morganza September 16–25. Near Alexandria, Louisiana, September 20. Skirmish near the Atchafalaya River October 4, 1864. Atchafalaya October 5. Ordered to White River, Arkansas, October 7, then to Little Rock, Arkansas, December 7. Duty there as Headquarters Guard and escort, Department of Arkansas, until August 1865. Veteran volunteers mustered out August 30, 1865.

== Casualties ==
The regiment lost a total of 252 men during service; 7 officers and 120 enlisted men killed or mortally wounded, 3 officers and 122 enlisted men died of disease.

== Commanders ==
- Colonel George Washington Deitzler
- Colonel William Y. Roberts
- Colonel Oscar Eugene Learnard

== Notable members ==
- Captain Powell Clayton, Company E - Governor of Arkansas (1868–1871); U.S. Senator from Arkansas (1871–1877)
- Captain Daniel McCook, Jr., Company H - brigadier general, mortally wounded at the Battle of Kennesaw Mountain
- Sergeant "Daniel" Mullhatten, Company C - A female serving as a man under an assumed name. Mullhatten enlisted in Company C June 14, 1861 and rose in rank to sergeant until death by disease in July 1863, at Lake Providence, Louisiana. Mullhatten's gender was discovered when the body was being prepared for burial. A witness in the hospital described Mullhatten as, "more than average size for a woman with rather strongly-marked features, so that with the aid of a man's attire she had quite a masculine look."
- 2nd Lieutenant Caleb S. Pratt, Company A - Namesake of Pratt County, Kansas, killed at the Battle of Wilson's Creek
- Captain Lewis Stafford, Company E - Namesake of Stafford County, Kansas, killed at Young's Point, Madison Parish, Louisiana.
- Captain Samuel Walker, Company F - major general in the Kansas Militia (1865-1875); Member of the Kansas State Senate (1872-1874)

== See also ==
- List of Kansas Civil War Units
- Kansas in the Civil War
