= Volley fire =

Concentration of ammunition on a designated target

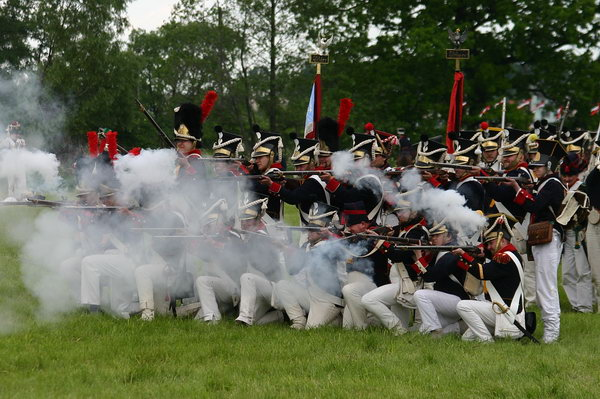
Battle of Raszyn re-enactment, 2006

Volley fire, as a military tactic, is (in its simplest form) the concept of having many soldiers shoot in the same direction at the same time. In practice, it often consists of having a line of soldiers all fire their weapons together at the enemy forces on command, known as "firing a volley", followed by more lines of soldiers repeating the same manoeuvre in turns. This is usually to compensate for the inaccuracy, slow rate of fire (as many early ranged weapons took a long time and much effort to reload), limited effective range and stopping power of individual weapons, which often requires a massed saturation attack to be effective. The volley fire, specifically the musketry volley technique (also known as the countermarch), requires lines of soldiers to step to the front, fire on command and then march back into a column to reload, while the next row repeats the same process.

The term "volley" came from Middle French volée, substantivation of the verb voler, which in turns came from Latin volare, both meaning "to fly", referring to the pre-firearm practice of archers mass-shooting into the air to shower their enemy with arrows. While the tactic of volley fire is usually associated with Dutch military thinkers in the late 16th century, its principles have been applied to crossbow infantry since at least the Chinese Tang dynasty.

== History ==
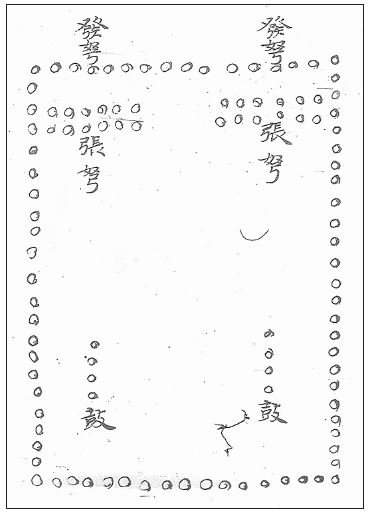
Illustration of a rectangular Tang volley fire countermarch formation using crossbows. From Li Quan 李筌, Shenji Zhidi Taibai Yin Jing 神機制敵太白陰經, ca. 759.

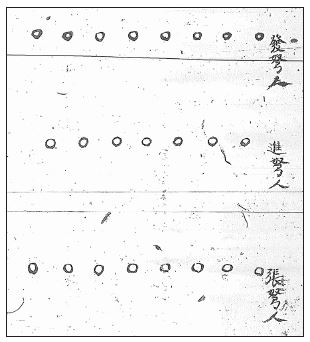
Illustration of a Song crossbow volley fire formation divided into firing, advancing, and reloading lines from top to bottom. From Zeng Gongliang 曾公亮, Complete Essentials for the Military Classics Preceding Volume (Wujing Zongyao qian ji 武經總要前集), ca. 1044 CE.

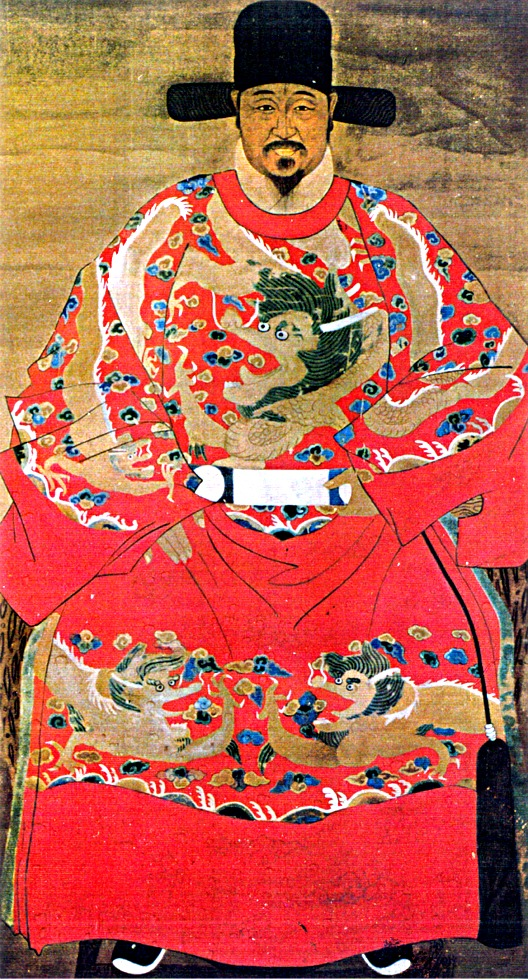
Qi Jiguang (1528–1588)

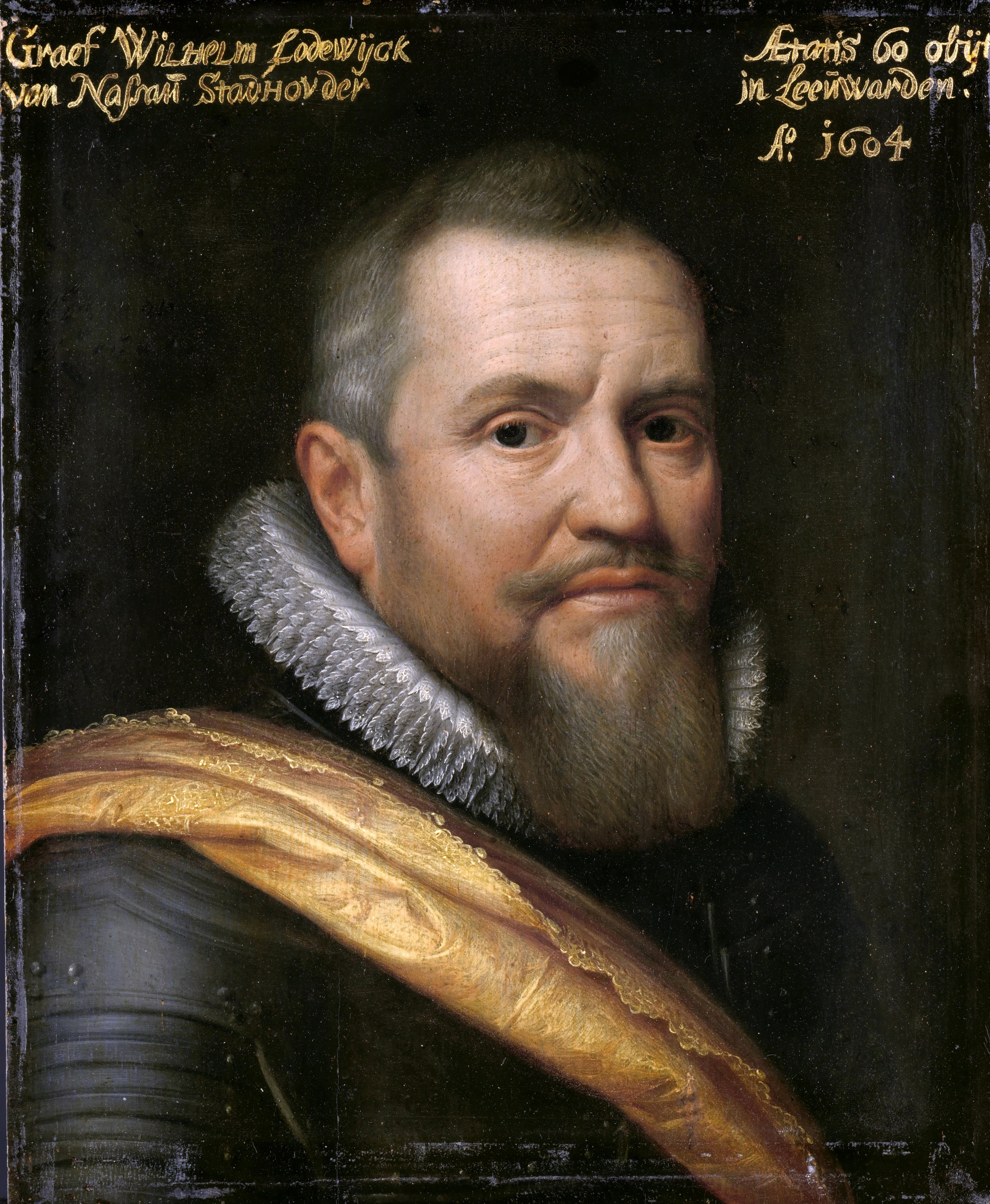
William Louis, Count of Nassau-Dillenburg (1560–1620)

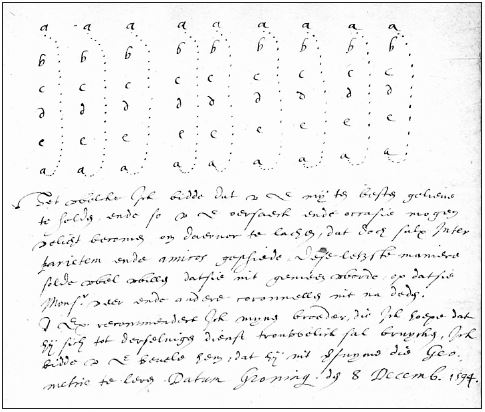
Diagram of a 1594 Dutch musketry volley formation.

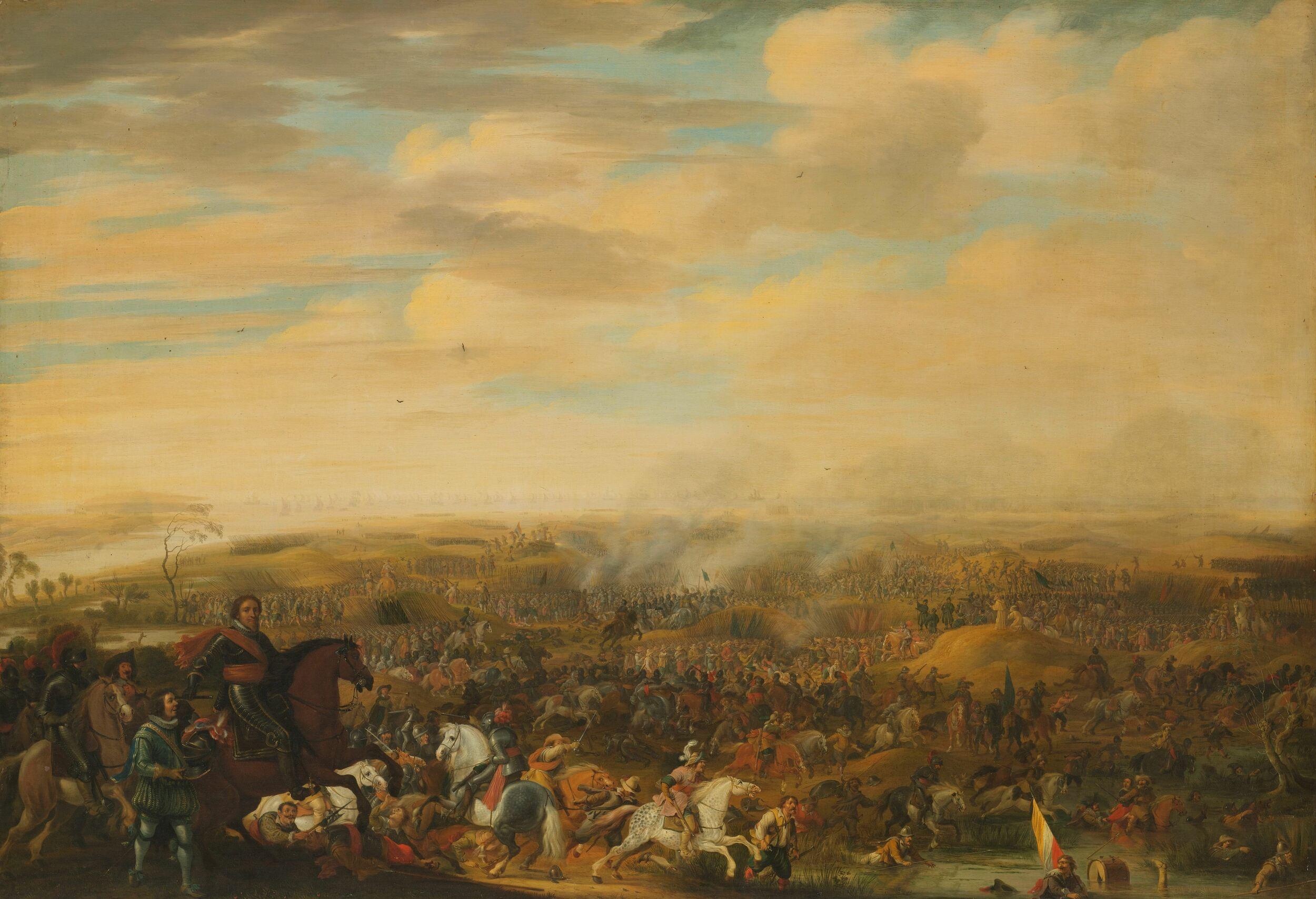
Maurice, Prince of Orange at the Battle of Nieuwpoort, 1600, by Pauwels van Hillegaert (1596–1640).

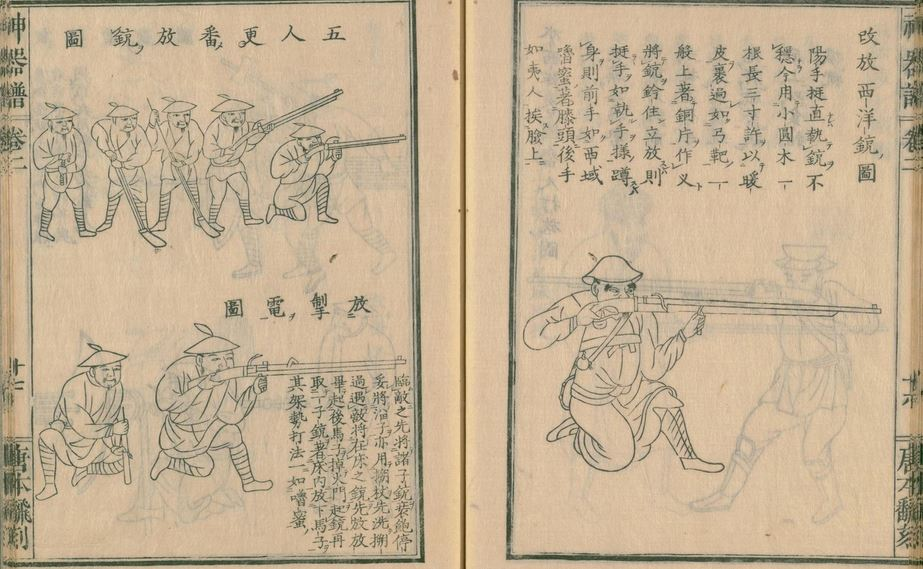
A five man team loading and firing a gun. From the Shenqipu, 1598.

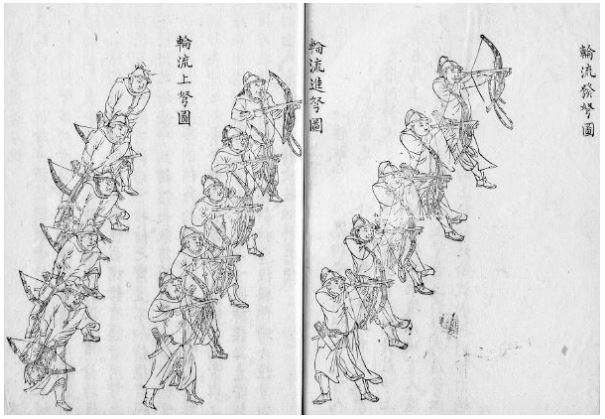
Illustration of a Ming volley fire formation using crossbows. From Cheng Zongyou 程宗猷, Jue zhang xin fa 蹶張心法 ca. 1621.

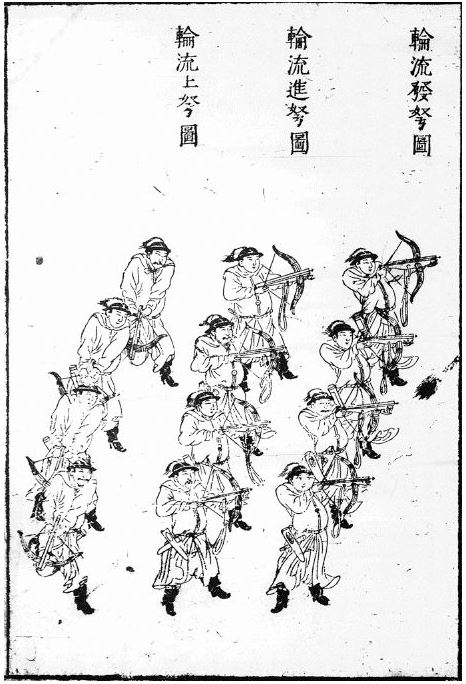
Illustration of another Ming crossbow volley fire formation. From Bi Maokang 畢懋康, Jun qi tu shuo 軍器圖說, ca. 1639.

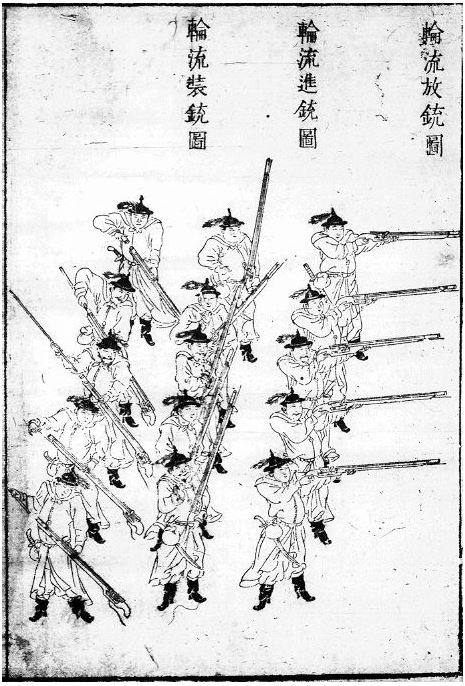
Illustration of a 1639 Ming musketry volley formation. From Bi Maokang 畢懋康, Jun qi tu shuo 軍器圖說, ca. 1639.

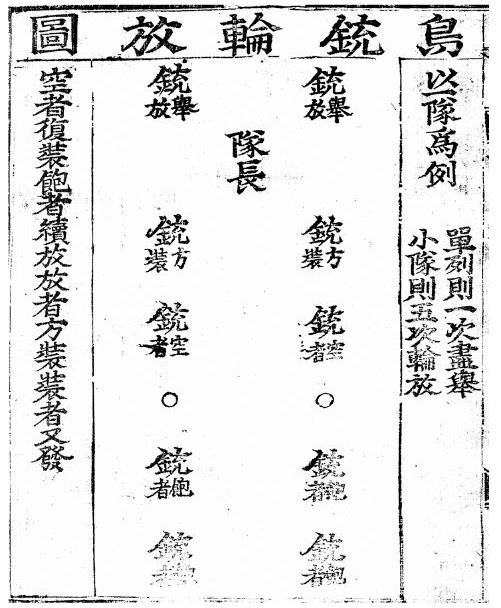
Diagram of a 1649 Korean musketry volley formation.

=== Crossbows ===
Although volley fire is most often associated with firearms, the concept of continuous and concerted rotating fire may have been practiced using crossbows since at least the Han dynasty as described in the Han-Xiongnu Wars in the Book of Han, although it was not until the Tang dynasty that detailed illustrations appeared.

A memorial of 169 BC by Chao Cuo recorded in the Book of Han describes the use of rotating crossbowmen against the Xiongnu: "The use of sharp weapons with long and short handles by disciplined companies of armoured soldiers in various combinations, including the drill of crossbow men alternately advancing [to shoot] and retiring [to load]; this is something which the Huns cannot even face."

During the An Lushan Rebellion the Tang general Li Guangbi successfully deployed a spear crossbow formation against the rebel cavalry forces under Shi Siming. In 756 Shi Siming raced ahead of the main army with his mounted troops to intercept Li Guangbi's Shuofang army near the town of Changshan. Li took Changshan in advance and set up his men with their backs to the town walls to prevent a sneak attack. The spearmen formed a dense defensive formation while 1,000 crossbowmen divided into four sections to provide continuous volley fire. When Shi's cavalry engaged Li's Shuofang army they were completely unable to close in on his troops and suffered heavy losses, forcing a withdrawal.

The 759 AD text, Tai bai yin jing (太白陰經) by Tang military official Li Quan (李筌), contains the oldest known depiction and description of the volley fire technique. The illustration shows a rectangular crossbow countermarch formation with each circle representing one man. In the front is a line labeled "shooting crossbows" (發弩) and behind that line are rows of crossbowmen, two facing right and two facing left, and they are labeled "loading crossbows" (張弩). The commander (大將軍) is situated in the middle of the formation and to his right and left are vertical rows of drummers (鼓) who coordinate the firing and reloading procedure in procession: who loaded their weapons, stepped forward to the outer ranks, shot, and then retired to reload. According to Li Quan, "the classics say that the crossbow is fury. It is said that its noise is so powerful that it sounds like fury, and that's why they named it this way," and by using the volley fire method there is no end to the sound and fury, and the enemy is unable to approach. Here he is referring to the word for "crossbow" nu which is also a homophone for the word for fury, nu.

The encyclopedic text known as the Tongdian by Du You from 801 AD also provides a description of the volley fire technique: "[Crossbow units] should be divided into teams that can concentrate their arrow shooting.… Those in the center of the formations should load [their bows] while those on the outside of the formations should shoot. They take turns, revolving and returning, so that once they've loaded they exit [i.e., proceed to the outer ranks] and once they've shot they enter [i.e., go within the formations]. In this way, the sound of the crossbow will not cease and the enemy will not harm us."

While the virtues of the rotating volley fire were understood during the Tang dynasty, the Wujing Zongyao written during the Song dynasty notes that it was not utilized to its full effectiveness due to their fear of cavalry charges. The author's solution was to drill the soldiers to the point where rather than hide behind shield units upon the approach of melee infantry, they would "plant the feet like a firm mountain, and, unmoving at the front of the battle arrays, shoot thickly to the middle [of the enemy], and none among them will not fall down dead." The Song volley fire formation was described thus: "Those in the center of the formation should load while those on the outside of the formation should shoot, and when [the enemy gets] close, then they should shelter themselves with small shields [literally side shields, 旁牌], each taking turns and returning, so that those who are loading are within the formation. In this way the crossbows will not cease sounding." In addition to the Tang formation, the Song illustration also added a new label to the middle line of crossbowmen between the firing and reloading lines, known as the "advancing crossbows." Both Tang and Song manuals also made aware to the reader that "the accumulated arrows should be shot in a stream, which means that in front of them there must be no standing troops, and across [from them] no horizontal formations."

The volley fire technique was used to great effect by the Song during the Jin-Song Wars. In the fall of 1131 the Jin commander Wuzhu (兀朮) invaded the Shaanxi region but was defeated by general Wu Jie (吳玠) and his younger brother Wu Lin (吳璘). The History of Song elaborates on the battle in detail:

[Wu] Jie ordered his commanders to select their most vigorous bowmen and strongest crossbowmen and to divide them up for alternate shooting by turns (分番迭射). They were called the "Standing-Firm Arrow Teams" (駐隊矢), and they shot continuously without cease, as thick as rain pouring down. The enemy fell back a bit, and then [Wu Jie] attacked with cavalry from the side to cut off the [enemy's] supply routes. [The enemy] crossed the encirclement and retreated, but [Wu Jie] set up ambushes at Shenben and waited. When the Jin troops arrived, [Wu's] ambushers shot, and the many [enemy] were in chaos. The troops were released to attack at night and greatly defeated them. Wuzhu was struck by a flowing arrow and barely escaped with his life.

— History of Song

After losing half his army Wuzhu escaped back to the north, only to invade again in the following year. Again, he was defeated while trying to breach a strategic pass. The History of Song states that during the battle Wu Jie's brother Wu Lin "used the Standing-Firm Arrow Teams, who shot alternately, and the arrows fell like rain, and the dead piled up in layers, but the enemy climbed over them and kept climbing up." This passage is especially noteworthy for its mention of a special technique being utilized as it is one of the very few times that the History of Song has elaborated on a specific tactic.

The crossbow volley fire remained a popular tactic into the Ming dynasty. The martial artist Cheng Chongdou, who studied at the Shaolin Temple, was a particularly avid proponent of the mixed crossbow volley and melee infantry force, which would ideally carry both a wearable crossbow strapped behind the back as well as a personal melee weapon such as the lance or sword. He provides a detailed description of the volley fire technique in a military text ca. 1621:

The ancients used ten thousand crossbows shooting in concert to win victories over enemies, and today I will describe it succinctly. Suppose you have three hundred crossbowmen. The first hundred of them have already loaded their arrows and are already arrayed together in the front. They are labeled "shooting crossbows." The next hundred crossbowmen have also already loaded their arrows, but they are arrayed together in the next row and are labeled "advancing crossbows." Finally, the last hundred men are arrayed behind them, in [the third and] last row. They are loading their crossbows and are labeled "loading crossbows." The first hundred men, which is to say the "shooting crossbows," shoot. After they are done they retire to the rear, at which the second hundred men, the "advancing crossbows," move to the fore and themselves become "shooting crossbows." The rear hundred men, which is to say the "loading crossbows," move forward and become the "advancing crossbows." When the first hundred men have fired and returned to the back, they become "loading crossbows." And in this way they revolve and take turns firing a constant stream, and the crossbows sound without cease.

— Jue zhang xin fa, chang qiang fa xuan, dan dao fa xuan

=== Javelins ===
The Romans deployed a javelin volley tactic. A volley of a Pilum or heavy javelin was thrown before a charge, with the intent of causing casualties and disorder, but also sticking in enemy shields, weighing them down and making them difficult to use. Romans and Greeks also used lighter javelins volleys.

=== Slingshot ===
Ancient Greeks, Romans and Balearic islanders (Spain) used slingshot volleys.

=== Bows ===
The Persians army employed volleys of arrows, slingshots, and javelins against the Greeks in Gaugalema and Thermopylae. Ancient Greeks and Romans used arrow volleys. The goddess Artemis was called "‘of the showering arrows".

In medieval Europe, after the initial volley, archers would fire single shots at individual enemies. Examples include the Battle of Hastings in 1066, Battle of Crécy in 1346 and the Battle of Agincourt in 1415.

=== Firearms ===
==== Early Ming dynasty ====
The earliest possible employment of volley fire for firearms occurred in late 14th century China during a military conflict between Ming and Mong Mao forces. Volley fire was also possibly implemented with firearms in 1414 during the Yongle Emperor's campaigns against the Mongols, and possibly again in another expedition in 1422. However, the language used in these sources is unclear as to whether or not repeating fire was part of the technique implemented. For example, during the 1388 anti-insurrection war waged against the Mong Mao by the Ming general Mu Ying, the Ming troops equipped with guns and fire arrows were arrayed in three lines. The general Mu Ying explained this was so that "when the elephants advance, the front line of guns and arrows will shoot all at once. If they do not retreat, the next line will continue this. If they still do not retreat, then the third line will continue this." When the armored war elephants broke into a run, charging the Ming lines, the Ming forces stood their ground, "shooting arrows and stones, the noise shaking the mountains and vallies. The elephants shook with fear and ran." According to the Ming Shilu, half the elephants were killed while 37 were captured, and of the 100,000 strong insurrection force, at least 30,000 were killed, and 10,000 were captured. Andrade and other historians have interpreted this passage as evidence of volley fire, however he admits that it is ambiguous as to whether or not the Ming lines practiced repeated fire and reloading, so at best it can only be considered a limited form of volley fire.

The Ming Shilu goes on to mention another possible instance of volley fire, this time during the Yongle Emperor's campaigns against the Mongols. In 1414 "the commander-in-chief (都督) Zhu Chong led Lü Guang and others directly to the fore, where they assaulted the enemy by firing firearms and guns continuously and in succession. Countless enemies were killed." In this case the source makes no mention of taking turns or forming lines, but Andrade believes that since the Ming were facing horseback Mongol forces, it would have been impossible to keep continuous fire in the face of a cavalry charge had ordered ranks of gunners not been implemented. The same rationale is applied to another passage on the 1422 expedition, where "the emperor ordered that all the generals train their troops outside each encampment by arranging their formations so that the gunnery units (神機銃) occupied the foremost positions and the cavalry units occupied the rear. He ordered officers to exercise and drill in their free time (暇閑操習). He admonished them as follows: "A formation that is dense is solid, while an advance force is sparse, and when they arrive at the gates of war and it's time to fight, then first use the guns to destroy their advance guard and then use cavalry to rush their solidity. In this way there is nothing to fear."" Some historians have extrapolated from this that the Ming forces were using volley fire with firearms since their opponents were cavalry units, and hence impossible to stop with slow firing hand cannons unless it was through continuous volley fire, much less with a thin advance guard of gunnery units. According to Wang Zhaochun, "the meaning of this is that when fighting, the gun troops line up in front of the entire formation, and between them there must be a certain amount of space, so that they can load bullets and powder and employ shooting by turns and in concert to destroy the enemy advance guard. Once the enemy has been thrown into chaos, the rear densely arrayed cavalry troops together come forth in great vigor, striking forth with irresistible force." Even if Wang is correct, the evidence is still inconclusive.

==== Spain ====
Volley fire might have been used by Gonzalo Fernández de Córdoba at the Battle of Cerignola of 1503, during the early Italian Wars, according to Dario Testi. In a cited chapter of the Crónica del Gran Capitán, Córdoba placed 800 German arquebusiers near the artillery and ordered them to fire in ranks of 200 every time, so they could maintain a continuous stream of gunfire or fuego continuado. Testi also cites the chronicle of Bernal Díaz del Castillo to entertain the idea that Hernán Cortés used alternate ranks of fire with arquebuses and crossbows during the Fall of Tenochtitlan in 1521.

According to Gabor Agoston, the countermarch technique was utilized by Spanish arquebusiers during the Italian Wars in the battles of Battle of Bicocca (1522) and Pavia (1525), which were some of the earliest examples of the countermarch technique. According to González de León citing Charles Oman, at the Battle of Bicocca, commander Fernando d'Ávalos, Marquis of Pescara ordered the arquebusiers to kneel and reload so that the second line of arquebusiers could fire without endangering those in front of them, and so on. The same was done in Pavia, where Pescara's arquebusiers maintained a steady rate of fire. De León states that these victories were made possible through sustained volley fire as well as keen coordination between infantry, cavalry and artillery.

According to Tonio Andrade, the evidence for volley fire in 1522 is meager, and he found no clear evidence that that volley fire was occurring. Andrade says that the belief that Spanish arquebusiers kneeled to reload in 1522 is an over-interpretation as well as mis-citation of a passage by Oman, who never made such a claim. This is contested by Idan Sherer, who quotes Paolo Giovio describing saying that d'Ávalos giving orders for the arquebusiers at Bicocca to kneel, reload and fire by rank until the last line before the front lines fired again.

[Pescara] commanded the first line of arquebusiers that after they discharged their arquebuses they should immediately kneel and reload their guns so that the second line could comfortably fire their guns without any danger to those who stand in front of them. He commanded the second, third and fourth lines to do the same, so that when the last line fired their guns, those of the first and second lines would quickly and expediently rise and fire their loaded guns.

— Giovio, La Vita di Pescara, 48v

It has also been proposed that Spanish conquistador Francisco de Carvajal, also a veteran of the Italian Wars and an understudy to Ávalos, utilized another form of volley fire in 1547, which was instrumental in his victory at the Huarina. Carvajal instructed his 250 arquebusiers to form pairs and fire and reload alternately.

==== Ottoman Empire ====
The volley tactic was possibly used in early 16th century Europe when the Ottoman Janissaries clashed with European forces at the Battle of Mohács on 29 August 1526. The Janissaries equipped with 2000 tüfenks (usually translated as musket) "formed nine consecutive rows and they fired their weapons row by row," in a "kneeling or standing position without the need for additional support or rest." However, the usage of arquebuses in this battle is disputed and they may have been small cannons instead. Whether these tactics anticipated Western European volley fire from the late 16th century requires further examination. However, a description of Janissaries' volley fire from 1605 undoubtedly describes Western European style volley fire. Contrary to the popular belief that the Ottomans' success at Mohács was due to their artillery, a view which many later historians have supported, contemporary European and Ottoman sources on the battle attribute their success to the Janissaries' successful deployment of handheld firearms. According to a German source, 90% of the Janissaries were equipped with handheld firearms while on campaign by 1532.

The Janissaries' prowess declined early in the 17th century as troop standards dropped and the drill was abandoned. According to the author of The Laws of the Janissaries (Kavanin-i Yenigeriyan), by 1606 members of the Janissaries were faced with supply issues so that they "were no longer given powder for the drills and that the soldiers used the wick for their candles and not for their muskets."

==== Japan ====
The musket volley fire technique may have been used in Japan as well as early as 1575 at the Battle of Nagashino by Oda Nobunaga's arquebusiers. But this has been called into dispute in recent years by J.S.A. Elisonas and J.P. Lamers in their translation of The Chronicle of Oda Nobunaga by Ota Gyuichi. In Lamers' Japonius he says that "whether or not Nobunaga actually operated with three rotating ranks cannot be determined on the basis of reliable evidence." They claim that the version of events describing volley fire was written several years after the battle, and an earlier account says to the contrary that guns were fired en masse. Both Korean and Chinese sources note that Japanese gunners made use of volley fire during the Japanese invasions of Korea.

==== Joseon ====
In Korea, the Joseon dynasty underwent a devastating war with newly unified Japan that lasted from 1592 to 1598. The shock of this encounter spurred the court to undergo a process of military strengthening. One of the core elements of military strengthening was to adopt the musket. According to reformers, "In recent times in China they did not have muskets; they first learned about them from the Wokou pirates in Zhejiang Province. Qi Jiguang trained troops in their use for several years until they [muskets] became one of the skills of the Chinese, who subsequently used them to defeat the Japanese." By 1607 Korean musketeers had been trained in the fashion which Qi Jiguang prescribed, and a drill manual had been produced based on the Chinese leader's Jixiao Xinshu. Of the volley fire, the manual says that "every musketeer squad should either divide into two musketeers per layer or one and deliver fire in five volleys or in ten." Another Korean manual produced in 1649 describes a similar process: "When the enemy approaches to within a hundred paces, a signal gun is fired and a conch is blown, at which the soldiers stand. Then a gong is sounded, the conch stops blowing, and the heavenly swan [a double-reed horn] is sounded, at which the musketeers fire in concert, either all at once or in five volleys (齊放一次盡擧或分五擧)." This training method proved to be quite formidable in the 1619 Battle of Sarhu when 10,000 Korean musketeers managed to kill many Manchus before their allies surrendered. While Korea went on to lose both wars against the Manchu invasions of 1627 and 1636, their musketeers were well respected by Manchu leaders. It was the first Qing emperor Hong Taiji who wrote: "The Koreans are incapable on horseback but do not transgress the principles of the military arts. They excel at infantry fighting, especially in musketeer tactics."

=== Countermarch with firearms ===
==== Qi Jiguang ====
By 1548 the Ming had started fielding arquebuses after procuring knowledge of the weapon from the pirate network at Shuangyu. The military leader Qi Jiguang, who was at first ambivalent towards matchlocks, became one of the primary advocates for their incorporation into the Ming army later on in his life. After having suffered his first defeats at the hands of the wokou, he realized the vital role of this new weapon in combating piracy, for it out ranged their heaviest arrows. By 1560 he had invented a style of musket warfare similar to the Tang crossbow volley technique (countermarch) which he described the same year in his magnum opus, the Jixiao Xinshu:

All the musketeers, when they get near the enemy are not allowed to fire early, and they're not allowed to just fire everything off in one go, [because] whenever the enemy then approaches close, there won't be enough time to load the guns (銃裝不及), and frequently this mismanagement costs the lives of many people. Thus, whenever the enemy gets to within a hundred paces' distance, they [the musketeers] are to wait until they hear a blast on the bamboo flute, at which they deploy themselves in front of the troops, with each platoon (哨) putting in front one team (隊). They [the musketeer team members] wait until they hear their own leader fire a shot, and only then are they allowed to give fire. Each time the trumpet gives a blast, they fire one time, spread out in battle array according to the drilling patterns. If the trumpet keeps blasting without stopping, then they are allowed to fire all together until their fire is exhausted, and it's not necessary [in this case] to divide into layers.

— Jixiao Xinshu (18-chapter edition, 1560)

Illustrations from the Jun qi tu shuo of 1639 show nearly identical images of crossbowmen and arquebusiers performing the Chinese countermarch technique.

Qi Jiguang further elaborates on the five layered musket volley formation:

Once the enemy has approached to within 100-paces, listen for one's own commander (總) to fire once, and then each time a horn is blown the arquebusiers fire one layer. One after another, five horn tones, and five layers fire. Once this is done, listen for the tap of a drum, at which then one platoon (哨) [armed with traditional weapons] comes forward, proceeding to in front of the arquebusiers. They [the platoon members] then listen for a beat of the drum, and then the blowing of the swan-call horn, and they then give a war cry and go forth and give battle.

— Jixiao Xinshu (18-chapter edition, 1560)

If melee weapons could not be brought into combat, such as during long range defense, Qi recommended waiting "until the face-the-enemy signal [is given], and then, whether from behind wooden stockades, or from moat banks, or from below abatis (拒馬), [they] open up on the enemy, firing by turns (更番射賊). Those who are empty reload; those who are full fire again. While the ones who have fired are loading, those who are full then fire again. In this way, all day long, the firing of guns will not be lacking, and there must be no firing to the point of exhaustion [of ammo] and no slipups with guns." In 1571 Qi prescribed an ideal infantry regiment of 1080 arquebusiers out of 2700 men, or 40 percent of the infantry force. However it is not known how well this was actually implemented, and there is evidence that Qi was met with stiff resistance to the incorporation of newer gunpowder weapons in northern China while he was stationed there. He writes that "in the north soldiers are stupid and impatient, to the point that they cannot see the strength of the musket, and they insist on holding tight to their fast lances (a type of fire lance), and although when comparing and vying on the practice field the musket can hit the bullseye ten times better than the fast-lance and five times better than the bow and arrow, they refuse to be convinced."

==== Europe ====
European gunners might have implemented the countermarch to some extent since at least 1579 when the Englishman Thomas Digges suggested that musketeers should, "after the old Romane manner make three or four several fronts, with convenient spaces for the first to retire and unite himself with the second, and both these if occasion so require, with the third; the shot [musketeers] having their convenient lanes continually during the fight to discharge their peces."

The Spanish displayed awareness of the countermarch and described it in Martín de Eguiluz's military manual, Milicia, Discurso y Regla Militar, dating to 1586:

"Start with three files of five soldiers each, separated one from the other by fifteen paces, and they should comport themselves not with fury but with calm skillfulness [con reposo diestramente] such that when the first file has finished shooting they make space for the next (which is coming up to shoot) without turning face, countermarching [contrapassando] to the left but showing the enemy only the side of their bodies, which is the narrowest of the body, and [taking their place at the rear] about one to three steps behind, with five or six pellets in their mouths, and two lighted matchlock fuses … and they load [their pieces] promptly … and return to shoot when it's their turn again."

The manual shows the countermarch described as a standard practice, making it clear that the concept of volley fire had existed in Europe for quite some time during the 16th century. However scholars often attribute its innovation to the Dutch army in 1594. It was in the Netherlands during the 1590s that the musketry volley really took off and spread throughout Europe. The key to this development was William Louis, Count of Nassau-Dillenburg who in 1594 described the technique in a letter to his cousin Maurice:

I have discovered … a method of getting the musketeers and soldiers armed with arquebuses not only to keep firing very well but to do it effectively in battle order … in the following manner: as soon as the first rank has fired together, then by the drill [they have learned] they will march to the back. The second rank, either marching forward or standing still, [will next] fire together [and] then march to the back. After that, the third and following ranks will do the same. Thus before the last ranks have fired, the first will have reloaded.

— Letter from Louis to Maurice

The countermarch technique did not immediately change the nature of warfare in Europe and it would take another century of tactical and technological advancements before firearm wielding infantry could stand alone on the battlefield without the support of pikes.

== Historical techniques ==
=== Drilling ===
For many Europeans, this new way of conducting warfare seemed ridiculous, so that in the beginning they were openly mocked. But the Dutch army continued to drill the volley under both Louis and his cousin Maurice, Prince of Orange, so that it became second nature. One Dutch historian recounts the exercises in which regiments marched "man by man bringing the rearmost to the front and the frontmost to the rear.… The beginnings were very difficult, and many people felt, because it was all so unusual, that it was odd and ridiculous [lacherlich]. They were mocked by the enemy, but with time the great advantages of the practices became clear … and eventually they were copied by other nations." Soon the reorganized Dutch army displayed the virtues of the countermarch volley and the practice spread across Europe. An important component to the successful deployment of volley fire was the drill, which according to Geoffrey Parker, "only two civilisation have invented drill for their infantry: China and Europe. Moreover, both of them did so twice: in the fifth century BC in North China and in Greece, and again in the late sixteenth century. Exponents of the second phase— Qi Jiguang in Imperial China and Maurice of Nassau in the Dutch Republic—explicitly sought to revive classical precedents, and in the West, marching in step and standing on parade became a permanent part of military life." Drill was difficult and the manner in which the volley fire should be executed had not been perfected in Louis' time. It is clear from Holland's historical sources that it took many trials and experiments for the process to be refined.

Indeed, just using the musket itself was considered unorthodox and in some parts of the world there was even a push back against the incorporation of muskets. According to Qi Jiguang, this was because:

The musket was originally considered a powerful weapon, and in attacking the enemy is one that has been much relied upon. But how is it that so many officers and soldiers don't think it can be relied upon heavily? The answer lies in the fact that in drills and on the battlefield, when all the men fire at once, the smoke and fire settle over the field like miasmal clouds, and not a single eye can see, and not a single hand can signal. Not all [soldiers] hold their guns level, or they don't hold them to the side of their cheek, or they don't use the sights, or they let their hands droop and support it to hold it up, and one hand holds the gun and one hand uses the fuse to touch off the fire, thus failing to use the matchlock grip— what of them? It's just a case of being out of practice and uncourageous, hurrying but not being able to take out the fire fuse and place it in the matchlock grip, trying for speed and convenience. In this way, there is absolutely no way to be accurate, and so how could one value muskets? Especially given that the name of the weapon is "bird-gun," which comes from the way that it can hit a flying bird, hitting accurately many times. But in this way, fighting forth, the power doesn't go the way one intends, and one doesn't know which way it goes— so how can one hit the enemy, to say nothing of being able to hit a bird?

— Jixiao Xinshu

=== 18th century ===
In the European armies, there were several volley fire techniques for the effective use of a huge mass of muskets at a distance of 100–300 meters. Some of the more common methods seen during the period were firing by rank, firing at will and platoon firing. The effectiveness of volley fire in terms of accuracy has been a long-debated topic even during the early 17th and 18th century, with studies conducted using muskets and rifles of the time indicating that while an individual's accuracy with a musket was relatively effective (~60%) around 50-100 meters, accuracy steadily decreased as the ranges of targets increased, reaching around a 20% hit rate at the 250 meter mark. Coupled with additional stressors on the battlefield like smoke and chaos, the use of volley fire was often for efficiency and consistent rate of effective fire rather than accuracy.

Volley fire was also viewed in most European armies as a method of delivering aggressive firepower in high volumes in a short span of time. The idea that volley fire and musketry would play a central role in an effective force began to slowly take hold and evolve as armies grew more familiar with their use on the field. Even armies that emphasized the importance of close-quarter combat and 'cold steel' slowly began to integrate volley firing and musketry drills into their line units by the mid-1700s.

For more accurate and deadly fire, light infantry companies and regiments were created in all armies. These soldiers had much better training and were able to conduct effective fire with single shots, rather than massive volleys. Light infantry covers the line infantry from the fire of enemy skirmishers, while the line infantry concentrates massive fire along the infantry line or cavalry of the enemy.

Several different methods were used: in the Swedish army, a battalion would approach the enemy, fire one or several volleys, and then charge the enemy with swords, pikes and (later) bayonets, a style they dubbed "Gå På" (which translates roughly as "Go at them"). The Dutch developed the system of platoon firing, which was perfected by the British during the 18th century: here, the battalion, lined up in three rows, was divided into 24-30 platoons which would fire alternately, thus concentrating their fire. This required intensive training for the soldiers, who had to operate their muskets in close ranks. After the command to make ready was given, the first rank knelt down, whilst the third rank stepped slightly to the right, in order to level their muskets past the men in front of them. The French army had trouble adopting this method and relied for the most part of the 18th century on firing by ranks, in which the first rank fired first, followed by the second, and then the third rank. This method was acknowledged by the French command at the time to be far less effective. The Prussian army, reformed under the "Alte Dessauer", placed much emphasis on firepower. In order to make the men load and fire their muskets quicker, the iron ramrod was developed. Voltaire once commented that the Prussian soldiers could load and fire their muskets seven times in a minute; this is a gross exaggeration, but it is an indication of the drill, which led to platoons firing devastating volleys with clockwork precision. In all, a professional soldier was required to load and fire his musket three times in a minute.

=== 19th and 20th centuries ===
Already in the American Civil War and the Franco-Prussian War, the development of modern weapons had devastating effects on the infantry, which still operated in basically 18th century style. The infantry itself also was equipped with rifles that fired faster and more accurately than the flintlock muskets, such as the French Chassepot and the Prussian needle rifle. It wasn't until World War I however that the linear tactics and volley fire were finally abandoned, after in the first stages of the war, relentless fire from artillery and machine guns had decimated the armies, and the infantry had no option but to dig in and hide in trenches. In modern times the use of volley fire is limited, since automatic weapons can devastate massed infantry on their own without volley fire formations.

Several countries, including Russia, retained the option to use volley fire until the close of the Second World War, as evidenced by all Mosin rifles being fitted with 'volley sights' for 2000m (sometimes 2000 arshin, or 1422.4m in Mosins fitted with the early pattern of sights).

== Depictions ==
Movies often give wrongful depictions of linear tactics and warfare in the early modern period. Volley fire can be seen in many movies such as Pirates of the Caribbean: At World's End. Most accurately, volley fire was depicted in the movie Zulu, a fictionalization of the Battle of Rorke's Drift. To defend a fixed position, British infantry used two-rank volley fire, and later three-rank volley fire, to decimate an attack by a large Zulu force. Despite the Zulus' superior numbers, the attack collapsed under the relentless volley fire they faced.

== See also ==
- Fire for effect
- Marching fire
- Salvo
