= Oscar Eugene Learnard =

American politician

Oscar E. Learnard

Oscar Eugene Learnard (November 14, 1832 – November 6, 1911) was a campaigner for Free State Kansas, a Republican organizer, a colonel in the Union Army during the American Civil War, a railroad official, a two-term Kansas State Senator, and a school administrator.

== Early life and education ==
Learnard was born in Fairfax, Vermont on November 14, 1832, the son of Stephen Tracy and Polly (Dee) Learnard, and was educated at Bakersfield Academy before entering Norwich University in 1852. He later studied at Albany Law School, and was admitted to the bar in 1855. He moved to Ohio in the summer of 1855. During the winter of 1855–1856, he moved to Lawrence, Kansas and joined the effort to have Kansas admitted as a free state.

== Career and military service ==
In 1857, Learnard helped set out the town of Burlington, Kansas and built the first mill, the first business building, and a structure used as a school and church. He served as a member of the council of the first free state legislature from 1857 to 1859. Learnard was judge of the 5th Judicial Circuit after the state government was established. He supported the Free State Movemeent, opposing slavery, and was a local organizer for the Republican Party.

Learnard resigned his judgeship at the beginning of the Civil War. He enrolled as a lieutenant colonel in the 1st Kansas regiment and served until he resigned his commission in 1863. He participated in Price's Raid of Kansas, the Battle of Little Blue River, and at Westport, Missouri in 1864.

After the war, he served in the state senate from 1868 to 1871. He worked for the Kansas City, Fort Scott & Memphis Railroad Company as a tax commissioner and special attorney for a quarter of a century. Learnard became proprietor of the local daily and weekly newspaper, the Lawrence Journal, which he ran beginning in 1884. (Note: Learnard was said to have operated the paper until it was owned by the Journal company, in or before 1911. William Elsey Connelley states in the History of Kansas Newspapers that the Lawrence Journal weekly edition operated from 1886 until 1909 and the daily edition was published until 1911, when it was consolidated with other papers into the Lawrence Daily Journal-World. Learnard was the editor of the paper, which was owned by the Lawrence Journal Company.) Land that he had owned was used in 1889 to establish a native American school called the Haskill Institute, where he was superintendent for a year.

== Personal life ==
On March 2, 1862, he married Mary Sophia Eldridge (1842–1933) in Lawrence; they had six children. His wife survived Quantrill's Raid, also called the Lawrence massacre on August 21, 1863. He died on November 6, 1911. His papers, which provide insight into his political views and other topics, are held at the Kansas Historical Society.
