= Journey to the West (Chinese opera) =

Yuan dynasty zaju (Chinese opera)

- Written by: Yang Jingxian
- Original language: Chinese
- Genre: zaju

Premiere
- Place premiered: China

Journey to the West (西游记) is a Chinese Yuan dynasty zaju (opera) play. It was one of the longest opera works of the Yuan dynasty. The author is generally believed to be the playwright Yang Jingxian who was active during the late Yuan dynasty. The oldest known version of the play was discovered in the Japanese Cabinet Library in 1927. The play consist of twenty-four acts and is one of the sources for Wu Cheng'en's Ming dynasty novel Journey to the West.
