= Kell House =

Kell House may refer to:

- Kell House (Tallulah, Louisiana), listed on the National Register of Historic Places (NRHP)
- Kell House Museum, Wichita Falls, Texas, NRHP-listed in Wichita County
- William H. Kell House, New Richmond, Wisconsin, NRHP-listed in St. Croix County
