= Shirley Field =

Shirley Field may refer to:

- Shirley Anne Field, actress
- Shirley Adele Field, Oregon legislator and judge
- Shirley Field (Tallulah, Louisiana), historic airfield
- Shirley Field, athletic stadium in Laredo, Texas
