= Montrose Plantation House =

Historic house in Louisiana, United States

- U.S. National Register of Historic Places
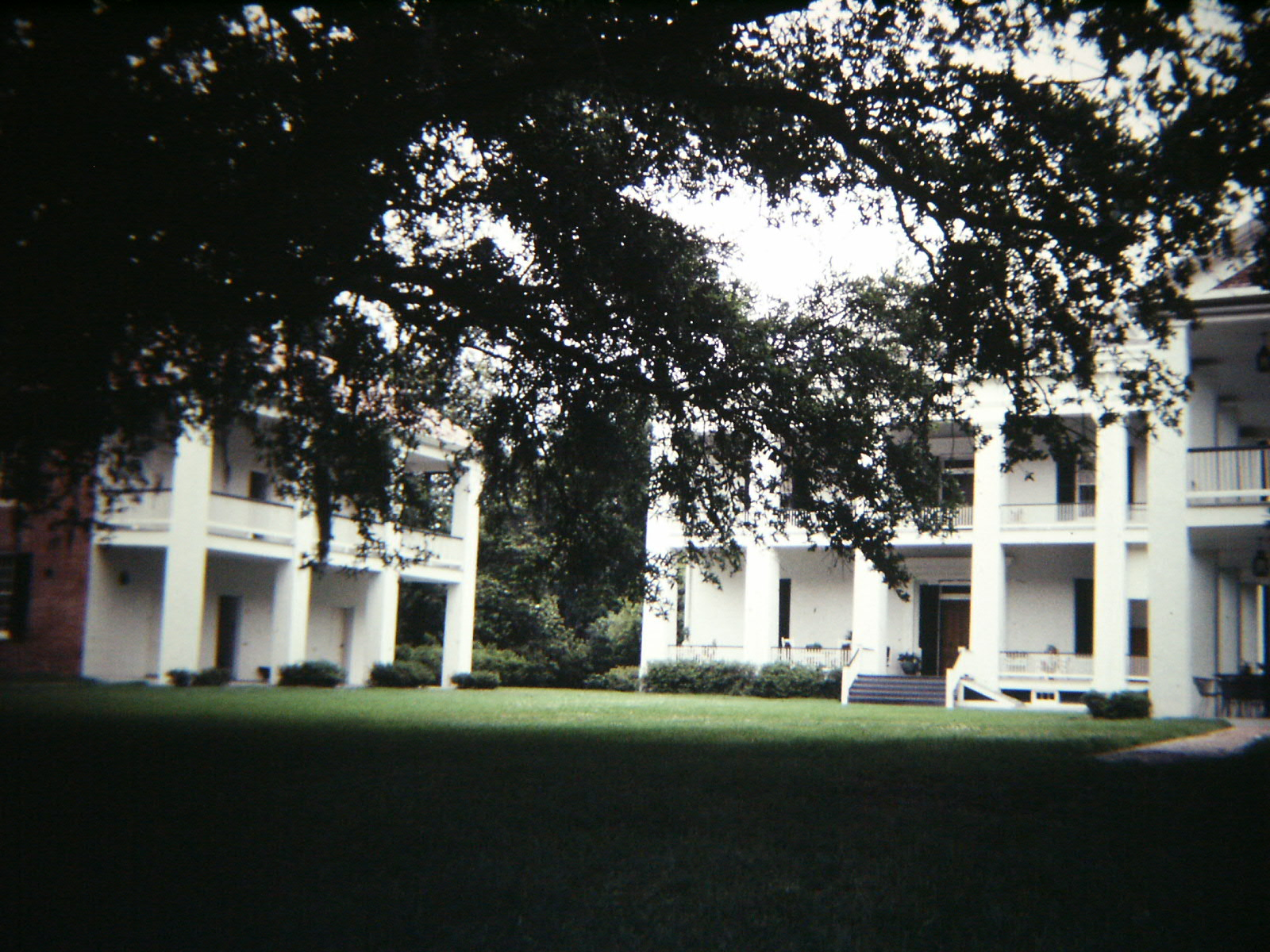

- Location within Louisiana Location within the United States
- Location: Along LA 603, about 6.5 miles (10.5 km) southeast of Tallulah, Louisiana
- Coordinates: 32°19′24″N 91°08′28″W
- Area: 0.5 acres (0.20 ha)
- Built: c.1880
- Architect: George W. Montgomery, Sr.
- Architectural style: Greek Revival
- NRHP reference No.: 82000444
- Added to NRHP: October 5, 1982

Montrose Plantation House is a Greek Revival-style plantation house built in about 1880 which is located in Madison Parish, Louisiana, on Louisiana Highway 603 about 6.5 miles SE of Tallulah. It was added to the National Register of Historic Places on October 5, 1982.

It was deemed "locally significant in the area of architecture because it is a rare surviving example of a Greek Revival plantation house within the context of Madison Parish. Montrose is a relatively late, provincial example of a modest size Greek Revival plantation house. This can be seen in the five-bay gallery with its simple posts and entablature, as well as in the mantels, the plan, the basic form, and the central front doorway."

== See also ==
- List of plantations in Louisiana
- National Register of Historic Places listings in Madison Parish, Louisiana
