= Bear Lake Club, Ltd., Clubhouse =

- Bear Lake Club, Ltd. Clubhouse
- U.S. National Register of Historic Places
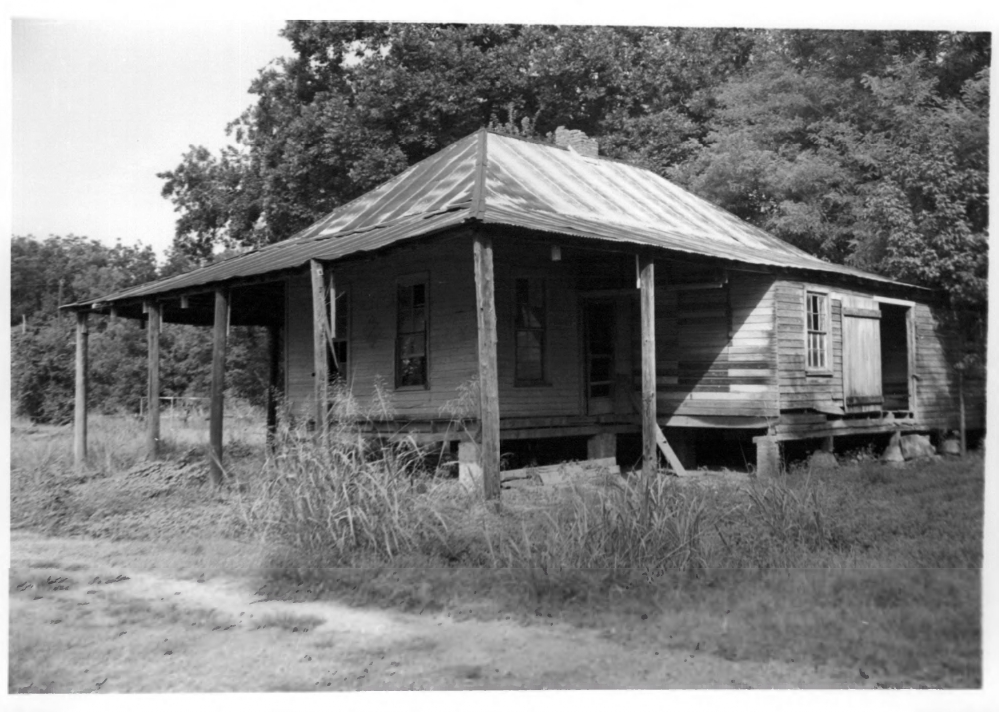

- Location within Louisiana Location within the United States
- Location: Along Bear Lake Road West, about 6.2 miles (10.0 km) northwest of Tallulah, Louisiana
- Coordinates: 32°28′02″N 91°16′03″W
- Area: 0.5 acres (0.20 ha)
- Built: c.1905
- NRHP reference No.: 01000118
- Added to NRHP: March 2, 2001

The Bear Lake Club, Ltd., Clubhouse near Tallulah, Louisiana was built around 1905 and was listed on the National Register of Historic Places on March 2, 2001.

It is located near where Bear Lake enters into Roundaway Bayou. It is much like a simple camp house. The main block of the clubhouse survives, although in 2001 it was deteriorated, with its most distinctive feature being its double-pitched, umbrella-like hipped roof.

== See also ==
- National Register of Historic Places listings in Madison Parish, Louisiana
