= Tallulah Men's Club Building =

- U.S. National Register of Historic Places
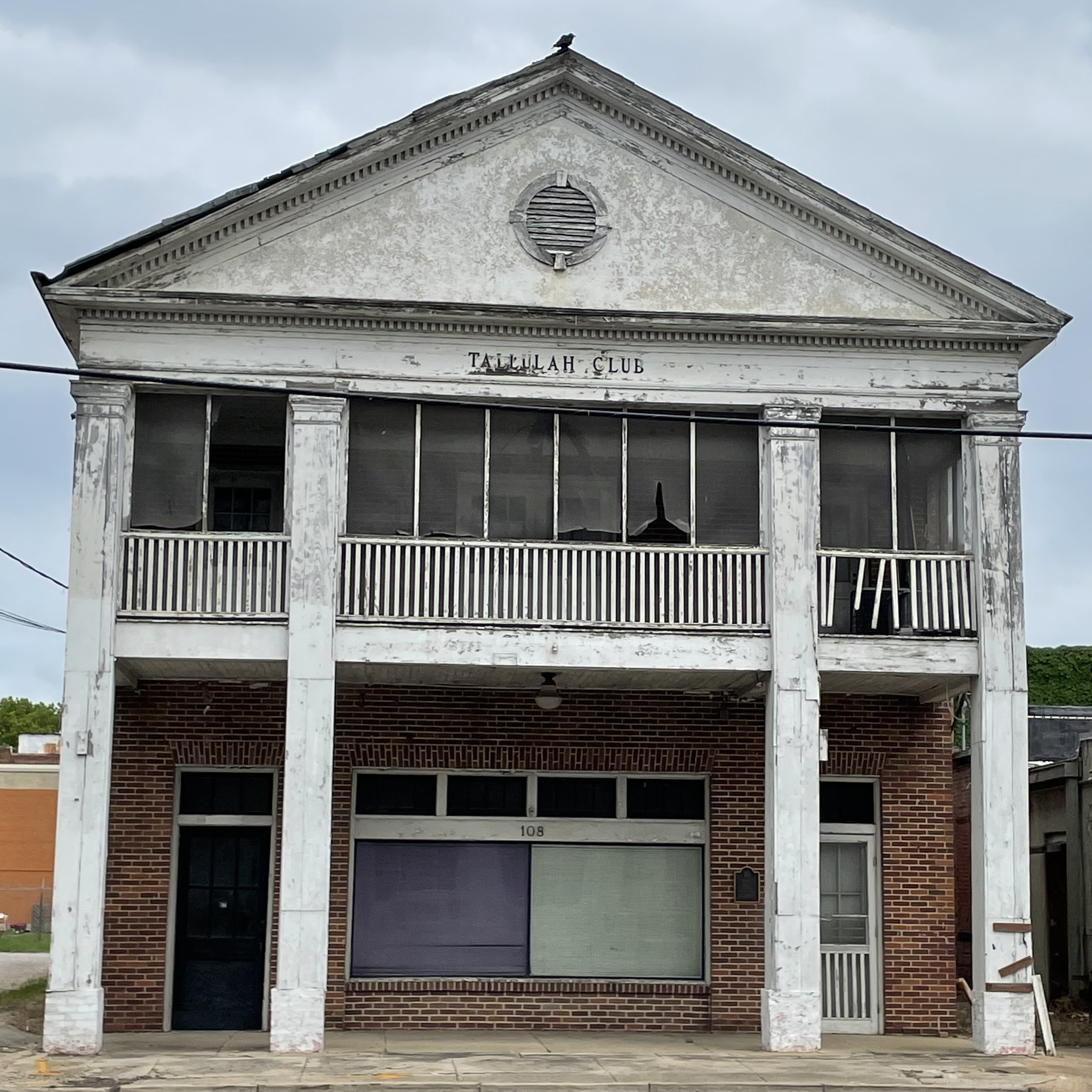

- Location within Louisiana Location within the United States
- Location: 108 North Cedar Street, Tallulah, Louisiana
- Coordinates: 32°24′28″N 91°11′12″W
- Area: less than one acre
- Built: c.1929
- Architectural style: Colonial Revival
- NRHP reference No.: 91001658
- Added to NRHP: November 7, 1991

The Tallulah Men's Club Building, also known as the Tallulah Club, is a two-story brick Colonial Revival building that was built in c.1929. It was listed on the National Register of Historic Places on November 7, 1991.

It has a four-column portico. It is located across from the Madison Parish courthouse.

== See also ==
- Tallulah Book Club Building, NRHP-listed library and women's clubhouse
- National Register of Historic Places listings in Madison Parish, Louisiana
