= Biedenharn Museum and Gardens =

Museum and garden in Louisiana, US

Coordinates: 32.5197°N 92.1312°W

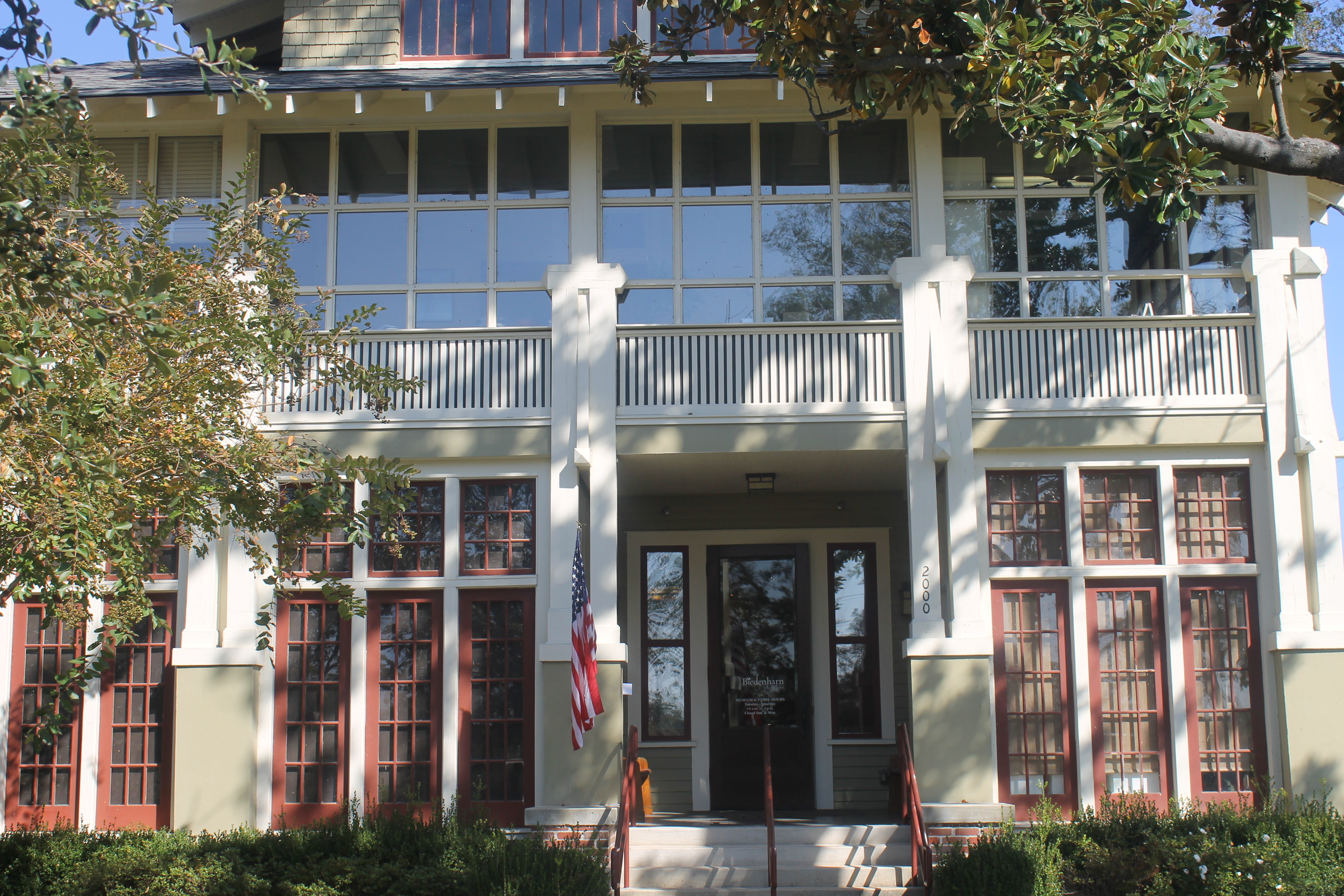
- Entrance to Biedenharn House and Gardens

- Location within Louisiana
- Established: 1913
- Founder: Joseph A. Biedenharn
- Website: www.bmuseum.org

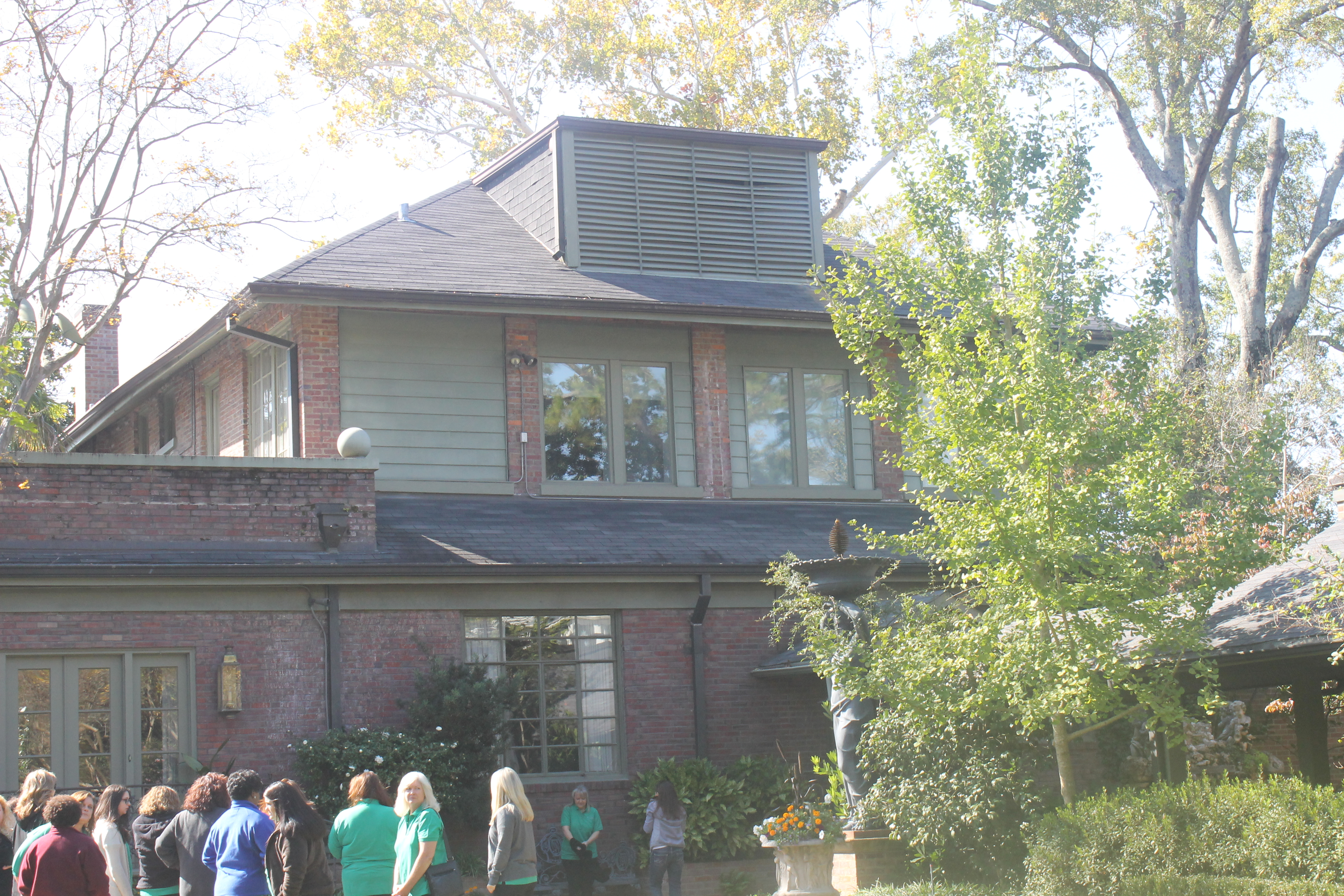
Tourists gather at the rear of the Biedenharn House

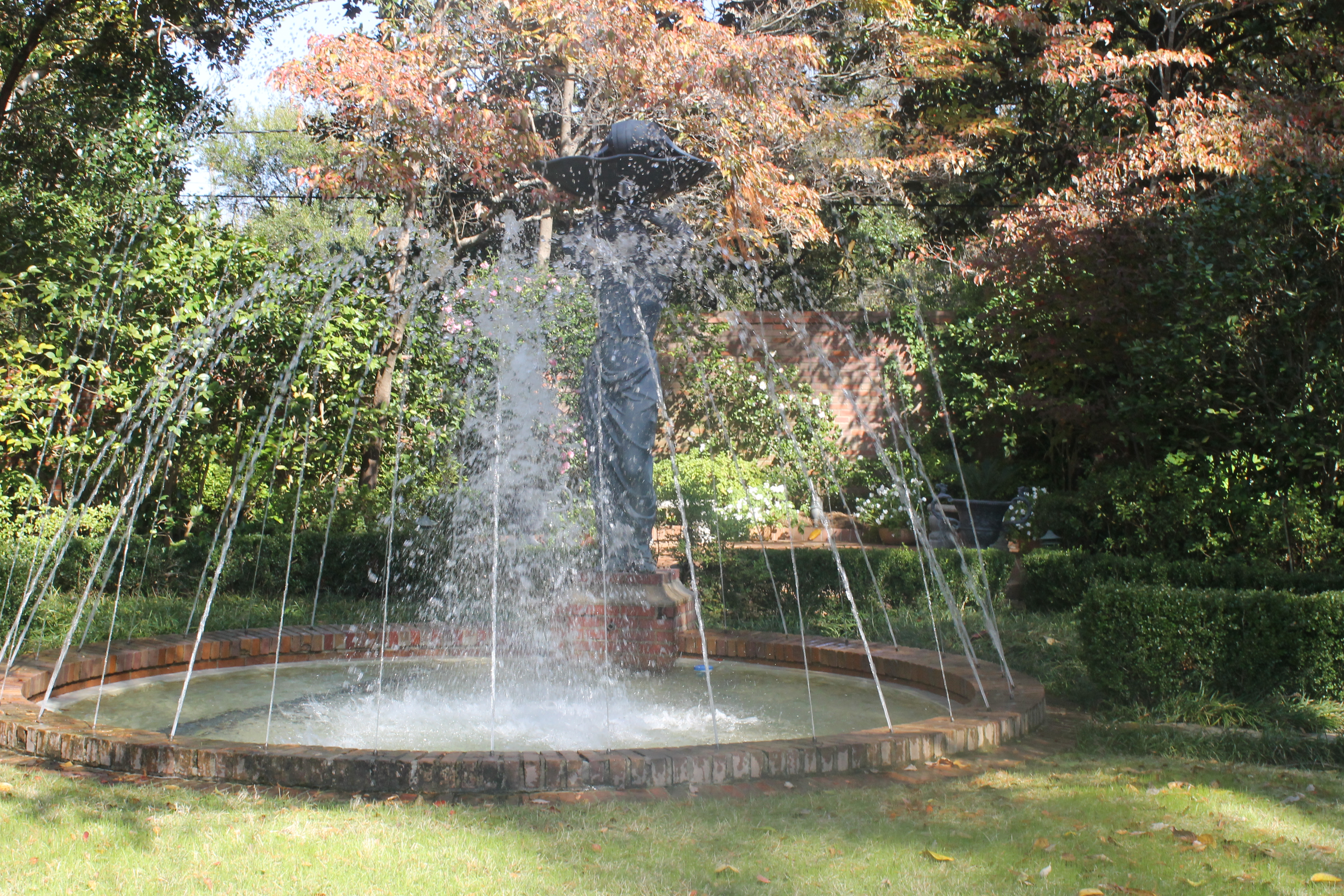
Fountain at the Biedenharn House

The Biedenharn Museum and Gardens is a home museum and botanical garden located beside the Ouachita River at 2006 Riverside Drive in Monroe in Ouachita Parish, Louisiana, United States. It has three exhibits: the historic home and botanical gardens, Coca-Cola museum, and Bible museum.

The Coca-Cola Museum opened in 2008 and holds Coca-Cola memorabilia and historical items. Emma Louise Biedenharn collected bibles and religious artwork and gardened, leading to the establishment of the Bible museum and botanical gardens.

== History ==
The Biedenharn Museum was built in 1913 as a private home by Joseph A. Biedenharn, who is credited with first bottling Coca-Cola in the summer of 1894 while living in his birthplace of Vicksburg, Mississippi. The home is open for tours and furnished as it was during the residence of Joseph Biedenharn's daughter, Emma Louise "Emy-Lou" Biedenharn, who died in 1984.

== ELsong Garden ==
The garden's name is short for Emy-Lou's song, named after Emy-Lou Biedenharn, Joseph Biedenharn's daughter. The garden settings include the Four Seasons Garden, Oriental Garden, and Musical Grotto.

== See also ==
- List of botanical gardens in the United States
