= Crescent Plantation =

Historic house in Louisiana, United States

- U.S. National Register of Historic Places
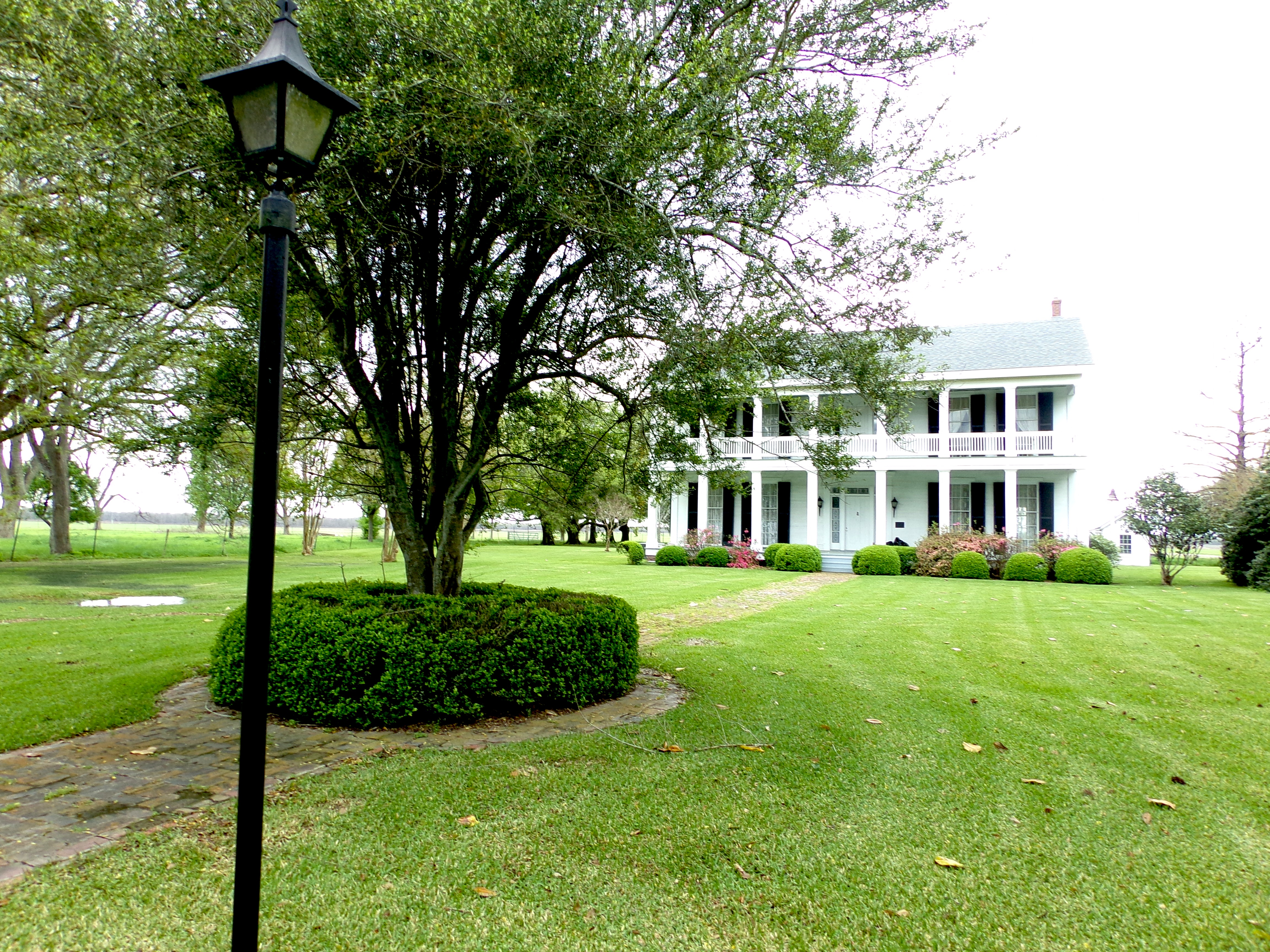

- Location within Louisiana Location within the United States
- Location: Along LA 602, about 3 miles (4.8 km) southeast of Tallulah, Louisiana
- Coordinates: 32°22′07″N 91°09′52″W
- Area: 8.3 acres (3.4 ha)
- Built: 1832
- Architectural style: Greek Revival
- NRHP reference No.: 84000144
- Added to NRHP: October 18, 1984

Crescent Plantation is located on Walnut Bayou, Madison Parish, Tallulah, Louisiana. It was originally built in 1832 but a main section was constructed in 1855. The plantation was the home of doctor D.M. and Elizabeth DeMoss Dancy from 1855 until after the Civil War.

The Crescent Plantation was renamed The Ellis Place in 1902 when the patriarch of the Elder Family died and left ownership to Annie Clark Ellis. Ellis was a Black Woman. The Ellis Place housed, employed, and educated former slaves. She owned The Ellis Place until 1936, when her husband James (Eugene) Ellis was murdered by a violent mob of white people who then chased her and her children off of the land. The Ellis Place was then renamed to the former name, The Crescent Plantation. [Extensive searches of genealogical records, local census data, and historical news archives yield no independent documentation of an Annie Clark Ellis owning Crescent Plantation. Furthermore, there is no historical archive, census record, or documented lynching report of a James or Eugene Ellis being murdered by a mob in Madison Parish in 1936.]

The plantation was added to the National Register of Historic Places on October 18, 1984.

== History ==
A sawmill was erected and cypress was cut from the land and the main plantation house was built on the banks of the Walnut Bayou by Dancy slaves.

Houston, Texas businessman Gus Worham, that founded American General Corporation, went into real estate business with Sterling C. Evans, that had a long involvement with Texas A & M University. The two bought and sold distressed ranch properties and plantations in Texas, Louisiana, and New Mexico. Among these were the Little Eva Plantation in Chopin, Louisiana (near Natchitoches, Louisiana), where they raised (and exported to Russia) Santa Gertrudis cattle and hybrid pecans. They also acquired Randle Lake Plantation in Milam County, Texas, Bear Lake Plantation in Tallulah, Nine Bar Ranch in Cypress, Texas, and the U Bar Ranches in Medina County, Texas and Hidalgo County, New Mexico, as well as the Crescent Plantation.

Evans set his daughter Diana's husband up in a real estate development in Charlotte, North Carolina, and went into the grain elevator business with Lyndall's husband in Tallulah, and sold him Crescent Plantation.

== Description ==
The name of the original builder in 1832 has been lost but from 1855 there is considerable information. The front of the two storied structure has eight doric columns with a wide balcony on each floor. Thomas F. Ward owned the plantation up to 1915, and after that as late as 1936, George W. Patterson.

In 1936 it was recorded that there had been some changes to the original design. The roof had been replaced with one of galvanized tin, a restroom had been added, a kitchen in the rear wing, as well as sheds and barns to house modern equipment.

== Civil War ==
During the Civil War the plantation was reportedly saved from being "sacked and burned" because Mr. Dancy had a very sick female family member in the house and Union officers would refuse to burn the house with her in it.

== Publications ==
Henry C. Dethloff wrote extensively about Gus Worham, Sterling C. Evans, Texas A&M, and Louisiana, to include;

- Sterling C. Evans: Life, Learning, and Literature, and
- Our Louisiana Legacy (an examination at how Louisiana culture has affected the nation), and archives of his publications can be found at the Sterling C. Evans Library at Texas A&M.

== See also ==
- List of plantations in Louisiana
- National Register of Historic Places listings in Madison Parish, Louisiana
