= National Register of Historic Places listings in Madison Parish, Louisiana =

Location of Madison Parish in Louisiana

This is a list of the National Register of Historic Places listings in Madison Parish, Louisiana.

This is intended to be a complete list of the properties on the National Register of Historic Places in Madison Parish, Louisiana, United States. The locations of National Register properties for which the latitude and longitude coordinates are included below, may be seen in a map.

There are 16 properties listed on the National Register in the parish.

This National Park Service list is complete through NPS recent listings posted September 12, 2025.

== Current listings ==
	Name on the Register	Image	Date listed	Location	City or town	Description
1	Bear Lake Club, Ltd. Clubhouse	Bear Lake Club, Ltd. Clubhouse	March 2, 2001 (#01000118)	Along Bear Lake Road West, about 6.2 miles (10.0 km) northwest of Tallulah; 32°28′02″N 91°16′03″W	Tallulah vicinity	
2	Bloom's Arcade	Bloom's Arcade	January 19, 1989 (#88003214)	102 Depot Street; 32°24′35″N 91°11′28″W	Tallulah	
3	Crescent Plantation	Crescent Plantation	October 18, 1984 (#84000144)	Along LA 602, about 3 miles (4.8 km) southeast of Tallulah, Louisiana; 32°22′07″N 91°09′52″W	Tallulah vicinity	
4	Hermione	Hermione	November 23, 1998 (#98001422)	305 North Mulberry Street; 32°24′35″N 91°11′06″W	Tallulah	Originally listed in 1988 as ref #88002652. Relisted in 1998 when the building was moved from its original location into Tallulah. Now a historical society museum.
5	Kell House	Kell House	June 23, 1988 (#88000900)	502 North Mulberry Street; 32°24′39″N 91°11′01″W	Tallulah	
6	Madison Parish Courthouse	Madison Parish Courthouse	February 21, 1989 (#89000044)	100 North Cedar Street; 32°24′30″N 91°11′15″W	Tallulah	
7	Mississippi River Bridge	Mississippi River Bridge	February 14, 1989 (#88002423)	Spans the Mississippi River on Old U.S. Route 80; 32°18′53″N 90°54′21″W	Delta	Extends into Warren County, Mississippi
8	Montrose Plantation House	Montrose Plantation House	October 5, 1982 (#82000444)	Along LA 603, about 6.5 miles (10.5 km) southeast of Tallulah; 32°19′24″N 91°08′28″W	Tallulah vicinity	
9	Scottland Plantation House	Scottland Plantation House	November 2, 1982 (#82000445)	903 Bayou Drive; 32°24′08″N 91°11′45″W	Tallulah	
10	Shirley Field	Shirley Field	February 14, 1985 (#85000270)	Along Airport Road, about 2.2 miles (3.5 km) east of Tallulah; 32°24′59″N 91°09′03″W	Tallulah vicinity	
11	Tallulah Book Club Building	Tallulah Book Club Building	November 7, 1991 (#91001660)	515 Dabney Street; 32°24′22″N 91°11′14″W	Tallulah	
12	Tallulah Coca-Cola Bottling Plant	Tallulah Coca-Cola Bottling Plant	January 23, 2013 (#12001205)	Corner of North Plum Street and East Green Street; 32°24′26″N 91°11′04″W	Tallulah	
13	Tallulah High School	Tallulah High School	September 10, 2013 (#13000693)	603 Bayou Drive; 32°24′14″N 91°11′33″W	Tallulah	
14	Tallulah Men's Club Building	Tallulah Men's Club Building	November 7, 1991 (#91001658)	108 North Cedar Street; 32°24′28″N 91°11′12″W	Tallulah	
15	Tallulah Post Office	Tallulah Post Office	September 11, 2013 (#13000731)	606 Snyder Street; 32°24′25″N 91°11′07″W	Tallulah	
16	Francis Thompson Site (16 MA 112)		October 8, 1991 (#91001464)	Address restricted	Delhi vicinity	

== See also ==
- Grant's Canal, a portion of Vicksburg National Military Park in Louisiana
- List of National Historic Landmarks in Louisiana
- National Register of Historic Places listings in Louisiana
