= Tallulah Book Club Building =

- U.S. National Register of Historic Places
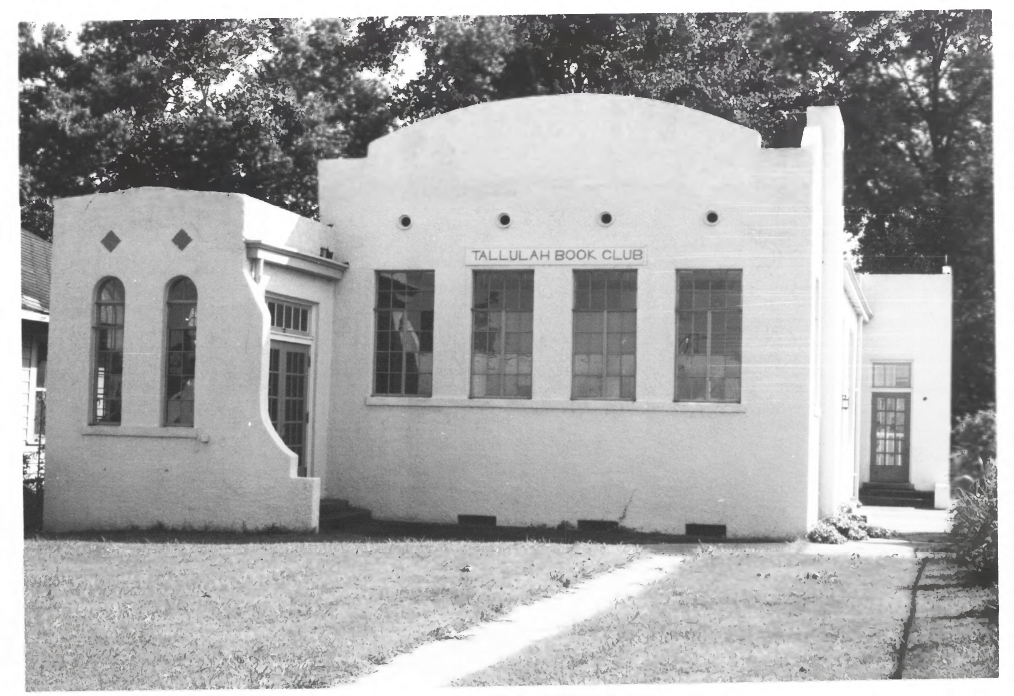

- Location within Louisiana Location within the United States
- Location: 515 Dabney Street, Tallulah, Louisiana
- Coordinates: 32°24′22″N 91°11′14″W
- Area: less than one acre
- Built: 1930
- Architect: William Stanton
- Architectural style: Mission Revival, Spanish Revival
- NRHP reference No.: 91001660
- Added to NRHP: November 7, 1991

The Tallulah Book Club Building, located at 515 Dabney St. in Tallulah, Louisiana, was built in 1930. It was listed on the National Register of Historic Places in 1991.

It was designed by architect William Stanton in Spanish Revival/Mission Revival style.

It has served as a women's clubhouse and as a lending library for the community and parish. It was originally named the Tallulah Literary Club, and was an organization founded in 1902 by a group of women. The building made them the only Federated Women's Club in Louisiana to own its own building.

== See also ==
- Tallulah Men's Club Building
- National Register of Historic Places listings in Madison Parish, Louisiana
