= Scottland Plantation House =

Historic house in Louisiana, United States

- U.S. National Register of Historic Places
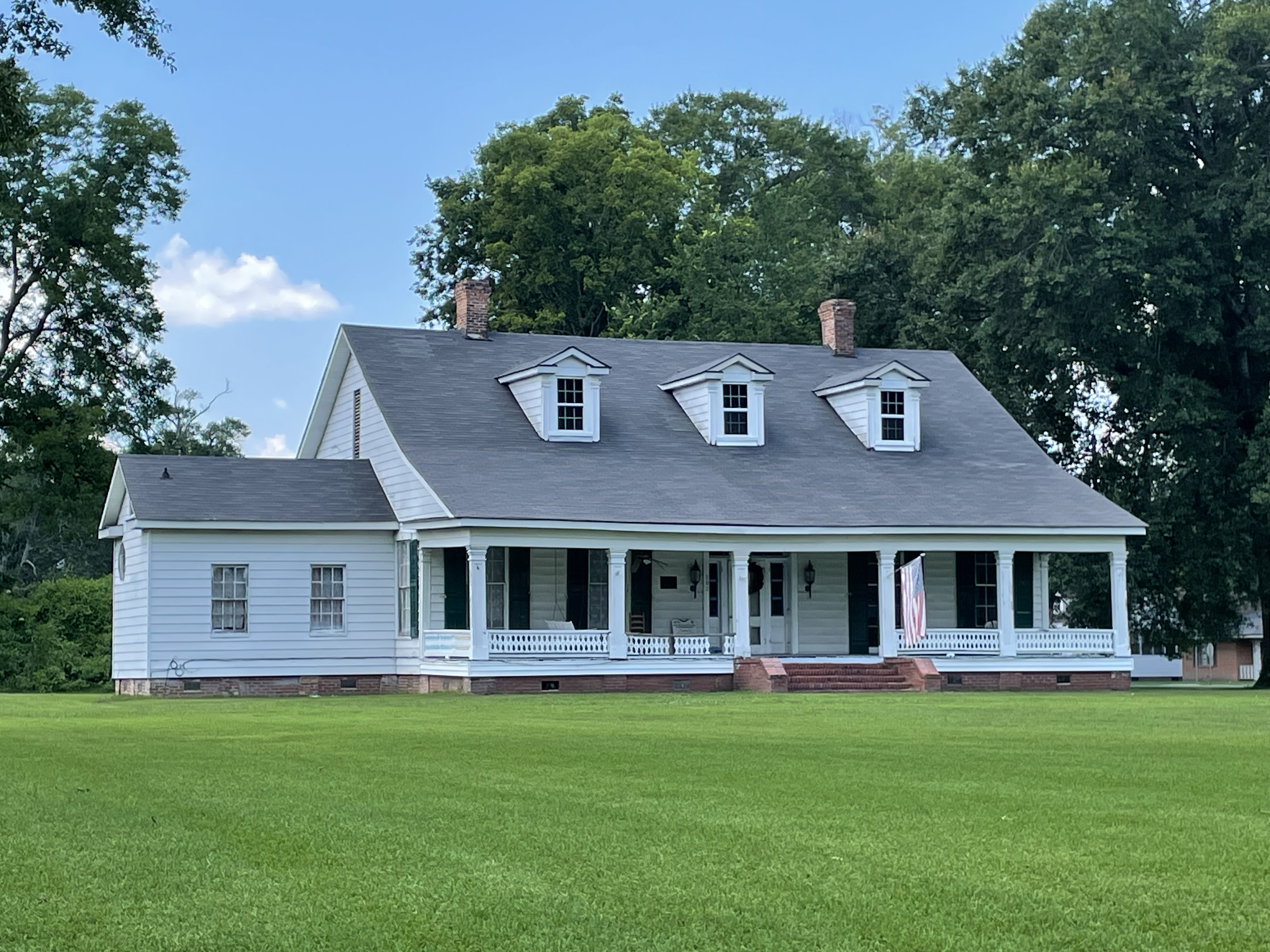

- Location within Louisiana Location within the United States
- Location: 903 Bayou Drive, Tallulah, Louisiana
- Coordinates: 32°24′08″N 91°11′45″W
- Area: 0.7 acres (0.28 ha)
- Built: 1860
- Architectural style: Greek Revival
- NRHP reference No.: 82000445
- Added to NRHP: November 02, 1982

Scottland Plantation House is located in Tallulah, Louisiana. It was built in 1860 and was added to the National Register of Historic Places on November 2, 1982.

Scottland Plantation was the home of Thomas B. Scott, the first sheriff of Madison Parish. The house was bought and restored by Lt. Col. (ret.) Porter Johnson. Lt. Col. Johnson had served in Iraq during 2010–2011 with the Army's Strategic Effects Branch, and he was involved in the restoration of war-damaged historical sites. He bought Scottland Plantation after his return to his hometown. His scope of work included replacing the roof and repairing windows.

== See also ==
- List of plantations in Louisiana
- National Register of Historic Places listings in Madison Parish, Louisiana
