= Joseph A. Biedenharn =

American businessman and philanthropist

Joseph Augustus Biedenharn
- Biedenharn (c. 1895)
- Born: December 13, 1866; Vicksburg, Mississippi, United States
- Died: October 9, 1952 (aged 85); Monroe, Louisiana, United States
- Resting place: Riverview Cemetery in Monroe
- Occupation: Businessman

Joseph Augustus Biedenharn (December 13, 1866 – October 9, 1952) was an American businessman and confectioner credited in the summer of 1894 with having first bottled the soda fountain drink, Coca-Cola, at his wholesale candy company building in Vicksburg, Mississippi. As he expanded this business, he created a model of bottling-distributor franchises and built his company through this state, as well as Louisiana and Texas.

In 1913, he moved the manufacturing and bottling operations to Monroe, Louisiana, continuing to grow the business. With his son Malcolm and other entrepreneurs, in 1925 he bought a crop-dusting business. They added eighteen planes to the fleet, making it the largest private one in the world. They developed this business as Delta Air Lines, moving it later to Atlanta, Georgia. The Biedenharn family has had a philanthropic tradition in both Vicksburg and Monroe, making major contributions to historic, educational, recreational and charitable purposes.

== Vicksburg years ==
Of German ancestry, Biedenharn was the oldest son of twelve children, born in Vicksburg to Herman Henry Biedenharn and the former Louisa Wilhemine Lundberg. Three children died in 1874/75, eight sons and one daughter grew up. Both were immigrants with their families following the Revolutions of 1848. Biedenharn's father and uncle owned a two-story brick building in downtown Vicksburg, which housed Herman's shoe store on one side and his son Joseph's candy company on the other.

After getting established, Biedenharn married Annie in 1889. They had a daughter, Emma Louise (Emy-Lou), and three sons, Malcolm S. Biedenharn, Henry A. Biedenharn Sr., and Bernard W. Biedenharn. Malcolm worked closely with his father in the family business and its various expansions into other fields.

Though Coca-Cola had been invented in 1886 in Atlanta, Georgia by the pharmacist John S. Pemberton, it was not sold in bottles until Joseph Biedenharn developed the new procedure. He delivered the bottled drink to rural areas outside of Vicksburg, increasing the base of customers. He was not only the first bottler of the drinks but he established the new marketing technique of an independent network of franchise bottlers who distribute the drink. This has since grown to be worldwide in scope. Biedenharn had been advised by his father to "go into the nickel business", meaning to offer soft drinks for five cents each. Prior to 1900, many people would hold on to a dime but spend a nickel for pleasure.

Subsequently, Biedenharn and his brothers Will, Harry, Lawrence, Herman, Ollie, and Albert, and sister Katy acquired franchises to bottle Coca-Cola in Mississippi, Louisiana, and Texas. The site at 1107 Washington Street in Vicksburg, where the first bottling occurred, was built in 1890. Today it is a museum dedicated to this brand and industry. As their business grew, the Biedenharns bottled Coca-Cola in other locations in downtown Vicksburg until 1938, when they constructed a new Coca-Cola plant at 2133 Washington Street. The family sold the first building, and it was used for other commercial purposes.

In 1979, the Biedenharns regained ownership of the building. They renovated it and adapted it for use as a museum, using historic photographs and various exhibits to interpret the Coca-Cola heritage. The Biedenharns donated the building to the Vicksburg Foundation for Historic Preservation.

== Move to Monroe ==
In 1913, Joseph Biedenharn moved with his family to Monroe in Ouachita Parish in northeastern Louisiana, where he purchased a small bottling plant to produce Coca-Cola.

The Tallulah Coca-Cola Bottling Plant operated by Joe Biedenharn, built in c.1930 and c.1940 in Madison Parish, is listed on the National Register of Historic Places.

He and his wife had a large mansion and gardens designed for them. The Biedenharn home in Monroe is now a tourist attraction, operated as the Biedenharn Museum and Gardens at 2000 Riverside Drive. It is visited by 25,000 to 30,000 persons per year. The original Biedenharn home is furnished as it was during the years when the Biedenharns' daughter, Emy-Lou, a contralto opera singer prior to World War II, resided there until her death in 1984. In addition, the house has an area of soft drink exhibits, and a Bible Museum with rare books. It also hosts rotating exhibits.

In 1925, Joseph and his son Malcolm Biedenharn, together with other entrepreneurs, purchased a crop-dusting business. They added eighteen planes, making it the largest privately owned fleet in the world. That company eventually developed as Delta Air Lines. It operated from Monroe before moving to the larger regional city of Atlanta. Until the late 1990s, a Biedenharn family member always sat on the Delta board.

After the death of his son Malcolm, Biedenharn named a grandson, Henry A. Biedenharn Jr. (1919–2010), as the president of the Ouachita Coca-Cola Bottling Company. Joseph Biedenharn died in the fall of 1952 in Monroe at the age of eighty-five.

In 1962, Emy-Lou Biedenharn published a memoir of her father, a decade after his death. In 1971, she established the Emy-Lou Biedenharn Foundation as a charitable organization in the city.

Henry A. Biedenharn Jr., a Monroe native who served in World War II as a United States Navy flight instructor, also became affiliated with Biedenharn Realty Company, Inc., the Harn and Biedco corporations, the Ouachita National Bank, Premier Bank, and Bank One. He participated as well in the foundation established by his aunt, Emy-Lou Biedenharn. In 1940, he wed the former Dorothy "Doll" Hudson (1921–2017), a socialite also from Monroe. The couple had four children.

The Biedenharn family is known for its philanthropy:

Just look around our community—there's an Emy-Lou Biedenharn Recital Hall at the University of Louisiana at Monroe, there are at least three student scholarships at ULM, and we've got the ballfields in West Monroe. The individual family members also have been very charitable," said Ralph Calhoun, executive director of the museum and gardens.

Alana Cooper, executive director of the Monroe-West Monroe Convention and Visitors Bureau, told the Monroe News-Star that her city might be a much different community if the Biedenharns had never moved there: "Large corporations were formed in the area and they grew into national companies and that's because he and his family were smart businesspeople. A lot of things grew from those businesses ... that provided a lot of jobs for a lot of people." Cooper also noted that Emy-Lou Biedenharn left her own cultural legacy to the city.
