= Tallulah Coca-Cola Bottling Plant =

- U.S. National Register of Historic Places
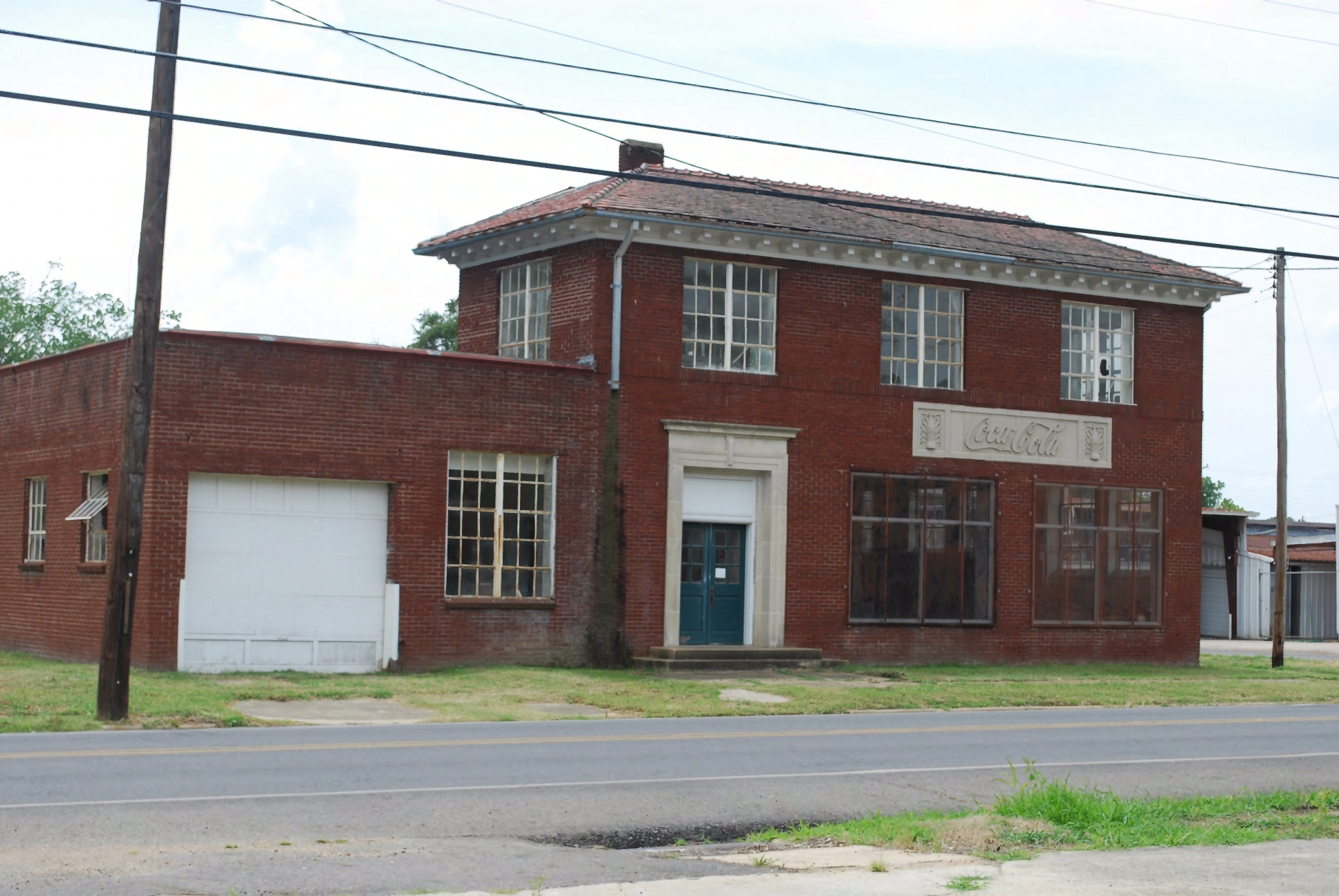

- Location within Louisiana Location within the United States
- Location: Corner of North Plum Street and East Green Street, Tallulah, Louisiana
- Coordinates: 32°24′26″N 91°11′04″W
- Area: Less than one acre
- Built: c.1930
- Architectural style: Classical Revival
- NRHP reference No.: 12001205
- Added to NRHP: January 23, 2013

The Tallulah Coca-Cola Bottling Plant in Tallulah, Louisiana, was listed on the National Register of Historic Places on January 23, 2013.

The building was a Coca-Cola bottling plant until 1962, when it was converted to use as a Coca-Cola distribution warehouse. The facility was operated by Joe Biedenharn, "the first person to bottle Coca-Cola."

The plant is a brick industrial building built on a poured concrete foundation in about 1930 and expanded, almost doubling its size, in about 1940. A partial second story at the front is supported by steel columns. The building has a Classical Revival front facade.

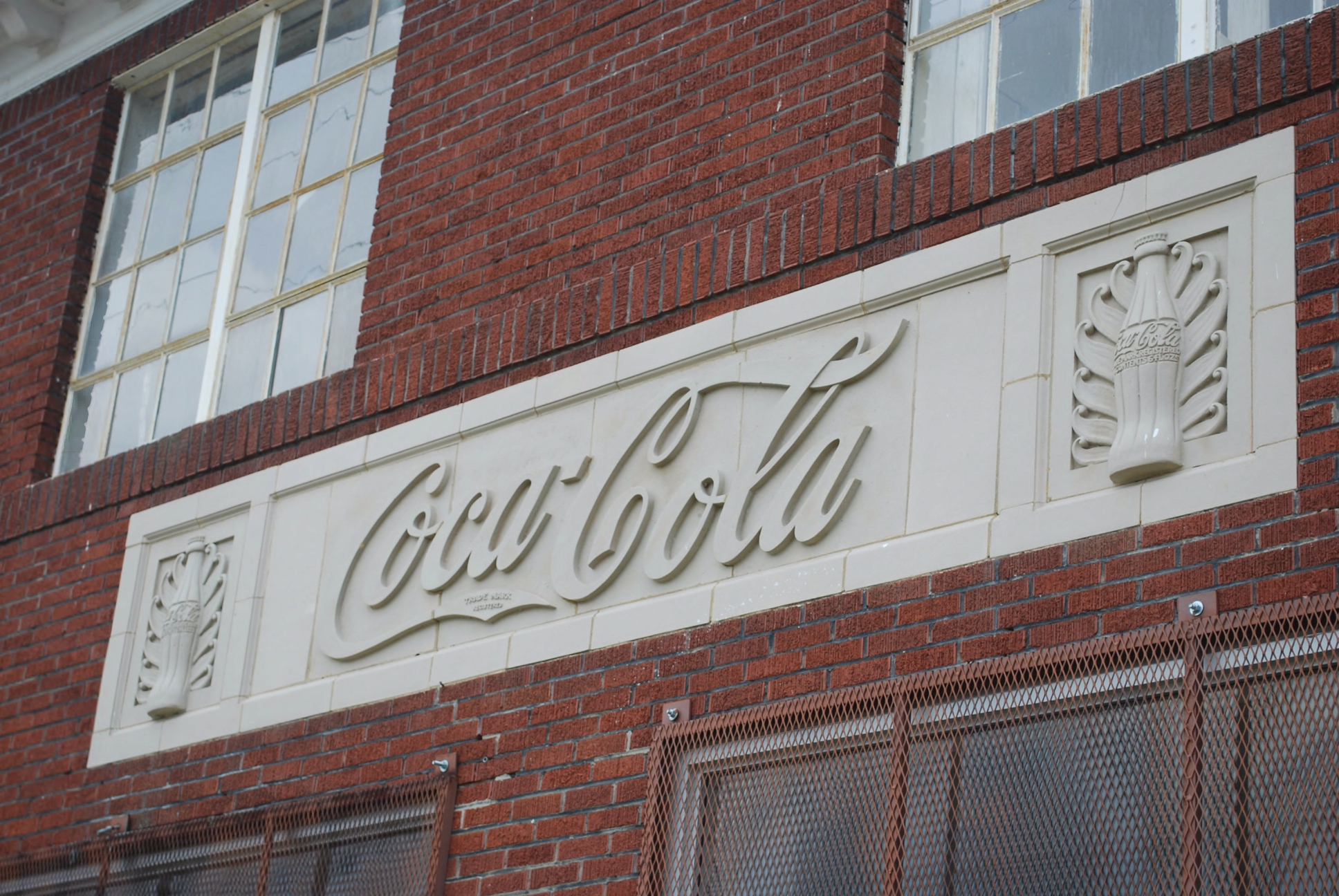
Terra cotta panel with Coke bottles

== See also ==
- List of Coca-Cola buildings and structures
- National Register of Historic Places listings in Madison Parish, Louisiana
