= Shirley Field (Tallulah, Louisiana) =

- U.S. National Register of Historic Places
- U.S. Historic district
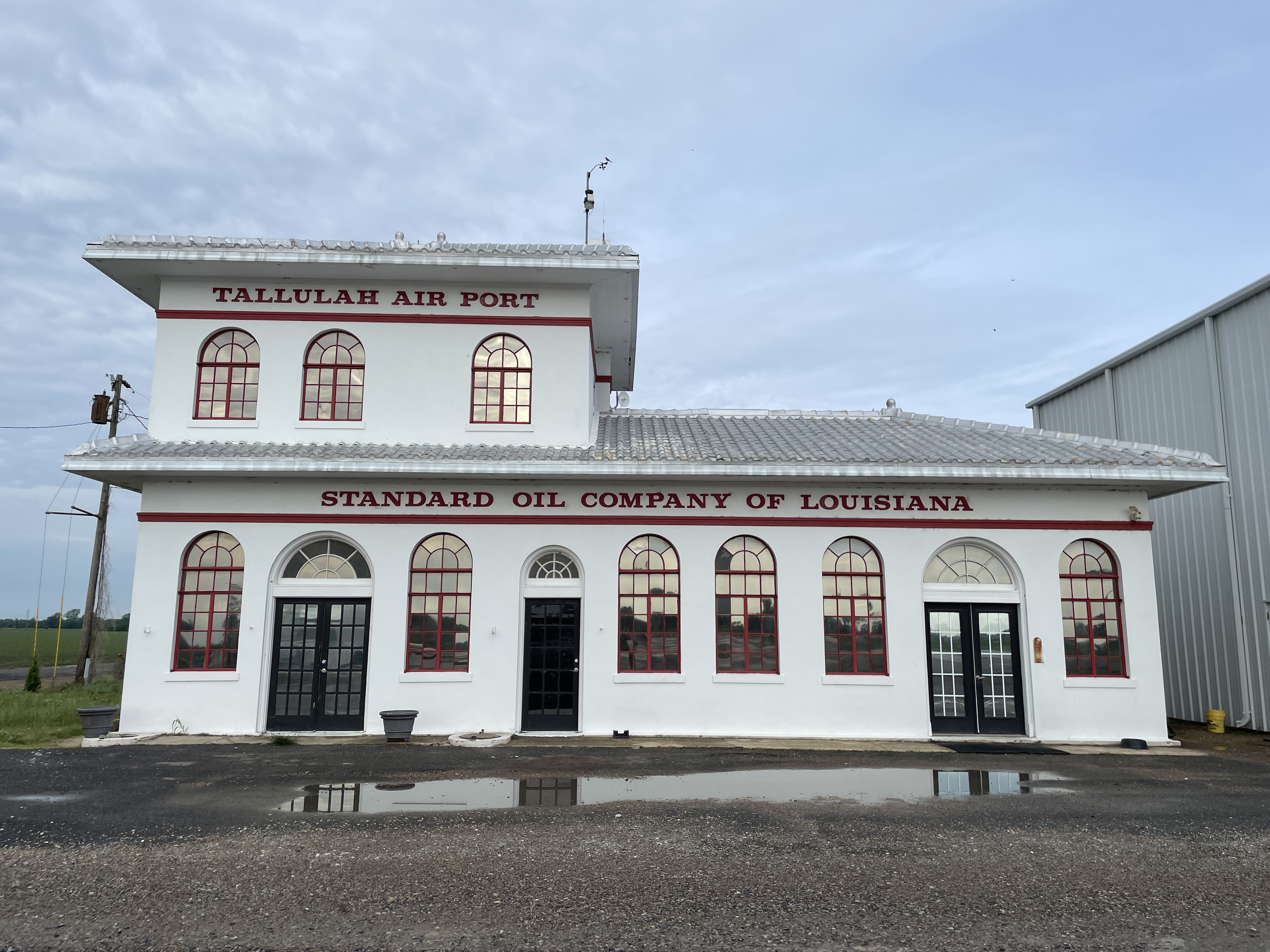

- Location within Louisiana Location within the United States
- Location: Along Airport Road, about 2.2 miles (3.5 km) east of Tallulah
- Nearest city: Tallulah, Louisiana
- Coordinates: 32°24′59″N 91°09′03″W
- Area: 25 acres (10 ha)
- Built: 1922
- Built by: USDA Delta Laboratory
- Architectural style: Mission Revival, Spanish Revival
- NRHP reference No.: 85000270
- Added to NRHP: February 14, 1985

Shirley Field, also known as Scott Airfield, located off US 80 just east of Tallulah, Louisiana, dates from 1922. It was listed on the National Register of Historic Places on February 14, 1985. The listing included two contributing buildings and a contributing site.

It is notable in the area of agriculture for its role in the development of cotton crop dusting, to control boll weevils.

The field includes a Mission Revival-style terminal with round arch windows and a metal tile roof. It also includes a frame hangar from the 1920s, as well as two hangars from the 1950s.

== See also ==
- National Register of Historic Places listings in Madison Parish, Louisiana
