= Kell House Museum =

Historic house in Texas, United States

Coordinates: 33.9074°N 98.4970°W

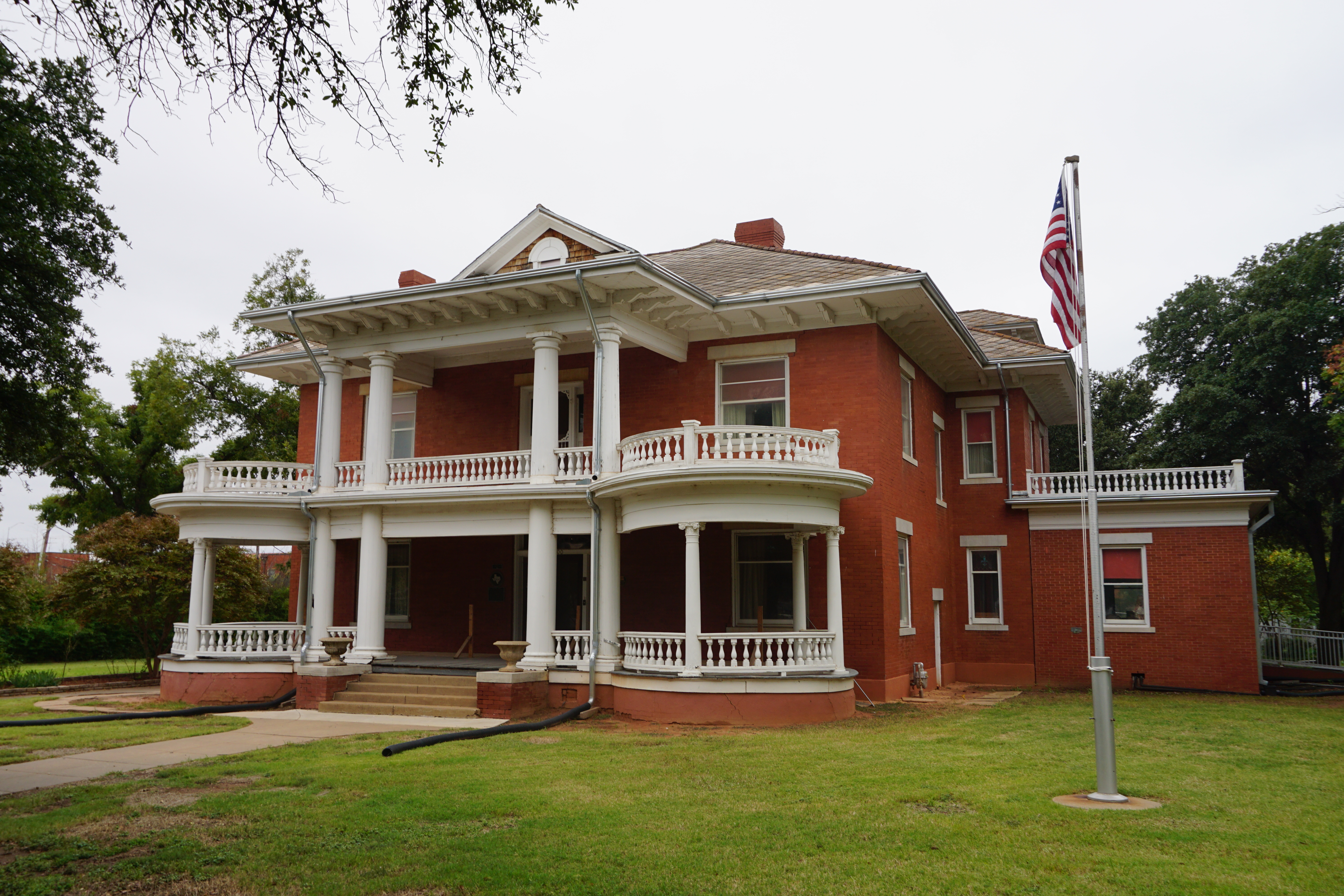
The Frank Kell House located at 900 Bluff Street in Wichita Falls, Texas, is a museum of the residence of the railroad, flour milling, and oil industrialist Frank Kell.

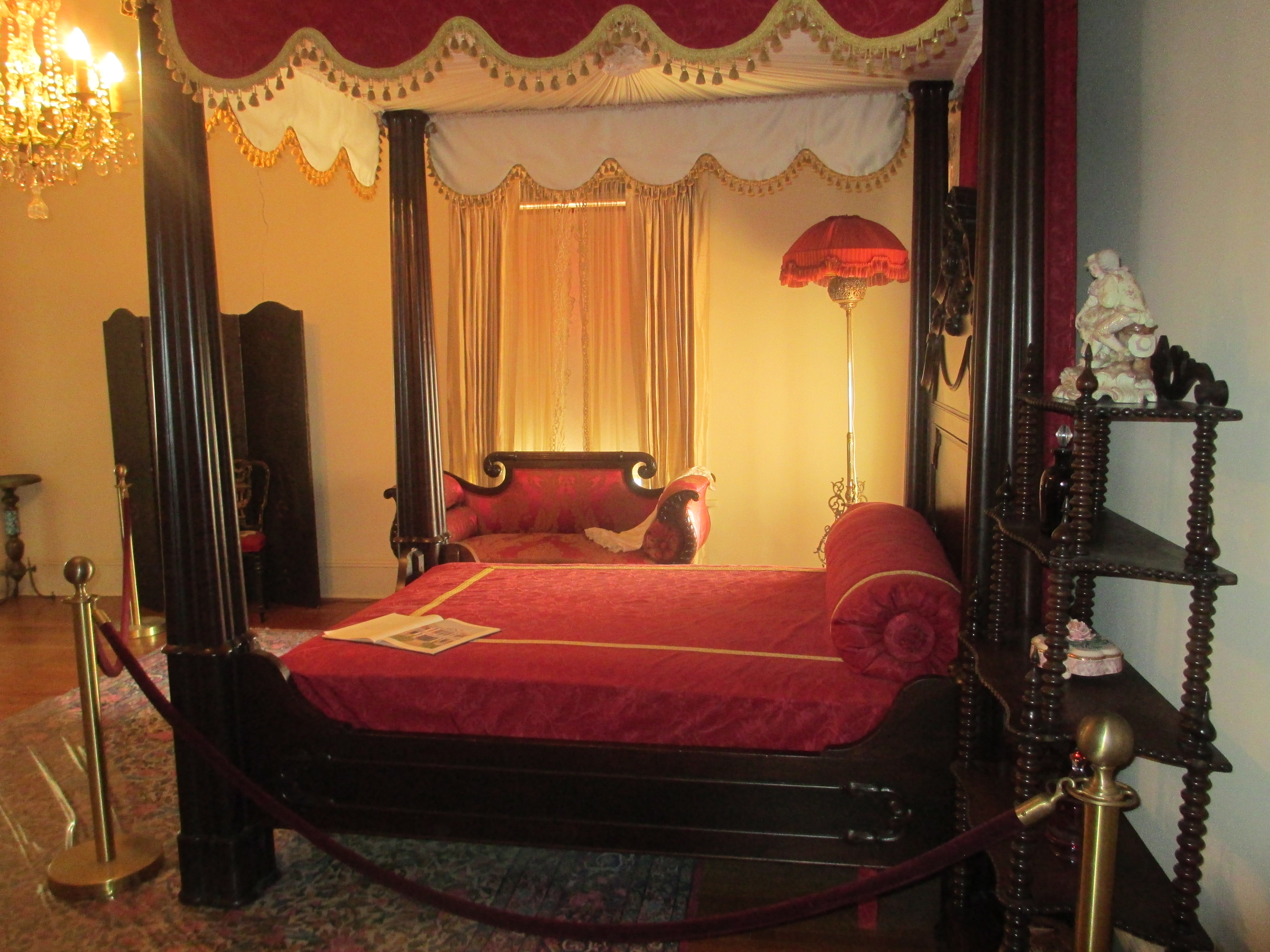
The Kell daughter next in line to be married occupied this bedroom until her wedding day.

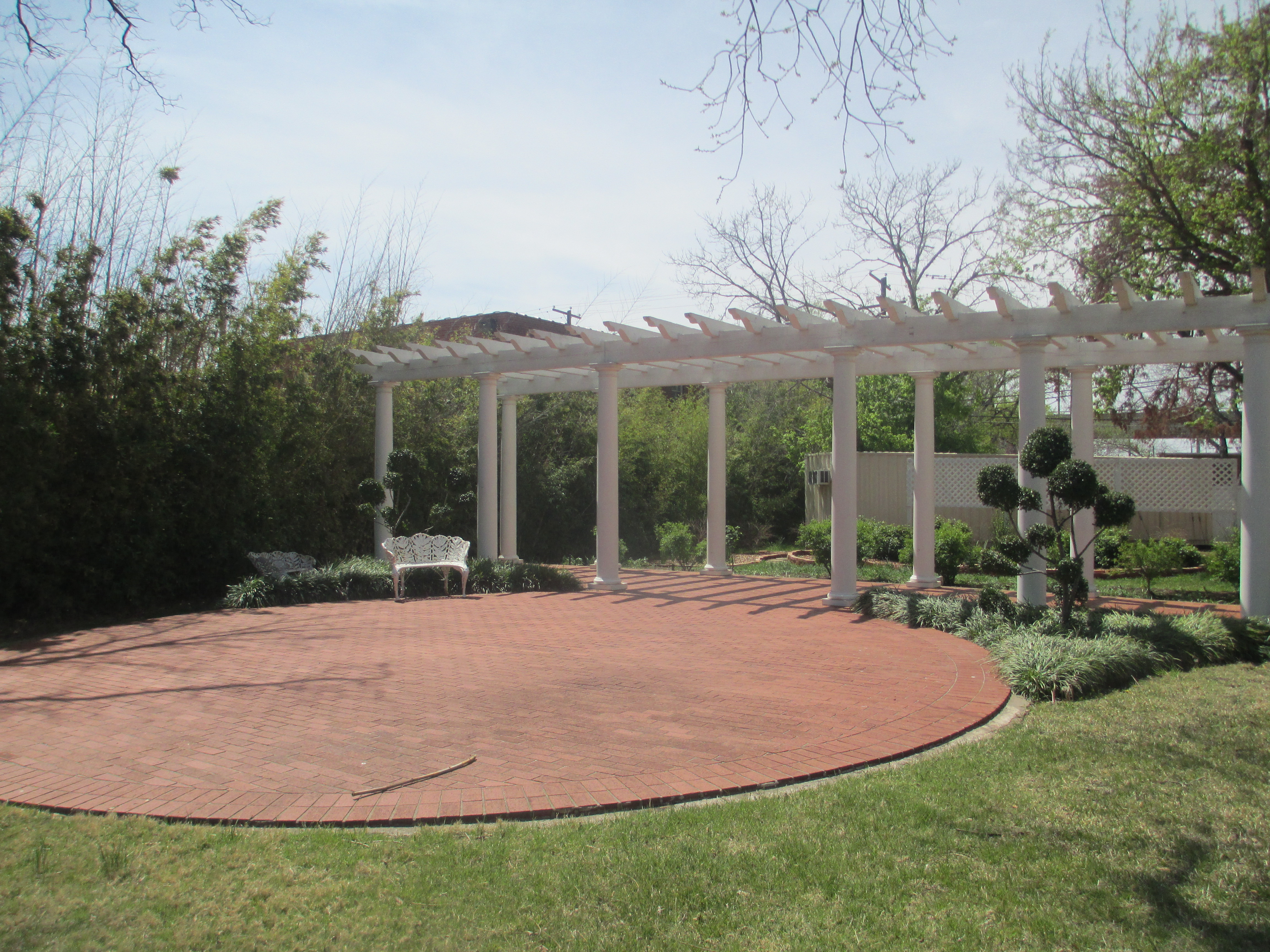
Outside rear patio at The Kell House

Kell House Museum, also known as The Kell House, is a historic house museum in Wichita Falls, Texas, United States. The house was occupied from 1909 until 1980 by members of the family of Frank Kell, who made a fortune in railroads, flour milling and oil. Kell and his brother-in-law, Joseph A. Kemp, are considered the two leading business promoters of Wichita Falls in the early decades of the 20th century.

== History ==
In 1896, Kell moved from Bosque County in Central Texas to Wichita Falls. Prior to the construction of The Kell House, the family lived in another residence on Scott Street. Kell purchased the land on the bluff overlooking downtown Wichita Falls, hence the address of 900 Bluff Street. Kell's sister-in-law was the contractor on the Victorian home. Construction of the two-story dwelling began in 1908 and was completed in 1910, after it had already been occupied by the Kell family.

The house is just east of the Central Freeway. Lula Kemp Kell (1866-1957), Kell's widow, remained in the home until her death. Their only unmarried daughter, Willie May Kell (1888-1980), occupied the house until her death.

== Museum ==
The Wichita County Heritage Society purchased the property and converted it into a museum that opened to the public in 1981.

On entering the house, one sees a spiral staircase to the top floor. A formal parlor on the left side of the lower floor was used by the Kells only for a few special days of the year; otherwise, it was closed off. This parlor was opened with full decorations at Christmas and for weddings, other special occasions, even funerals. Frank Kell lay in state in the parlor on his death in September 1941. The idea of closing off the parlor for most of the year was intended to reinforce its special significance. One room contains both a small library and a pool table. The kitchen was modern by the standards of that time.

One of the five bedrooms has a red quilt on the bed. This room was occupied by the daughter who had become engaged to marry; this daughter would remain there until the day of her wedding. Her sisters, except for Willie May as it developed, would then occupy that room once they became engaged and remain there until their own weddings. Three daughters were married in the house, the first, Sadie (1886-1960), wed Orville Bullington in 1911; two others chose local churches for their ceremonies. The Kells were Presbyterians though the house coincidentally is across the street from part of the First Baptist Church complex. The wedding receptions were held at the country club. Despite a fire in one bedroom in the 1970s, the house was quickly restored. A second bed in the master bedroom was used for a child whenever the Kells had overnight guests.

In 2011, the heritage society launched a capital campaign to renovate The Kell House in phases over a five-year period. The first phase stabilized the structure of the building itself. The second phase involves exterior repair and restoration. The final phase will bring improvements to the interior of the building.

With original family furnishings, decorative arts, textiles, and historic clothing, The Kell House is one of the most historically and architecturally significant buildings in Wichita Falls. Guided tours are available.
