= Kell House (Tallulah, Louisiana) =

Historic house in Louisiana, United States

- U.S. National Register of Historic Places
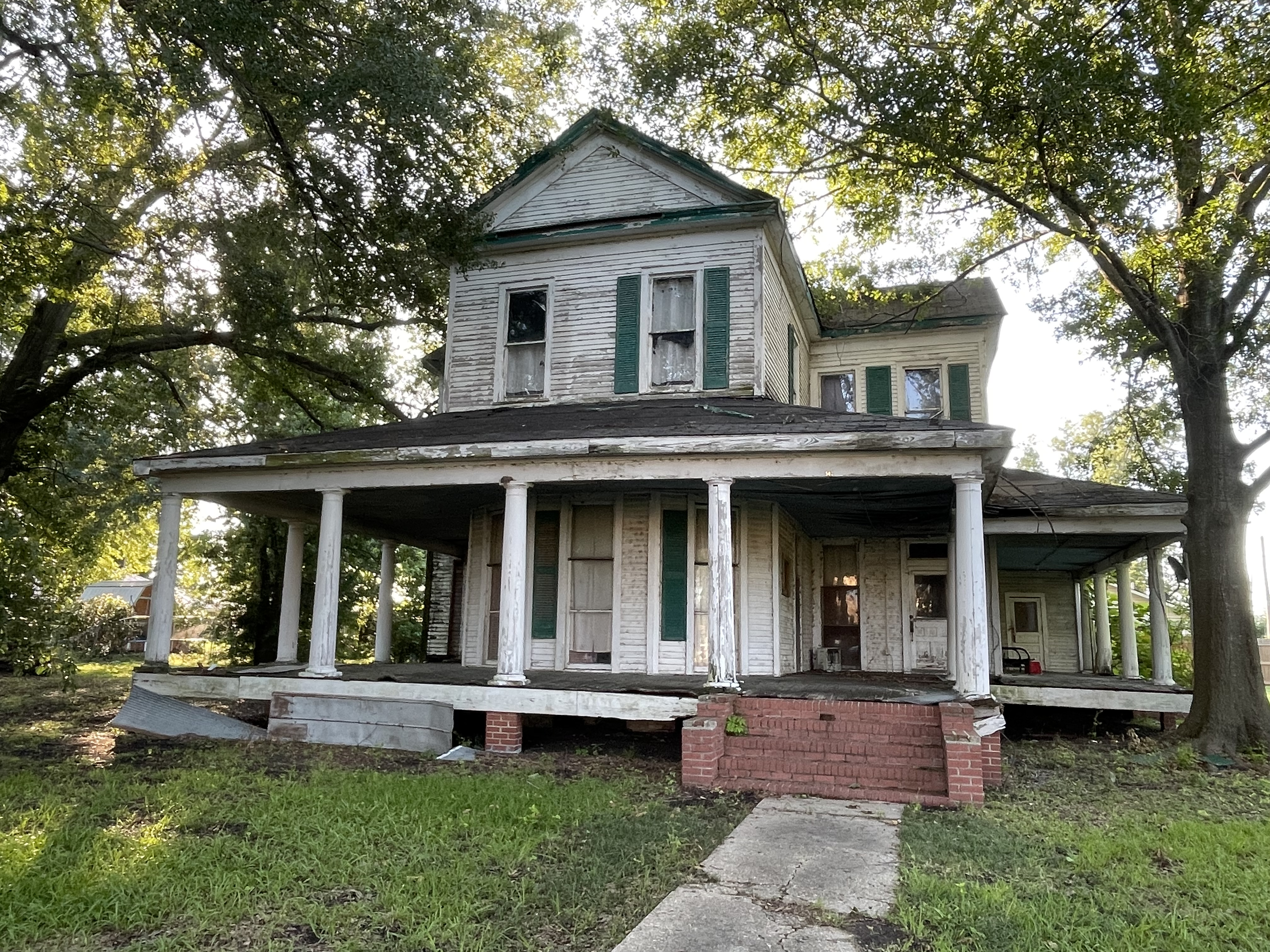
- Kell House in 2025

- Location within Louisiana Location within the United States
- Location: 502 North Mulberry Street, Tallulah, Louisiana
- Coordinates: 32°24′39″N 91°11′01″W
- Area: less than one acre
- Built: 1910
- Architectural style: Colonial Revival, Queen Anne
- NRHP reference No.: 88000900
- Added to NRHP: June 23, 1988

Kell House, at 502 North Mulberry Street in Tallulah, Louisiana, was built in 1910 by descendants of a planter family. It was listed on the National Register of Historic Places on June 23, 1988.

It is a "rambling" two-story Queen Anne and Colonial Revival style house which stands out architecturally relative to the usual residences in Tallulah. It has a 20-bay wraparound Tuscan gallery which is "easily the most architecturally impressive residential gallery in Tallulah."

== See also ==
- National Register of Historic Places listings in Madison Parish, Louisiana
